= SS Vestris =

1912 ocean liner

Coordinates: 37°38′N 70°23′W

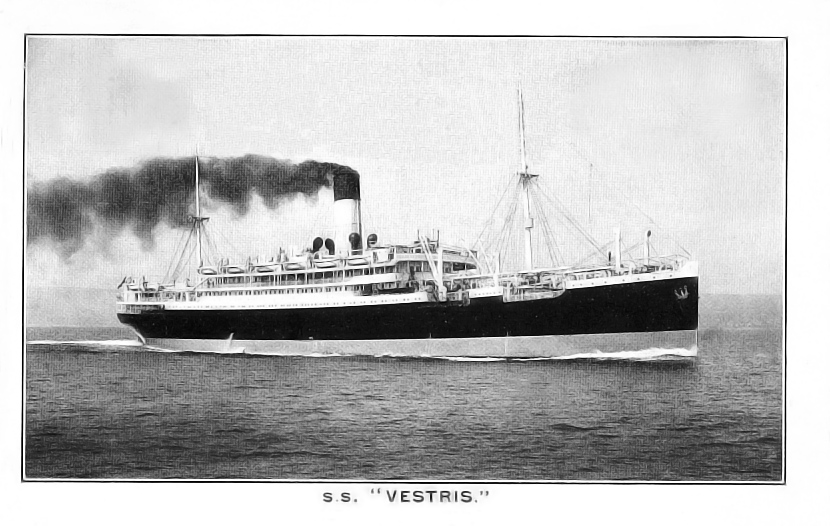
- Postcard of Vestris

History

United Kingdom
- Name: Vestris
- Namesake: Vestris family
- Owner: Liverpool, Brazil and River Plate Steam Navigation Co
- Operator: Lamport and Holt
- Builder: Workman, Clark & Co, Belfast
- Yard number: 303
- Launched: 16 May 1912
- Maiden voyage: 19 September 1912 from Liverpool to the River Plate. 26 October 1912 First sailing to New York
- Identification: Official number 131451
- Fate: Sank 12 November 1928
- Notes: Final voyage from Hoboken, New Jersey sailing from New York to Barbados and South American ports 10 November 1928 – 12 November 1928

General characteristics
- Type: Ocean liner
- Tonnage: 10,494 GRT; 6,622 NRT
- Length: 496 feet (151 m) between posts, 511 feet (156 m) overall
- Beam: 60 feet 6 inches (18.44 m)
- Draught: Salt water draught in 1912 by Lloyds, 26 feet 9¼ inches for summer, and 26 feet 3¼ inches for winter. Salt water draught on her final voyage was found to have been 26 feet 11½ inches
- Installed power: 614 NHP, producing 8,000 IHP
- Propulsion: 2 × 4-cylinder quadruple-expansion engines, twin screws
- Speed: 15 knots (28 km/h)
- Capacity: Passengers: 280 First Class, 130 Second Class, 200 Third Class. 5 cargo holds.
- Crew: 250
- Notes: sister ships: Vandyck, Vauban

SS Vestris was a 1912 steam ocean liner operated by Lamport and Holt Line and used on its service between New York and the River Plate. On 12 November 1928 she began listing in heavy seas about 200 miles (300 km) off Hampton Roads, Virginia, was abandoned, and sank, killing more than 100 people. Her wreck is thought to lie some 1.2 miles (2 km) beneath the North Atlantic.

The sinking attracted much press coverage at the time and remains notable for the loss of life, particularly of women and children when the ship was being abandoned. The sinking and subsequent inquiries may also have shaped the second International Convention for the Safety of Life at Sea (SOLAS) in 1929.

== Building ==
In 1911–13 Workman, Clark & Company of Belfast, Ireland built three sister ships for Lamport and Holt. Vandyck was launched in 1911, Vauban in January 1912 and Vestris in May 1912. The trio were similar in size to Vasari that Sir Raylton Dixon & Co built for Lamport and Holt in 1909. Vauban and Vestris had passenger accommodation slightly larger than that of their older sister Vandyck. Since 1906 Lamport and Holt policy was to name its passenger liners after artists and engineers beginning with "V", they became known as "V-class ships".

Vestris was built as yard number 303 and launched 16 May 1912 and made her maiden voyage on 19 September 1912 from Liverpool to River Plate. She had five double-ended boilers to supply steam to a pair of quadruple-expansion engines. These drove twin screws and gave her a speed of 15 knots (28 km/h).

== Service history ==
Vandyck, Vauban and Vestris were intended for Lamport and Holt's service between Liverpool and Buenos Aires via Vigo, Leixões and Lisbon. But in 1911 the Royal Mail Steam Packet Company had taken over Lamport and Holt. RMSP chartered Vauban for a new and quicker service between Southampton and the River Plate, leaving Lamport and Holt unable to compete. RMSP returned Vauban to Lamport and Holt by the end of 1913, but effectively forced L&H out of the route between Britain and the River Plate.

Lamport and Holt then transferred Vandyck, Vauban and Vestris to strengthen its service between New York and the River Plate via Trinidad and Barbados, where they became the largest and most luxurious ships on the route. But soon after World War I began, the German cruiser SMS Karlsruhe captured and sank Vandyck on 26 October 1914.

Vestris was chartered as a troop ship to cross the Atlantic Ocean from the US to France. On 26 January 1918 a torpedo narrowly missed her in the English Channel.

Soon after WWI, Vasari, Vauban and Vestris began a triangular passenger service, sailing counter-clockwise from New York to the River Plate, from there to Liverpool and then by charter to Cunard Line from Liverpool to New York. In 1919 Vestris completed this circuit six times. By 1923 the three ships offered regular fortnightly sailings on the triangular route.

In September 1919, Vestris, carrying 550 people, suffered damage from a fire in her coal bunkers. The crew fought the fire for four days before either HMS Dartmouth or HMS Yarmouth escorted the ship to Saint Lucia in the West Indies. Several days later the fire was extinguished.

In 1922 the Royal Mail Steam Packet Company briefly chartered Vestris.

== Sinking ==
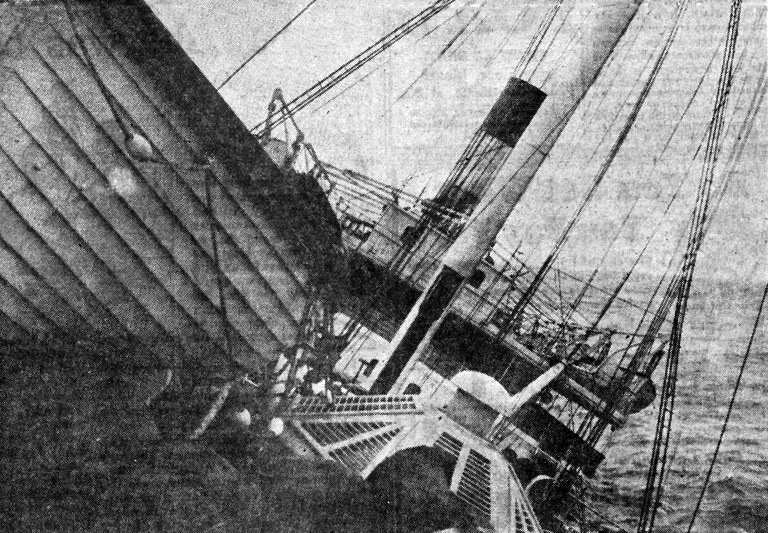
Vestris listing to starboard so badly that part of the upper deck was awash

On 10 November 1928, just before 16:00, Vestris left New York bound for the River Plate with 128 passengers and 198 crew. Her ballast tanks had not been pumped out, the hatches of her bunkers were buried under coal but had not been battened and secured, and she was overloaded below her load line marks. She may even have been listing slightly when she left port.

On 11 November she ran into a severe storm that flooded her boat deck and swept away two of her lifeboats. Part of her cargo and bunker coal shifted, causing the ship to list to starboard. About 19:30 that evening a heavy wave caused her to make a lurch further to starboard.

Overnight the water rose to the level of the floor-plates in the stokehold. Water was coming in through the ash ejector pipe and through some half-doors on her upper deck. The ship took on water faster than her pumps could remove it. By the morning of Monday 12 November she was rapidly taking on water and was almost on her beam ends.

At 09:56 Vestris sent an SOS message giving her position as latitude 37° 35' N. and longitude 71° 81' [sic] W., which was incorrect by about 37 miles (60 km). The SOS was repeated at 11:04.

Between 11:00 and noon, while the ship was off the Virginia Capes, her master gave the order to abandon ship. With the ship listing to starboard and the weather battering her on her port side, he ordered the port lifeboats to be launched first. The passengers included 13 children and 37 women, and they were put in the first boats to be loaded.

But the boats were still in their falls as the ship sank. Number 4 boat was never released, and was dragged down with the ship. Number 6 boat was cut away from her falls but stove in and sank. Number 8 boat was damaged while being lowered, managed to get clear of the ship, but was swamped and sank. Another of the port boats was successfully launched, then a davit broke free from the ship's boat deck, fell onto the lifeboat, sank it and killed several of its occupants. All of the children and 29 of the women were killed.

Between 14:00 and 14:30, Vestris capsized to starboard and went down bow-first at lat. 37° 38' N, long. 70° 23' W. There were still people trapped onboard the ship. The master was last seen walking down the port side of his ship, not wearing a lifebelt, and saying "My God. My God. I am not to blame for this." His chief officer also perished.

The first ship to come to the rescue did not arrive until about 17:45. Other ships joined her that evening and early on the morning of 13 November. They were the steamships American Shipper, Myriam, and Berlin and battleship USS Wyoming.

=== Death toll ===
Time and The New York Times reported that from the complement of 128 passengers and 198 crew on board, 111 people were killed: The same total was given at the official inquiry into the loss of Vestris.

- 68 dead or missing from a total 128 passengers. 60 passengers survived.
- 43 dead or missing from a total of 198 crew members. 155 crew survived.

None of the 13 children and only ten of the 39 women [both stewardesses and eight passengers] aboard the ship survived. The captain of Vestris, William J Carey, went down with his ship. 22 bodies were recovered by rescue ships.

The father of future Major League Baseball pitcher Sam Nahem was among those who drowned when the ship sank. Also two Indianapolis 500 starters in the 1928 race were among those dead. Norman Batten (finished 5th in 1928, his 3rd Indy 500 start) perished along with Earl Devore (18th in 1928, finished 2nd in 1927).

=== Aftermath ===
Press reports after the sinking were critical of the crew and management of Vestris. In the wake of the disaster, Lamport and Holt experienced a dramatic drop in bookings for the company's other liners and their service to South America ceased at the end of 1929.

Many inquiries and investigations were held into the sinking of Vestris. Criticism was made of:

- Overloading of the vessel
- The conduct of the master, officers and crew of the vessel
- Delays in issuing an SOS call
- Poor decisions made during deployment of the lifeboats, which led to two of the first three lifeboats to be launched (containing mostly women and children) sinking with Vestris and another being swamped
- Legal requirements governing lifeboats and out-dated life preservers
- Lack of radio sets in nearby vessels at the time

Lawsuits were brought after the sinking on behalf of 600 claimants totaling $5,000,000.

Vestris' sinking was covered by Associated Press reporter Lorena Hickok. Her story on the event became the first to appear in The New York Times under a woman's byline.

A pantryman on board, Fred Hanson, “took the only photos of the sinking ship….Hanson used a five-dollar pocket Kodak and took two rolls of pictures which he managed to preserve from water in a pocket of his coat.”

== Sources and further reading ==
- Dunn, Laurence (1973). Merchant Ships of the World in Colour 1910–1929. London: Blandford Press Ltd. pp. 110–111. ISBN 0-7137-0569-8.
- Heaton, Paul M (1986). Lamport & Holt. Newport: Starling Press. ISBN 0-950771-46-5.
- Heaton, Paul M (2004). Lamport & Holt Line. Abergavenny: PM Heaton Publishing. ISBN 1-872006-16-7.
- "SOS! – A challenge to science". Popular Science Monthly: 30–31. February 1929.
- Wilson, RM (1956). The Big Ships. London: Cassell & Co. pp. 221–223.
