= Willimantic =

Willimantic may refer to:

- Willimantic, Connecticut, village of Windham, in Windham County, Connecticut, United States
- Willimantic, Maine, town in Piscataquis County, Maine, United States
- USS Willimantic (ID-3549), United States Navy cargo ship
- Willimantic River, a tributary of the Shetucket River
