= SS Vauban =

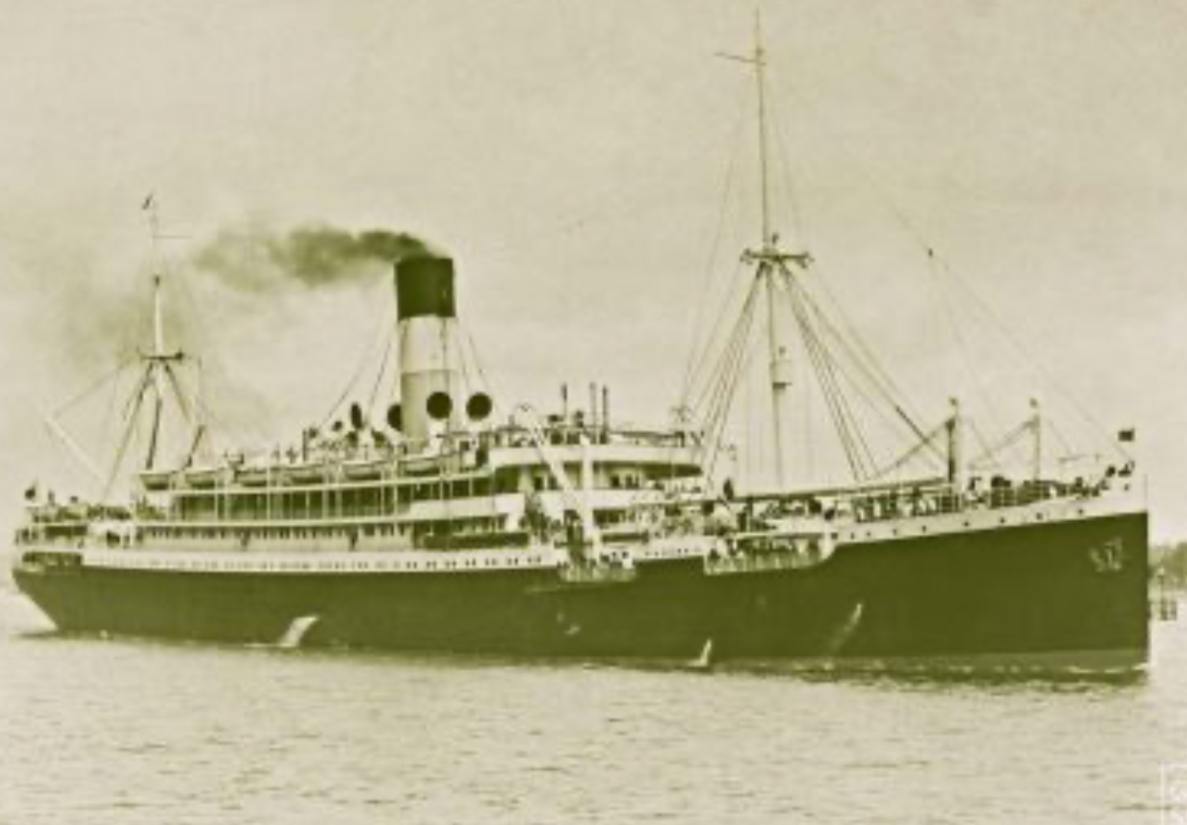

History

United Kingdom
- Name: Vauban
- Namesake: Sébastien Le Prestre de Vauban
- Owner: Liverpool, Brazil and River Plate Steam Navigation Co
- Operator: Lamport and Holt
- Port of registry: Liverpool
- Builder: Workman, Clark & Co, Belfast
- Launched: 20 January 1912
- Completed: April 1912
- In service: 1912
- Out of service: 1930
- Identification: UK official number 131432; Code letters HVPS
- Fate: Scrapped 1932

General characteristics
- Type: Ocean liner
- Tonnage: 10,660 GRT; tonnage under deck 6,673; 6,699 NRT; 17,200 DWT
- Length: 495 ft 6 in (151.03 m) registered; 511 feet (156 m) overall
- Beam: 60.8 ft (18.5 m)
- Depth: 28.7 ft (8.7 m)
- Decks: 4
- Installed power: 622 NHP, producing 8,000 IHP
- Propulsion: 2 × 4-cylinder quadruple-expansion engines, twin screw
- Speed: 15 knots (28 km/h)
- Capacity: Passengers: 280 First Class, 130 Second Class, 200 Third Class.; 5 cargo holds.
- Sensors & processing systems: submarine signalling; wireless direction finding
- Notes: sister ships: Vandyck, Vestris

SS Vauban was a 1912 steam ocean liner operated by Lamport and Holt Line and used on its service between New York and the River Plate. She was named after the French military engineer Sébastien Le Prestre de Vauban (1633–1707). She was a troop ship in the First World War, resumed passenger service until 1930 and was scrapped in 1932.

== Building ==
Vauban was the second of three sister ships that Workman, Clark and Company of Belfast built for Lamport and Holt in 1911–13. Vandyck was launched in 1911, Vauban in January 1912 and Vestris in May 1912. The trio were similar in size to Vasari that Sir Raylton Dixon & Co built for Lamport and Holt in 1909. Vauban and Vestris had passenger accommodation slightly larger than that of their older sister Vandyck. Since 1906 Lamport and Holt policy was to name its passenger liners after artists and engineers beginning with "V". Together they became known as "V-class ships".

Workman, Clark launched Vauban on 20 January 1912 and completed her that April. Her tonnages were 10,660 GRT, 6,699 NRT and 17,200 DWT. She was 511 ft (156 m) long overall, her registered length was 495 ft 6 in (151.03 m) and her beam was 60.8 ft (18.5 m).

She had five double-ended boilers to supply steam to a pair of Workman, Clark four-cylinder quadruple-expansion engines. Each engine had a 48-inch (120 cm) stroke and cylinders of 23-inch (58 cm), 32 1/2-inch (83 cm), 46 1/2-inch (118 cm) and 67-inch (170 cm) bore. The twin engines drove twin screws, giving her a service speed of 13.5 knots (25 km/h) and top speed of 15 knots (28 km/h).

She had capacity for 280 first class, 130 second class and 200 third class passengers, and five cargo holds.

== Service history ==
Vandyck, Vauban and Vestris were intended for Lamport and Holt's service between Liverpool and Buenos Aires via Vigo and Leixões and Lisbon. But in 1911 the Royal Mail Steam Packet Company had taken over Lamport and Holt. RMSP chartered Vauban for a new and quicker service between Southampton and the River Plate. For this she was briefly renamed Alcala and repainted in RMSP colours. By the end of 1913 RMSP had returned Vauban to Lamport and Holt and restored her to her original name and colours. However, RMSP effectively forced L&H out of the route between Britain and the River Plate.

Lamport and Holt then transferred Vandyck, Vauban and Vestris to strengthen its service between New York and the River Plate via Barbados and Trinidad, where they became the largest and most luxurious ships on the route. But in July 1914 World War I began and on 26 October that year the German cruiser SMS Karlsruhe captured and sank Vandyck. Later in the war Vauban was chartered as a troop ship to carry US troops.

In 1919 Vauban, Vestris and the older Vasari began a triangular passenger service, sailing anti-clockwise from New York to the River Plate, from there to Liverpool and then by charter to Cunard Line from Liverpool via Queenstown to New York. The Cunard charter continued until 1921. By 1923 the three ships offered regular fortnightly sailings on the triangular route.

In November 1928 Vestris foundered in a heavy sea with the loss of at least 110 lives. Both the sinking and the loss of life were attributed to Lamport and Holt's negligence. The adverse publicity led the company to withdraw its passenger service. Vauban was returned to Britain and laid up at Southampton from September 1930. In January 1932 she was sold for scrap to Thos. W. Ward of Milford Haven for just £8,500.

== Bibliography ==
- Dunn, Laurence (1973). Merchant Ships of the World in Colour 1910–1929. London: Blandford Press Ltd. pp. 110–111. ISBN 0-7137-0569-8.
- Heaton, Paul M (2004). Lamport & Holt Line. Abergavenny: PM Heaton Publishing. ISBN 1-872006-16-7.
- Miller, William H (2016). The Ships of Ellis Island. Amberley Publishing. p. 124. ISBN 978-1-44565-163-7.
