= List of ships named Baudouinville =

Baudouinville may refer to ships formerly operated by the Compagnie Belge Maritime du Congo and Compagnie Maritime Belge:

- SS Baudouinville (1937), launched in 1937 and operated to 1940. Seized by Germany and renamed Lindau. Scuttled in 1944 and scrapped in 1946.
- MS Baudouinville (1950), launched in 1950, renamed Thysville in 1957 and operated to 1961. Then sold and named Anselm (1961–1963), Iberia Star (1963–1965), and Australasia (1965–1973). Scrapped in 1973.
- SS Baudouinville (1957), launched in 1957 and operated to 1961. Then sold and named Cathay (1961–1976), Kengshin (1976–1977), and Shanghai (1977–1996). Scrapped in 1996.
SS Baudouinville (1937)

MS Baudouinville (1950)

SS Baudouinville (1957)
