= SS Elisabethville (1921) =

Ocean liner built in 1921

- SS Elisabethville, photographed in 1939.

History
- Name: Elisabethville (1921–47); Empire Bure (1947–50); Charlton Star (1950–58); Maristrella (1958–60)
- Namesake: Elisabethville (now Lubumbashi)
- Owner: Compagnie Belge Maritime du Congo (1921–30); Compagnie Maritime Belge (1930–40); Ministry of War Transport (1940–45); Ministry of Transport (1945–46); Compagnie Maritime Belge (1946–47); Ministry of Transport (1947–50); Charlton Steamship Co Ltd (1950–58); Navigation Maristrella SA (1958–60)
- Operator: Compagnie Belge Maritime du Congo (1921–30); Agence Maritime Internationale (1930–40); Lamport & Holt Line (1940–46); Compagnie Maritime Belge (1946–47); Lamport & Holt Line (1947–49); Chandris (England) Ltd (1950–57); AJ & DJ Chandris (1958–60)
- Port of registry: (Belgium) Antwerp (1921–47); United Kingdom (1947–58); Liberia (1958–60)
- Route: Antwerp – Matadi (1924–40)
- Builder: J Cockerill SA, Hoboken
- Yard number: 562
- Launched: 19 May 1921
- Completed: November 1921
- Identification: code letters MENV (1921–33); call sign OPEA (1934–47); UK official number 181651 (1947–58); Liberian Official Number 1219 (1958–60)
- Fate: Scrapped

General characteristics
- Tonnage: 8,178 GRT (1921–30); 8,851 GRT (1930–60); 4,869 NRT
- Length: 439 ft 1 in (133.83 m)
- Beam: 57 ft (17.37 m)
- Draught: 37 ft (11.28 m)
- Depth: 34 ft 1 in (10.39 m)
- Propulsion: 2 × quadruple expansion steam engines
- Speed: 14 knots (26 km/h)
- Capacity: 700 passengers in one class
- Sensors & processing systems: wireless direction finding (by 1930)
- Notes: sister ship: Thysville

Elisabethville was an 8,851 GRT ocean liner which was built in 1921 for Compagnie Belge Maritime du Congo. In 1930 the company became Compagnie Maritime Belge. She served the Antwerp - Matadi route, connecting Belgium to Belgian Congo.

Elisabethville was named after a city in what was then Belgian Congo. The city is now Lubumbashi, which is the second largest city in the Democratic Republic of the Congo, only behind the capital Kinshasa.

In 1940 Elisabethville was requisitioned by the Ministry of War Transport (MoWT) for use as a troopship. She briefly returned to merchant service in 1946 before being requisitioned again in 1947 for further troopship duties, and rechristened the Empire Bure.

She was then laid up before being sold in 1950 to Charlton Steamship Co. and was renamed Charlton Star. In 1958 she was sold to Greek owners and renamed Maristrella, serving until she was scrapped in 1960.

== Description ==
Elisabethville was built by J Cockerill SA, Hoboken Belgium for Compagnie Belge Maritime du Congo. Her yard number was 562. Elisabethville was launched on 19 May 1921 and completed in November 1921. She had an exact sister ship, Thysville, that was completed in June 1922.

The ship was 439 feet 1 inch (133.83 m) long, with a beam of 57 feet (17.37 m) and a depth of 34 feet 1 inch (10.39 m). As built, her tonnages were 8,178 GRT and 4,869 NRT. She had accommodation for 700 passengers in a single class.

The ship had twin quadruple expansion steam engines, with cylinders of 48-inch (120 cm) stroke and 23-inch (58 cm), 33-inch (84 cm), 47-inch (120 cm) and 67-inch (170 cm) bore. The engine was built by SA J Cockerill, Seraing, Belgium. Between them they developed 964 NHP, giving her a speed of 14 knots (26 km/h). The engines were fed by six 215 lb_{f}/in^{2} single-ended boilers with a total heating surface of 14,100 square feet (1,310 m^{2}). Her boilers were heated by 18 corrugated furnaces with a grate surface of 345 square feet (32 m^{2}).

== Career ==
Elisabethville was operated by Compagnie Belge Maritime du Congo, which in 1930 became Compagnie Maritime Belge (CMB). She was used on the Antwerp – Matadi route. In 1930 Elisabethville was rebuilt, which increased her tonnage to 8,351 GRT. She was placed under the management of Agence Maritime Internationale.

In 1940 she was requisitioned by the MoWT for use as a troopship under the management of Lamport & Holt Line, entering service on 16 December 1940. On 3 February 1947 she was returned to CMB, returning to Antwerp on 7 March. On 18 March Elisabethville was requisitioned by the Ministry of Transport and renamed Empire Bure. In 1949 she was laid up in Holy Loch.

In 1950 she was sold to Charlton Steamship Co and renamed Charlton Star. The ship was refitted as an ocean liner by Beliard, Crichton & Co, Greenock. She was towed to Antwerp by the tug Turmoil, arriving on 3 April 1950. Charlton Star was operated under the management of Chandris (England) Ltd. In 1952, during the Suez Crisis, Charlton Star was used as an accommodation ship at Tobruk. She served until 1957 when she was laid up at La Spezia, Italy.

In 1958 Charlton Star was sold to Navigation Maristrella SA, Monrovia and renamed Maristrella, operating under the management of AJ & DJ Chandris, Greece. She served with Chandris for a couple of years before she was scrapped at Osaka, Japan, arriving for scrapping on 19 January 1960.

== Identification details ==
Official numbers were a forerunner to IMO Numbers. Empire Bure and Charlton Star had the United Kingdom Official Number 181651. Maristrella had the Liberian Official Number 1219.

Elisabethville used the code letters MENV until 1933 and the call sign OPEA from 1934.

== Culture and media ==
A painting of Elisabethville on her maiden voyage in May 1921 was made by Belgian artist Eugeen Van Mieghem.
