= Lamport and Holt =

Defunct UK merchant shipping line

- House flag
- Industry: maritime transport
- Founded: 1845
- Founder: WJ Lamport, George Holt
- Defunct: 30 June 1991
- Fate: taken over
- Headquarters: Liverpool (1845–1980s); London (1980s–1991)
- Owner: Royal Mail Steam Packet Company 1911–44; Vestey Group 1944–91

Lamport and Holt was a UK merchant shipping line. It was founded as a partnership in 1845, reconstituted as a limited company in 1911 and ceased trading in 1991.

From 1845 until 1975 Lamport and Holt was headquartered in Liverpool. The founders of Booth Line and Blue Funnel Line had family links with the original partners in Lamport and Holt, and worked for them before founding their own steamship lines in the 1860s.

Lamport and Holt was an independent partnership until 1911, when it became a limited company and the Royal Mail Steam Packet Company (RMSP) took it over. RMSP collapsed as a result of the Royal Mail Case in 1931 but was reconstituted as Royal Mail Lines in 1932. Vestey Group bought Lamport and Holt in 1944 and absorbed it into its Blue Star Line subsidiary in 1991.

For much of its history Lamport and Holt traded with the east coast of South America, operating liner services there to and from New York, Britain and mainland Europe. from 1902 to 1928 it operated a significant passenger ocean liner service and from 1932 to 1939 it ran cruise ships.

Lamport and Holt carried cargo for the UK government in the Crimean War, World War I, World War II and Falklands War. In each World War it operated troopships and lost numerous ships and personnel to enemy action.

From 1932 Liverpool City Council authorised the company to fly the city's civic flag when in port. It is the only shipping company to have been granted this privilege.

== Founding ==
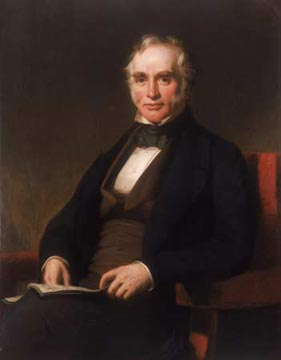
George Holt, senior, in 1851

William James Lamport (1815–1874) was born in Lancaster, Lancashire, the son of a Unitarian minister. In the 1830s he started work in the office of Gibbs, Bright and Company in Liverpool, where he learnt commerce and ship management. His brother Charles Lamport became the proprietor of a shipyard in Workington, Cumberland.

George Holt, junior (1824–96) was one of five sons born to George Holt, senior (1790–1861) and his wife Emma. George senior was a cotton broker in Liverpool. George junior was apprenticed to the shipping line of Thomas and John Brocklebank, where he met WJ Lamport.

In 1845 the two young men formed a partnership to own and manage merchant ships. WJ Lamport was 30 years old and George Lamport junior was 21. Their original trade was cotton from Egypt to Liverpool to supply Lancashire cotton mills, but they soon expanded their trade to India, New Zealand, Australia, the US and South America.

The partners' first ship was the 335 ton barque Christabel, which James Alexander of Workington built new for them and launched on 17 September. Traditionally the ownership of merchant ships was divided into 64 shares. George Lamport senior helped to establish the business by buying a controlling interest of 34 shares in the new ship. After barely two months, on 14 November, George senior transferred his shares to the young partners, making them the controlling owners.

== House flag and funnel colours ==
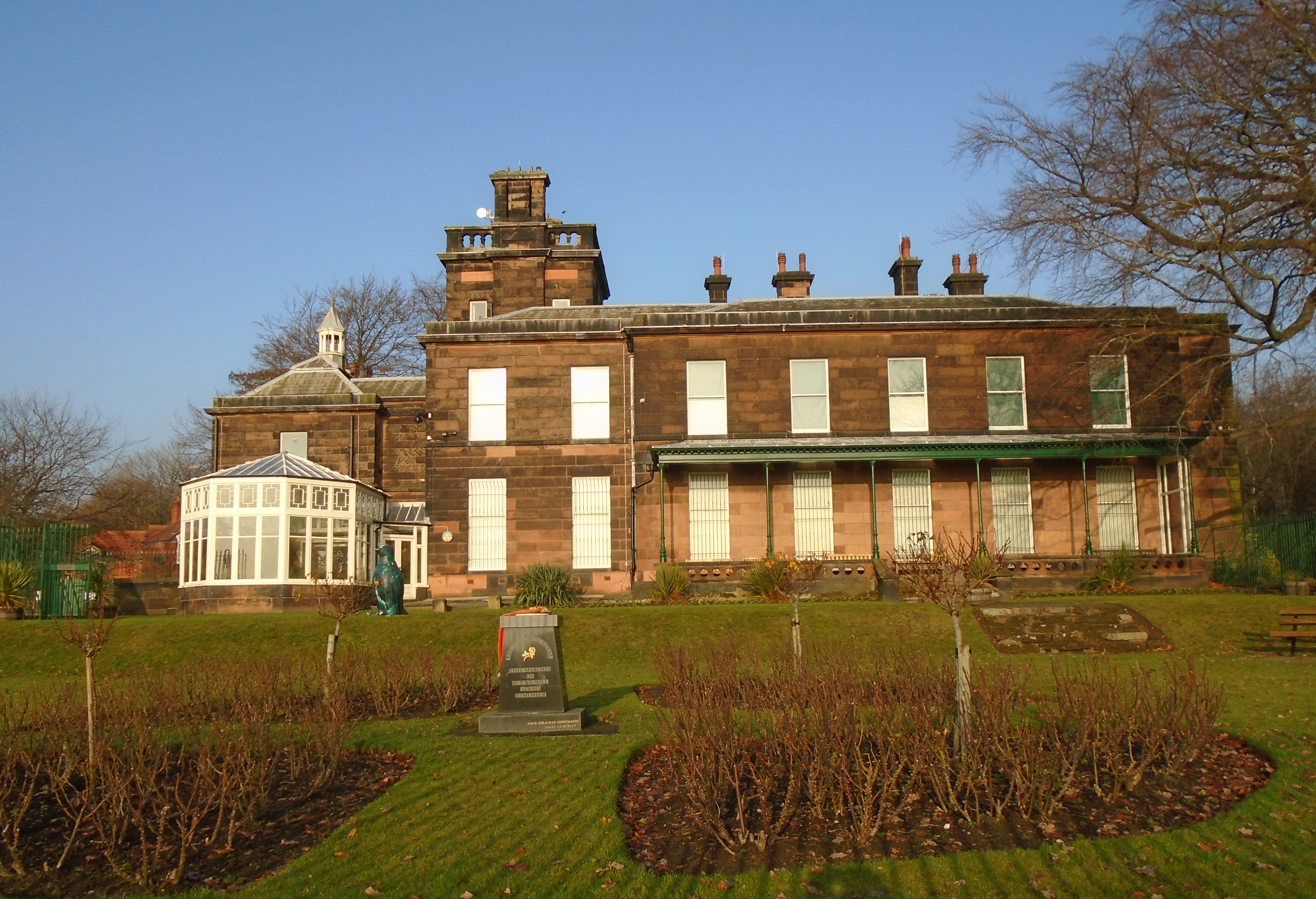
Sudley House in Liverpool, the former home of George Holt, junior

A mid-19th-century painting of the three-masted sailing ship Emma, which Lamport and Holt owned from 1847 to 1852, shows her flying a house flag from her foremast of three horizontal bars. The top and bottom bars are scarlet, and the middle bar is white defaced with the initials "L&H" in black. This remained Lamport and Holt's house flag throughout its 146 years of trading. The painting is now in George Holt junior's former home in Liverpool, Sudley House, which is now a museum and art gallery.

When Lamport and Holt started to operate steamships in the 1860s they adopted pale blue as the main colour for the funnel, with a black top and a white band below the white top. Early evidence for this includes a painting of a steamship, the 1,585 GRT Galileo that Lamport and Holt operated from 1864 to 1869. The blue was a pale shade like that of the flag of Argentina.

In 1932 Liverpool City Council presented Lamport and Holt with the city's colours and granted permission for the company's ships to fly the Liverpool Civic Flag when in port. At the same time Lamport and Holt darkened the blue of its funnels to match the civic colours.

In 1936 the proportions of Lamport and Holt's funnel colours were in sevenths. The lowest three sevenths of the funnel were blue, the top two sevenths black and the two sevenths between were white.

== Early growth ==
Lamport and Holt expanded their fleet. Their second ship was a larger barque, the 677 ton Junior, which was built in Quebec. Her first captain was John Eils, who had 16 shares in her and became a minority investor in many of Lamport and Holt's early fleet. By 1850 the partnership had a fleet of 10 sailing ships.

In 1850 Lamport and Holt started to invest in steamships by buying minority shares in ships operated by another Liverpool shipping line, James Moss & Co. Others who invested in James Moss's steamships in 1850 included WJ Lamport's cousin Charles Booth (1840–1916), who with his brother Alfred went on to found Alfred Booth and Company in 1863.

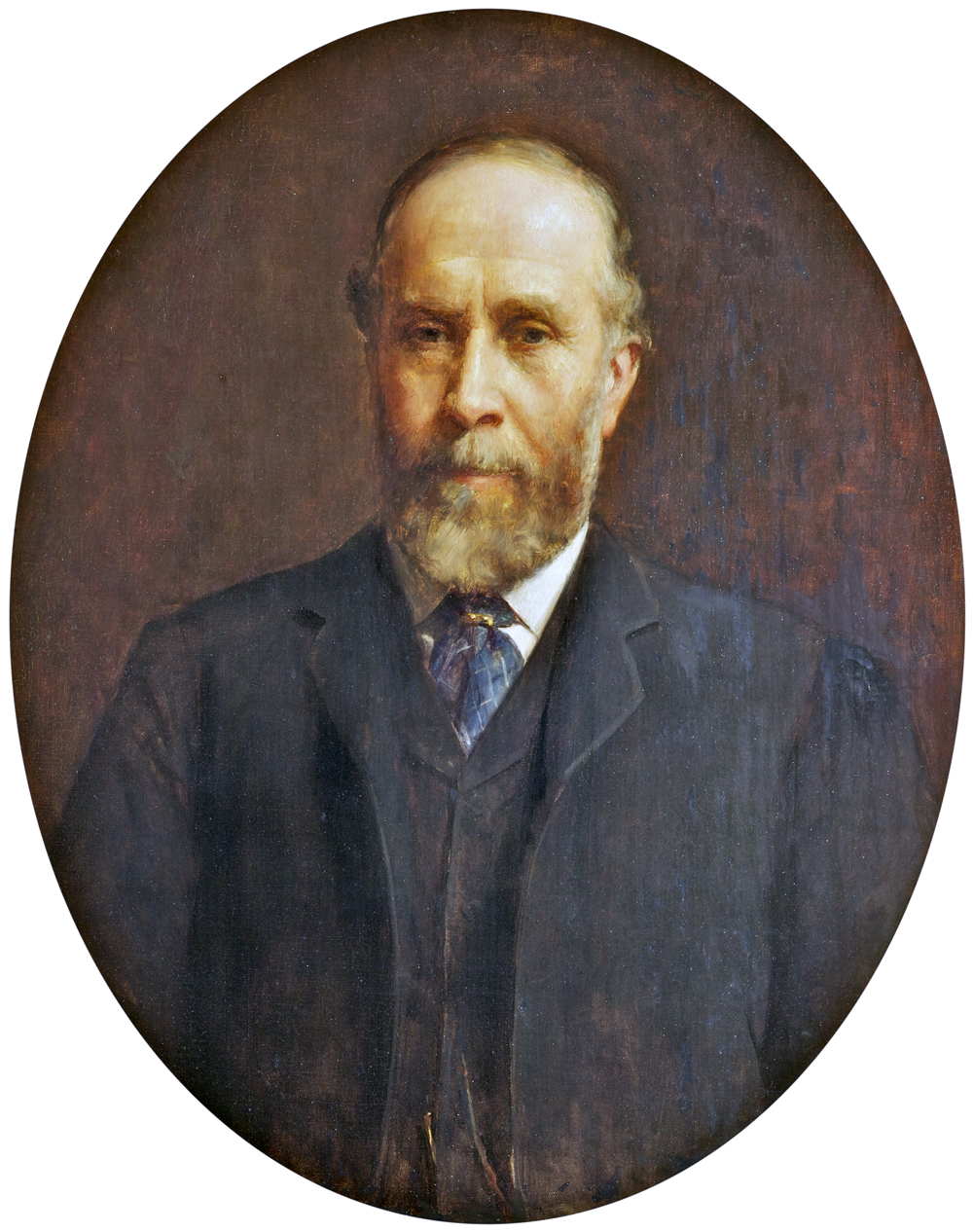
Alfred Holt before 1903

Two of George Holt junior's brothers were apprenticed to Lamport and Holt: Alfred Holt from 1850 to 1857 and Charles Holt from 1855 to 1862. Alfred had been apprenticed to a railway engineer and became head of Lamport and Holt's engineering department. Another brother, Philip Holt, was a partner in Lamport and Holt. In 1866 Alfred and Philip Holt founded their own shipping company, which became Blue Funnel Line.

Lamport and Holt continued to invest in sailing ships. In 1850 Charles Holt in Workington built the first of his ships for the partnership: the 407-ton Cathaya. In the Crimean War (1853–56) the UK government chartered steamships to carry troops and cavalry and sailing ships to carry stores. In February 1856 a Lamport and Holt sailing ship, the 697-ton Simoda, was wrecked off the Dardanelles. The partnership replaced her with the newly built Agenoria which at 1,023 tons was the largest ship Lamport and Holt had yet owned.

The first steamship in which the partnership had a controlling interest was the 189-ton Zulu which they bought in 1857 from Scotts in Greenock. But they sold her in 1858 and continued trade with a fleet of 17 sailing ships.

== Liverpool, Brazil and River Plate Steam Navigation Co Ltd ==
In 1861 Lamport and Holt finally committed to operating steamships by obtaining the 1,290 GRT Memnon from Scotts. In 1862 Andrew Leslie of Hebburn, County Durham built the 1,372 GRT Copernicus to join her. Each of the two new steamships had an iron hull and was rigged as a brig. They joined James Moss & Co's steamships on a joint trade between Liverpool and the Mediterranean. Copernicus began Lamport and Holt's custom of naming its steamships after notable scientists and artists.

Lamport and Holt operated purely as a partnership for their first two decades of trading. On 18 December 1865 they added a limited company, the Liverpool, Brazil and River Plate Steam Navigation Co Ltd, to own their steamships. However, they continued to own and operate sailing ships under the traditional system of 64 shares.

Until the 1860s the Empire of Brazil banned foreign ships from the Brazilian coastal shipping trade. Foreign ships could bring imports to Brazil and take exports abroad, and they could move between Brazilian ports in doing so, but they could not take a Brazilian cargo from one Brazilian port to another. In 1862 its National Congress voted to suspend this protectionism for the years 1863 and 1864. It repeated the suspension several times until 1873, when the suspension was made permanent.

At first Lamport and Holt was the only foreign company to take up the new freedom. By the late 1860s it was running a coastal service between Rio de Janeiro and Rio Grande do Sul. Lamport and Holt won a mail contract from the Brazilian government in 1868, soon followed by one with the UK General Post Office. In 1872 Brazil founded a Companhia Nacional de Navegação a Vapor ("National Steam Navigation Company"), but Lamport and Holt continued to compete with it for coastal trade.

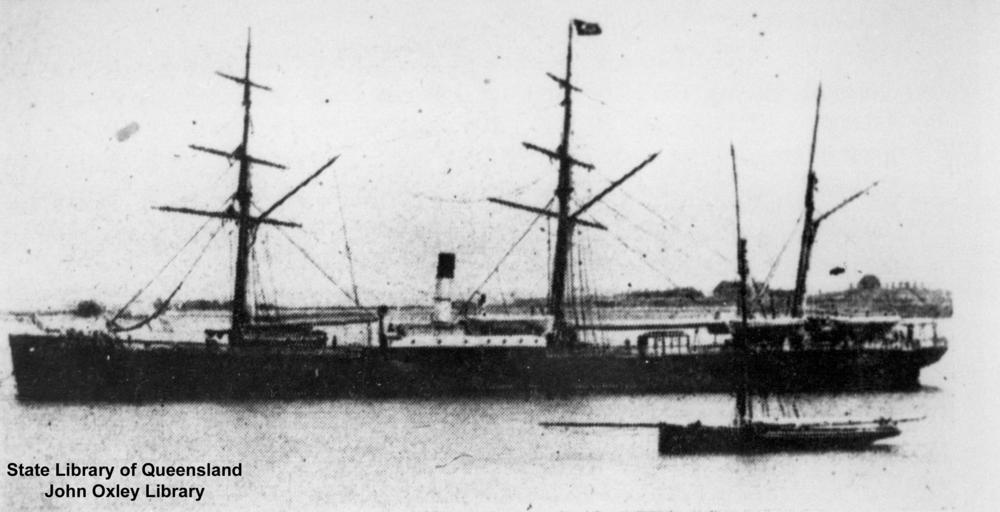
Alfred Holt Ltd's Agamemnon, the first steamship to use the benefits of a compound engine by running at a higher boiler pressure

Early steamships had simple engines with high coal consumption. They offered more reliable journey times than sailing ships, but at a high cost. The large amount of coal that had to be carried reduced space for cargo, so that many longer routes were economically unfeasible. A compound engine achieved much better fuel economy, but generally required higher boiler pressures than were currently allowed by the Board of Trade. (Note: At the start of the 1860s, the Board of Trade typically allowed a steam pressure of 20 psi (140 kPa), which was insufficient to realise the benefits of a compound engine. SS Carnatic, launched in 1863, had a boiler pressure of only 26 psi (180 kPa), but used a large amount of superheat to overcome this disadvantage. Alfred Holt, after experimenting in the test bed Cleator, persuaded the Board of Trade to allow 60 psi (410 kPa). Not only did Alfred Holt achieve this key negotiation, but he then designed an easily driven, light but strong ship's hull and a compact compound engine to power it. SS Agamemnon and her two sister ships were able to compete in trade to China before the opening of the Suez Canal in 1869 and created the model for the fuel efficient, long-distance steamship.) In 1865 George Holt junior's brother Alfred Holt introduced Agamemnon, the first ship authorised by the Board of Trade to use the higher boiler pressure of 60 psi (410 kPa), so benefitting from her compound engine. This increased fuel efficiency, reduced coal consumption and enabled steamships to take more trade from sailing ships. Between 1864 and 1867 Lamport and Holt's LB&SP Navigation company bought 20 steamships, all but one of which were newly built to its own specification.

The last sailing ship built for Lamport and Holt was the 1,350 GRT Sarah J. Ellis, which was completed in New Brunswick in 1869. Lamport and Holt sold her in 1871. The last sailing ship in the Lamport and Holt fleet may have been the Southern Queen, which was bought nearly new in 1866 and sold in 1880.

WJ Lamport died in 1874 aged 59. At the time of his death the fleet had 31 ships and totalled 48,236 GRT. Lamport was succeeded in the partnership by Walter Holland, who had been an apprentice with Lamport at Gibbs, Bright & Co. Another long-serving employee, Charles Jones, was also made a partner.

In 1886 Lamport and Holt got its first contract to carry frozen meat from the River Plate. In 1887 the 1,501 GRT cargo steamship Thales was converted into the partnership's first refrigerated cargo ship.

Also in the 1880s Lamport and Holt extended its trade to Valparaíso in Chile. This trade continued until 1896.

== Competition to carry Brazilian coffee ==
In 1869 the LB&RP Steam Navigation Co's 1,637 GRT steamship Halley became the first iron-hulled ship to carry coffee from Brazil to New York. Hitherto it was believed that an iron hull would taint the flavour of coffee, so it had to be carried in wooden-hulled ships. This was the first time a Lamport and Holt ship had sailed directly between South America and the US. Lamport and Holt became a major operator on the route, establishing a triangular trade. Its ships took raw materials such as wheat from the US to the UK, manufactured goods from the UK to Brazil and coffee from Brazil to the US.

A US company, the United States and Brazil Mail Steamship Company, tried to circumvent the triangular trade by taking manufactured products from the US to Brazil and coffee from Brazil to the US. But the company, popularly called simply the "Brazil Line", made the mistake of rejecting compound steam engines and continuing to use inefficient simple ones. Although both the Brazilian and US governments subsidized the Brazil Line, its high fuel costs prevented it from competing with Lamport and Holt's freight rates. In 1875 the US Government ended its subsidy to the Brazil Line, which for the moment left Lamport and Holt without a competitor.

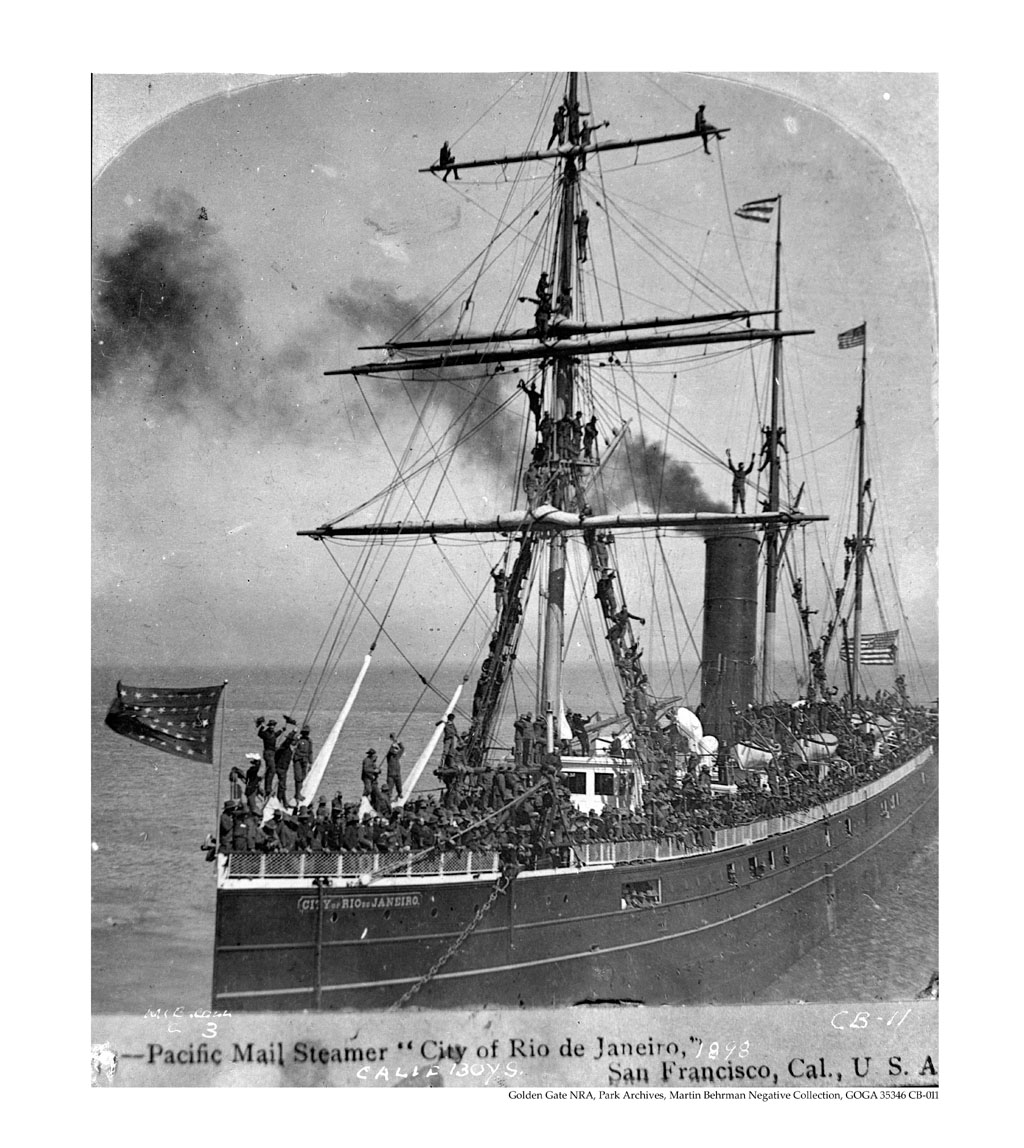
The Brazil Line steamship City of Rio de Janeiro, which competed against Lamport and Holt 1878–81

In 1877 the Brazilian Emperor Pedro II of Brazil awarded the Brazil Line a new subsidy to operate compound steamships. City of Rio de Janeiro was built in Chester, Pennsylvania and launched in 1878. Lamport and Holt lobbied the Brazilian Chamber of Deputies to stop subsidising the Brazil Line. The Emperor temporarily paid the subsidy from his own budget.

Lamport and Holt retaliated by scheduling its ships to leave Brazilian ports a few days before Brazil Line departures, and would even keep a ship stationed in Rio de Janeiro any time that a Brazil Line ship was in port. Lamport and Holt also waged a rate war against the Brazil Line. The British company thus managed to secure most of the Brazilian coffee cargoes to the US and left Brazil Line ships often sailing north only half-laden. In 1881 the Brazil Line again withdrew from the competition. City of Rio de Janeiro was sold to the Pacific Mail Steamship Company.

In 1883 the Brazilian Chamber of Deputies awarded the Brazil Line a subsidy large enough to compete with Lamport and Holt. In 1890 the Brazil Line introduced two new ships. But UK-owned merchant houses, warehouses, insurers and banks supported Lamport and Holt, and the Brazil Line went bankrupt in 1893.

== Societé de Navigation Royale Belge Sud-Americaine ==
Since 1866 Lamport and Holt had traded with Antwerp and in 1877 they won a Belgian government mail contract to and from Brazil, Uruguay and Argentina. The contract required all ships on the service to be registered in Belgium, so Lamport and Holt founded a Belgian subsidiary, Societé de Navigation Royale Belge Sud-Americaine. In 1877 the 1,629 GRT steamship Copernicus was transferred from the LB&RP SN Co to the new company and its registration transferred to Antwerp. In 1878 seven other LB&RP steamships followed. Lamport and Holt's Belgian operation continued until 1908.

As the initial Royal Belge Sud-Americaine fleet came due for replacement, Lamport and Holt tended to replace its ships with others second-hand from LB&RP. The 2,267 GRT Galileo, built in 1873, was transferred in 1886. The 2,280 GRT Leibnitz, also built in 1873, was transferred in 1889. The 2,605 GRT Maskelyne and 2,583 GRT Hevelius, both built in 1874, were also transferred in 1889. The 2,610 GRT Coleridge, built in 1875, was transferred in 1890.

== Argentine Steam Lighter Co Ltd ==
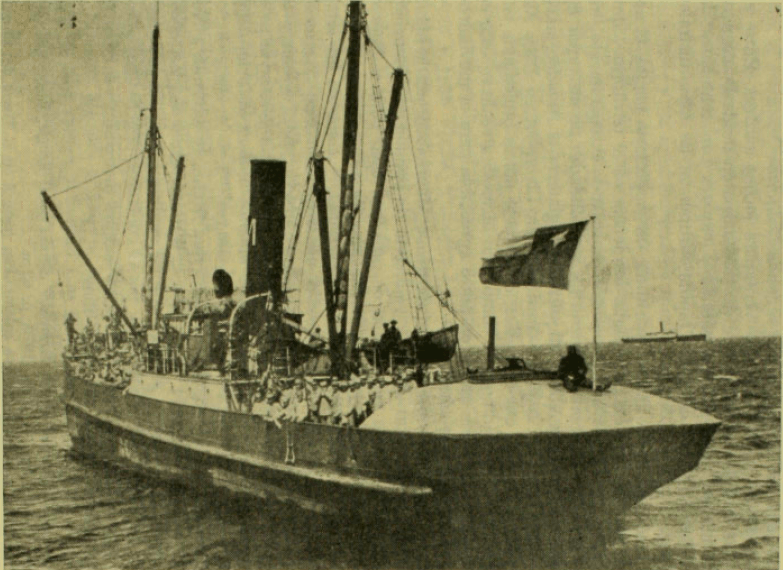
Amadeo after her sale to Chilean owners

In 1884 Lamport and Holt formed another subsidiary, the Argentine Steam Lighter Co Ltd, to run a feeder cargo service in the River Plate. Its vessels ranged from 300 GRT to 700 GRT. They were registered in Liverpool but their survey port was Montevideo or Buenos Aires. The company operated until about 1900.

The lighter company's first ship was the 411 GRT Amadeo, built in Liverpool in 1884. In 1892 she was sold to Chilean owners and re-registered in Punta Arenas. In the 1930s she was beached at San Gregorio in the Strait of Magellan. Her rusting hulk survives there to this day.

== Further growth ==
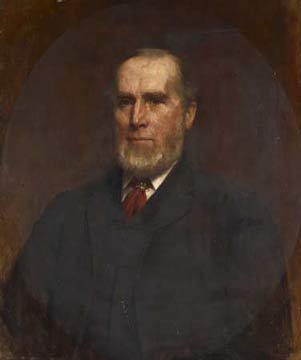
George Holt, junior, in 1892

In 1888 Lamport and Holt had a fleet of 50 ships totalling 93,331 GRT. In 1890 its number of ships peaked at 59, totalling 109,493 GRT. Thereafter the number of ships declined but the average tonnage per ship increased and so did the total tonnage of the fleet. In the 1890s three new partners joined Lamport and Holt: George Holt's nephew George Melly, Charles Jones' son Sidney Jones, and one Arthur Cook. George Holt died in 1896 after more than 50 years in the business.

Between 1898 and 1902 a dozen new steamships were completed for LB&SP. Five of these were designed to carry livestock on the hoof from Argentina to the UK. The smallest, the 4,501 GRT Romney completed in 1899, was built by Sir Raylton Dixon and Company on the River Tees. The other four were built by D. and W. Henderson and Company on the River Clyde. They included the sister ships Raeburn and Rosetti, both completed in 1900, which at 6,511 GRT and 6,540 GRT respectively were the largest ships in the Lamport and Holt fleet. All five of the livestock carriers had names beginning with "R", and although they were not all sisters they became called the "R-class".

In 1902 Furness Withy put a pair of modern 3,900 GRT cargo liners up for sale. Alexander Stephen and Sons had built Evangeline in 1900 and Loyalist in 1901. Lamport and Holt bought them for the LB&SP fleet and renamed them Tennyson and Byron respectively. The pair had more passenger berths than was usual in the LB&SP fleet, so Lamport and Holt put them on the route between New York and the River Plate.

== V-class liners ==
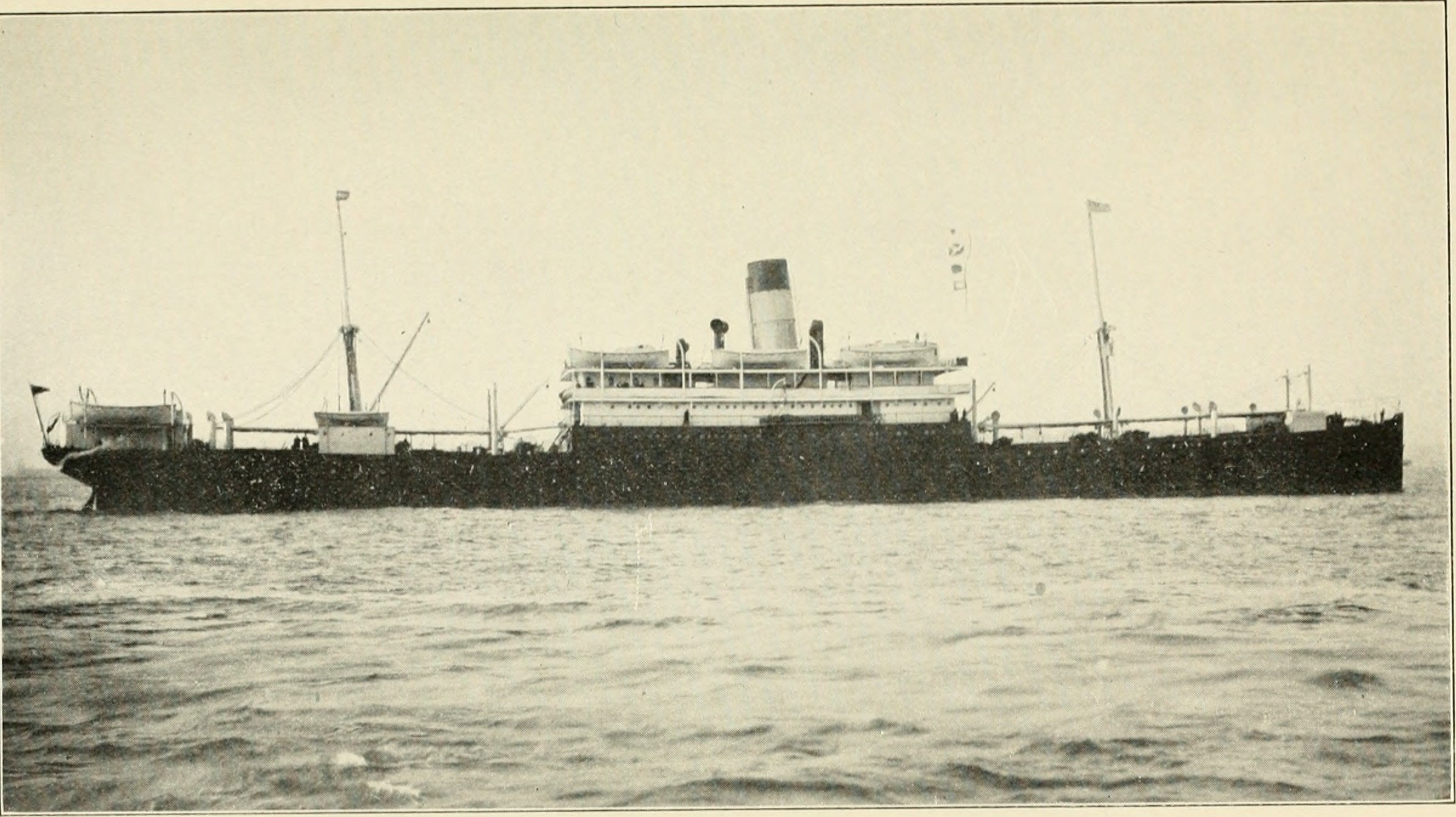
Verdi, completed in 1907

The increase in passenger capacity on the route was a commercial success, so Lamport and Holt ordered four new liners with even more passenger capacity and refrigerated cargo space. Sir Raylton Dixon completed the 7,542 GRT Velasquez in 1906. Workman, Clark and Company of Belfast completed the 7,877 GRT Veronese in 1906 and 7,120 GRT Verdi in 1907. Later in 1907 D&W Henderson completed the Voltaire, which at 8,615 GRT was Lamport and Holt's largest ship yet. All five of the new liners had names beginning with "V", and although they were not all sisters they were the first of what became the "V-class".

The route included calls in the Caribbean and at Salvador, Rio de Janeiro and Santos. Tennyson and Byron tended to work only as far south as Santos, while the "V-class" continued to the River Plate.

On 16 October 1908 Velasquez was heading north with 137 passengers and a cargo of coffee and mail. After leaving Santos she ran into a high sea and thick fog and struck rocks off Ponta da Sela near Ilhabela in Brazil. Her passengers and crew were successfully transferred to her lifeboats, which stood off from the wreck until daybreak. They then took everyone ashore at the beach of Praia do Veloso with no loss of life.

On 17 October Lamport and Holt's 2,679 GRT steamship Milton left Santos to look for Velasquez. She found and rescued the passengers and crew on the beach, and salvaged the mails and some of the passengers' baggage from the wreck. Attempts to salvage Velasquez were unsuccessful and her insurers wrote her off as a total loss.

Lamport and Holt replaced Velasquez on the New York – River Plate route with the 10,117 GRT liner Vasari, which was built by Sir Raylton Dixon & Co and launched in 1909. She was considerably larger than Voltaire and the first Lamport and Holt ship of more than 10,000 GRT.

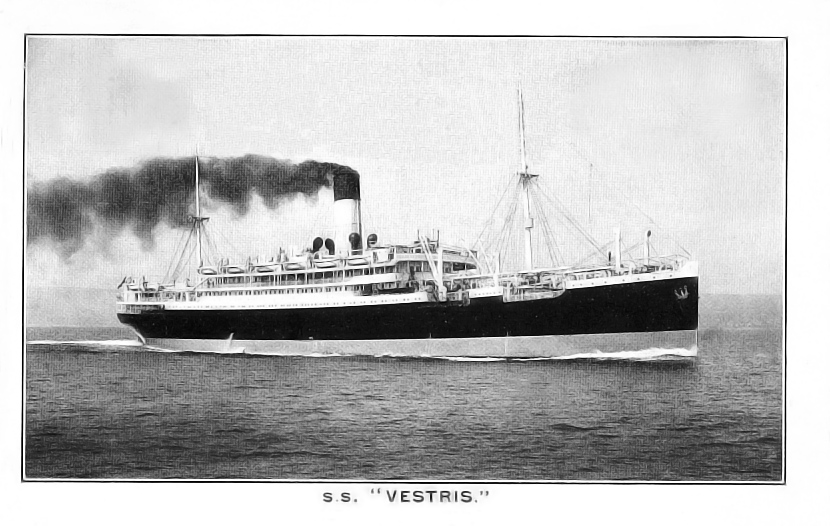
Vestris, completed in 1912

Lamport and Holt decided that its route between Liverpool and the River Plate via Vigo, Leixões and Lisbon should also have 10,000 GRT liners, so in 1910 it ordered three sister ships from Workman, Clark & Co. The first to be delivered was the 10,327 GRT Vandyck, launched in June 1911. She was followed by the 10,660 GRT Vauban in January 1912 and 10,494 GRT Vestris in May 1912, each of which had berths for slightly more passengers than Vandyck. Each of the trio had a top speed of 15 knots (28 km/h).

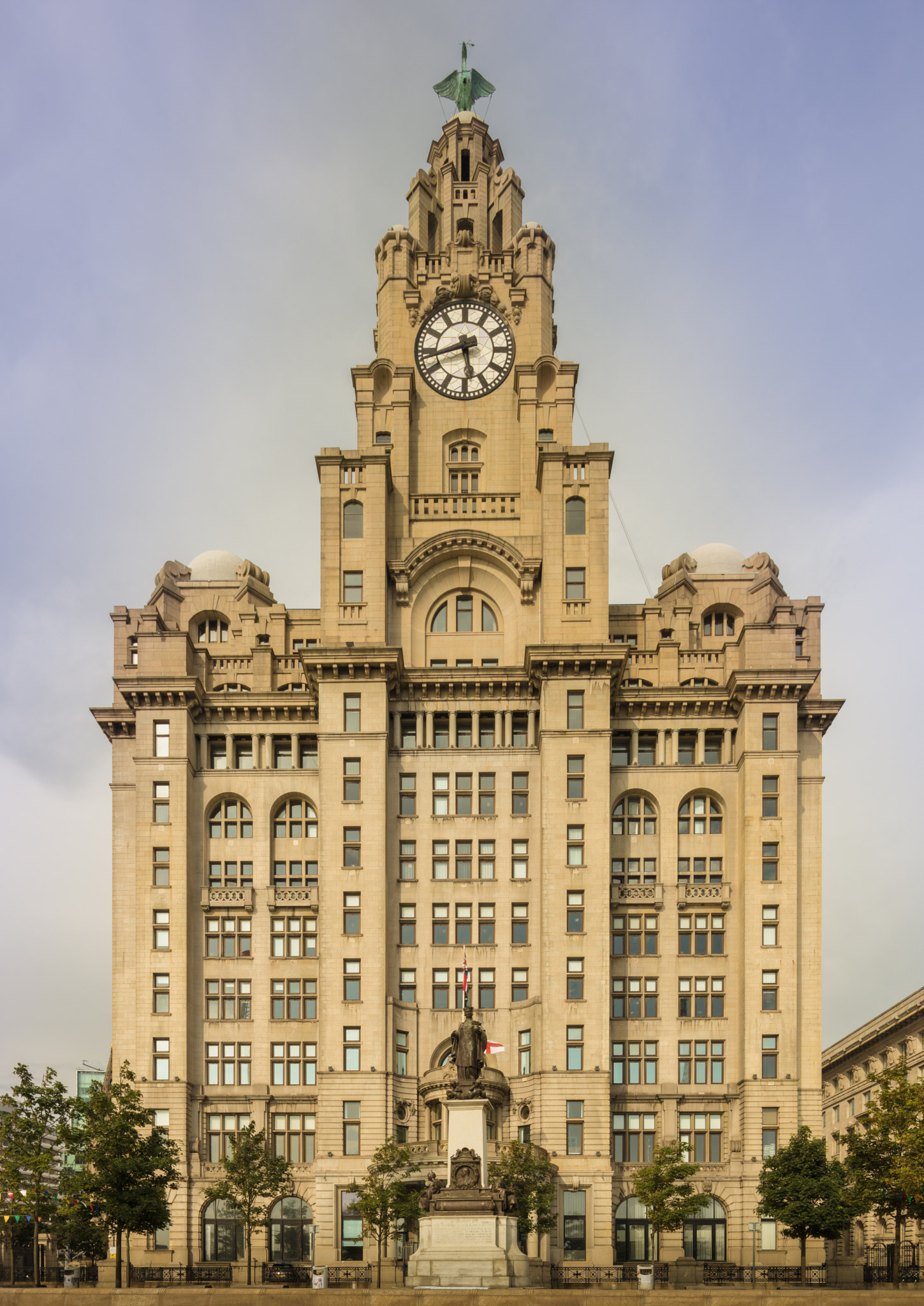
The Royal Liver Building, where Lamport and Holt was headquartered from 1912 to 1975.

Also in 1911 Lamport and Holt was converted from a partnership into a limited company. The Royal Mail Steam Packet Company quickly took advantage of this and took over Lamport and Holt. In 1912 management of the company was moved from Lamport and Holt's offices in Fenwick Street, Liverpool to the RMSP's offices in the Royal Liver Building.

RMSP was also planning a fast ocean liner service with new ships between Britain and the River Plate. Until enough of its new ships were delivered, RMSP chartered Vauban to help to inaugurate the route between Southampton and Buenos Aires. This left Lamport and Holt with too few ships to offer the service frequency it had planned from Liverpool.

In 1913 RMSP returned Vauban to Lamport and Holt, having successfully forced the smaller company out of the route. Lamport and Holt then transferred Vandyck, Vauban and Vestris to strengthen its service between New York and the River Plate via Barbados and Trinidad, where they became the largest, quickest and most luxurious ships on the route.

On 16 January 1913 Veronese was heading from Liverpool to Buenos Aires with 144 passengers and 77 crew when she struck rocks off Leça da Palmeira in Portugal in heavy sea and thick fog. The weather was so adverse that the rescue of survivors took 48 hours. Eventually a breeches buoy was secured. More than 200 passengers and crew were rescued. One source states that 27 people were killed, but another source puts the death toll at 38.

== First World War ==
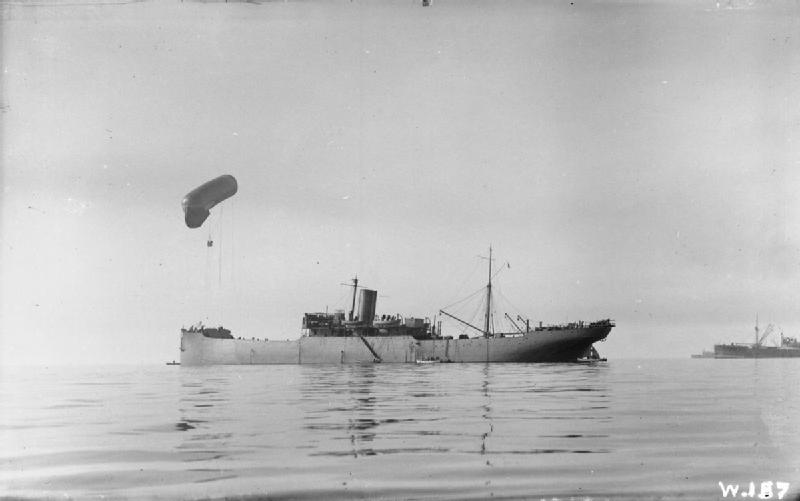
HMS Canning, built as a Lamport and Holt cargo ship in 1896 and requisitioned as a balloon ship in 1914

When the First World War began in July 1914 Lamport and Holt had a fleet of 36 steamships totalling 198,992 GRT. By the time of the Armistice of 11 November 1918 it had lost 11 ships including three V-class liners.

Lamport and Holt's modern R-class ships, having been built to carry livestock on the hoof from South America, were chartered to carry horses and mules from North America to France. Other Lamport and Holt ships carried horses, vehicles, troops, military mail and other war materials. The Admiralty requisitioned the 5,366 GRT cargo steamship Canning and used her throughout the war as the observation balloon ship HMS Canning.

Between 1915 and 1917 Lamport and Holt took delivery of six new refrigerated cargo ships to carry frozen meat. They were large for their time, each being more than 7,000 GRT. All six had names beginning with "M". Only three were sisters, but all six became called the "M-class".

To mitigate war losses Lamport and Holt took delivery of two new sister ships from the shipbuilder Archibald McMillan and Son of Dumbarton: the 4,659 GRT Swinburne completed in September 1917 and 4,665 GRT Sheridan completed in January 1918.

In December 1917 Lamport and Holt took over the Nicholas Mihanovich fleet, which operated passenger services on the River Plate and to Asunción and tugs at Buenos Aires and La Plata.

=== Ships lost or damaged ===
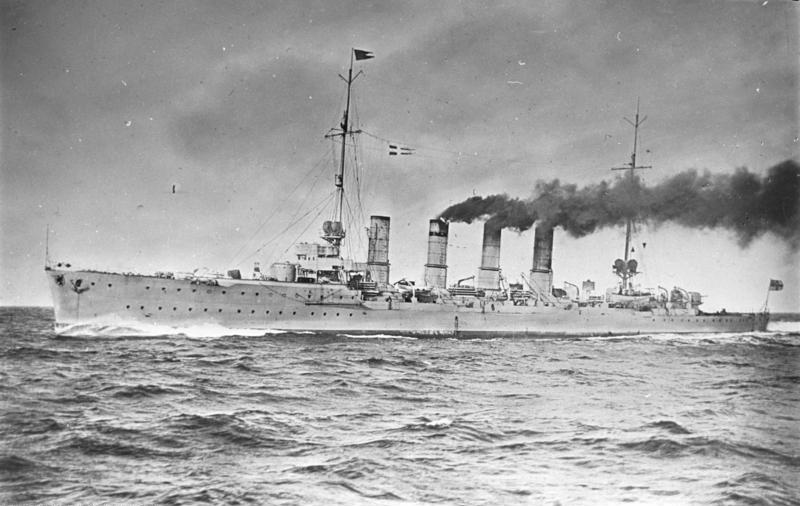
The German cruiser Karlsruhe, which in October 1914 intercepted and sank Cervantes and Vandyck

At the outbreak of war the German light cruiser SMS Karlsruhe was in the Caribbean. On 8 October she intercepted Lamport and Holt's 4,635 GRT cargo ship Cervantes about 100 nautical miles (190 km) southwest of St Paul's Rocks, removed the crew and scuttled the cargo ship.

On 26 October 1914 Vandyck was about 690 nautical miles (1,280 km) west of St Paul's Rocks with 200 passengers and a cargo that included about 1,000 tons of frozen meat when Karlsruhe intercepted her. The cruiser transferred Vandyck's passengers and crew to the steamship Ascuncion, took much of Vandyck's cargo and on 27 October scuttled Vandyck. Lamport and Holt continued to run its New York – River Plate service, but at reduced frequency.

Lamport and Holt survived 1915 without loss. On 9 February 1916 the German merchant raider Möwe intercepted and sank the company's 3,335 GRT cargo ship Horace about 600 nautical miles (1,100 km) northeast of Pernambuco. On 2 December 1916 Möwe intercepted and sank the V-class liner Voltaire about 650 nautical miles (1,200 km) west of Fastnet Rock in the Western Approaches. Both ships were captured and scuttled without loss of life.

On 17 December 1916 SM U-70 torpedoed the 5,587 GRT cargo ship Pascal 12 nautical miles (22 km) north of the Casquets in the English Channel, sinking her and killing two of her crew. The submarine captured Pascal's Master, who was interned in Germany for the remainder of the war.

On 6 April 1916 SM U-39 shelled the 5,394 GRT cargo ship Colbert in the Mediterranean west of Sardinia, damaging the ship and killing two crewmen. Colbert was a French-registered cargo steamship in which Lamport and Holt held a 49 per cent share. Just over a year later, on 30 April 1917, SM UC-37 torpedoed and sank Colbert in the Mediterranean about 15 nautical miles (28 km) northeast of Cape Rose on the coast of Algeria. She sank in only five minutes, killing 51 people aboard.

On 28 April 1917 SM U-81 torpedoed and sank the 4,309 GRT cargo ship Terence about 150 nautical miles (280 km) northwest by north of Fastnet, killing one crewman.

On 22 August 1917 SM U-53 torpedoed and sank the V-class liner Verdi in the Western Approaches about 115 nautical miles (213 km) northwest by north off Eagle Island, County Mayo, killing six of her crew.

On 26 August 1917 the Austro-Hungarian submarine SM U-14 sank the 4,170 GRT Titian in the Mediterranean about 170 nautical miles (310 km) southeast of Malta, fortunately without loss of life. Titian was a sister of Terence which had been sunk only four months previously. U-14's commander was KKpt Georg von Trapp.

On 3 October 1917 the 7,307 GRT M-class refrigerated ship Memling was damaged by a torpedo in the North Atlantic off Brest, France. With help Memling reached port, but she was written off as a constructive total loss and scrapped.

On 24 December 1917 SM U-105 torpedoed and sank the 4,637 GRT cargo ship Canova in the Western Approaches about 15 nautical miles (28 km) south of Mine Head, County Waterford, killing seven crewmen.

On 6 January 1918 SM U-61 torpedoed and sank the 4,186 GRT cargo ship Spenser in St George's Channel about 35 nautical miles (65 km) northeast of Tuskar Rock, Ireland.

On 27 February 1918 SM U-61 torpedoed the 7,402 GRT M-class refrigerated ship Marconi in the Mediterranean off Málaga, killing two crewmen. Marconi remained afloat, reached port and was repaired.

On 28 March 1918 the 5,839 GRT cargo ship Dryden struck a mine in the River Mersey. She managed to reach port and was repaired.

== Between the World Wars ==
Lamport and Holt replaced First World War losses mostly by buying war standard merchant ships that had been ordered by the UK Shipping Controller. The Type B war standard was a 5,030 GRT two-deck dry cargo steamship. In 1919–20 Lamport and Holt bought nine of them, renamed each of them with a name beginning with "B", and they became the "B-class". The Type N war standard was a 6,500 GRT dry cargo steamship of fabricated construction. In 1919 Lamport and Holt bought two that Harland and Wolff had been building for the Shipping Controller, and had them completed to L&H's own specification as Nasmyth and Newton.

Lamport and Holt also ordered ships built entirely to its specification, starting with the 7,327 GRT steamship Laplace from A McMillan launched in 1919 and 7,453 GRT Laplace from D&W Henderson launched in 1920. A McMillan followed these with Lamport and Holt's first motor ships, the 7,412 GRT Leighton and 7,424 GRT Linnell launched in 1921 and 7,417 GRT Lassell launched in 1922. Together these two steamships and three motor ships formed the "L-class", each of which had berths for 12 passengers. D&W Henderson also supplied a larger ship, the 8,190 GRT Hogarth, launched in 1921.

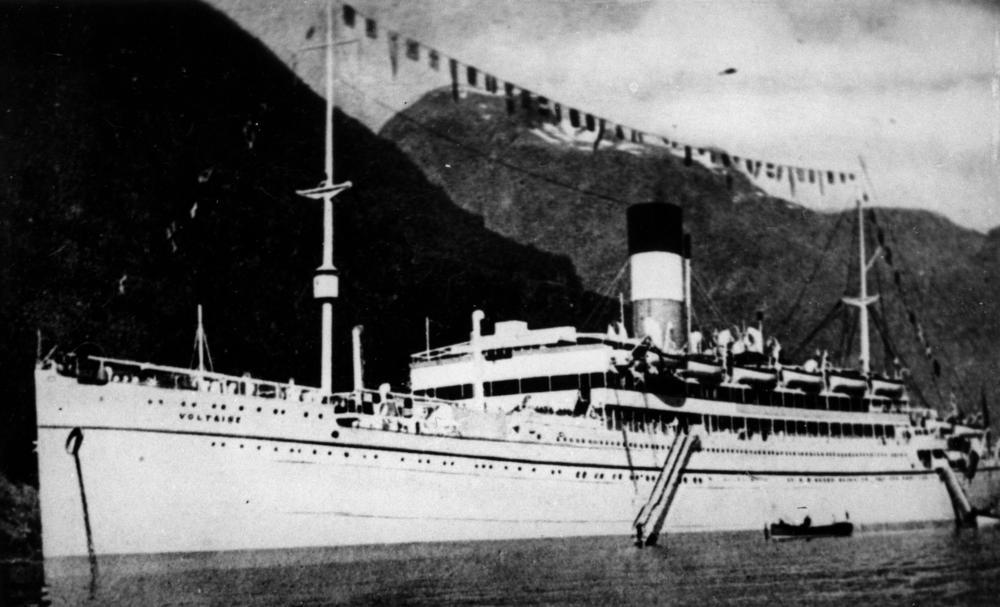
The second Voltaire, completed in 1923, in her 1930s cruising livery

In the war the V-class liners Vandyck, Voltaire and Verdi had all been sunk. Vandyck and Voltaire had each been more than 10,000 GRT, but Lamport and Holt decided that their replacements should be considerably larger. Accordingly, Workman, Clark & Co launched a new 13,233 GRT Vandyck in 1921 and her sister, the new 13,243 GRT Voltaire, in 1923.

Vandyck was Lamport and Holt's first steam turbine ship. She had four turbines, which drove her twin screws by double reduction gearing, giving her a speed of 14 1/2 knots (27 km/h). However, for the new Voltaire two years later Lamport and Holt reverted to a pair of quadruple-expansion engines, one driving each of her twin screws. This gave Voltaire the same speed as her turbine-powered sister.

By 1924 Lamport and Holt's fleet had increased to 50 ships with a combined tonnage of 322,857 GRT.

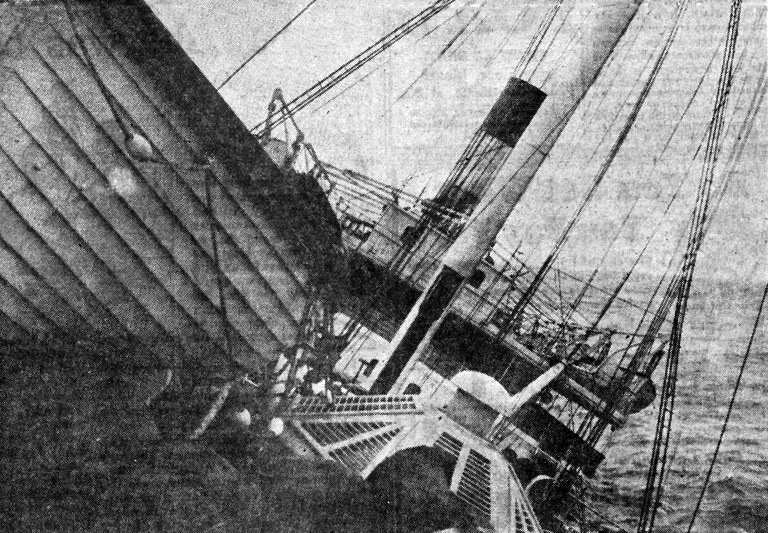
Vestris listing to starboard with part of her upper deck awash before she sank in 1928

On 12 November 1928 Vestris foundered in a heavy sea in the North Atlantic about 300 miles off Hampton Roads with the loss of at least 110 lives. Both the sinking and the loss of life were attributed to Lamport and Holt's negligence. The adverse publicity led the company to withdraw its New York – River Plate passenger service. Its ocean liners returned to Britain and were laid up: Vauban and Vandyck at Southampton and Voltaire on the River Blackwater, Essex.

The Great Depression that began in 1929 caused a global slump in shipping. Lamport and Holt's parent company RMSP ran into financial trouble and in 1930 the UK Government investigated its affairs. In 1931 RMSP's chairman, Lord Kylsant, was tried in the Royal Mail Case for misrepresenting the state of the company and was jailed. In 1932 the group was reconstituted as a new company, Royal Mail Lines under a new chairman. In 1934 Lamport and Holt was restructured. The LB&RP Steam Navigation Co took over all the assets of Lamport and Holt, and the new company was called Lamport and Holt Line Ltd.

In 1930 Lamport and Holt owned 41 ships. As the slump deepened the company laid up many of its cargo ships as well as its passenger liners. Between 1930 and 1935 Lamport and Holt sold almost half of its fleet. In 1932 the liners Vandyck and Voltaire returned to service as cruise ships. This proved successful, so the pair were refitted for their new purpose and their hulls were repainted in white. From then until 1939 they offered holiday cruises to the Mediterranean, West Africa, islands in the Atlantic, the Caribbean, Norway and the Baltic.

Slowly global trade recovered until Lamport and Holt felt able to add new cargo ships. In 1937 Harland and Wolff completed the 6,065 GRT motor ship Delius. It was Lamport and Holt's first new ship since Voltaire in 1923: a gap of 14 years. Delius was joined by her 6,054 GRT sisters Delane and Devis in 1938. Each of these "D-class" ships had berths for 12 passengers. They were of strikingly modern appearance, with clean lines and a single large funnel amidships partly incorporated into the superstructure. In 1940 Harland and Wolff delivered two more D-class ships: 6,244 GRT Debrett and 6,245 GRT Defoe.

== Second World War ==
When the Second World War began in September 1939 Lamport and Holt had a fleet of 16 steamships and five motorships with a combined tonnage of 141,003 GRT. By the time Japan capitulated in 1945 the company had lost 14 of its fleet, including its last two V-class liners.

After the Sudetenland crisis of September 1938 and German occupation of Bohemia and Moravia in March 1939 the UK increased its preparations for war. Early in the 1939 season Vandyck and Voltaire ceased holiday cruising and were converted into troopships.

Voltaire sailed for Bombay in June 1939 and docked in Southampton on 28 August. In October Swan Hunter and Wigham Richardson in Wallsend started to convert her into an armed merchant cruiser. In January 1940 she was commissioned as HMS Voltaire. She served in the Mediterranean until France capitulated in June 1940, after which she became a convoy escort in the North Atlantic, and was sunk in April 1941 by the Thor.

During the war Lamport and Holt's managing director, Francis Lowe, designed and developed a lifeboat with improved buoyancy and more shelter for its occupants. The "Lowe Life-Boat" was designed to carry 55 people but on 27 January 1944 the Evening Express reported that one had remained afloat during a shipwreck despite carrying 84 men. The newspaper stated that Lowe experimented with his design for three years until it was ready to be tested by the Ministry of War Transport.

In 1944 the Vestey Group, parent company of Blue Star Line, took over Lamport and Holt.

To mitigate war losses Harland and Wolff built two more D-class motor ships, which were given the same names as the two that had been sunk. The second Devis was 8,187 GRT and was launched in 1944. The second Defoe, built to a slightly revised design, was 8,462 GRT and was launched in 1945.

=== Ships lost or damaged ===
Vandyck was converted into the armed boarding vessel HMS Vandyck. On the final day of the Franco-British Norwegian campaign, 10 June 1940, German dive bombers bombed and sank her off Andenes in northern Norway, killing two officers and five men. The remainder of her crew reached the shore and was captured.

On 7 July 1940 in the South Atlantic off Ascension Island the German auxiliary cruiser Thor captured and scuttled Delambre, a Japanese-built 7,032 GRT cargo steamship that Lamport and Holt had bought in 1919.

On 15 October 1940 German submarine U-138 torpedoed and sank the 5,327 GRT B-class cargo steamship Bonheur in the Western Approaches about 38 nautical miles (70 km) northwest of the Butt of Lewis.

On 26 February 1941 a German Focke-Wulf Fw 200 Condor aircraft bombed and sank Swinburne in home waters.

On 9 April 1941 the Thor attacked Voltaire about 900 nautical miles (1,700 km) west of Cape Verde. Voltaire returned fire but was outgunned, caught fire and sank. One source states that 81 of her crew were lost; another puts the death toll at 100.

On 30 April 1941 U-107 torpedoed and sank the motor ship Lassell about 300 nautical miles (560 km) southwest of Cape Verde, killing two of her crew. 25 of the survivors were rescued by the Ben Line cargo ship Benvrackie, but 15 of them were killed on 13 May when that ship was also sunk.

On 9 June 1941 U-46 torpedoed and shelled the 5,623 GRT cargo steamship Phidias in the mid-Atlantic, sinking her and killing her master and seven other crew.

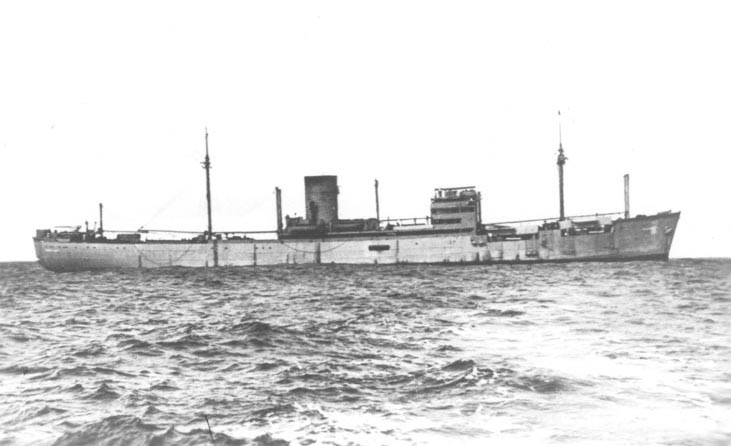
The German raider Atlantis, which in June 1941 sank Balzac

On 22 June 1941 the German auxiliary cruiser Atlantis attacked the 5,372 GRT B-class cargo steamship Balzac in the Atlantic northeast of Para. Despite being heavily outgunned and several knots slower than the raider, Balzac returned fire and zig-zagged to evade German shells. Atlantis fired 190 rounds, only four of which hit Balzac. But eventually the raider overtook and sank her. One source states that three members of Balzac's crew were killed. Another puts the death toll at four.

On 31 January 1942 U-98 torpedoed and sank the 5,623 GRT B-class cargo steamship Biela in the North Atlantic about 400 nautical miles (740 km) southwest of Cape Race, Newfoundland. U-98 saw survivors abandon ship in lifeboats and rafts, but after the U-boat left the area they were never seen again. All hands were lost: a crew of 49 or 50 men.

On 24 June 1942 about 700 nautical miles (1,300 km) southeast of Bermuda, U-156 shelled the 4,857 GRT cargo steamship Willimantic, which Lamport and Holt was managing for the Ministry of War Transport. The steamship caught fire and was abandoned. Six of her complement were killed, another was wounded and her Master was captured.

On 23 September 1942 the 5,335 GRT B-class cargo steamship Bruyère was approaching Freetown in Sierra Leone when U-125 torpedoed and sank her, fortunately without loss of life.

Lamport and Holt's next loss was not to enemy action. On 24 September 1942 the D-class cargo motor ship Defoe was in the North Atlantic southwest of Rockall, en route from Manchester in England to Famagusta in Cyprus laden with chlorine in drums and aeroplane varnish, when she suffered an explosion. Her bow forward of her foremast was blown off and fire broke out. Six of her crew were killed and the remainder abandoned ship. Defoe drifted for at least two days before sinking.

On 29 October 1942 the L-class cargo steamship Laplace was about 350 nautical miles (650 km) south-southeast of Cape Agulhas, South Africa when U-159 torpedoed and sank her. All 61 members of her complement survived.

On 12 November 1942 the 5,332 GRT B-class cargo steamship Browning was laden with munitions, tanks and other materiél for the Allied invasion of French North Africa when U-593 torpedoed and sank her off Oran on the coast of Algeria. One member of her crew, her deck boy, was killed.

The D-class motor ship Devis was modified as an assault command ship. On 5 July 1943 she was the commodore ship in Convoy KMS 18B for the Allied invasion of Sicily. She was carrying a rear-admiral, 289 Canadian troops and two landing craft. That afternoon U-593 torpedoed and sank her northeast of Cape Bengut on the coast of Algeria, killing 52 of the personnel aboard.

On 21 November 1943 the D-class motor ship Delius in the Western Approaches about 300 nautical miles (560 km) southwest of Land's End when an enemy aircraft attacked her with a glide bomb. The bomb did not sink her but it killed her Master and three of her crew and wounded several other crewmen.

== Polish and Belgian passenger ships ==
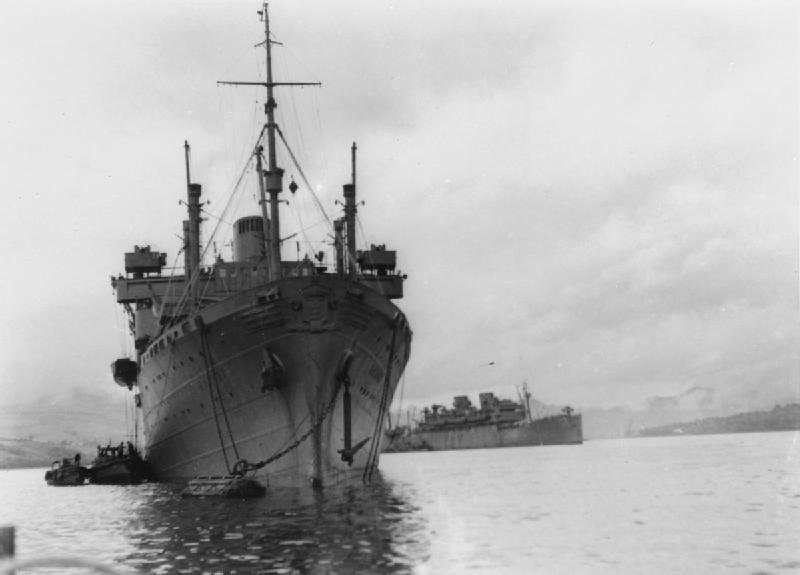
The Polish liner Batory (left) as a troop ship in the Second World War, with another troop ship in the background (centre right)

After the German and Soviet Invasion of Poland the UK Ministry of War Transport put three Gdynia–America Line passenger liners under Lamport and Holt management. The 6,345 GRT Pułaski, 6,852 GRT Kościuszko and 14,287 GRT motor ship Batory became troop ships. They retained their Polish officers and crew but each carried a Lamport and Holt liaison officer.

In 1946, the MoWT returned Batory to Poland, which by then was under Soviet occupation. But the crews of Pułaski and Kościuszko refused to be repatriated. The MoWT re-registered the ships in the UK as Empire Penryn and Empire Helford respectively, the Polish crews signed UK articles and the ships were sold to Lamport and Holt.

In 1940, the MoWT put a pair of Compagnie Maritime Belge passenger liners under Lamport and Holt management. The 8,851 GRT sister ships Elisabethville and Thysville became troop ships. In 1947 they were renamed Empire Bure and Empire Test respectively.

== After the Second World War ==
By the end of the war in 1945 Lamport and Holt owned nine cargo ships with a total tonnage of 65,396 GRT. On behalf of the MoWT it was managing several cargo ships and four passenger ships. The company increased its fleet by buying Empire ships of various ages and sizes from the MoWT. The largest of these was the 9,942 GRT Empire Haig, which Lamport and Holt renamed Dryden. In 1947 the company bought one Liberty ship, the 7,256 GRT John J.McGraw, which it renamed Lassell. In the same year it chartered two Victory ships from the Panama Shipping Corporation. They were the 7,602 GRT Atlantic City Victory, which was renamed Vianna, and the 7,607 GRT El Reno Victory, which was renamed Vilar.

Some ships were also transferred between Lamport and Holt and other Vestey Group subsidiaries, and renamed according to the naming policy of each company. This practice was to continue throughout Lamport and Holt's decades as a member of the Vestey Group. In 1946 the group took over Alfred Booth and Company, which increased the scope for fleet transfers between subsidiaries.

Not until 1952 did Lamport and Holt resume adding ships to its fleet newly built to its own specification. These were two motor ships, the 4,459 GRT Siddons and 8,311 GRT Raeburn, plus the 8,237 GRT steamship Romney, which became the company flagship. They were joined in 1953 by the 7,971 GRT motor ship Raphael, which had a top speed of 17 1/2 knots (32 km/h). In 1953 the fleet was back up to 16 ships and had a combined tonnage of 105,970 GRT. A sister ship for Raphael, the 7,840 GRT Ronsard, was built in 1957.

Lamport and Holt continued to buy second-hand ships. They included the 3,022 GRT refrigerated cargo motor ship Mosdale in 1954, which Lamport and Holt renamed Balzac and used almost entirely to ship bananas from Santos in Brazil to mainland Europe or for Geest from the island of Dominica to Britain. Its success led the company to have two new refrigerated ships built: the 3,099 GRT Constable in 1959 and 3,005 GRT Chatham in 1960.

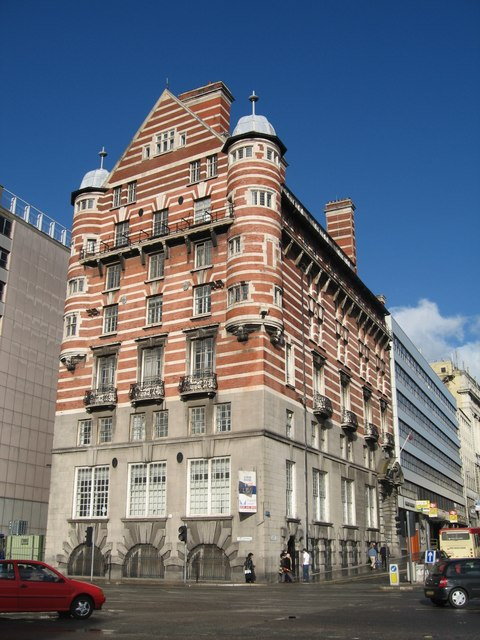
Albion House in Liverpool, where Lamport and Holt was headquartered from 1975 until the 1980s

In 1967 Booth Line took over Lamport and Holt's services to New York, ending a trade in which Lamport and Holt had been engaged for more or less a century. In 1974 Vestey Group moved Lamport and Holt's head office from the Royal Liver Building to Albion House, Liverpool. By 1977 Lamport and Holt's fleet was reduced to four ships.

== Containerisation ==
Modern intermodal containers for freight were developed in the 1950s and standardised by ISO standards from the end of the 1960s. They were rapidly transforming cargo shipping. Lamport and Holt's traditional break-bulk cargo ships were not equipped to carry containers, but the company believed that it would be some time before all ports in South America would be adapted to handle them.

Since 1967 Austin & Pickersgill had been mass-producing a standardised motor ship, the SD14, in Sunderland on the River Wear. The SD14 was designed as a shelter deck break-bulk cargo ship to replace Liberty ships and Victory ships. Subsequently, A&P adapted the design to carry 118 20-foot containers on deck and on the hatch covers as well as break-bulk cargo in the holds.

Accordingly, in the late 1970s Lamport and Holt ordered four SD14s of 9,324 GRT and 15,265 DWT from A&P. They were launched as Bronte. Browning and Boswell in 1979 and Belloc in 1980. They formed a new "B-class", and Lamport and Holt rapidly sold its existing fleet as they were delivered. Unlike previous Lamport and Holt ships, the new B-class had no passenger berths at all. Their introduction brought the company's passenger service to an end after 135 years.

Lamport and Holt operated a joint service between the British Isles and South America with its sister company Blue Star Line and with two Furness, Withy & Co subsidiaries: Houlder Brothers and Royal Mail Lines. Between them the four companies traded as the Joint British Line or as BHLR.

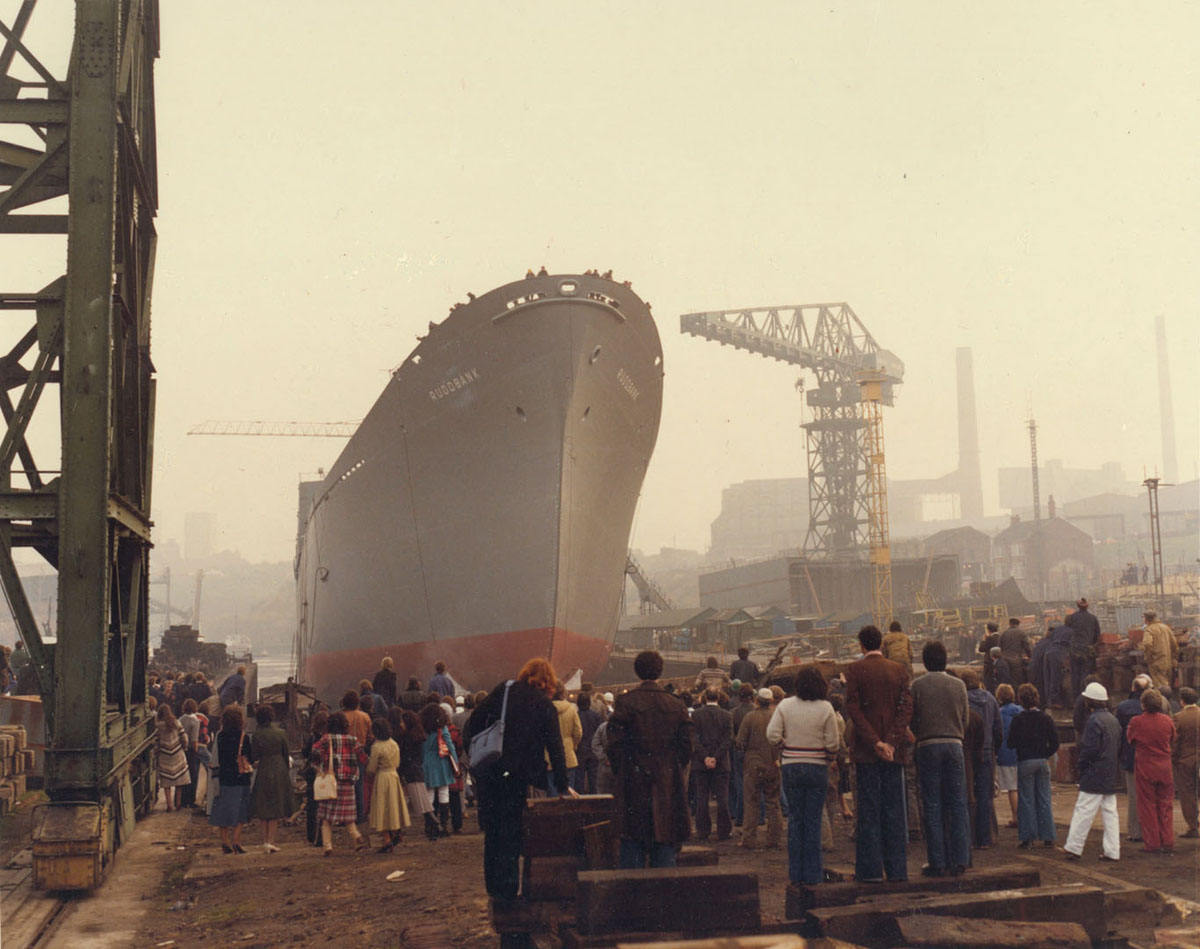
Ruddbank being launched in Sunderland for Bank Line in 1978. In 1983 Lamport and Holt bought her and renamed her Romney.

In 1982 the Falklands War and its aftermath rapidly increased demand for container ships to operate between Britain and the South Atlantic. In 1983 Lamport and Holt bought the 12,214 GRT motor ship Ruddbank from Bank Line and renamed her Romney. She took government cargo outward from Britain to the Falkland Islands and commercial cargo homeward from Brazil to Europe. Lamport and Holt sold her in 1986 after the UK government completed building RAF Mount Pleasant.

In the 1980s BHLR became British South America Lines or Brisa. Its headquarters was moved to London and its service was reorganised with a smaller number of larger ships. Accordingly, Lamport and Holt sold its SD14s between 1981 and 1983, and in 1986 took a share in Blue Star Line's 1979 container ship New Zealand Star. She was rebuilt in Singapore with a mid-section of greater beam, which increased her capacity from 721 containers to 1,143. Berths were added for 12 passengers. In total the rebuild increased her tonnage from 17,082 GRT to 22,635 GRT. She was repainted in Lamport and Holt colours and in a ceremony on 12 May 1986 Lady Soames, the youngest daughter of Winston Churchill, formally renamed her Churchill.

== Demise ==
In 1990 Oetker Group took over Furness, Withy and decided to withdraw Houlder Brothers and Royal Mail Lines from the Brisa partnership. Vestey Group decided to continue its remaining trade with South America solely under the Blue Star name. When Brisa Line ceased trading at the end of June 1991 Churchill reverted to Blue Star Line under the new name Argentina Star, and Lamport and Holt ceased trading.

== Bibliography ==
- Dunn, Laurence (1973). Merchant Ships of the World in Colour 1910–1929. London: Blandford Press Ltd. pp. 110–111. ISBN 0-7137-0569-8.
- Harnack, Edwin P (1938) [1903]. All About Ships & Shipping (7th ed.). London: Faber and Faber.
- Heaton, Paul M (2004). Lamport & Holt Line. Abergavenny: PM Heaton Publishing. ISBN 1-872006-16-7.
- Talbot-Booth, EC (1936). Ships and the Sea (Third ed.). London: Sampson Low, Marston & Co Ltd.
- Tomán, René De La Pedraja (1998). Oil and Coffee: Latin American Merchant Shipping from the Imperial Era to the 1950s. Santa Barbara: Greenwood Publishing Group. pp. 6–9. ISBN 978-0-31330-839-0.
