= SS Vandyck (1911) =

History

United Kingdom
- Name: Vandyck
- Namesake: Anthony van Dyck (1599–1641)
- Owner: Liverpool, Brazil & River Plate SN Co
- Operator: Lamport and Holt
- Port of registry: Liverpool
- Route: New York – Buenos Aires
- Builder: Workman, Clark & Co, Belfast
- Yard number: 301
- Launched: 1 June 1911
- Completed: 8 September 1911
- Identification: UK official number 131378; Code letters HTKF; Call sign MJY
- Fate: Sunk by enemy action 26 October 1914

General characteristics
- Tonnage: 10,237 GRT or 10,327 GRT
- Length: 495 ft 6 in (151.03 m) registered; 511 feet (156 m) overall
- Beam: 60.8 ft (18.5 m)
- Depth: 28.7 ft (8.7 m)
- Installed power: 614 NHP, 8,000 ihp
- Propulsion: 2 × 4-cylinder quadruple-expansion engines, twin screw
- Speed: 15 knots (28 km/h)
- Notes: sister ships: Vauban, Vestris

SS Vandyck was a 1911 steam ocean liner operated by Lamport and Holt Line and used on its service between New York and the River Plate. The German cruiser Karlsruhe sank her in 1914.

Vandyck was named after the Flemish Baroque painter Anthony van Dyck (1599–1641). She was the second of three Lamport and Holt ships to bear the name. The first was an 1867 steamship that Lamport and Holt bought and renamed Vandyck in 1873. The third and last was a steam ocean liner built for Lamport and Holt in 1921, converted into an armed boarding vessel in World War II and sunk by enemy action in 1940.

== Building ==
Vandyck was the first of three sister ships that Workman, Clark and Company of Belfast built for Lamport and Holt in 1911–13. Her yard number was 301. Vandyck was launched in 1911, Vauban in January 1912 and Vestris in May 1912. The trio were similar in size to Vasari that Sir Raylton Dixon & Co built for Lamport and Holt in 1909. Vauban and Vestris had passenger accommodation slightly larger than that of Vandyck. Since 1906 Lamport and Holt policy was to name its passenger liners after artists and engineers beginning with "V". Together they became known as "V-class ships".

Workman, Clark launched Vandyck on 1 June 1911 and completed her on 8 September. She was 10,237 GRT or 10,327 GRT. Her registered length was 495.5 ft (151.0 m), she was 511 ft (156 m) long overall and had a 60.8 ft (18.5 m) beam. Her twin screws were driven by a pair of four-cylinder quadruple-expansion engines. Between them the engines developed 614 NHP or 8,000 ihp and gave her a top speed of 15 knots (28 km/h). Decorative plaster work in the public rooms was carried out by H.H. Martyn & Co..

Lamport and Holt registered Vandyck in Liverpool. Her UK official number was 131378 and her code letters were HTKF.

== Service history ==
Vandyck, Vauban and Vestris were intended for Lamport and Holt's service between Liverpool and Buenos Aires via Vigo and Leixões and Lisbon. But in 1911 the Royal Mail Steam Packet Company had taken over Lamport and Holt. RMSP chartered Vauban for a new and quicker service between Southampton and the River Plate. For this Vauban was briefly renamed Alcala and repainted in RMSP colours. By the end of 1913 RMSP had returned Vauban to Lamport and Holt and restored her to her original name and colours. However, RMSP effectively forced L&H out of the route between Britain and the River Plate. Lamport and Holt then transferred Vandyck, Vauban and Vestris to strengthen its service between New York and the River Plate via Barbados and Trinidad, where they became the largest and most luxurious ships on the route.

By 1914 Vandyck was equipped for wireless telegraphy, operating on the 300 and 600 metre wavelengths. Her call sign was MJY.

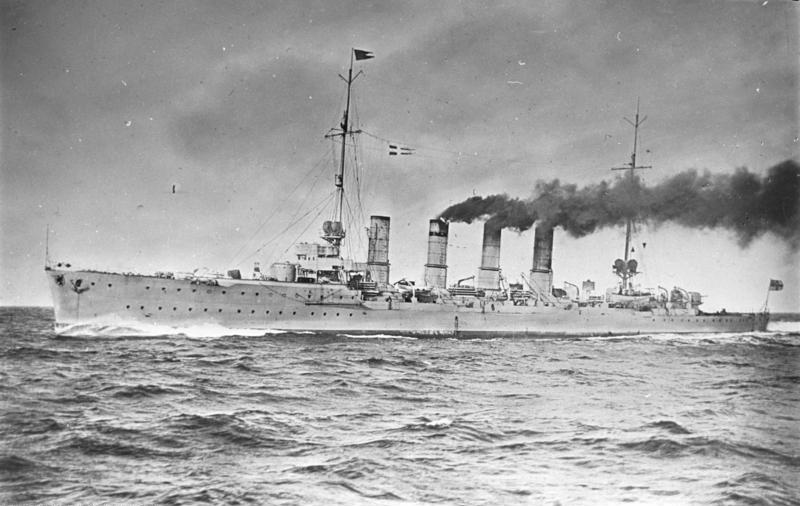
The German cruiser Karlsruhe, which intercepted and sank Vandyck

In July 1914 World War I began, and on 26 October that year the German cruiser SMS Karlsruhe intercepted Vandyck about 690 miles west by south of St Paul's Rocks. Vandyck was en route from Buenos Aires to New York carrying more than 200 passengers, most of whom were US citizens, and a cargo including more than 1,000 tons of frozen meat. Karlsruhe's crew transferred Vandyck's passengers and crew to the steamship Ascuncion, which took them to Pará in Brazil, where they landed on 1 November. Karlsruhe also took much of Vandyck's cargo, particularly the frozen meat. On 27 October Karlsruhe's crew sank Vandyck off the Brazilian state of Maranhão.

== Bibliography ==
- Dunn, Laurence (1973). Merchant Ships of the World in Colour 1910–1929. London: Blandford Press Ltd. ISBN 0-7137-0569-8.
- Heaton, Paul M (2004). Lamport & Holt Line. Abergavenny: PM Heaton Publishing. ISBN 1-872006-16-7.
- The Marconi Press Agency Ltd (1914). The Year Book of Wireless Telegraphy and Telephony. London: The Marconi Press Agency Ltd.
