= Saverys family =

Belgian shipping family

The Saverys family is one of the oldest shipping related families in Belgium. It controls the CMB group, Bocimar, Delphis, ASL Aviation, Euronav and Exmar companies. The combined wealth of the Saverys family is $951 Million dollars.

== First Generation ==
The Saverys family started in shipping during the time of Bernard Boel (1798–1872), a carpenter from the Antwerpen South shipyard, who founded the Boel shipyard at Temse on the Schelde river. They worked closely with the Cigrang family (the current owners of Cobelfret group) and together formed a dry cargo tramping company called Bocimar (BOel, CIgrang, MARitime). Philippe Saverys (Felix's son) would later marry the grand daughter of Bernard Boel.

=== Felix Saverys ===
Felix Saverys (1866–1909) was born in 1866. He married Marie-Louise Auwers (1904–1988)

== Second Generation ==
Philippe Saverys, Marie-Paule Saverys, Jean Saverys, Anne-Marie Saverys, Jacques Saverys, Béatrice Saverys, Claire Saverys and François Saverys.

Philippe married Jeanne Van Damme. The couple had 3 children Marc, Nicolas and Virgine (see below).

Jacques married Françoise (Bichon) Donck and had four children - Félix Saverys, Céline Saverys, Martin Saverys and Géraldine Saverys

=== Philippe Saverys ===
Philippe Saverys (1931–2002) married Jeanne Van Damme (the daughter of Georges Van Damme - a descendant of the Boel brothers who owned several shipyards in Belgium). Jeanne was the granddaughter of Bernard Boel (the founder of Temse Boelwerf shipyard. The Boelwerf went bankrupt in 1992 and closed down). The couple had three children: Marc, Nicolas and Virginie. Philippe continued to invest in ship owning companies and shipyards, utilizing subsidies given by government at that time.

== Third Generation ==
The third generation of the Saverys family consists of Marc, Nicolas and Virginie Saverys. Marc and Nicolas married sisters Catherine and Mary Patricia Verbeke.

=== Marc Saverys ===
Marc Saverys (born 1954) graduated in law from the University of Ghent in 1976. After finishing his studies, he first joined the chartering department of Bocimar, CMB group's dry bulk division. In 1985, he set up the dry bulk division of Exmar, another shipping company. After the change of control of Exmar in 1991, he became managing director of CMB, a position which he still holds. He is chairman of the board of the major oil tanker operator Euronav since it was incorporated in 2003. He is also chairman of Delphis.

Marc is the chairman of Euronav and Delphis, holds a controlling stake in the CMB group, Durabilis (a company involved in the agribusiness in developing countries) and is board member of Sibelco (a Belgian minerals company) and Mediafin (a media group).

=== Nicolas Saverys ===
Nicolas Saverys (born 1958) is the CEO and managing director of Exmar, a fully owned subsidiary of CMB group.

Nicolas joined the family business of shipowning immediately after graduating from the University of Ghent with a degree in economics in 1980. He was instrumental in starting Exmar and developing it into an oil and gas ship owning company. He was the Chairman of the Royal Belgian Shipowners Association for twenty years. He is Chairman of the Flemish Ports Association and the Benelux Committee of Bureau Veritas. Nicolas is Director of NileDutch, a liner container company involved in shipping containers to Africa.

Nicolas was married to Mary Patricia Verbeke. Nicolas lives in Sombeke castle, Waasmunster, Eastern Flanders.

=== Virginie Saverys ===
Virginie Saverys (born 1960) studied law from the University of Paris, from which she graduated in 1983. While in Paris, she also studied translation at the Institut Supérieur d'Interprétation et de Traduction. She started her career first in Bocimar's legal department. In 1985, she left Bocimar to start up the legal department at Exmar. She managed the legal department of the CMB Group from 1991 to 2006.

Virginie is the owner and chairman of the wine estate Avignonesi (Montepulciano, Tuscany). She has been a director of CMB since 1993 and a director of Euronav since 2003.

== Fourth Generation ==
=== Sebastiaan Saverys ===
Sebastiaan Saverys is the Director and CEO of Durabilis, a company involved in sustainable agribusiness in developing countries. He is the founder of Durabilis foundation. He is the son of Marc Saverys.

Sebastiaan is a Mechanical engineer. After graduation, he volunteered with Engineers without frontiers and worked in Ecuador and Guatemala. In 2003, while volunteering with Engineers Without Frontiers in San Juan Del Obispo, a small town in Guatemala, with Evert Wulfrank, he started to help local farmers sell their fruits. Together Sebastiaan and Evert (who is now the Chief Operating Officer of Durabilis) they created an agricultural cooperative COOINCOM. This led to the founding of Durabilis, an agribusiness group working in Guatemala, Burkinia Faso and Peru. In 2009, Sebastiaan met Dr. Raul Urbina in Peru, and together, they launched Stevia One, a research and development firm involved in sustainable production of Stevia (a plant from which non caloric sweeteners are extracted). In 2010, at the Clinton Global Initiative, Duvalis pledged to devote the next five years to help farmers in Sub Saharan Africa.

Sebastiaan lives in Peru.

=== Alexander Saverys ===
Alexander Saverys (born 1978) is the founder and managing director of Delphis, a European Container shipping company. An alumnus of Katholieke Universiteit Leuven and Universidad Complutense de Madrid.

Alexander studied law at the University of Leuven and earned his MBA at the "Fachhochschule für Wirtschaft in Berlin. He then apprenticed at the Spanish ship broker FEM focussing on the container trade. He founded Delphis in 2004. He has three children Felix, Leon and Boris.

=== Pauline Saverys ===
Pauline Saverys (born 1982) is a psychologist and a therapist. She graduated as a Master in Psychology at the KUL (Catholic University of Louvain) in 2006, with an internship in Credit Suisse New York. In 2010 she created Renessence, a non profit organisation that attends to children suffering from eating disorders.

Pauline is the author of a book on eating disorders.

Pauline is a non executive director of Exmar.

=== Ariane Saverys ===
Ariane Saverys (born 1983) graduated with a master's degree in Nautical Sciences at the Maritime Academy of Antwerp in 2007. She started her career at Anglo-Eastern Ship management in Antwerp and Hong-Kong at their operations and HSEQ departments. In 2009 she joined Broere Shipping (now John T. Essberger) and sailed as a third officer on board chemical tankers for a short while. She then joined Exmar Ship management and started a new division named Commercial Cruise Vessels.

Ariane is a non executive director of Exmar
