= Vestris =

Vestris may refer to:

== Performers ==
- Angiolo Vestris (1730–1809), French-Italian ballet dancer and actor
- Auguste Vestris (1760–1842), French dancer, son of Gaétan Vestris
- Auguste Armand Vestris (1788–1825), French dancer, son of Auguste Vestris
- Gaétan Vestris (1729–1808), French-Italian ballet dancer
- Lucia Elizabeth Vestris (Elizabetta Lucia Bartolozzi, 1797–1856), English singer and actress-manager, wife of Auguste Armand Vestris, called Madame Vestris on stage, like her great-aunt-in law.
- Rose Vestris (Françoise-Rose Gourgaud, 1743–1804) French actress, wife of Angiolo Vestris, called Madame Vestris on stage

== Ships ==
- SS Vestris, a British passenger liner that sank on 12 November 1928; 112 of 325 passengers and crew were lost.
