= Port of Antwerp-Bruges =

Belgian port authority

Port of Antwerp-Bruges is the port authority that manages the ports of Antwerp and Bruges (Zeebrugge) since the merger between the port companies of both ports in 2022. It is a limited liability company of public law with the City of Antwerp and the City of Bruges as its shareholders.

The Port of Antwerp-Bruges has made a commitment to environmental sustainability and climate neutrality by 2050. As part of this challenge, the port will be introducing (in partnership with CMB.TECH) the Hydrotug 1, the world's first hydrogen-powered tugboat.
