= USS Willimantic =

Cargo ship of the United States Navy

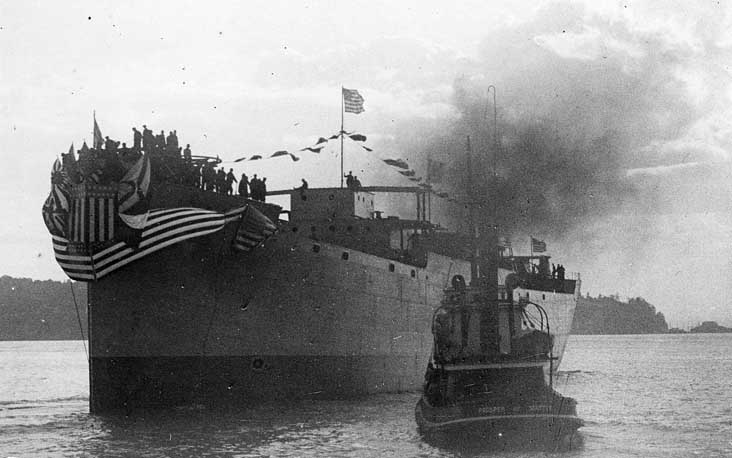
- Willimantic being launched as a merchant cargo ship at the Todd Drydock and Construction Company at Seattle, Washington, on 29 May 1918 with her bow heavily decorated and the tug Prosper, of Seattle, standing by.

History

United States
- Name: USS Willimantic
- Builder: Todd Drydock and Construction Company, Seattle, Washington
- Launched: 29 May 1918
- Completed: October 1918
- Acquired: 2 November 1918
- Commissioned: 2 November 1918
- Decommissioned: 21 April 1919
- Fate: Transferred to US Shipping Board 21 April 1919
- Notes: In US Shipping Board and US Maritime Commission custody 1919–1942.

United Kingdom
- Name: SS Willimantic
- Operator: Lamport and Holt Line for MoWT
- Acquired: early 1942
- Out of service: 24 June 1942
- Fate: Sunk by shellfire, 24 June 1942

General characteristics
- Type: Cargo ship
- Tonnage: 4,857 GRT; 4,437 tonnage under deck; 2,992 NRT
- Displacement: 10,690 long tons (10,862 t) normal
- Length: 396 ft 0 in (120.70 m)
- Beam: 53 ft 0 in (16.15 m) waterline
- Draft: 24 ft (7.3 m) aft
- Decks: 2
- Installed power: 339 NHP
- Propulsion: triple-expansion engine
- Speed: 10.5 knots (19.4 km/h; 12.1 mph)
- Complement: 52 in US Navy service; 38 in UK merchant service
- Sensors & processing systems: Submarine signalling

USS Willimantic (ID-3549) was a cargo steamship. She was built in 1918 and served in United States Navy commission from 1918 to 1919. She was transferred to United Kingdom Ministry of War Transport service in 1942 and sunk by enemy action in June of that year.

== Construction, acquisition, and commissioning ==
The Todd Drydock and Construction Company at Seattle, Washington built Willimantic built in 1918 for the United States Shipping Board. She was launched on 29 May 1918 and completed in October 1918. She was an oil-fired steamship with a 339 NHP three-cylinder triple-expansion engine.

On 2 November 1918 the Shipping Board transferred her to the US Navy at the Puget Sound Navy Yard in Bremerton, Washington, for naval service in World War I. The Navy assigned her the naval registry identification number 3549 and commissioned her the same day as USS Willimantic (ID-3549). The Armistice with Germany ended World War I nine days later on 11 November 1918.

== United States service and decommissioning ==
Assigned to the Naval Overseas Transportation Service, Willimantic completed sea trials, then loaded a cargo of 6,400 tons of flour and put to sea on 14 December 1918. She transited the Panama Canal and arrived at New York City on 9 January 1919. After bunkering, she left New York on 21 January 1919 bound for Gibraltar, where she was to await further orders.

Still carrying her flour, Willimantic arrived at Gibraltar on 7 February 1919, but remained there only briefly because she immediately received orders to get underway for Fiume on the coast of the Adriatic Sea. She reached Fiume on 18 February 1919 and unloaded her flour, which was used to relieve hunger in Eastern Europe in the aftermath of World War I.

After almost a month at Fiume, Willimantic left on 12 March 1919 for Gibraltar loaded only with water for ballast. From Gibraltar she proceeded to the Azores and then to New York City, where she arrived on 13 April 1919.

Willimantic was decommissioned at New York on 21 April 1919. The Navy transferred her back to the US Shipping Board the same day. Once again Willimantic, she remained in the custody of the Shipping Board and its successor, the United States Maritime Commission.

== United Kingdom service and loss ==
Early in 1941 during World War II Willimantic was transferred to the UK MoWT, who placed her under the management of Lamport and Holt Line.The British crew signed on in Baltimore. She sailed on 30 July 1941 for repairs in New York then with cargo to Bassra and Abidjan then to Mozambique and South Africa. Willimantic sailed for Calcutta from Calcutta she sailed for Rangoon with a cargo of coal for the rice mills of Bessian in Burma. She was in Rangoon in early 1942 when the Japanese invaded, she escaped to Calcutta leaving without Charts orders or Pilot. From Calcutta she sailed to Colombo and then to South Africa. Leaving Cape Town May 1942. In the early hours of 24 June 1942 about 700 miles southeast of Bermuda, German submarine U-156 opened fire on Willimantic with her 10.5 cm (4.1 in) deck gun. According to Willimantic's Second Officer, BM Metcalf, a shell blew away Willimantic's radio room and part of her chart room, killing her two radio operators. Then a shell destroyed the 2.5-inch (6.4 cm) DEMS gun on Willimantic's poop.

After further shellfire the cargo ship caught fire amidships and her Master, LE Everett, gave the order to abandon ship. A shell hit the two port lifeboats as they were being lowered, destroying them. The Third Officer and an able seaman were killed and another AB suffered a shrapnel head-wound. In total six members of the ship's complement were killed. Survivors got clear of the ship in the two starboard lifeboats.

U-156's commander, Werner Hartenstein, took Captain Everett prisoner, gave Second Officer Metcalf a chart and left the two surviving lifeboats under the command of Metcalf and the First Officer, M Delaney. Metcalf had his crew rig a sail and set course south-southwest for Antigua, about 800 miles away. Delaney at first headed west and then turned south. U-156 then proceeded to sink Willimantic with further shellfire.

In Metcalf's boat were 16 survivors including two DEMS gunners. After six days they sighted a 6,778 GRT Norwegian motor ship, Tamerlane. Metcalf signalled her with flares and the Norwegian replied by Aldis lamp. Tamerlane rescued the occupants of Metcalf's boat and altered course to search for Delaney's boat, which Metcalf estimated to be about 20 miles north-northeast. But Tamerlane received a warning of enemy submarines in the area, and reluctantly called off the search. Seven days later Tamerlane landed Metcalf's survivors at Rio de Janeiro.

In Delaney's boat were 15 survivors including one DEMS gunner. 12 days after the sinking they reached Saint Martin in the Lesser Antilles.

U-156 landed Captain Everett at Lorient. He spent the rest of the war interned at Marlag und Milag Nord in northern Germany. In total 32 of Willimantic's 38 complement survived.
