= SS Vasari (1908) =

Steam ocean liner

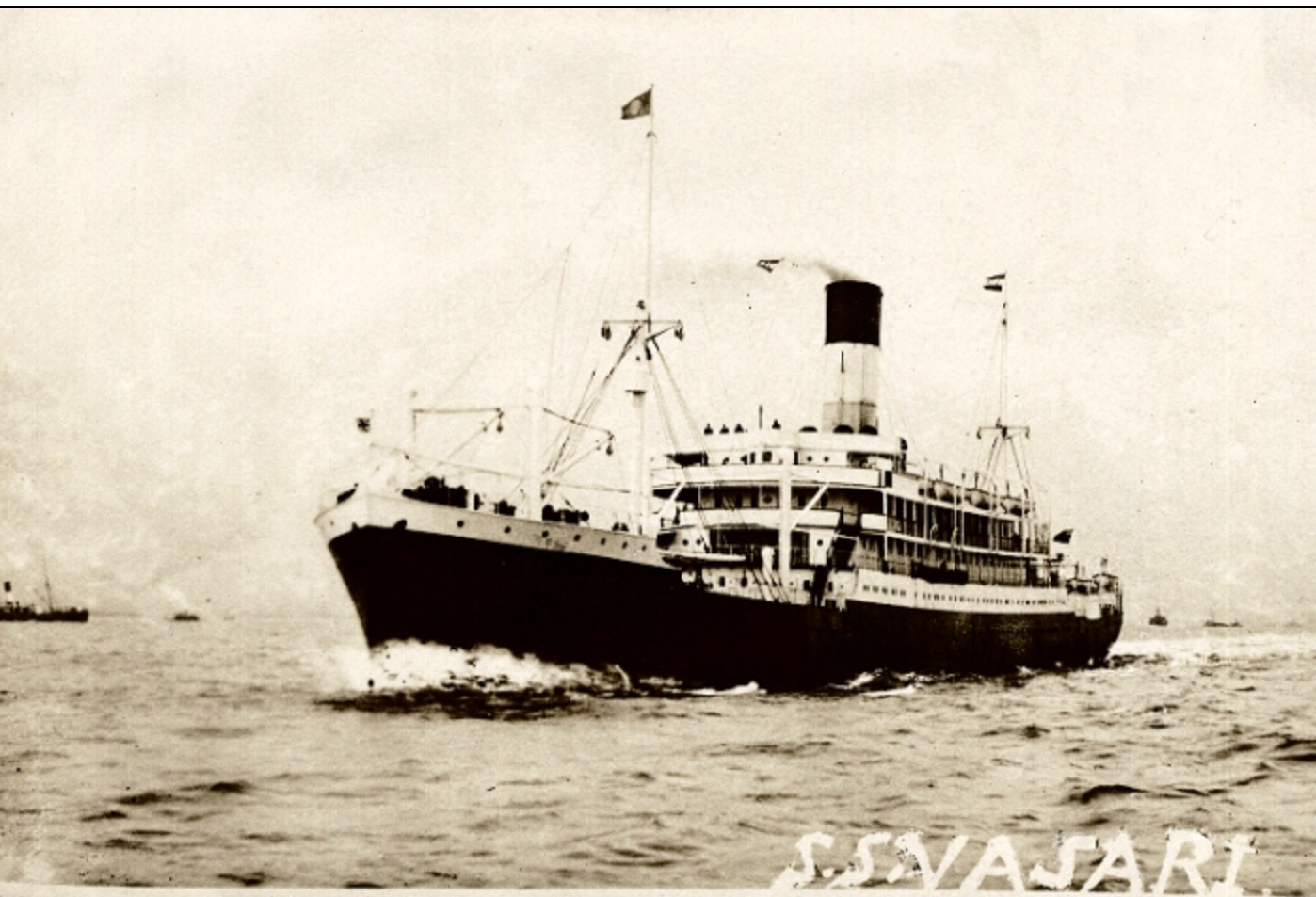
- Vasari under way

History
- Name: Vasari (1908–28); Arctic Queen (1928–35); Pishchevaya Industriya (1935–79)
- Namesake: Giorgio Vasari (1908–28)
- Owner: Liverpool, Brazil and River Plate SN Co (1909–28); Hellyer Bros, Ltd (1928–35); Dal'ryba (1935–79)
- Operator: Lamport and Holt (1909–28); Hellyer Bros, Ltd (1928–35); Dal'ryba (1935–79)
- Port of registry: (United Kingdom) Liverpool (1909–28); (United Kingdom) Hull (1928–35); (Soviet Union) Vladivostok (1935–79)
- Builder: Sir Raylton Dixon & Co Ltd
- Yard number: 539
- Launched: 8 December 1908
- Completed: April 1909
- Identification: UK official number 127974; code letters HNSW (until 1933); call sign UVR (by 1913); call sign GBZL (1930–35); call sign UPNW (1935–79)
- Fate: Scrapped 1979

General characteristics
- Type: ocean liner
- Tonnage: 1909–28: 10,117 GRT, 6,352 NRT; 1928–79: 10,078 GRT, 5,327 NRT
- Length: 486 ft (148 m)
- Beam: 59.3 ft (18.1 m)
- Depth: 27.4 ft (8.4 m)
- Decks: 2
- Installed power: 448 NHP
- Propulsion: 2 × 4-cylinder quadruple-expansion engines, twin screws
- Sensors & processing systems: wireless direction finding (by 1930); echo sounding device (by 1934)

Vasari was a 1908 steam ocean liner that was built in England, operated by the British Lamport and Holt Line and used on its service between New York and the River Plate.

In 1928 she was sold to a Hull deep-sea fishing undertaking who had her rebuilt as the fish factory ship Arctic Queen. In 1935 she was sold to the USSR, who renamed her Pishchevaya Industriya. She survived until 1979, when she was scrapped in Taiwan.

== Building ==
Sir Raylton Dixon & Co Ltd of Middlesbrough built Vasari for Lamport and Holt as yard number 539. She was launched on 8 December 1908 as Vasari, named after the 16th-century Italian painter and architect Giorgio Vasari (1511–74). Since 1906 Lamport and Holt's policy was to name its passenger liners after artists and engineers beginning with "V". Together they became known as "V-class ships".

Vasari was 486 ft (148 m) long and had a beam of 59.3 ft (18.1 m). As built, her tonnages were 10,117 GRT and 6,352 NRT. She was Lamport and Holt's first ship of more than 10,000 GRT. Previous V-class liners had ranged in size from the 7,120 GRT Verdi to the 8,615 GRT Voltaire, both of which were launched in 1907.

Vasari had twin screws, driven by a pair of four-cylinder quadruple-expansion engines built by Richardsons, Westgarth & Co, that between them developed 448 NHP.

== Passenger service ==
Since the 1860s Lamport and Holt had operated a cargo and passenger service between New York and the River Plate via ports in the Caribbean and Brazil. Its ships were predominantly cargo vessels but each carried a few passengers. From 1902 Lamport and Holt had added new ships to the route that had more passenger berths. Until about 1913 Vasari was the largest and most luxurious ship on the route.

By 1913 Vasari was equipped for wireless telegraphy, operating on the 300 and 600 metre wavelengths. Her call sign was UVR.

In the First World War Lamport and Holt lost the V-class liners Vandyck, Verdi and Voltaire to enemy action. On 21 August 1917 a torpedo narrowly missed Vasari on the North Atlantic northwest of Ireland.

To replace the three V-class liners sunk in the Great War, Lamport and Holt ordered two larger and more luxurious new ships. A new 13,233 GRT Vandyck was launched in 1921, and was joined by a new 13,243 GRT Voltaire launched in 1923. By 1928 Vasari was surplus to Lamport and Holt's requirements and was sold.

== Fish factory ship ==
Hellyer Brothers of Hull bought Vasari, had her converted into a fish factory ship to process halibut caught off Greenland and renamed her Arctic Queen. The rebuild changed her tonnages to 10,078 GRT and 5,327 NRT. By 1930 she was equipped with wireless direction finding, and by 1934 she was further equipped with an echo sounding device.

In 1935 Hellyer Brothers sold Arctic Queen to the USSR, who renamed her Pishchevaya Industriya and based her in Vladivostok. Lloyd's Register still listed her in 1945 but in later years deleted her, having assumed that so old a ship must have been scrapped or lost.

In 1979 Pishchevaya Industriya made her final voyage via Hong Kong to Kaohsiung in Taiwan, where she arrived in February to be scrapped after seven decades of service.

== Bibliography ==
- Heaton, Paul M (2004). Lamport & Holt Line. Abergavenny: PM Heaton Publishing. ISBN 1-872006-16-7.
- Lloyd's Register of Shipping (PDF). Vol. II.–Steamers & Motorships. London: Lloyd's Register. 1930 – via Southampton City Council.
- Lloyd's Register of Shipping (PDF). Vol. II.–Steamers & Motorships. London: Lloyd's Register. 1934 – via Southampton City Council.
- Lloyd's Register of Shipping (PDF). Vol. I.–Steamers & Motorships. London: Lloyd's Register. 1945.
- The Marconi Press Agency Ltd (1913). The Year Book of Wireless Telegraphy and Telephony. London: The St Katherine Press.
- Mercantile Navy List. London. 1930 – via Crew List Index Project.
