= MV Hydrotug 1 =

Tugboat

MV Hydrotug 1 is the world's first tugboat to be powered by combustion engines that burn hydrogen in combination with traditional fuel. Developed as part of a larger effort to reduce carbon emissions in maritime operations, it is one of the first tugboats in the world powered by combustion engines that can use hydrogen as well as traditional fuels. The vessel was delivered in late 2023 and started service in 2024.

== Construction ==
Hydrotug 1 was designed by the Belgian engineering firm CMB.TECH and built by Astilleros Armon Shipyard in Navia, Spain. It has a hybrid propulsion system that uses two BeHydro V12 medium-speed dual-fuel engines. Each engine produces about 2 megawatts of power. These engines can run on both traditional marine diesel and hydrogen. The vessel is 30.17 metres (99 ft 0 in) long and 12.5 metres (41 ft 0 in) wide, with a draft of approximately 5 to 6 metres (16 ft 5 in to 19 ft 8 in). It was assessed as 496 gross tonnage (GT) and 145 tons deadweight (DWT). It can achieve a bollard pull of around 65 tonnes (64 long tons; 72 short tons) and a service speed of over 14 knots (26 km/h; 16 mph). The hydrogen fuel is stored on board as compressed hydrogen gas. It is kept in deck-mounted stillages with a total storage capacity of about 415 kilograms (915 lb).

== Operations ==
The ship was conceived as a proof of concept of the prospects for hydrogen-powered combustion engines in shipping. Contrary to hydrogen fuel cell systems, Hydrotug 1 employs hydrogen in an internal combustion engine and can thus be used with little innovation on traditional engine systems. The tug forms part of the Port of Antwerp-Bruges's strategy to become a climate-neutral port by 2050. The hydrogen as a ship's fuel is set to lower CO_{2} and other pollutants' local emissions compared to traditional fossil fuels. Upon construction and fitting, Hydrotug1 was exported to Belgium in 2023. Following a test period and integration of its hydrogen equipment, it went into operational use in 2024.

== See also ==
- Hydrogen-powered ship
