= Compagnie Maritime Belge =

Antwerp ship-owning company

House Flag of the Compagnie Maritime Belge

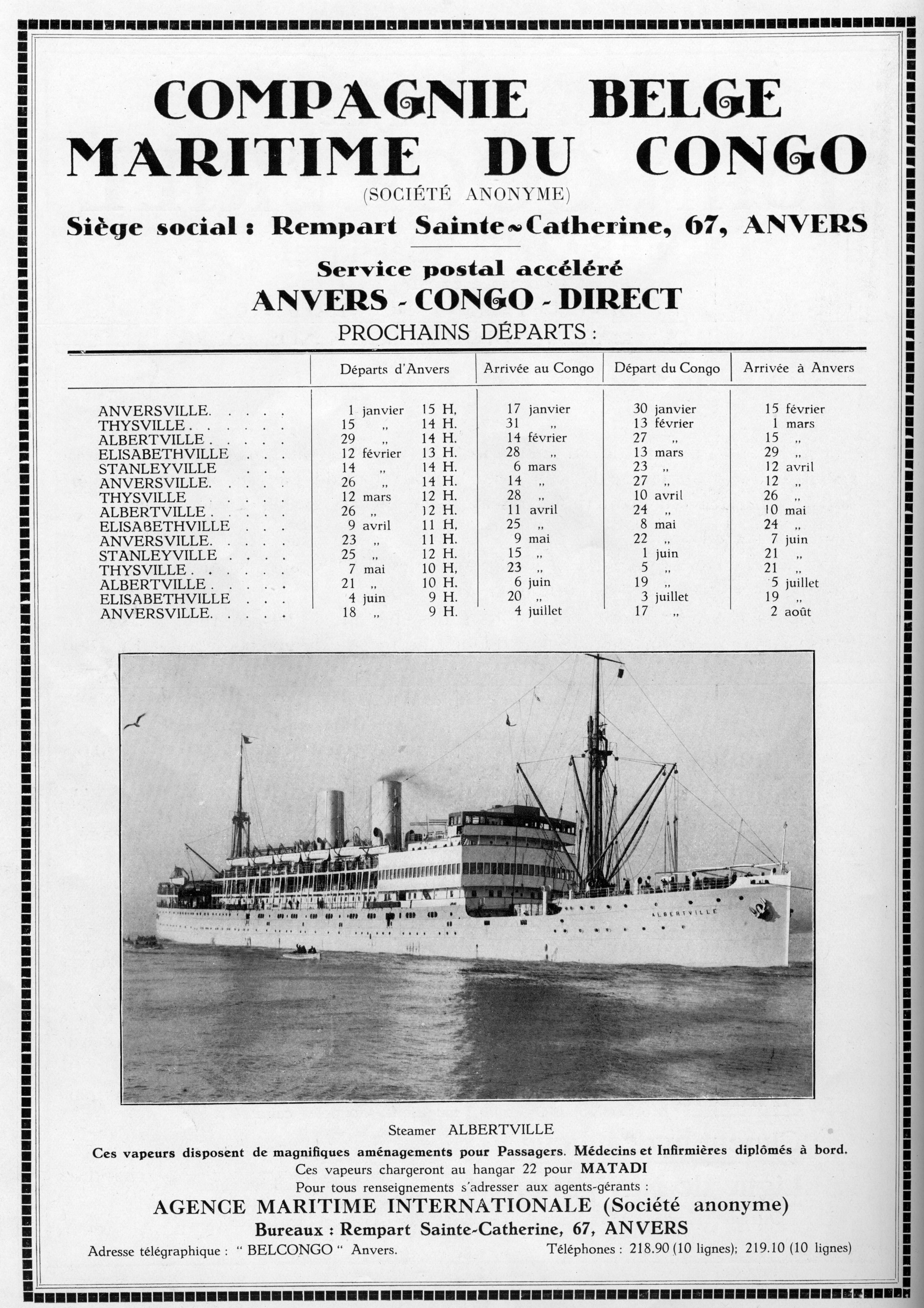
A pre-World War II poster for the Compagnie Maritime Belge

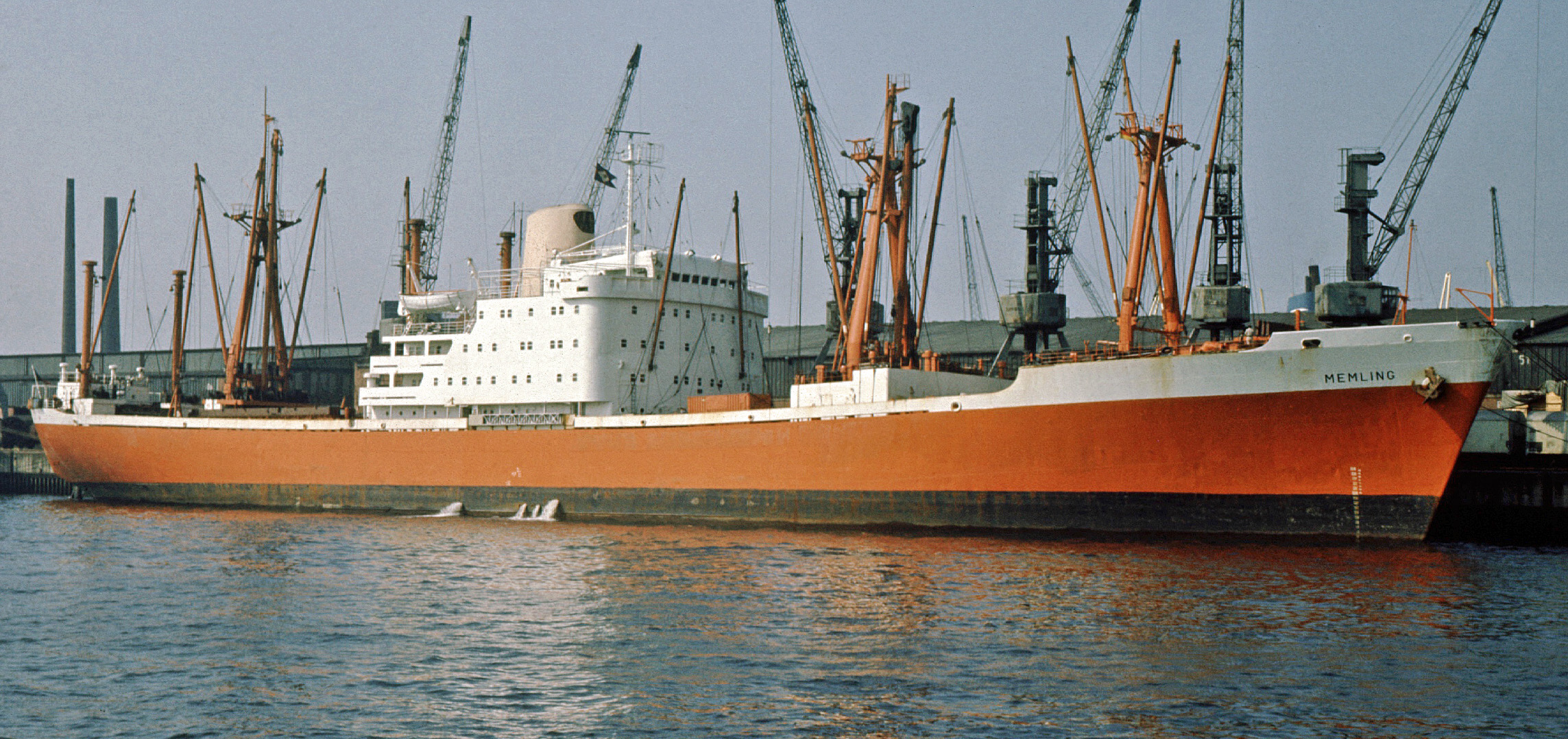
Typical colors of CMB cargo ships in the 1970s (Memling, 1973)

The Compagnie Maritime Belge (CMB) is one of the oldest Antwerp ship-owners. It is controlled by the Saverys family who also own major stakes in the Exmar and Euronav groups.

== History ==
CMB was founded in 1895 under the name Compagnie Belge Maritime du Congo (CBMC). At the request of Leopold II of Belgium and with support from British investors, a maritime connection was opened with Congo Free State. On 6 February 1895 the CMBC ship Léopoldville was the first to leave port of Antwerp for Congo Free State. For sixty years the Congo boats (Kongoboten) were a constant presence in the port of Antwerp.

In 1930 CBMC acquired Lloyd Royal Belge, another Belgian shipowner. The name of the new company became Compagnie Maritime Belge (CMB), and new lines were opened towards America and the Far East.

During World War II, on 24 December 1944, CMB's SS Léopoldville (1928), while transporting the 66th Infantry Division, was torpedoed and sank in under 3 hours, losing 763 American soldiers and 56 crew.

After World War II, the company introduced new ships, including the cargo passenger liners Jadotville (1956) and Baudouinville (1957). However, in 1961 it sold both these liners to P&O, who renamed them Chitral and Cathay and placed them in service in the Far East.

In 1960 the company Armement Deppe was acquired, and between 1975 and 1982 gradually also the tramp ship company Bocimar. The company entered the dry bulk trade in 1962 and continues to be a major dry bulk operator under its Bocimar banner. In 1975, the CMB group took a minority share in the dry bulk tramping company, Bocimar, which was increased to a majority share in 1982. In 1988, CMB bought Hessenatie, a large general cargo and container handling company in Antwerp. In July 1991 the Société Générale de Belgique, until then the main shareholder of the CMB, sold its shares to the holding Almabo and its shipping society Exmar, led by Marc Saverys. In 1995, half of CMB Transport (CMBT) was sold to Safmarine, a South African shipping company. In 1999, with the sale of the African network of AMI, CMB group's participation in the liner sector ceased and they focussed on the bulk carrier sector. In the same year, CMB gained full control of Euronav, an operator of crude oil tankers.

On June 28, 2019, Ocean Yield ASA announced the acquisition of newcastlemax dry bulk vessel from CMB for 40 million (USD) net of a seller's credit, with 15-year bareboat charter to CMB.

In 2020, it was announced that the MV Hydrotug 1, the first hydrogen-powered tugboat will be deployed in the port of Antwerp.

== Companies and holdings ==
=== Dry Bulk - Bocimar ===
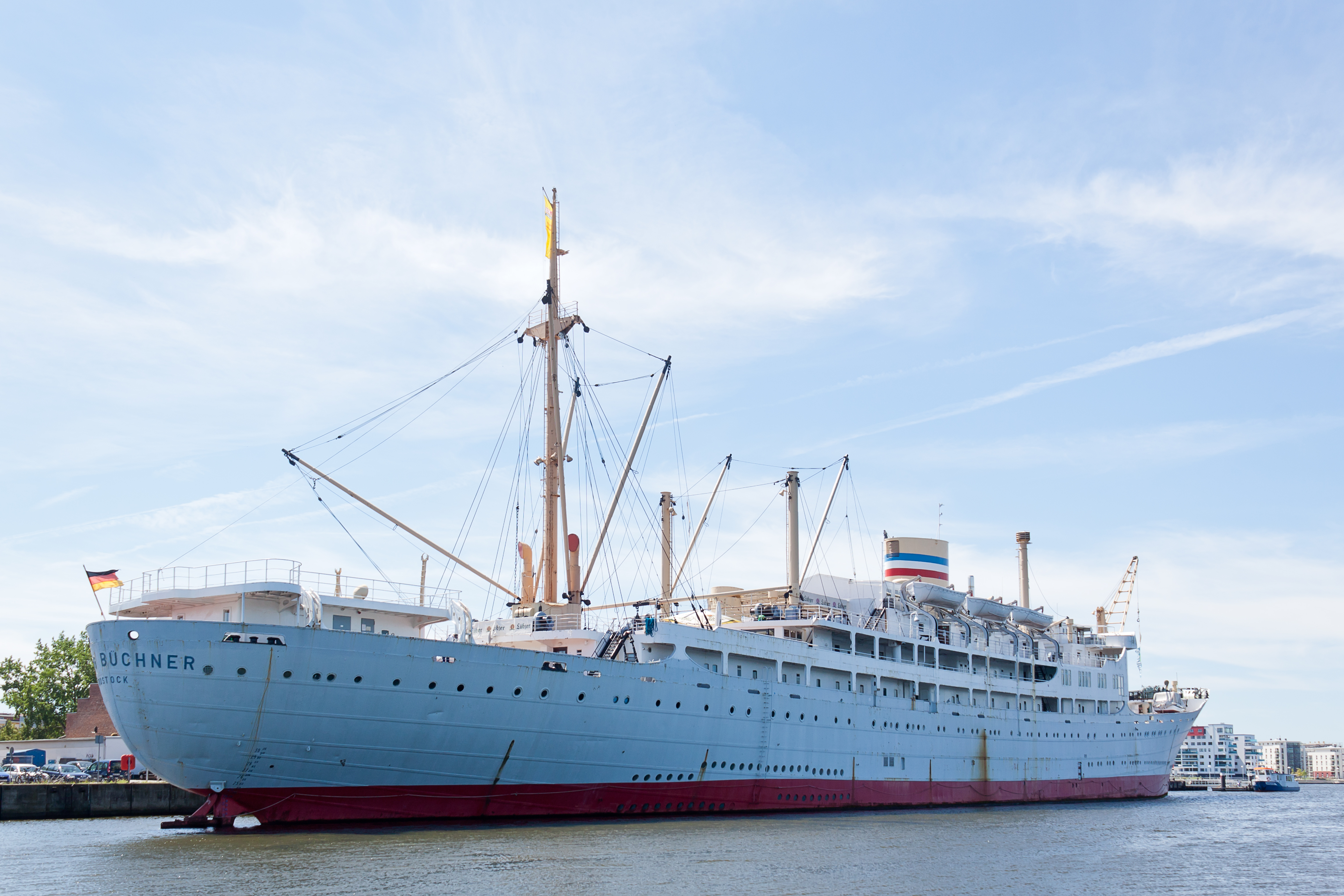
Charlesville, one of the CMB's liners

Bocimar International NV's fleet mainly consists of Capesize and Handysize bulk carriers. Some of these vessels are owned jointly with other shipowners such as the Wah Kwong Group (Hong Kong) and the Oak Maritime Group (Taiwan). It continues to build new vessels, the latest among them being at Hanjin Subic shipyard (HHIC Phil) and Samjin Shipyard (Korea)

Bocimar's business consists mostly of the transport of dry bulk goods, especially coal, ores and grains. It has a portfolio of contracts with customers from the steel and energy sectors, especially those from Japan.

Bocimar has offices in Tokyo (CMB Japan), Hong Kong, Singapore and New Delhi.

Its handy size vessels are further owned under Bohandymar, a subsidiary completely owned by the CMB Group.

Bocimar's vessels usually carry the prefix Mineral, CMB (vessels owned by Bocimar) or FMG (Vessels chartered out to Fortescue Metals Group)

As of 2017, its fleet consisted of 60 vessels ranging from Handysize to Capesize.

CMB owns 1 panamax tanker

=== Delphis (Container shipping) ===
Delphis NV is a regional container shipping company headquartered in Antwerp, Belgium. Delphis was founded in March 2004 and has offices in Antwerp and Oslo. It operates as a subsidiary of Saverco NV, one of the holding companies of CMB and provides logistics services in Europe through its subsidiary, Delphis logistics (founded 2009). Delphis fully owns the logistics company Team Lines and acquired the Sjursoya container terminal in Oslo, Norway in 2009. In March 2012, the remaining bulk carrier interests of Delphis were transferred formally to the CMB group.

Delphis controls a fleet of 40 owned and chartered container vessels ( 500 to 2500 TEU capacity) of which it owns 10 container vessels, including A La Marine, El Torro, Hermes Arrow and Maersk Nimes Its management team consists of Alexander Saverys (managing director), Chris Vermeersch (chief financial officer and manager finance).

=== ASL Aviation ===
ASL Aviation group is registered in Dublin. It owns, operates and manages a fleet of nearly 90 aircraft. It was formed in 1972 as Air Bridge Carriers UK, acquired by the Hunting group in the 1980s, rechristened to Hunting Cargo Airlines in 1992 and transferred to Ireland in 1997. In June 1998, it was sold to a consortium consisting of CMB and Safair (part of the Imperial Group) and rechristened ACL (Air Contractors Limited). In 2007, Imperial sold its shareholding, and CMB has been its sole owner since 2010.

Its major clients include DHL, UPS, TNT Express and Aer Lingus; and it charters out its aircraft through Europe Airpost and Safair.

As of September 2013, ASL Aviation's owned fleet consisted of:

- 6 Airbus A300B4 freighters
- 15 ATR 42-300 freighters and passenger craft
- 18 Boeing 737-400 freighters and passenger craft
- 7 Lockheed L-382 Hercules
- 4 Fokker F27 freighters

== Shareholding ==
Shares of the CMB group are listed on NYSE Code CMB.BR, Euronext Brussels and are included in the Next 150 index. Its major shareholders are Saverco/Marc Saverys (49,43%), Victrix/Virginie Saverys (15,99%) with the balance owned by CMB and third parties

Similar to other ship owners, CMB's earnings declined in the worldwide economic recession starting from 2007. However, they started to bounce back towards the end of 2012, and started recording profits from 2013.

== See also ==
- SS Burgondier
- BeHydro

== Other sources ==
- G. Devos, G. Elewaut, CMB 100. Een Eeuw Compagnie Maritime Belge, Tielt, Lannoo, 1995
- Lederer, André (1977). L'expansion belge outre-mer et la Compagnie Maritime Belge (PDF). Brussels: ARSOM.
