= Parliament Hill rehabilitation =

Program of restoration of Parliament Hill buildings

Centre Block
- Status: Closed
- Closing date: 2018

East Block
- Status: Operating
- Cost: $167 million
- Opening date: 1866
- Closing date: 2016

West Block
- Status: Operating
- Cost: $863 million
- Opening date: 2018
- Closing date: 2011

Wellington Building
- Status: Operating
- Cost: $425 million
- Opening date: 2016
- Closing date: 2010

Sir John A. Macdonald Building
- Status: Operating
- Cost: $99.5 million
- Opening date: 2015
- Closing date: 2012

Government Conference Centre
- Status: Operating
- Cost: $269 million
- Closing date: 2013

Ride statistics
- Total cost: $3 billion

The Parliament Hill rehabilitation is a series of ongoing rehabilitation and preservation projects at the complex on Parliament Hill, in Ottawa, Ontario, Canada. The $3-billion project aims to preserve and rehabilitate the Parliament of Canada and various buildings within the Parliamentary Precinct.

A series of interior renovations began in 2002 by the Public Works and Government Services Canada at the direction of the National Capital Commission, and is concentrated on the Centre Block, West Block, and East Block, Library of Parliament, Confederation Building, and the Justice Building.

== History ==
In 2002, an extensive $1 billion renovation project began across the parliamentary precinct, specifically focusing on masonry restoration, asbestos removal, vehicle screening, parking, electrical and mechanical systems, and improved visitors' facilities. The Library of Parliament and Peace Tower, as well as some exterior areas of masonry on the Centre Block have so far been completed, though focus has shifted to the West Block due to its rapidly deteriorating cladding. Before 2018, when the Centre Block is slated to be closed for five years in order to carry out an extensive interior restoration and upgrade, the inner courtyard of West Block will be enclosed and fitted with temporary chambers for the House of Commons. The Senate will move to the Government Conference Centre.

In 2007, the government approved an updated Long-Term Vision and Plan to be carried out through a series of five-year programs. Each program includes primary projects to rehabilitate key heritage buildings, urgent building repairs to ensure the ongoing viability of buildings and to address health and safety issues, and planning activities to develop the next five-year program. The first priority as outlined in the Long-Term Vision and Plan is to renovate the core historic Parliament buildings, the triad of the West Block, Centre Block, and East Block. The Centre Block cannot be renovated while it is occupied, its occupants will be relocated and will use the East and West blocks as interim space. These buildings also need rehabilitation work, which will have to be done first. Before this work can take place, the functions displaced from the East and West blocks need to be relocated in interim or new accommodation. In 2026, a renovation to restore 24 Sussex Drive was also announced.

== Timeline ==
- In 1988, the East Block 1910 Wing restoration begins. It was completed in 1997.
- In 1992, the West Block project receives preliminary approval. The project receives final approval in 1997, is postponed in 1998, and receives revised preliminary approval in 2005.
- In 1993, the Peace Tower masonry repair begins. It was completed in 1997.
- In 1995, the Centre Block South façade restoration begins. It was completed in 1998.
- In 1997, the construction of Centre Block Underground Services rehabilitation begins. It was completed in 1998.
- In 2001, the preliminary approval of new construction, the Bank Street Building, was granted. The Bank Street Building construction was cancelled in 2005.
- In 2002, the Library of Parliament rehabilitation begins. It was completed in 2006.
- In 2005, projects to provide swing space or relocate functions for West and East blocks begin. These projects are ongoing as of 2015.
- In 2010, the Wellington Building rehabilitation begins. It was completed in 2016.
- In 2012 the Sir John A. MacDonald Building (previously the Bank of Montreal Building) rehabilitation began. It was completed in 2015.

== Buildings ==
=== Centre Block ===
A major rehabilitation of Centre Block is currently underway. The building has been emptied prior to initiating the rehabilitation, which aims to restore the building's crumbling stonework, frescos and stained glass and also replacing mechanical, electrical and fire safety systems. Until the major rehabilitation begun, maintenance and repair work was carried out.

The Centre Block closed on December 12, 2018, and renovations may take up to 2028 or longer.

=== East Block ===
The exterior rehabilitation work underway on the East Block aims to preserve the building's distinctive characteristics. Planning and building investigation work is underway and will include an upgrade to the masonry work on the 1867 Wing of the building. Rehabilitation work has also begun on the Northwest Tower, which will include structural and seismic reinforcement and the installation of a new copper roof.

The East Block exterior rehabilitation work (Phase 1) was completed in 2022 and currently assessing Phase 2 restoration and modernization of the building and thus building will remain vacant.

=== West Block ===
Both the interior and the exterior of the building will be rehabilitated, which will include the restoration of the masonry, modernization of life-safety systems and seismic upgrades. The rehabilitation will include construction of a permanent courtyard infill and the first phase of a visitor welcome centre. Public Works and Government Services Canada will enclose the courtyard of West Block for use as a temporary legislative chamber while Centre Block is out of commission.

The West Block re-opened in 2018.

=== Wellington Building ===
The Wellington Building, located at 180 Wellington Street was renovated to extend its lifecycle and was repurposed from an administrative office function into parliamentary accommodations so that the East Block and the Centre Block can be emptied and fully restored. It houses 70 parliamentary offices and 10 committee rooms. The work began in 2010 and the building re-opened in 2016.

=== Sir John A. Macdonald Building ===
The building on the southwest corner of Wellington and O’Connor, known to most in Ottawa since it was built in 1930 as the Bank of Montreal building. The Beaux-Arts façade has been conservered with a modern addition to its west at a cost of just under $100 million. It houses parliamentary ceremonial and committee rooms.

== Gallery ==
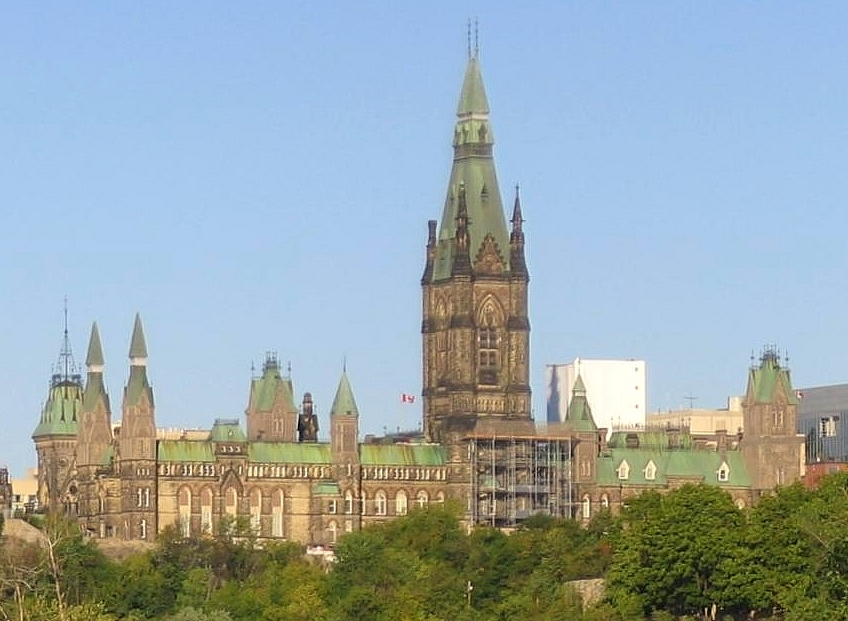
The West Block of Parliament Hill

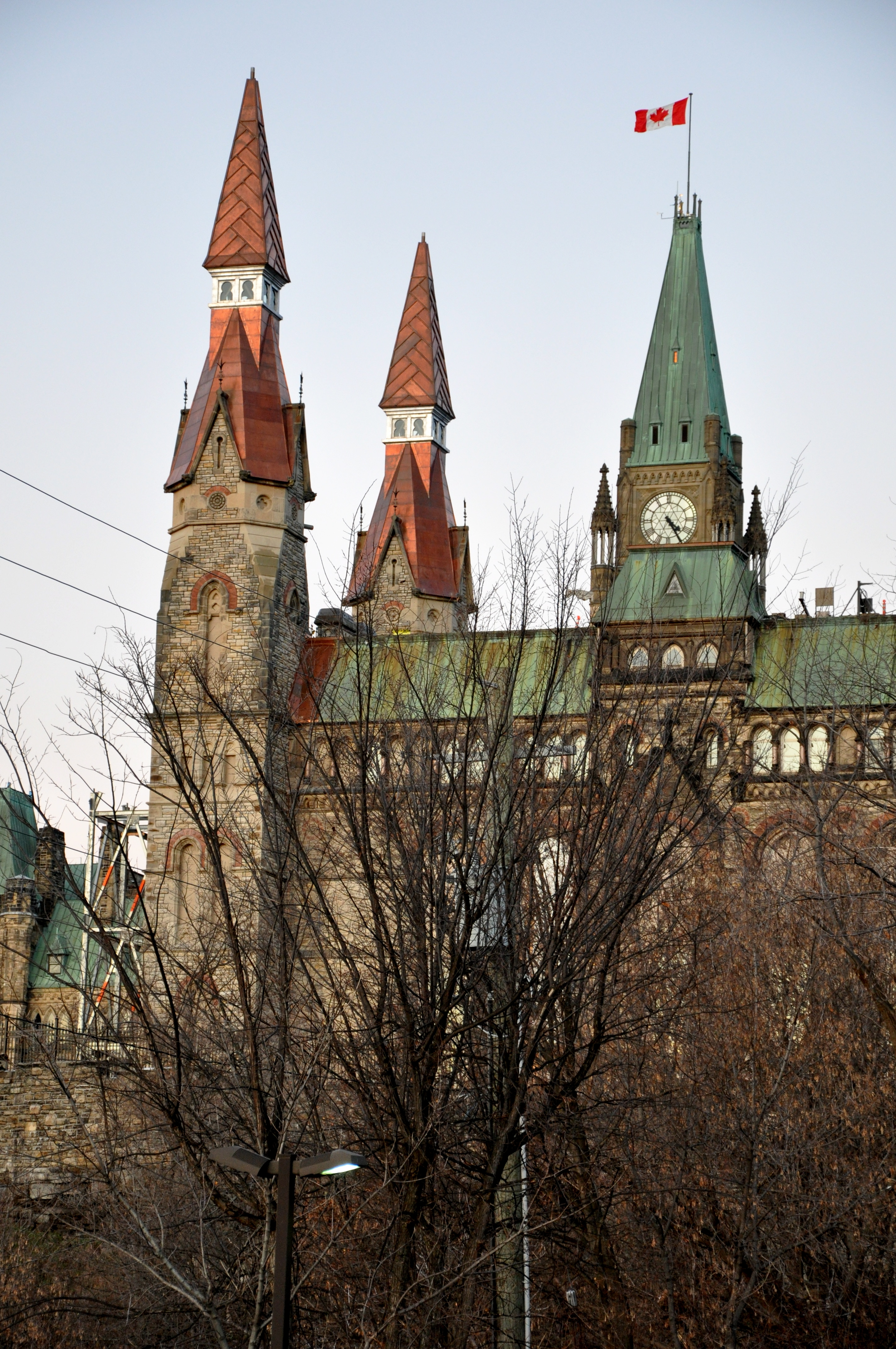
A restored facade of north towers on West Block, Parliament Hill.

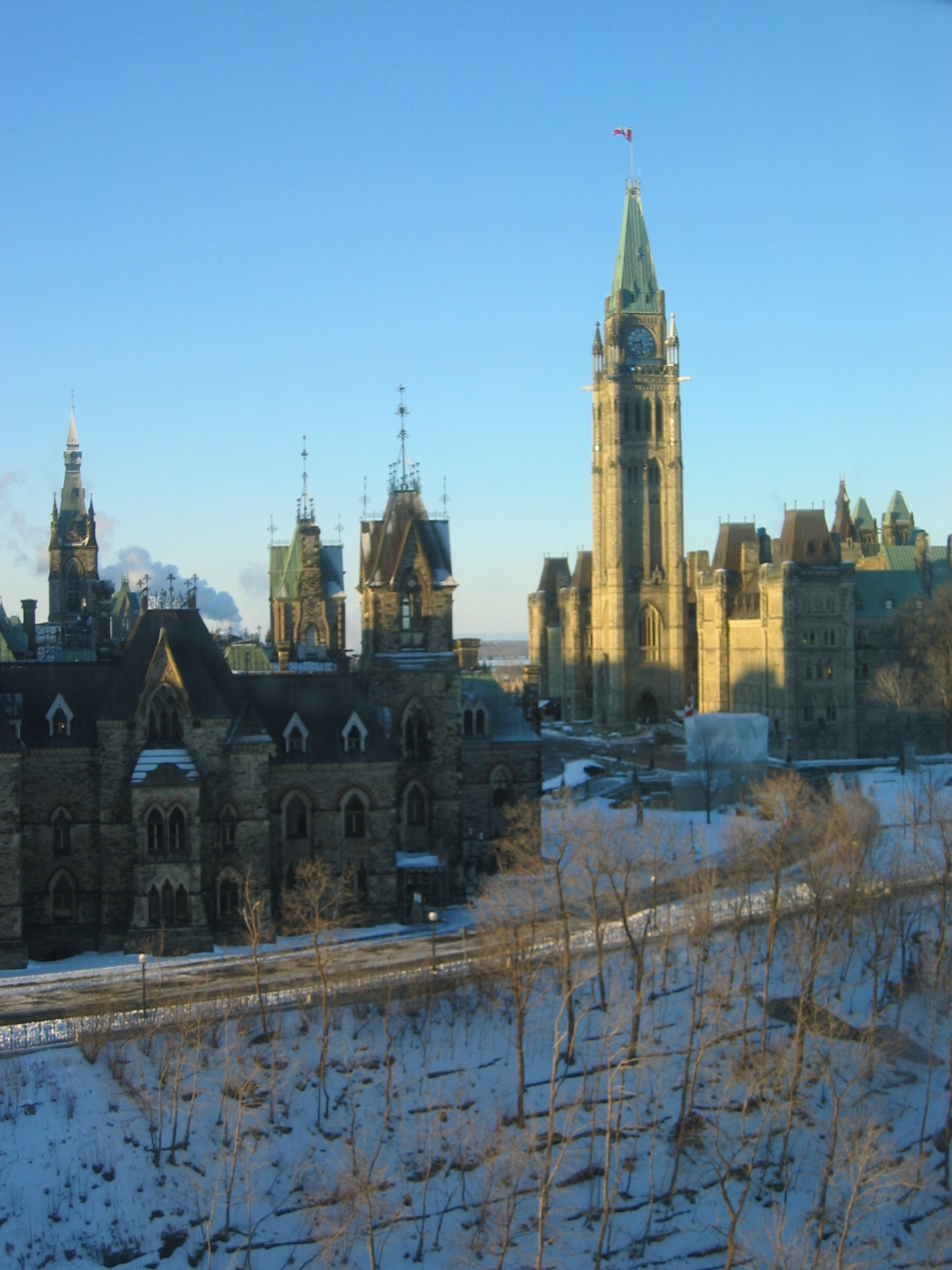
The East Block (left) and West Block (beyond), with its Mackenzie Tower, frame the south facade and Peace Tower of the Centre Block
