= Sir John A. Macdonald Building =

Federal office building in Ottawa

Coordinates: 45.422225°N 75.699765°W

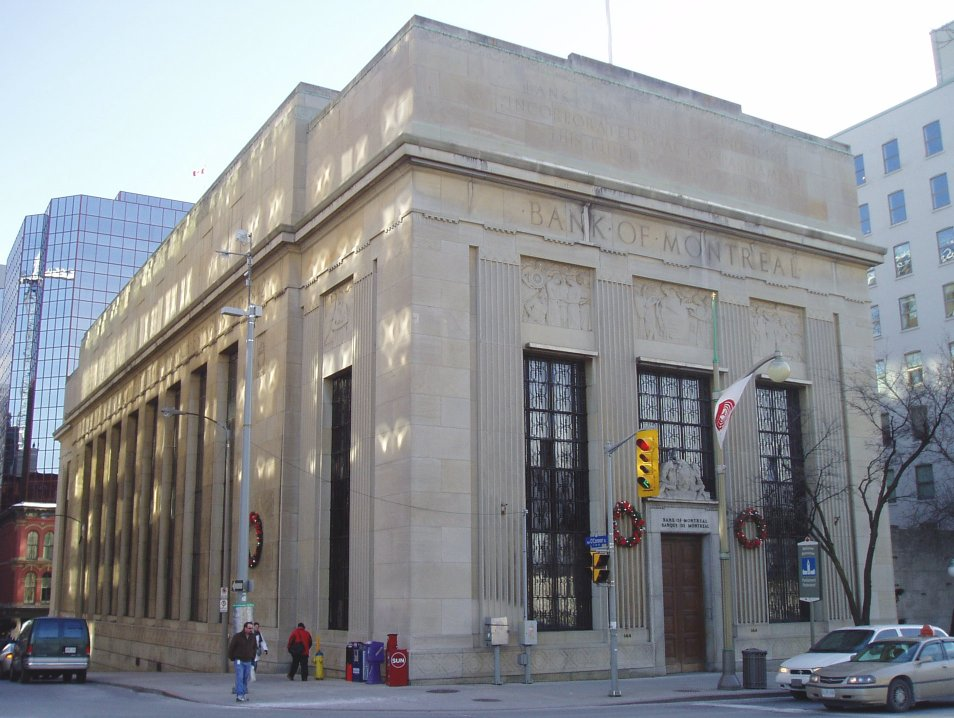
144 Wellington St., facade of the bank

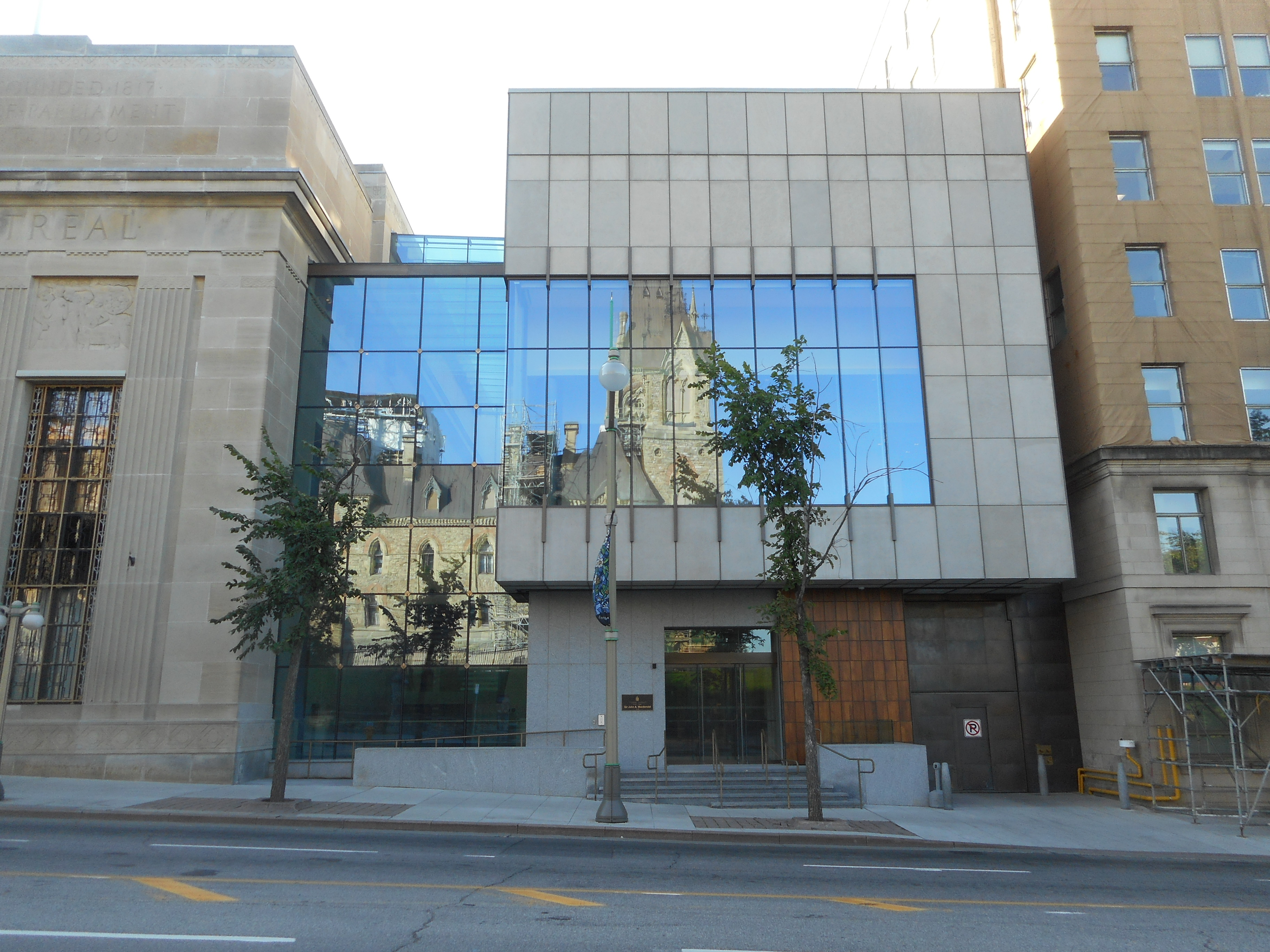
Annex

The Sir John A. Macdonald Building is a building in Ottawa, Ontario, Canada. Now owned by the federal government of Canada, the building was formerly a bank. It is located at 144 Wellington Street, at the corner of O'Connor Street, with a third frontage on Sparks Street, just in front of West Block of Parliament.

== Background ==
Its façade indicates its former heritage as a Bank of Montreal branch location. The Sir John A. Macdonald Building is an example of Beaux-Arts architecture. Designed by E.I. Barott, it was built in 1930. It reflects the integration of several styles, including classical elements that had long been used to design Canadian banks. The Doric columns or the classical structure are flattened. Rather than classical figures, the exterior of the building is carved with scenes depicting Canadian industry and architecture. As the building is on a slope, the Sparks Street entrance is a storey below the Wellington Street one. This below-grade section is made of granite, while the upper level is of limestone.

The Government of Canada ordered the Bank of Montreal to vacate the building before May 2005. The Bank of Montreal was the last commercial building on this downtown street, just in front of the Parliament buildings. Now all buildings on Wellington Street between Elgin Street and the Ottawa River Parkway are federal government property.

On January 11, 2012, the building was renamed the Sir John A. Macdonald Building.

As of 2015, the building is used for parliamentary business and reception functions.

With the Centre Block on Parliament Hill closed for major renovations, former Prime Minister Brian Mulroney, after his death on February 29, 2024, was brought to the Sir John A. Macdonald Building for his Lying in state on March 19 and 20, 2024.
