= Centre Block =

Main building of Canada's parliament

- Centre Block, 2013

General information
- Architectural style: Gothic Revival
- Location: Ottawa, Ontario, Canada
- Coordinates: 45.425°N 75.700°W
- Construction started: 1859; Reconstruction: 24 July 1916; Renovation: 2018–2031
- Completed: Current building: 1 July 1927; 99 years ago
- Owner: Canadian Government (Public Services and Procurement Canada)

Design and construction
- Architects: John A. Pearson and Jean-Omer Marchand

The Centre Block (French: Édifice du Centre) is the main building of the Canadian Parliament buildings on Parliament Hill, in Ottawa, Ontario, containing the House of Commons and Senate chambers, as well as the offices of a number of members of parliament, senators, and senior administration for both legislative houses. It is also the location of several ceremonial spaces, such as the Hall of Honour, the Memorial Chamber, and Confederation Hall.

Built in the Gothic Revival style, the present Centre Block is the building's second iteration. The first was destroyed by fire in 1916; all that remains of the original building is the Library of Parliament, at the rear of the Centre Block. Though construction began immediately after the blaze, sculpting work on the interior continued through the 1970s. Then, from 2018, MPs were moved elsewhere for renovations lasting until 2031.

One of the most recognizable buildings in Canada, the Centre Block is depicted on the Canadian $10 bill (the Library of Parliament), $20 bill (the Peace Tower), and the $50 bill.

== Characteristics ==
Designed by Jean-Omer Marchand and John A. Pearson, the Centre Block is a symmetrical structure, 144 m (472 ft) long by 75 m (246 ft) deep, and six storeys high, built in the modern Gothic Revival style. As such, it displays a multitude of stone carvings, including gargoyles, grotesques, and friezes, keeping with the Victorian High Gothic style of the rest of the parliamentary complex. The walls are faced with more than 50,000 blocks of over 24 different types of stone, though a rustic finished Nepean sandstone is the predominant kind of masonry, with dressed stone trim around the 550 windows and other edges. The roof is of reinforced concrete covered with copper, and dotted with dormer windows. The interior walls are sheeted with Tyndall stone, a dolomitic limestone quarried in southeastern Manitoba and chosen by the architect for the richness of its vibrant colour and rich pattern formed by darker brown spots which are fossilized shallow marine mud burrows. These surfaces are augmented by sculptural decoration done in Indiana limestone.

The Centre Block houses offices and facilities, including the office of the Prime Minister, that of the Leader of the Official Opposition, and the offices of other party leaders, as well as senators, ministers, and Commons staff. Further, there are numerous parliamentary committee rooms and the Parliamentary Press Gallery.

=== Confederation Hall ===
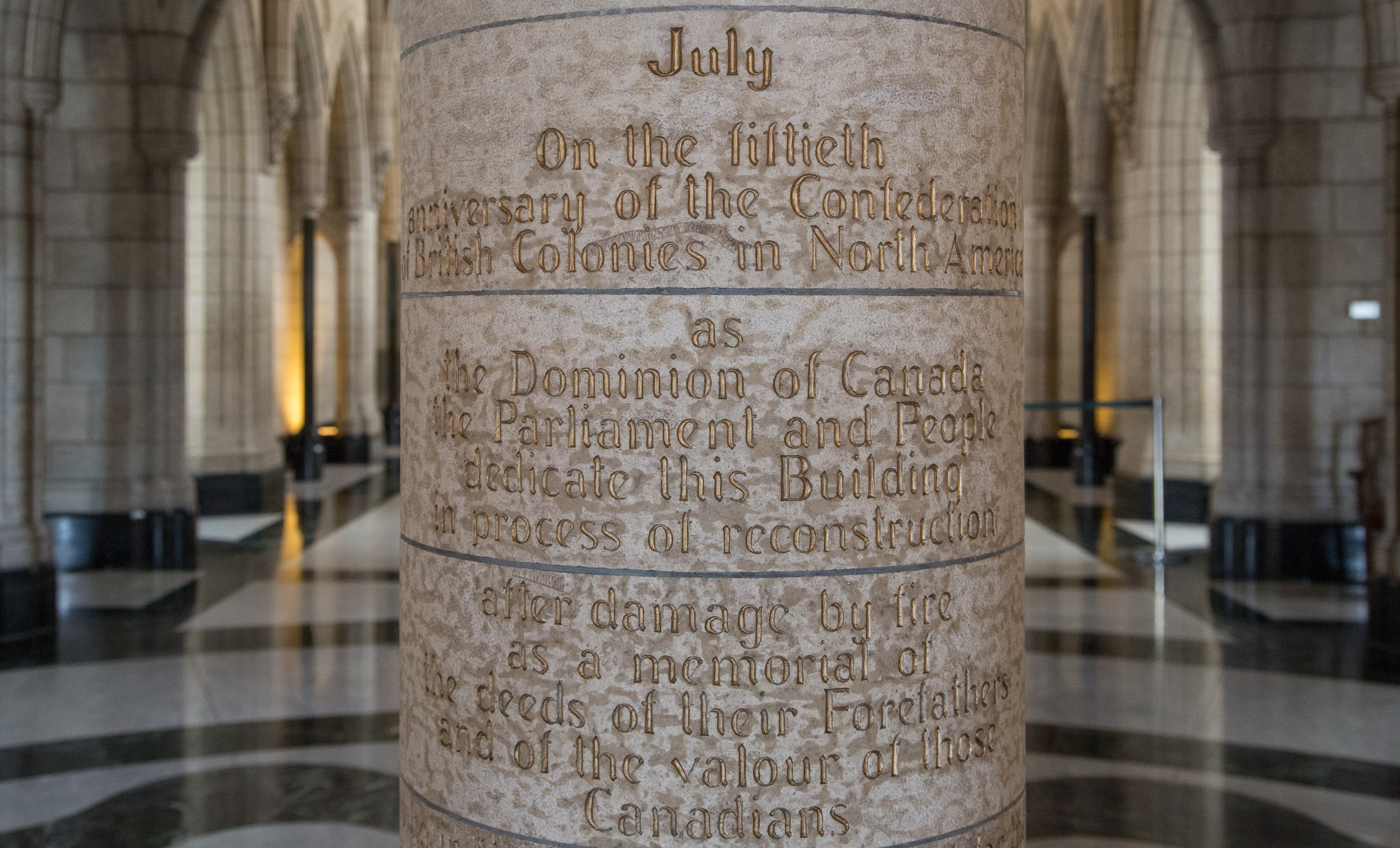
The carving on the central column placed in commemoration of the 50th anniversary of Canadian Confederation

The Centre Block is arranged symmetrically around Confederation Hall, located immediately inside the main entrance. It is an octagonal chamber, the perimeter of which is divided by limestone clustered columns into eight bays of two different sizes, themselves subdivided by dark green syenite pillars. Behind these runs a vaulted ambulatory that supports the upper gallery. The arcaded arches are topped by gables sculpted to commemorate the confederated nature of Canada and they support one side of the hall's fan vaulted ceiling with carved bosses, while the other side rests on a single column in the centre of the room. This column is borne on a stone carved with an image of Neptune amongst sea lions and fish in a mythical sea. It was placed at noon on 2 July 1917, to mark the 50th anniversary of Confederation, and above it was carved the words:

1867 July 1917 On the fiftieth anniversary of the Confederation of British Colonies in North America as the Dominion of Canada the Parliament and People dedicate this Building in process of reconstruction after damage by fire as a memorial of the deeds of their Forefathers and of the valour of those Canadians who in the Great War fought for the liberties of Canada, of the Empire and of Humanity.

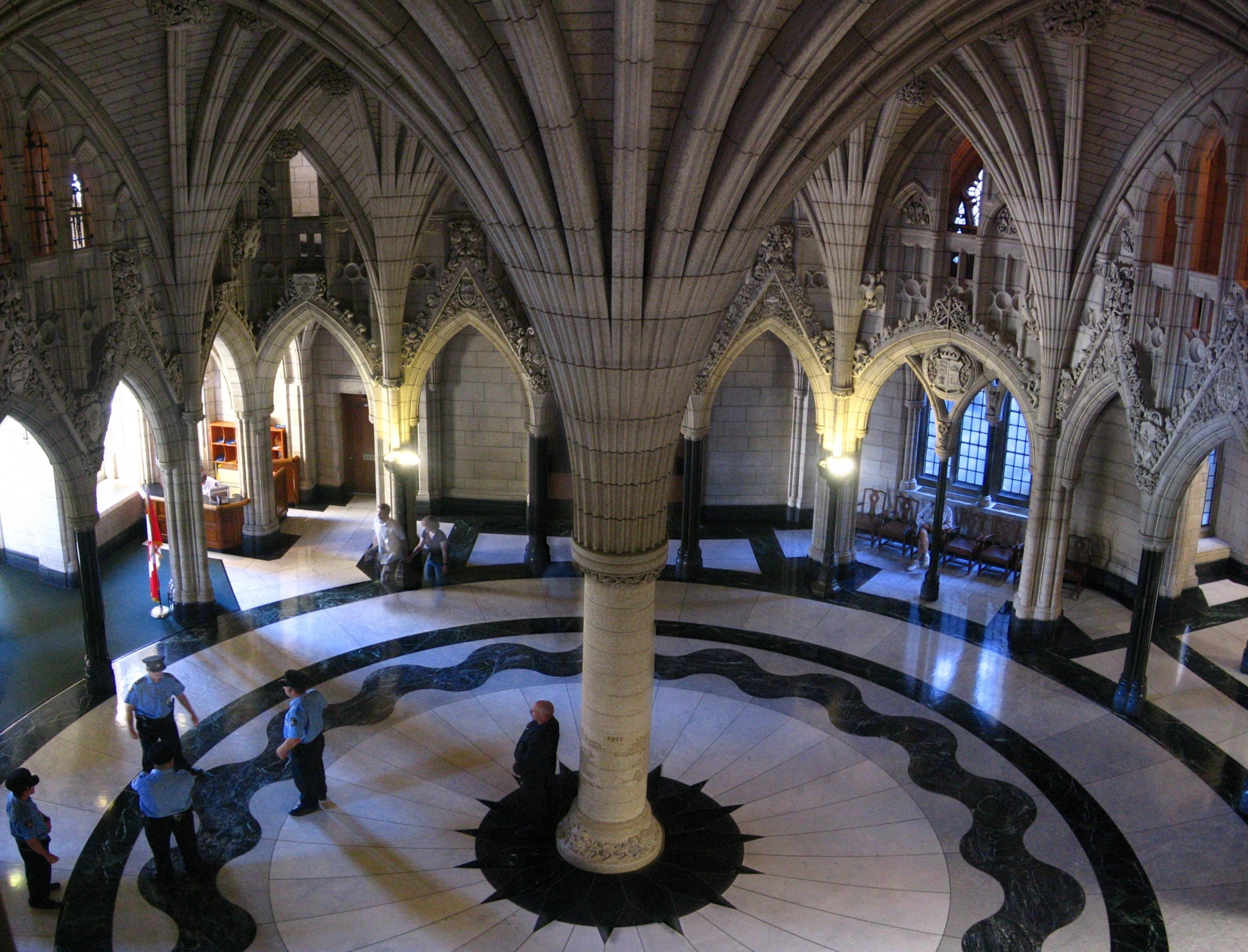
Confederation Hall inside Centre Block. A 16-point windrose and swirl pattern representing Canada's national motto, a mari usque ad mare, surrounds the central column.

Around the central column is an inlaid marble floor with a 16-point windrose of Verde Antique serpentine from Roxbury, Vermont, United States, and a swirl pattern of green serpentine from the Greek island of Tinos, embedded in Missisquoi boulder grey marble, from Philipsburg, Quebec. The overall pattern represents the essential element of water, alluding to Canada's motto: a mari usque ad mare (from sea to sea). The inner and outer circles of the floor are made of a Missisquoi black marble from Philipsburg and white travertine from Italy, as well as Verde Antique serpentine separated by a band of Missisquoi boulder grey marble.

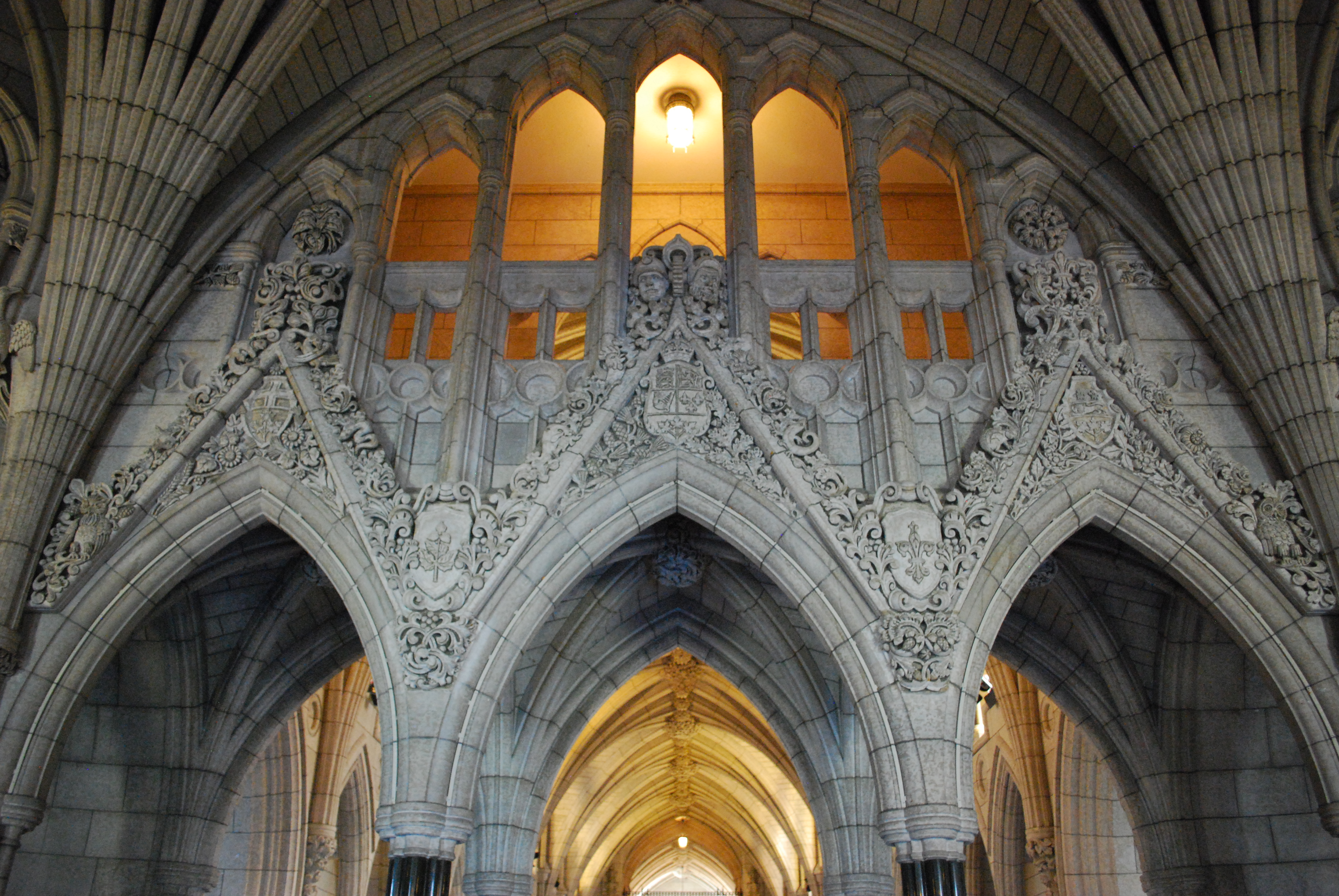
The rotunda's tympanum adorned with the coats of arms of Ontario, of Canada, and of Quebec

Though a design model of the room was presented as early as January 1918, Confederation Hall was the last part of the Centre Block's interior to be completed; the Missisquoi black marble base was laid on 11 August 1921 and the Tyndall limestone vault—built from a full-scale wood and plaster model—was completed in December of the following year. Still, the detailed carving, the designs for which had been finalized by Cléophas Soucy in 1941, remained incomplete until 1953, due to occurrence of the Second World War. Upon completion of this work, the tympanums were adorned with the coats of arms of Canada and the provinces, each surrounded by relevant floral symbols: on the east wall thistles for Nova Scotia, Tudor roses for Prince Edward Island, and grapes and apples for New Brunswick; on the south wall lilies, maple leaves, and Tudor roses for Newfoundland and Labrador, pine cones, oak leaves, and acorns for Nunavut, and maple leaves for British Columbia; on the west wall grapevines and apples for Saskatchewan, sunflowers, corn, and wheat for Alberta, and wheat and pine cones for Manitoba; and on the west wall sunflowers, wheat, and corn for Ontario, pine cones, oak leaves, and acorns for Canada, and Tudor roses for Quebec. The remaining territorial coats of arms are located in the southeast (Northwest Territories) and southwest (Yukon) corners. The gable springers all display the coats of arms of the provincial and territorial capitals, while the gable ramparts bear symbols of Canada's fauna.

The apex stones atop each central arch are carved into figures from Canadian life, two Inuit with huskies being found on the east wall, two heads each representing the merchant marine and agriculture on the south wall, two of Canada's First Nations people on the west wall, and a lumberjack and miner with a wheel of industry on the north wall. There were originally two renditions of the sovereign's Canadian arms, one each on the north and south walls of Confederation Hall; however, the latter was reworked in 2000 by Maurice Joanisse into the above-mentioned coat of arms of the newly created territory of Nunavut.

=== Hall of Honour ===
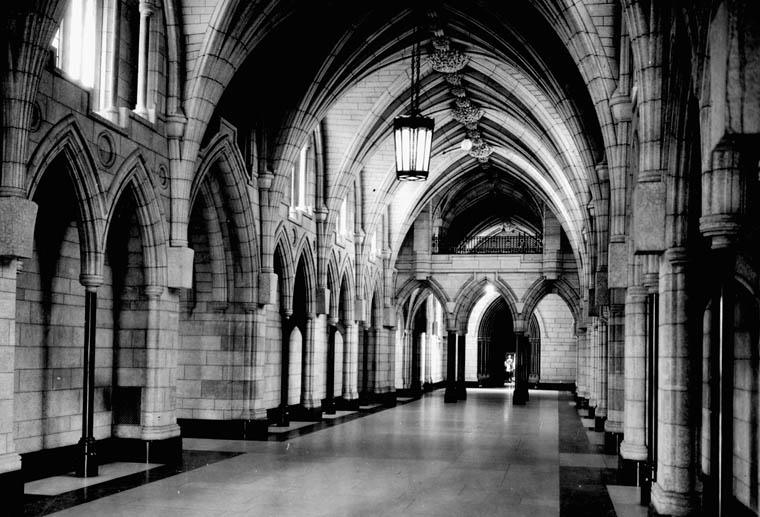
Hall of Honour, c. 1920s

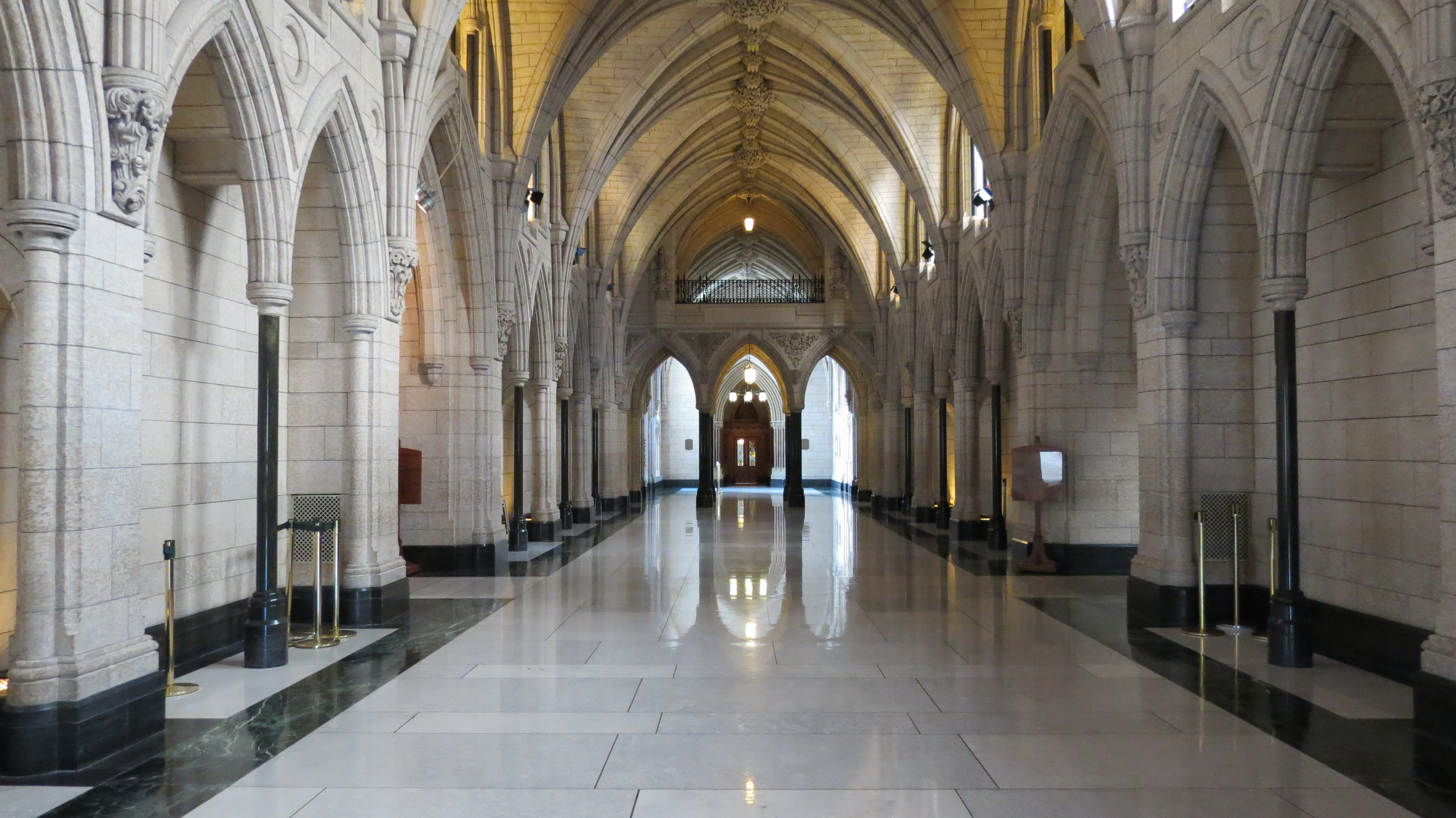
Hall of Honour, 2013

Images of the Hall of Honour approximately a century apart. From 1947 to 1949, corbels were sculpted in the hall.

Extending from Confederation Hall is the Centre Block's north to south axis, running between the Library of Parliament and the Peace Tower, through the Hall of Honour, which serves as the route of the parades for both speakers of parliament, as well as where the lying in state segment of some state funerals takes place. It is a long, rib-vaulted space of Tyndall limestone divided into five bays by superimposed double arcades of lancet arches atop clustered columns on pedestals. These bays are subdivided in half by single-storey pointed arches on dark green syenite pillars, above which sit clerestory windows of cusped lights segmented by Missisquoi Black marble posts, though only those on the east of the hall are windows, while the others are blind. Running the length of the hall and resting on corbels carved into early English foliage and other customary symbols, is a ribbed vault ceiling rising to bosses carved with Tudor roses and fleurs-de-lis. The hall is bisected by small, vaulted corridors, the east one leading to a committee room, and the west to the old reading room; the latter is known as the Correspondents' Entrance, as it is lined with bosses and label stops sculpted by Cléophas Soucy between 1949 and 1950 into the visages of ten notable parliamentary correspondents: Charles Bishop, Henri Bourassa, John Wesley Dafoe, Joseph Howe, Grattan O'Leary, Frank Oliver, John Ross Robertson, Philip Dansken Ross, Joseph Israël Tarte, and Robert S. White.

The north end of the hall is crossed on both levels by the Centre Block's north corridor, with an overlooking gallery lined by iron railings by Paul Beau. The Hall of Honour was intended to be a gallery where statues of notable Canadians would be arranged in the niches along each side. That plan was later abandoned in favour of a more general purpose of commemorating the 1916 fire, as well as honouring those who participated in the Great War. The sculptures remain incomplete; only the north end, closest to the Library of Parliament, has completed carvings. The largest of these stone sculptures is a low relief memorial to nursing in Canada, depicting those care-givers who participated in World War I, while another work, Canada Remembers, pays tribute to those who were involved in the Second World War. Two other pieces mark the efforts of early nation-building, such as that donated by Canadians living in the United States and which celebrates the 60th anniversary of Confederation.

=== Senate Chamber ===
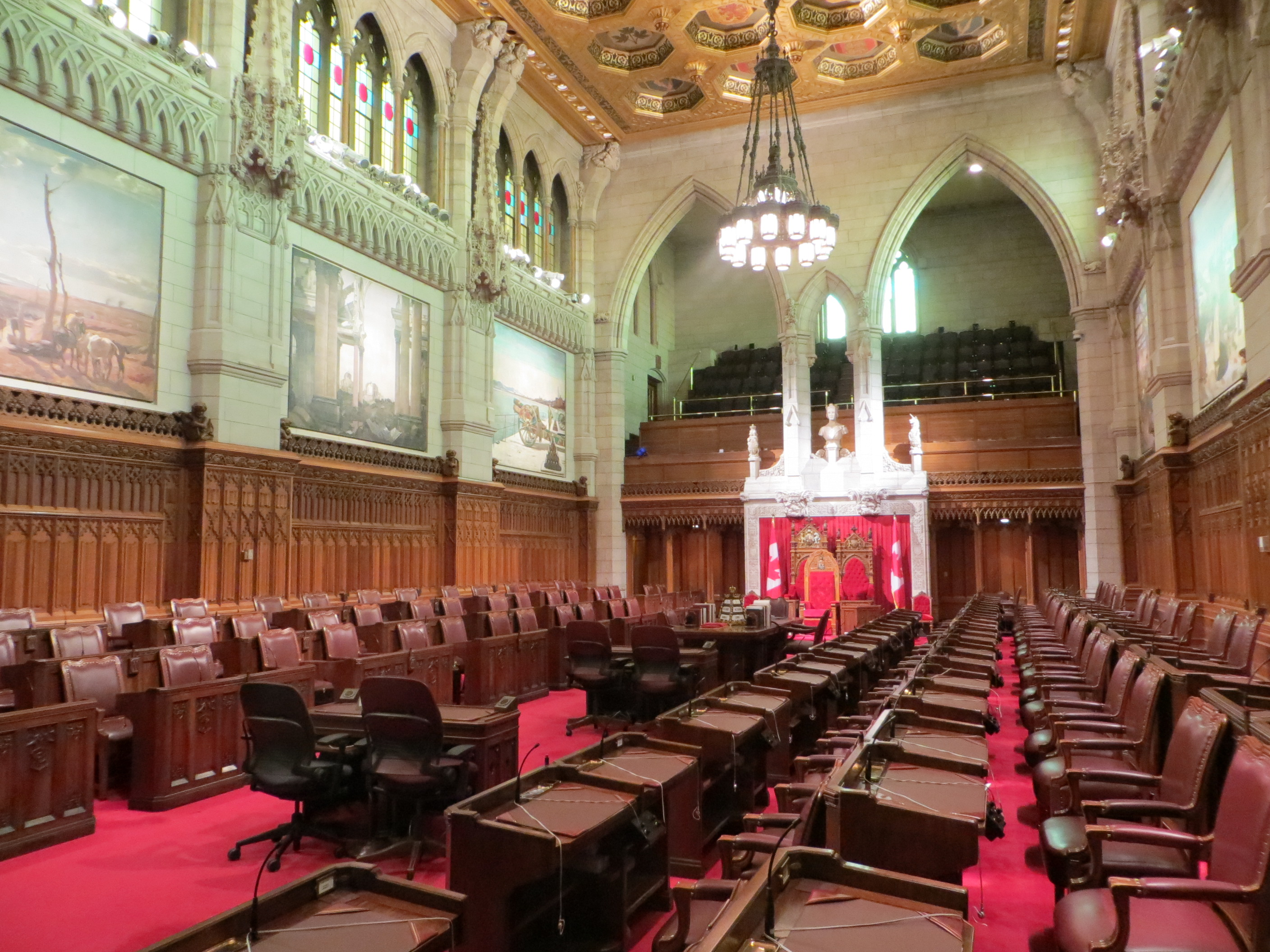
The Senate chamber in 2016, containing the thrones and senators' seats

In Centre Block's east wing is the Senate chamber, in which are the thrones for the Canadian monarch and his consort, or for the federal viceroy and his or her consort, and from which the sovereign or the governor general gives the Speech from the Throne and grants royal assent to bills passed by Parliament. The senators in the chamber who belong to the governing party sit to the speaker of the Senate's right and the opposition sit to the speaker's left. On the centre table sits the Diamond Jubilee Calendar, paid for by donations from senators and commissioned to mark the 60th anniversary of Elizabeth II's accession as Queen of Canada, it displays symbols chosen to depict the evolution of the French and British Crowns into that of Canada.

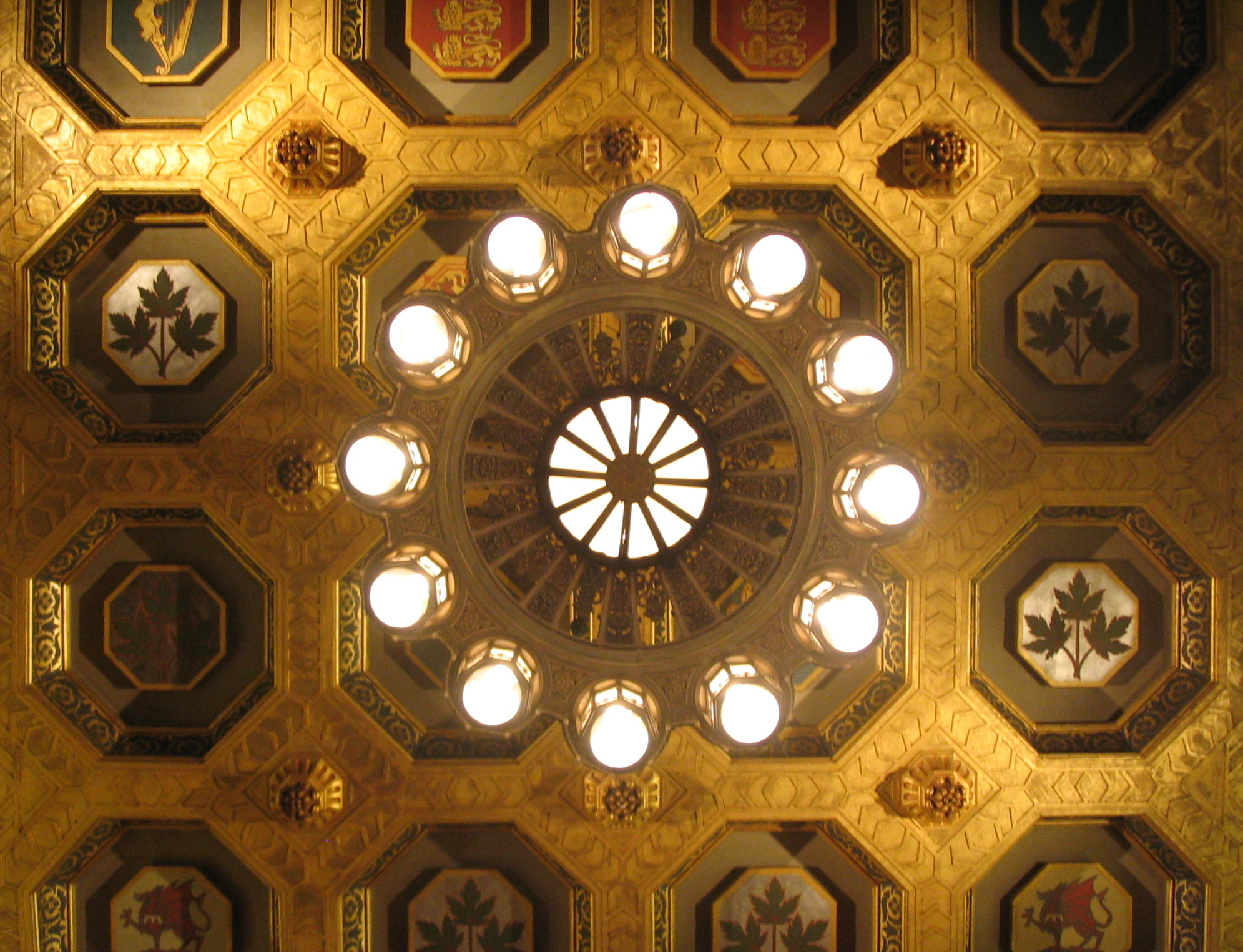
The gilded and painted coffers of the Senate chamber ceiling

The Senate chamber's overall colour is red, seen in the upholstery, carpeting, and draperies, and reflecting the colour scheme of the House of Lords in the United Kingdom; red was a more royal colour, associated with the Crown and hereditary peers. Capping the room is a gilt ceiling with deep octagonal coffers, each filled with heraldic symbols, including maple leaves, fleurs-de-lis, lions rampant, clàrsach, Welsh Dragons, and lions passant. This plane rests on six pairs and four single pilasters, each of which is capped by a caryatid, and between which are clerestory windows. Below the windows is a continuous architrave, broken only by baldachins at the base of each of the above pilasters.

On the chamber's east and west walls are eight murals depicting scenes from the First World War. Painted in between 1916 and 1920, they were originally part of the more than 1,000 piece Canadian War Memorials Fund, founded by the Lord Beaverbrook, and were intended to hang in a specific memorial structure. But the project was never completed and the works were stored at the National Gallery of Canada until, in 1921, parliament requested some of the collection's oil paintings on loan for display in the Centre Block. The murals have remained in the Senate chamber ever since.

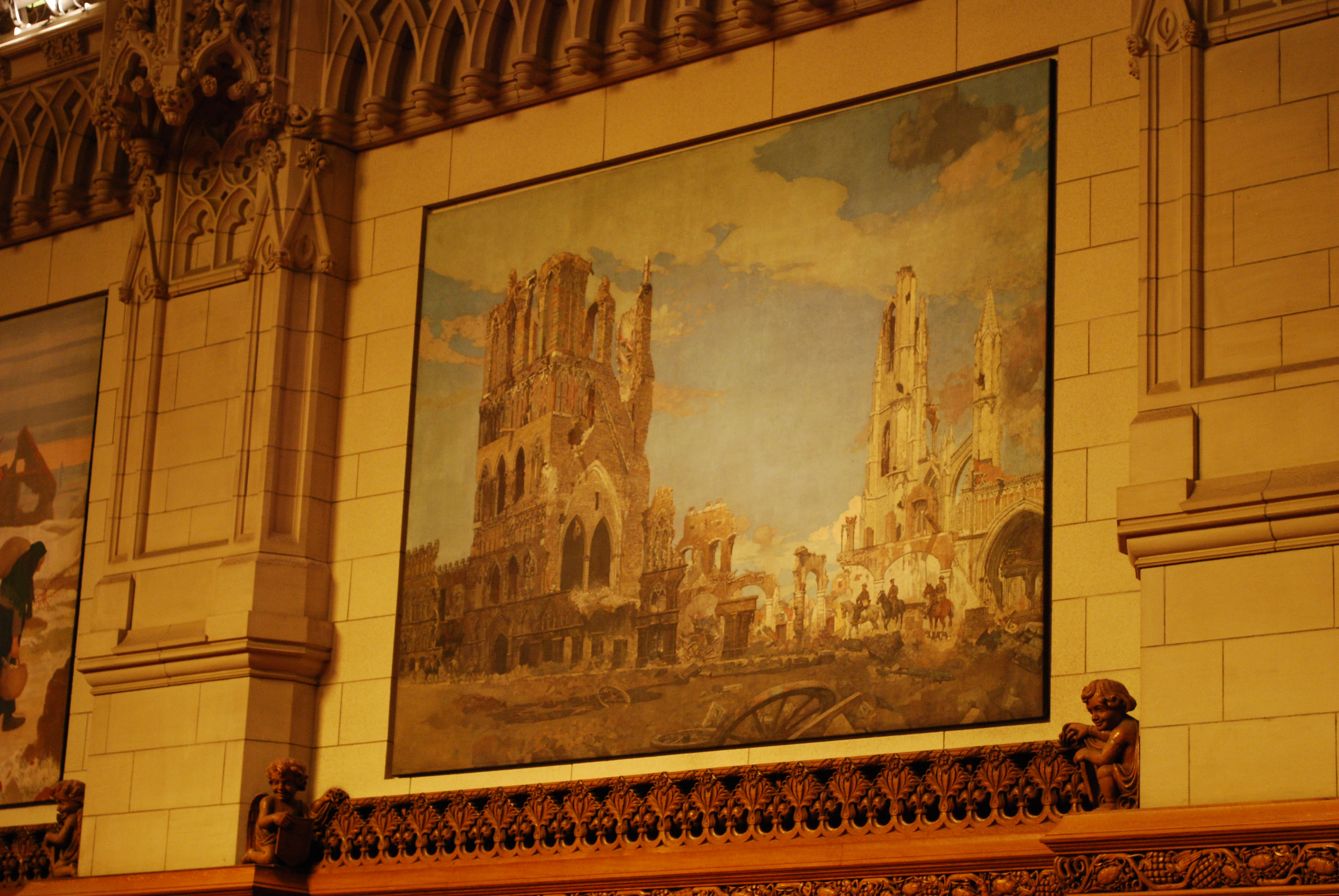
The Cloth Hall, Ypres by James Kerr-Lawson, one of eight murals placed on the walls of the Senate chamber

Edgar Bundy's Landing of the First Canadian Division at Saint-Nazaire, 1915, depicts the first landing of Canadian troops in France, at Saint-Nazaire, led off the Novian by the pipe band of the 13th Battalion (Royal Highlanders of Canada), CEF, and watched by officers, troops, and townspeople. Algernon Talmage painted A Mobile Veterinary Unit in France, showing a scene on the Cambrai front, where a Canadian Mobile Veterinary Unit is taking wounded horses to an evacuating station. Railway Construction in France was painted by Leonard Richmond to show the construction of a railway by the Canadian Overseas Railway Construction Corps in the deepest trench in France. James Kerr-Lawson was commissioned by the Canadian War Memorials Fund to create both Arras, the Dead City—which depicts the ruins of Arras Cathedral as they were in 1917—and The Cloth Hall, Ypres, a painting of the destroyed, 600-year-old Cloth Hall in Ypres. Claire Atwood's On Leave documents (as battlefield scenes were thought inappropriate subject matter for female artists) the home front activities of the Canadian Expeditionary Force at a YMCA canteen in one of London's train stations as they await their train to the battlefront. The Watch on the Rhine (The Last Phase) was painted by Sir William Rothenstein to symbolically represent the defeat of Germany, with a British howitzer facing across the Rhine, and old and new Germany embodied in the ancient hills and factory chimney. And Sir George Clausen's Returning to the Reconquered Land was painted to illustrate agricultural land behind the front lines in France and shows people returning to their destroyed homes following the armistice.

=== Senate foyer ===
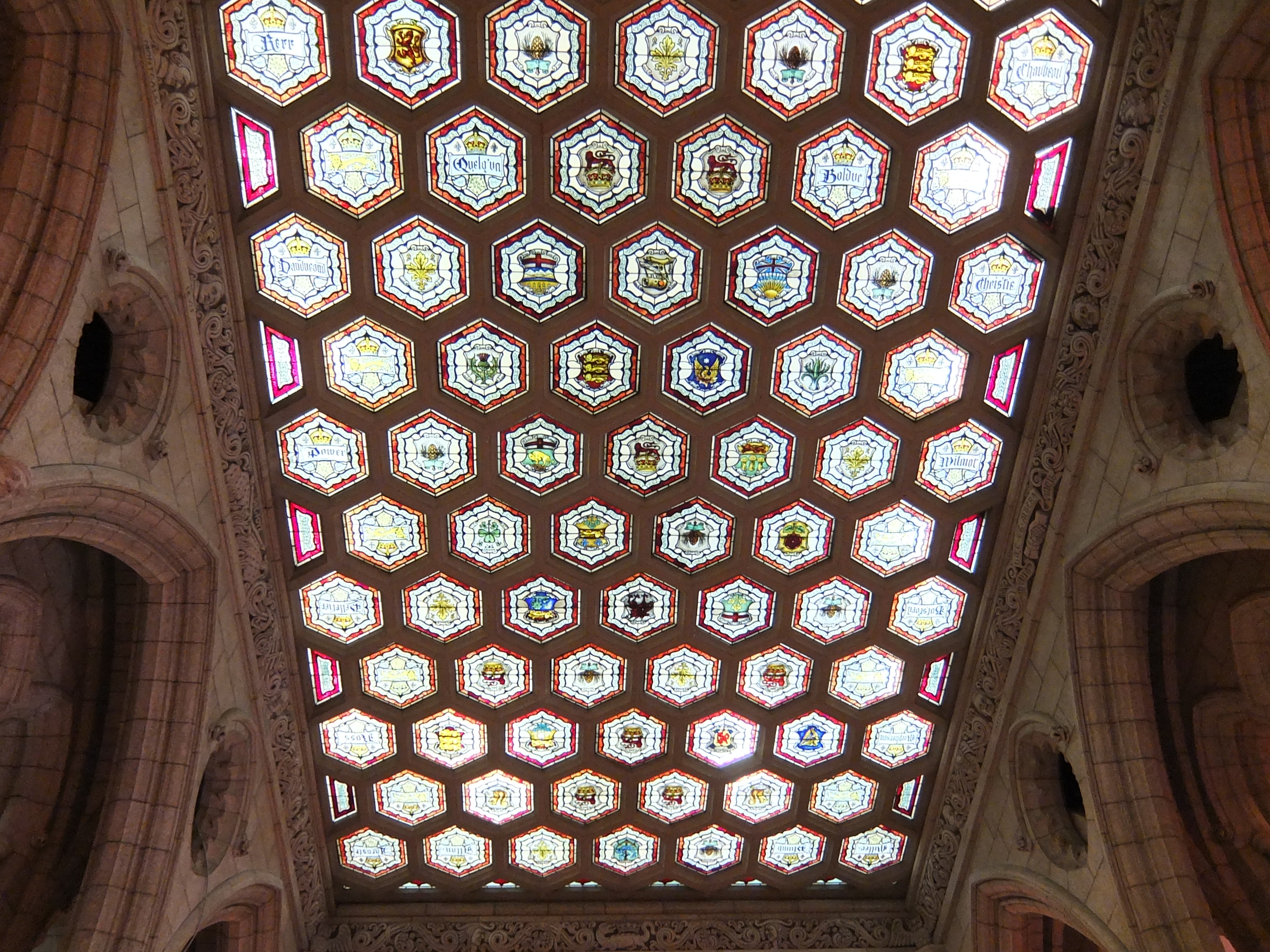
The Senate foyer ceiling, made in a Tudor-style stone tracery filled with stained glass.

To the Senate's immediate south is that room's foyer, a double-height space surrounded by a double-layered colonnade, the inside ring of attached shaft columns rising to the ceiling and the outside ring of rose coloured limestone columns supporting a second-floor gallery. Within the stonework are sculpted depictions of important figures in pre-Confederation Canada, as well as self-portraits of the sculptors who fashioned the stone. A number are dedicated as the Sovereigns' Arches, with corbels sculpted into depictions of Canada's monarchs; the latest addition being that of Queen Elizabeth II, unveiled on 9 December 2010. The entire ceiling is of a Tudor-style stone tracery filled with stained glass depicting royal emblems, such as provincial coats of arms, as well as symbols of First Nations and the names of all the speakers of the Senate up until the ceiling's installation in 1920.

Above the exterior entrance into the foyer is a stained glass window commemorating the Diamond Jubilee of Queen Elizabeth II. Designed by Christopher Goodman and Angela Zissoff of Kelowna, British Columbia, with input from the Speaker of the Senate, Noël A. Kinsella, and the Canadian Secretary to the Queen and Usher of the Black Rod, Kevin MacLeod, and approved by the Queen, the window shows Elizabeth and Queen Victoria with their respective royal cyphers and renditions of the Centre Block during the reign of each monarch. A gift to the monarch from the Senate, it was constructed over six weeks from 500 pieces of machine-made and mouth-blown glass from France, the United Kingdom, Germany, and the United States. The Queen unveiled a model at Rideau Hall on 30 June 2011 and, after the finished piece's installation, the window was dedicated by Governor General David Johnston on 7 February 2012.

The foyer walls bear portraits of Canada's past monarchs. The portrait of Queen Victoria by John Partridge has notably been rescued four times from fire, while others were added after the new Centre Block was built.

=== Commons chamber ===
The building's western wing contains the House of Commons chamber, along with its antechamber and lobbies for the government and opposition, on the east and west sides of the main commons space. The doors to all are of white oak trimmed with hand-wrought iron.

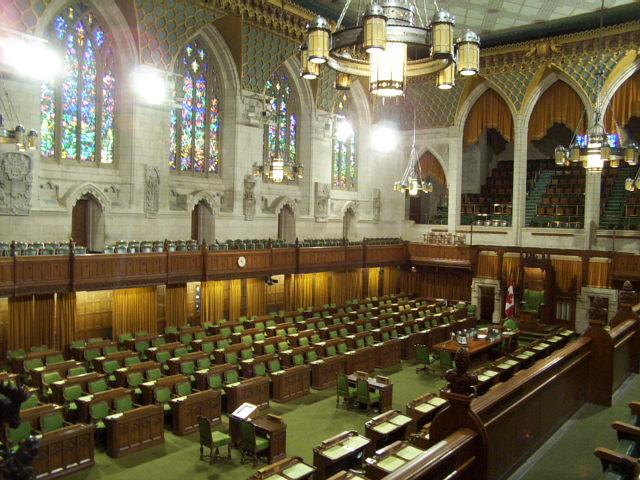
The Commons chamber in 2003. Much of the Commons chamber's upholstery is green.

The chamber is 21 metres long, 16 metres wide, and has seats for 320 members of parliament and 580 persons in the upper gallery that runs around the room's second level. The overall colour scheme is in green—visible in the carpeting, bench upholstery, draperies, paint within the gilded honeycomb cork plaster work of the cove, and the stretched linen canvas over the ceiling—and is reflective of the colour used in the House of Commons of the United Kingdom since at least 1663. That canvas, sitting 14.7 m above the commons floor and designed in 1920 by the New York decorating firm Mack, Jenney and Tyler, is painted with the heraldic symbols of the Canadian, provincial, and territorial coats of arms, with medallions at the intersections of diagonal stencilled bands in an argyle pattern. Running below this, and above the cove, is a continuous gold leaf cornice created in 1919 by Ferdinand Anthony Leonard Cerracchio (1888–1964), which displays a row of gilt figures, broken at the peak of each pointed arch by cherubs holding a cartouche, and behind all of which runs a painted grapevine with Tudor roses.

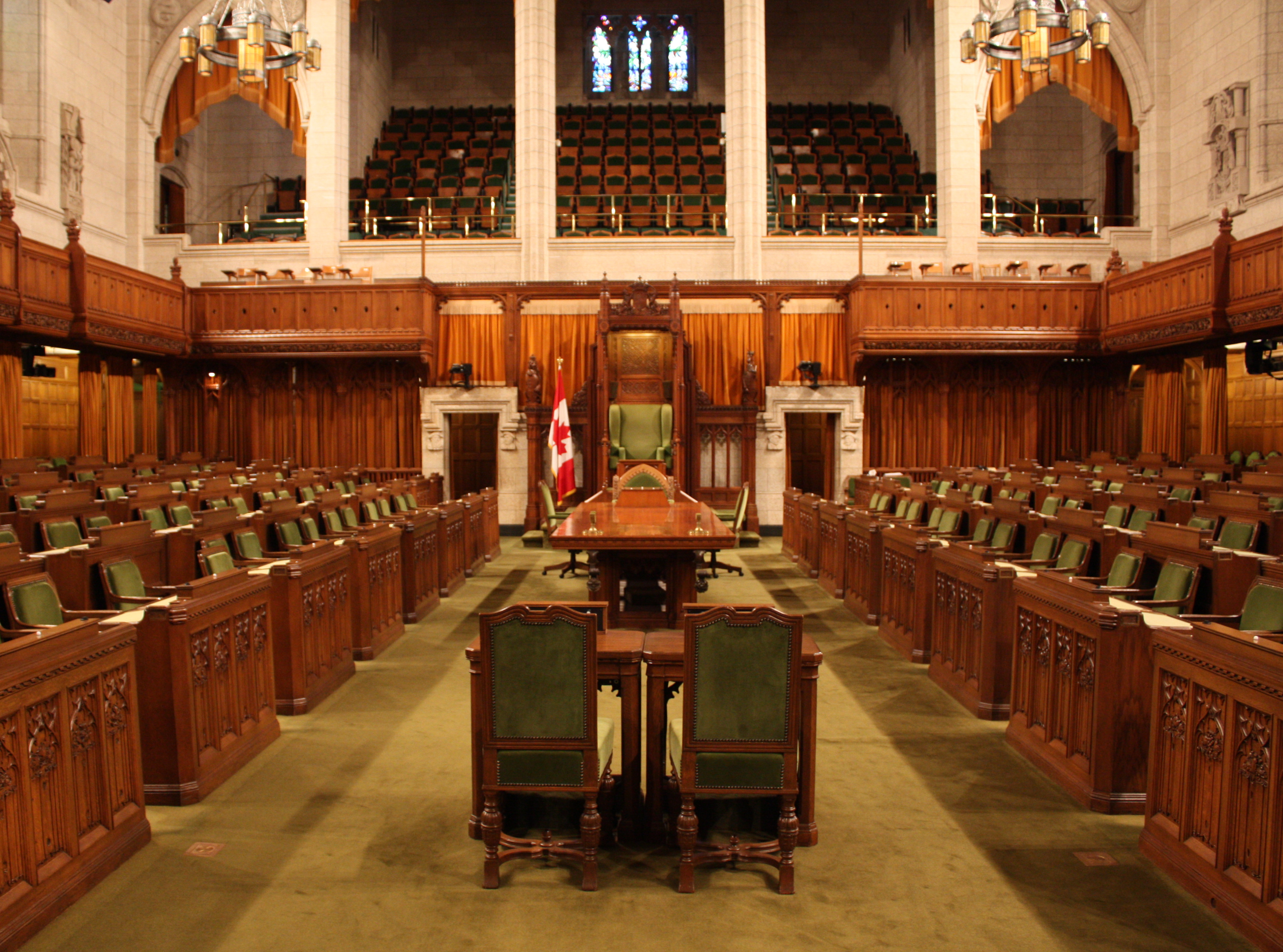
The benches for the members of parliament are spaced 3.96 metres (13.0 ft) apart from one another, with the speaker of the House of Commons seated between the two sides.

On the floor, the opposing members' benches are spaced 3.96 m apart on either side of the room, a measurement said to be equivalent to two swords' length, harkening back to when English members of parliament carried swords into the chamber. Directly between, directly opposite the main door, on the chamber's axis, is the speaker's chair, made in 1921 by the English firm of Harry Hems as an exact replica of that in the British House of Commons. It is topped by a carved wood canopy bearing a rendition of the royal coat of arms of Canada sculpted in wood from the roof of the Westminster Hall, which was built in 1397; the whole was a gift from the British branch of what is today the Commonwealth Parliamentary Association. The chair has since been augmented with a hydraulic lift, lighting, writing surfaces, and, at the foot of the chair, a television screen and computer screen to aid the speaker in monitoring the process of the house. Behind the chair is a door that gives the speaker access to the speaker's corridor, which links the commons chamber to the speaker's chambers, and which is lined with portraits of past speakers of the House of Commons.

In the commons chamber's east and west walls are 12 windows topped by pointed arches with hood moulds terminated by pendant drops. The glazing within is stained glass, commissioned as a Centennial Project in 1967 by then-speaker Lucien Lamoureux. Each window contains approximately 2,000 pieces of hand-blown glass—created in Ottawa by Russell C. Goodman using medieval techniques—arranged in a Decorated Gothic style pattern designed by R. Eleanor Milne. Divided into four sections by stone mullions, the upper parts contain geometrical tracery and provincial and territorial floral emblems amongst ferns; in the tracery at the head of the windows are symbols extracted from the coats of arms of the provinces and territories.

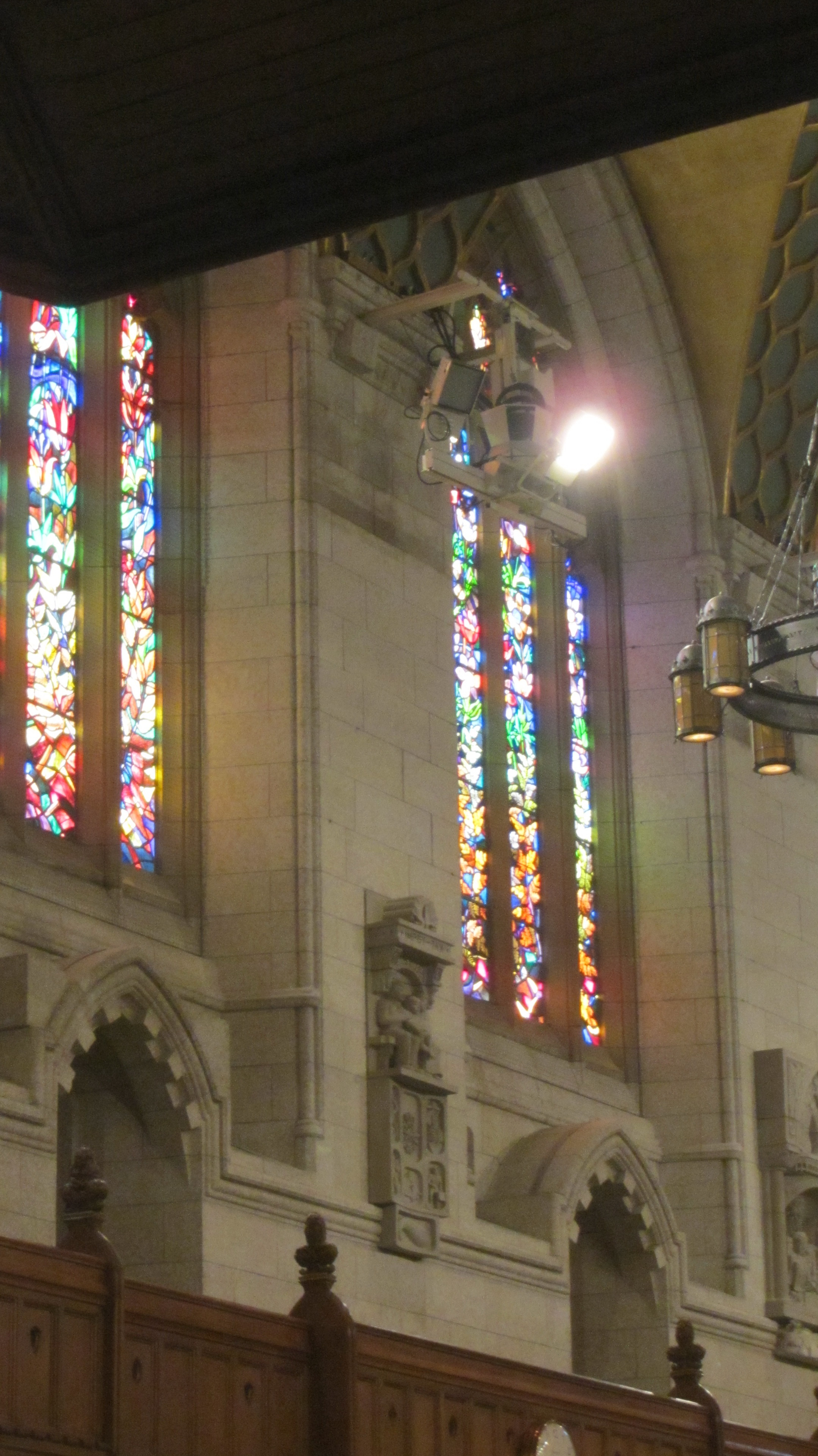
Twelve stained windows on the east and west walls of the Commons chamber.

As with other areas of the Centre Block, the commons walls are enriched with shafts, blind tracery, friezes, and a sculpture programme. The room was the last space in the building to be carved, with sculptural work only beginning in the late 1950s and continuing intermittently for the following two decades; approximately 225 blocks of varying sizes still remain uncarved. Amongst the work done are three series of stone works: The British North America Act, a set of 12 high reliefs on the east and west walls of the chamber, carved between 1978 and 1985, and illustrating through symbols and narrative themes associated with the federal and provincial responsibilities laid out in the British North America Act; Evolution of Life, a series of 14 sculptures within the spandrels of the pier-arches at the north and south ends of the House of Commons, depicting Canada's palaeontological past and the evolution of humanity through philosophy, science, and the imagination; and Speakers and Clerks, comprising four heads carved on the jambs of the two doors on either side of the Speaker's chair, depicting the speakers and clerks of the House of Commons at the time of the opening of both parliament buildings in 1867 and 1920, respectively.

With the closure of Centre Block for renovations in December 2018, the Commons chamber was relocated to the nearby West Block.

=== Commons foyer ===
Directly south of the House of Commons is that room's foyer, a rectangular, two storey arcaded hall surrounded by clustered limestone piers and moulded arches that support an upper cloister lined with black marble posts. The foyer is approached from Confederation Hall by the South Corridor, which is lined with portraits of former prime ministers, as well as via an entrance hall that opens to the front of the Centre Block and which is separated from the foyer by a Rose Tavernelle marble balustrade. The floor of the commons foyer is of Missisquoi Boulder Grey marble with borders of Verde Antique serpentine.

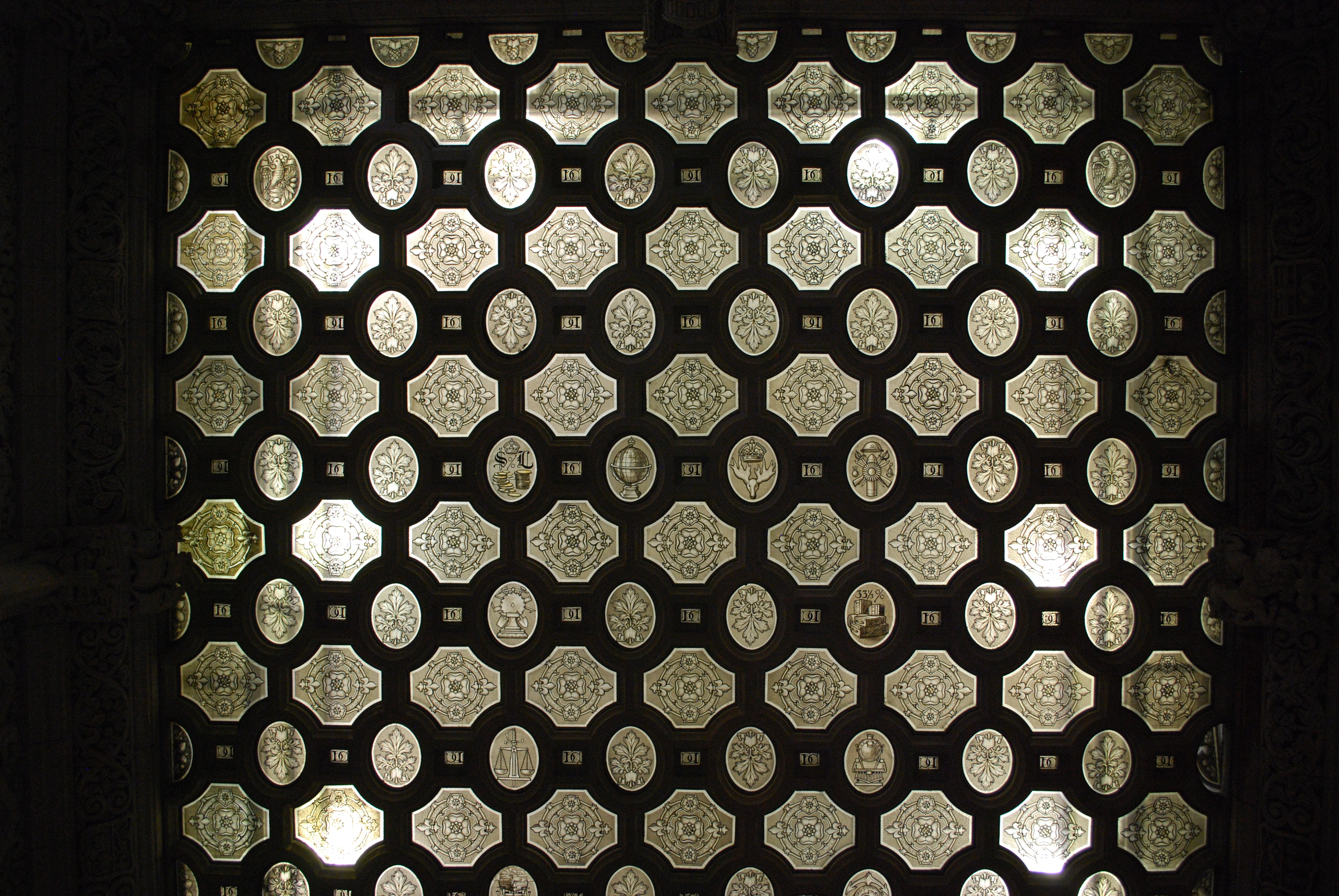
The ceiling of the House of Commons foyer

The walls bear a series of 10 bas-relief panels showing 25,000 years of Canada's history and, directly above, is a stone tracery ceiling with soft green coloured glass infill manufactured by the N.T. Lyon Glass Company of Toronto. The ceiling's appearance is similar to that found in the Senate foyer, except here the borders are of oak leaves, pine cones, and acorns; the octagonal panels are filled with Tudor roses and fleur-de-lis; the monogram HC (for House of Commons) is placed in all the small oblong panels; and the oval panels bear symbols of the various government departments amid sprigs of maple leaves: a steam crane represents Public Works; a beaver and bees represent trade and industry; a lighthouse and ship represent the naval services and a military ship at sea represents the overseas military; letters, stamps, and caduceus represent the Postmaster General; fish and an anchor represent the fisheries; wheat and a sickle represent agriculture; pounds and dollars represent finance; a crowned globe represents the Geological Survey; a moose and crown represents the Ministry of the Interior; a helmet and weapons represent militia and defence; crates and 33 1/3% represent customs; a steam locomotive represents the railway; a scale and sword represents justice; picks, shovels, and a saw represent mining and forestry; and a crown, mace, and the granting of Royal Assent represent parliament itself.

=== Other rooms ===
==== Railway Committee Room ====
The Railway Committee Room is to the east of and accessed from the Hall of Honour. It is a double-height space done in a Beaux-Arts style, with a heavily coffered ceiling and, above a one-storey-high ashlar stone base, pilasters on the walls—all the aforementioned painted in a cream colour—between which are panels of moss green fabric, except where there are windows on the east wall. In it hangs a reproduction of Robert Harris's painting The Fathers of Confederation, as well as a rendition of the Canadian Royal Arms and the Will Longstaff painting The Ghosts of Vimy Ridge which commemorates the Battle of Vimy Ridge.

It is used by the official Opposition party for meetings, as well as by various committees. The current room dates from 1916 and replaced the same that existed in the 1866 Centre Block and was named for the 166-member Railway Committee that once met in it. That space also served as home to the Supreme Court of Canada from 1876 to 1889.

==== Reading Room ====
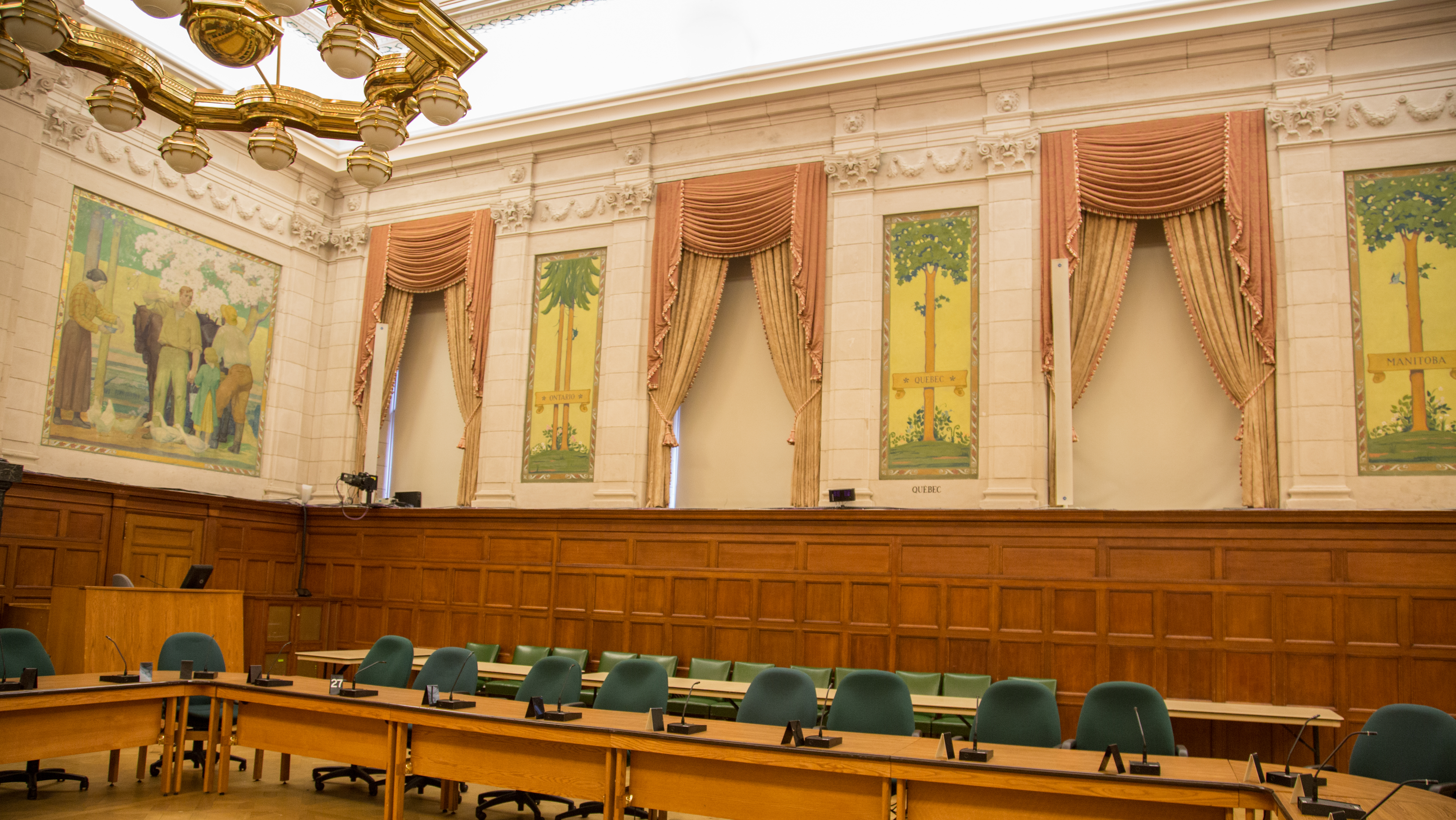
The Reading Room, designed in an Art Nouveau-style and where the governing caucus meets.

Directly across the Hall of Honour is the Reading Room, where the governing party's caucus meets. It is in a similar architectural style to the Railway Room, except between its pillasters are Art Nouveau murals.

==== Salon de la Francophonie ====
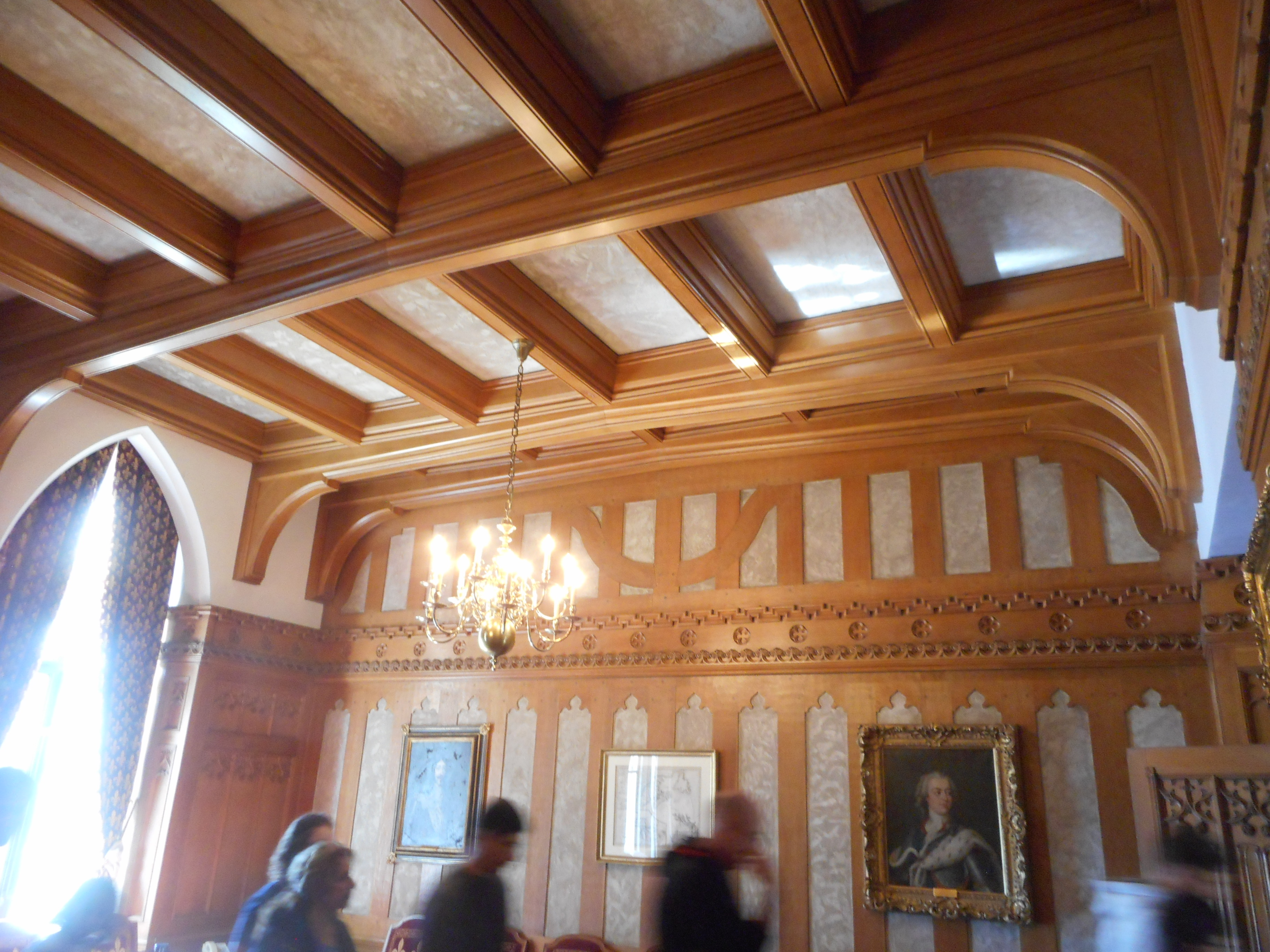
Salon de la Francophonie

On the Centre Block's east side, near the Senate foyer and used as a meeting room for senators, is the Salon de la Francophonie, dedicated to Canada's membership in the Organisation internationale de la Francophonie. The space is in a Tudor Gothic Revival style, with oak panelling carved with tracery, exposed wood beams, and textured plaster, as well as bosses carved into flowers, human faces, and gargoyles. A limestone fireplace is flanked by reading nooks with half-vaulted canopies.

It was originally used as a smoking room until, in 1992, the Canadian wing of the Assemblée parlementaire de la Francophonie proposed a commemoration of the country's place in la Francophonie. The following year, the Senate approved granting the room its present name. It is furnished with French emblems, such as fleurs-de-lis and portraits of French monarchs during the time of New France. There are also bronze busts of Samuel de Champlain and Senator Raoul Dandurand. The room is mirrored by the Commonwealth Room, the House of Commons' former smoking room.

== History ==
=== Construction ===
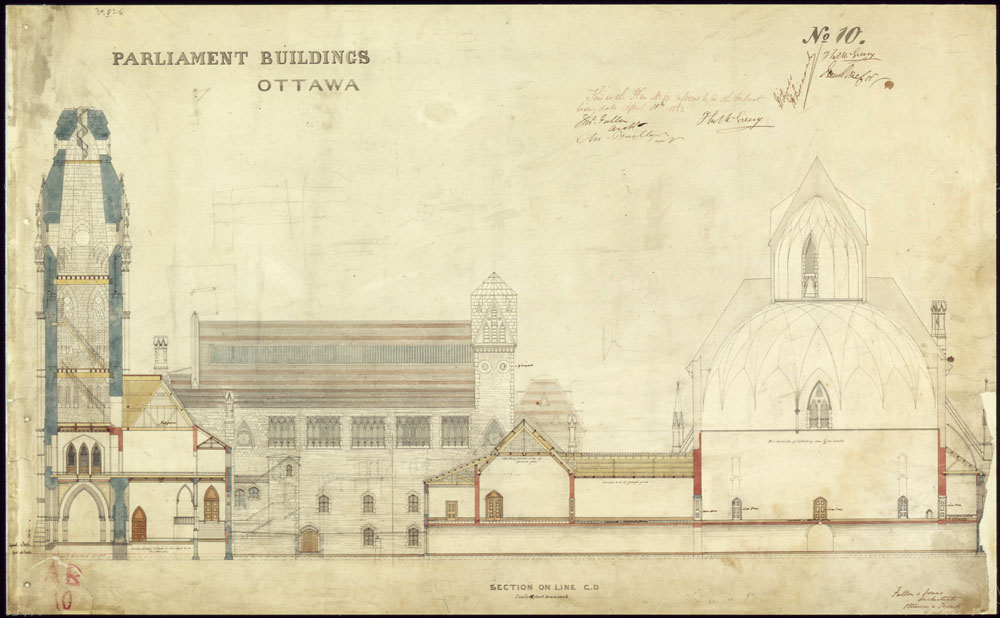
Draft depiction for the planned Centre Block from 1859

On 7 May 1859, the Department of Public Works for the Province of Canada sent a call for architects to submit proposals for the new parliament buildings to be erected on Barrack Hill. After the 298 submitted entries were narrowed down to three, Governor General Sir Edmund Walker Head was approached to break the stalemate, and the winner was announced on 29 August 1859. The Centre Block, departmental buildings, and a new residence for the governor general were each awarded separately, and the team of Thomas Fuller and Chilion Jones, under the pseudonym of Semper Paratus (Always Ready), won the prize for the first category with their Victorian High Gothic scheme with a formal, symmetrical front facing a quadrangle, and a more rustic, picturesque back facing the escarpment overlooking the Ottawa River.

The groundbreaking took place on 20 December 1859; however, workers soon hit bedrock, which, combined with a change to the design that saw the foundation moved to 17 feet deeper, meant costly blasting. Still, by 16 April of the following year, the first of the many coloured varieties of stone were laid – Nepean sandstone, red sandstone from Potsdam, New York, and a grey Ohio freestone. On 1 September 1860, Prince Albert Edward, Prince of Wales (later King Edward VII) arrived in Ottawa as part of his wider royal tour of the province, and laid the cornerstone of the growing Centre Block, with a luncheon on the grounds for the workers and their families. The Ottawa Citizen said on 6 June of the upcoming event:

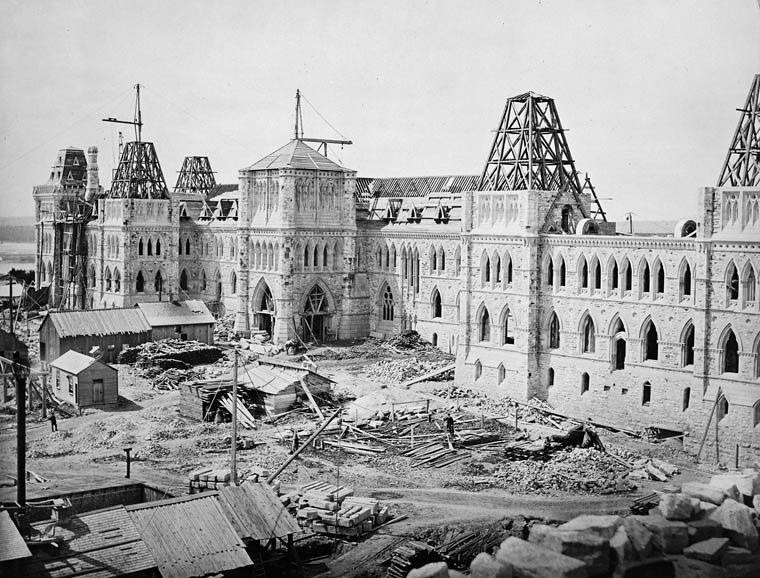
Construction of the Centre Block, 1863

[I]t will be the first occasion on which he will be publicly recognized as the Heir-Apparent and he will see in the demonstrations of the Canadians something of a political rather than of a personal and individual character[...] in after, when he occupies a more elevated position he will gratefully remember that his 'first appearance' as the representative of sovereign power and the warmth of feeling evinced towards him will make him more disposed to redress any grievances of the Canadians and more anxious to give his support to measures calculated to promote the prosperity of that country.

By 1866, the United Province of Canada's parliament (Legislative Assembly of the Province of Canada and Legislative Council of the Province of Canada) sat in its first and only session in the new building, by then dominated by the central Victoria Tower on the formal front, and with an articulated rear façade shaped along the curves of the adjacent cliff. The stonework contained carved mouldings, sculpted foliage, real and mythical animals, grotesques, and emblems of France, England, Ireland, and Scotland, spread across and over pointed windows in various groupings, turrets, towers, and finials, while the roof was of grey and green slate, topped with iron cresting painted china blue with gilt tips. Beautiful as the building was, the final tallies of the costs showed the original budget had been far surpassed, with the total price of the Centre Block being $1,373,633, at 1866 rates, when $1,093,500 had originally been allocated for the construction of the entire parliamentary precinct.

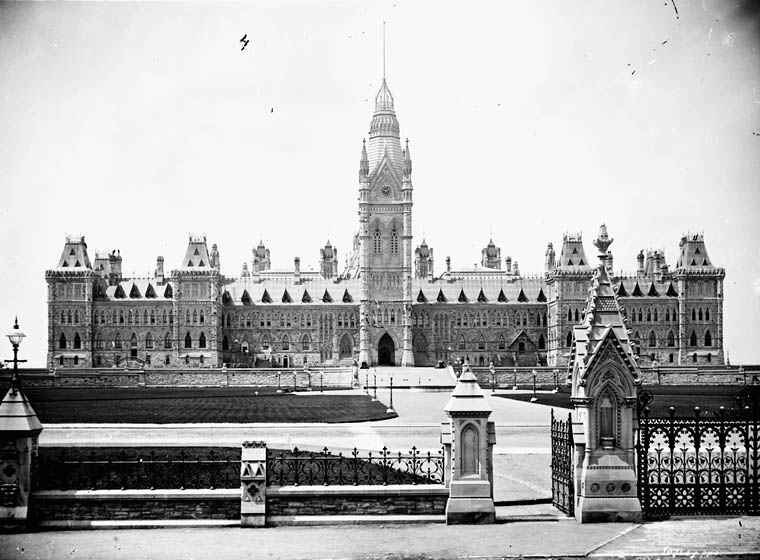
The original Centre Block, c. 1877 to 1880

On 1 July 1867, the Dominion of Canada was formed, with Ottawa as the capital, and the houses of parliament the legislature, for a larger territory than for which they had originally been built; within four years, the Dominion stretched from the Atlantic to the Pacific Ocean. From 1906 to 1914, the Centre Block was expanded to suit the additional members of parliament and staff from the newly formed provinces of Alberta and Saskatchewan.

=== Great fire ===
A fire alarm was raised in the Centre Block on 3 February 1916, at 8:37 pm; something had been seen smouldering in a wastepaper basket in the Reading Room, but as that was not terribly unusual, a clerk was called to assist. However, by that point, the fire had progressed beyond control in the wood-panelled and paper-filled room. The House of Commons was in session that evening and was interrupted by the chief doorkeeper of the Commons calling for evacuation.

Some women in the gallery, unaware of the urgency, attempted to reclaim their fur coats from the coat check and perished. Others, meanwhile, formed a human chain to carry furniture, files, and artwork out of the burning structure; the portrait of Queen Victoria in the commons chamber was rescued from flames for the second time after the 1849 burning of the Parliament buildings in Montreal. Half an hour after the fire started came the first of five explosions, and, shortly after midnight, the large bell in the Victoria Tower crashed to the ground; it had tolled each hour until midnight, when, after ringing eleven times, it ceased to function. When the fire crews thought that the inferno had been quelled, flames emerged in the Senate chamber.

Within twelve hours, the building was completely destroyed, except for the Library of Parliament, spared by the closing of its heavy metal doors. Bowman Brown Law was the only member of parliament who died in the fire, bringing the total to 7. The Cabinet immediately moved to meet at the nearby Château Laurier hotel while parliament itself relocated to the Victoria Memorial Museum Building.

With the fire occurring during the First World War, rumours began to circulate a German arsonist had started the blaze, the Toronto Globe asserting that while the official cause of the fire was reported as a carelessly left cigar, "unofficial Ottawa, including many Members of Parliament, declare 'the Hun hath done this thing.'"

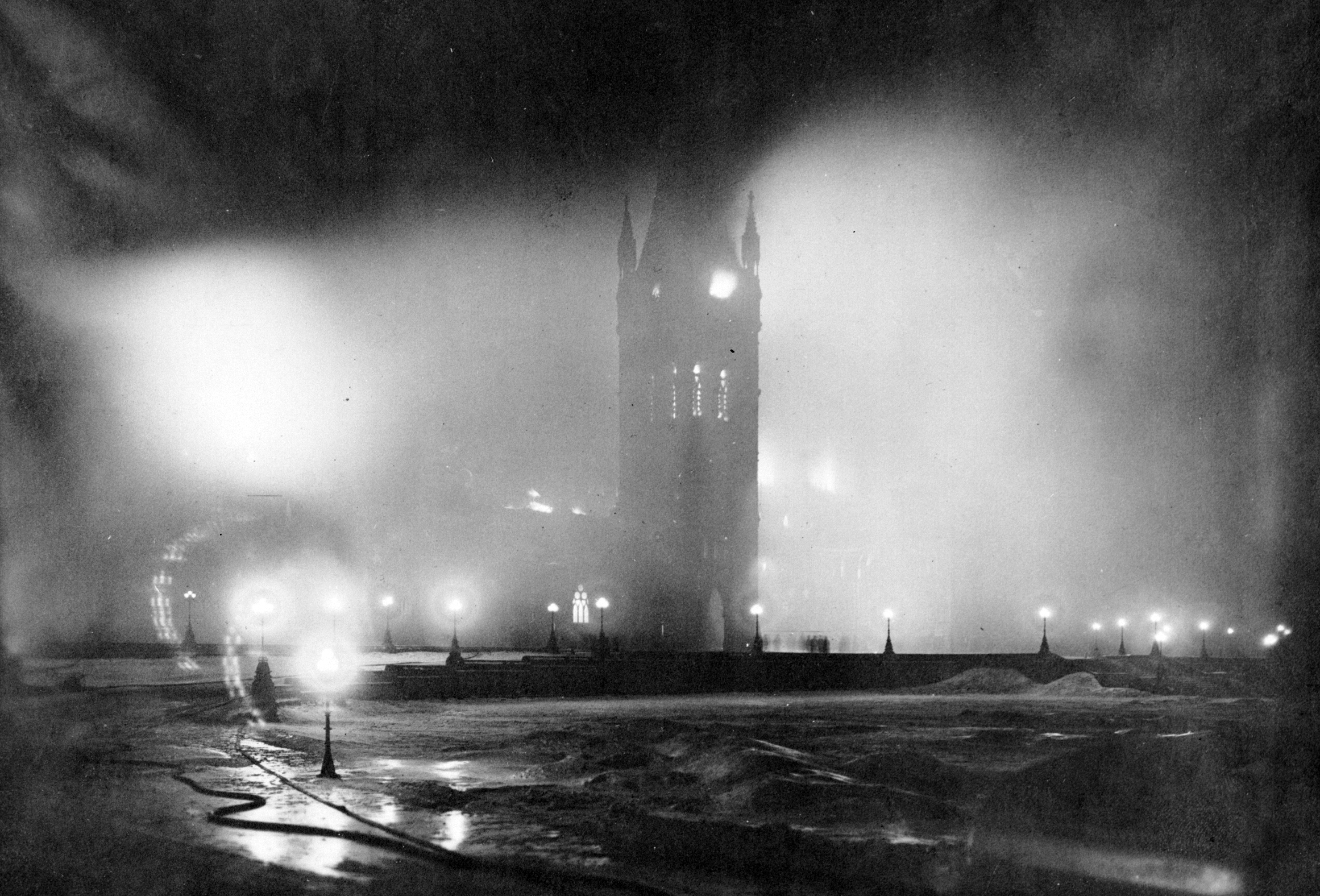
Centre Block ablaze in 1916

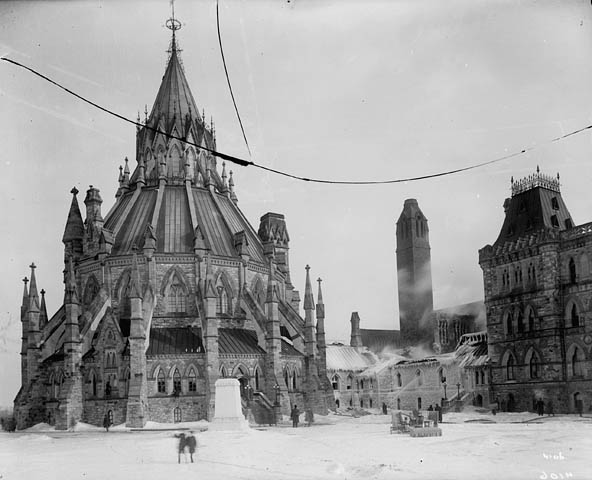
The Library of Parliament immediately after the fire.

=== Rebuilding ===
Reconstruction of the Centre Block began immediately, with a team of architects led by John A. Pearson and Jean-Omer Marchand overseeing a design much like the original, but expanded in size and pared down in ornament, more in keeping with the Beaux-Arts ethos of the time. By 1 September 1916, less than seven months after the fire, the original cornerstone was relaid by the then governor general, Prince Arthur, Duke of Connaught and Strathearn, exactly 56 years after his brother, the future King Edward VII, had done the same. The new building was to be constructed with a steel frame, and an interior predominantly finished in stone, as well as with a more logical layout and clear exiting strategy.

During the reconstruction, the House of Commons and Senate sat at the Victoria Memorial Museum Building.

On 26 January 1920, the first sitting of parliament in the new Centre Block was opened by Governor General the Duke of Devonshire. However, the ceremony was also exceptional for the fact that it took place in the House of Commons, rather than the Senate, as the latter had not yet been constructed. Similarly, the corridors and main chambers were still devoid of their decorative carvings, which would be completed over the ensuing fifty years, and it was not until Dominion Day of 1927 that the Peace Tower was dedicated by Governor General the Viscount Willingdon.

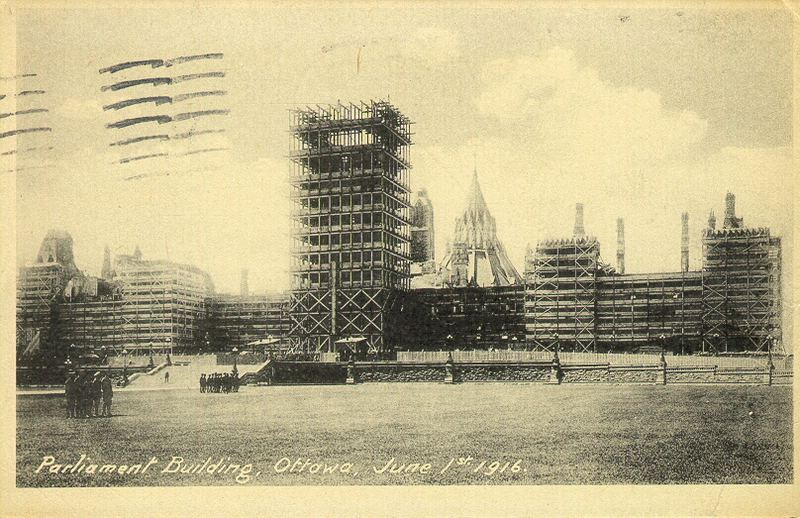
Centre Block under reconstruction in June 1916

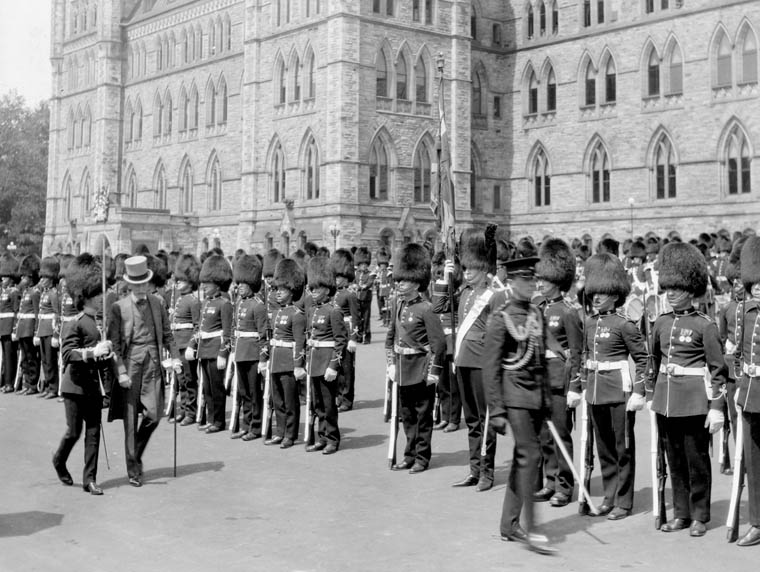
Governor General the Viscount Willingdon outside Centre Block for Dominion Day celebrations, 1927

=== Centre Block project ===
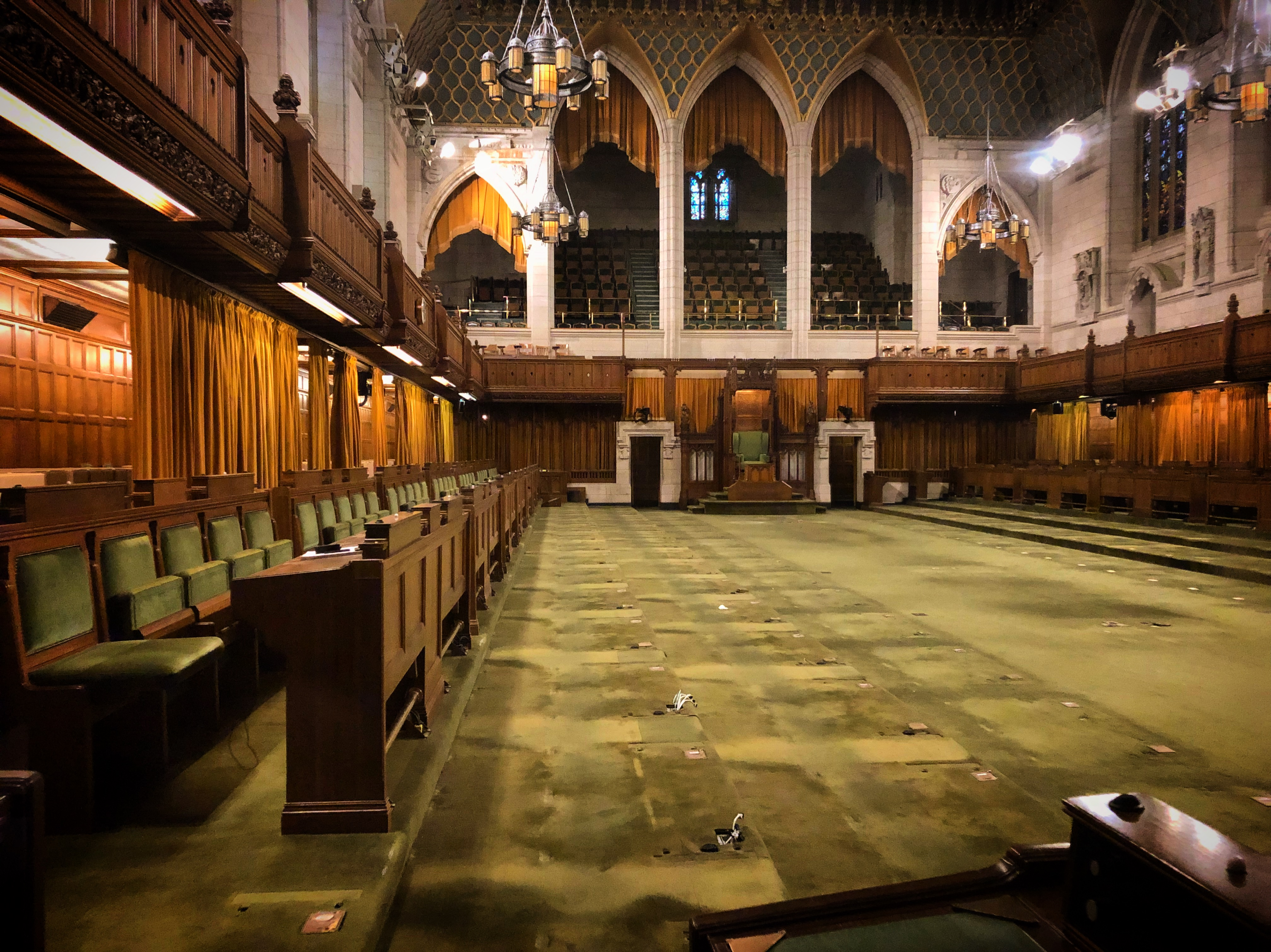
Stripped interior of the Commons chamber for the Parliament Hill Rehabilitation in 2018

By the 1990s, it was deemed necessary for an upgrade to be made to the Centre Block's mechanical and electrical systems, which would necessitate a new plant for these amenities. To avoid disturbing the building's heritage façades and spaces, as well as erecting new structures within the parliamentary precinct, the two storey, 50 m × 40 m (160 ft × 130 ft) square plant and new loading docks, called Centre Block Underground Services (CBUS), were constructed underground, seeing, in 1997, the removal of 25,000 m^{3} (883,000 cu ft) of rock from under and near the Centre Block.

Further upgrades have led to extensive internal renovations, including both parliamentary chambers and associated areas. As this would cause a multi-year disruption, plans were made to enclose the East and West blocks' courtyards for use as temporary legislative chambers while the Centre Block is out of commission. These plans were later changed, and the Senate chamber has been housed in the former Union Station, currently the Government Conference Centre, since 2019. Commons has occupied the West Block as previously arranged, after it was renovated from 2011 to 2019.

From 2018, MPs were moved from Centre Block for a decade-long renovation at a cost of over $4 billion set to be complete for 2031. Starting in spring 2020, excavators dug 23 metres into the bedrock with the plan of expanding the Parliament Welcome Centre to provide access for more visitors to Parliament Hill in a three-floor basement. The upgrade will also protect the site from an earthquake up to a 6.0 magnitude by adding 500 base isolators (shock absorbers). For the renovation, the 20,000 heritage assets and artifacts were removed, and parts of the building reduced to a shell. The project aims to restore the heritage of the building. In doing so, of the 400,000 stones supporting the Centre Block, approximately a third are being removed for repair or replacement. During parts of the renovation, a tarp named “trompe-l’œil” (trick of the eye) has been installed around the building to offer protection for workers and be aesthetically pleasing for visitors.

=== Security issues ===
On 18 May 1966, Paul Joseph Chartier killed himself as he left a Centre Block washroom by accidentally detonating the bomb he had been preparing to throw onto the floor of the House of Commons from the public galleries to, as he put it in his notes, "exterminate as many members as possible." The building's security was heightened; however, tests of this by journalism students that November proved the precautions had been little improved. Later, in 1989, Charles Yacoub hijacked a Greyhound Lines bus and drove it up onto Parliament Hill.

Several shooting incidents occurred on 22 October 2014 around Parliament Hill and in the Centre Block, primarily in the Hall of Honour. Michael Zehaf-Bibeau, after fatally shooting Corporal Nathan Cirillo, a soldier mounting the guard of honour at the National War Memorial, made his way to Parliament Hill and to the Centre Block. There, he engaged in a firefight with Sergeant-at-Arms of the House of Commons Kevin Vickers and members of the Royal Canadian Mounted Police, which ended when he was killed by RCMP Constable Curtis Barrett.

== Public access ==
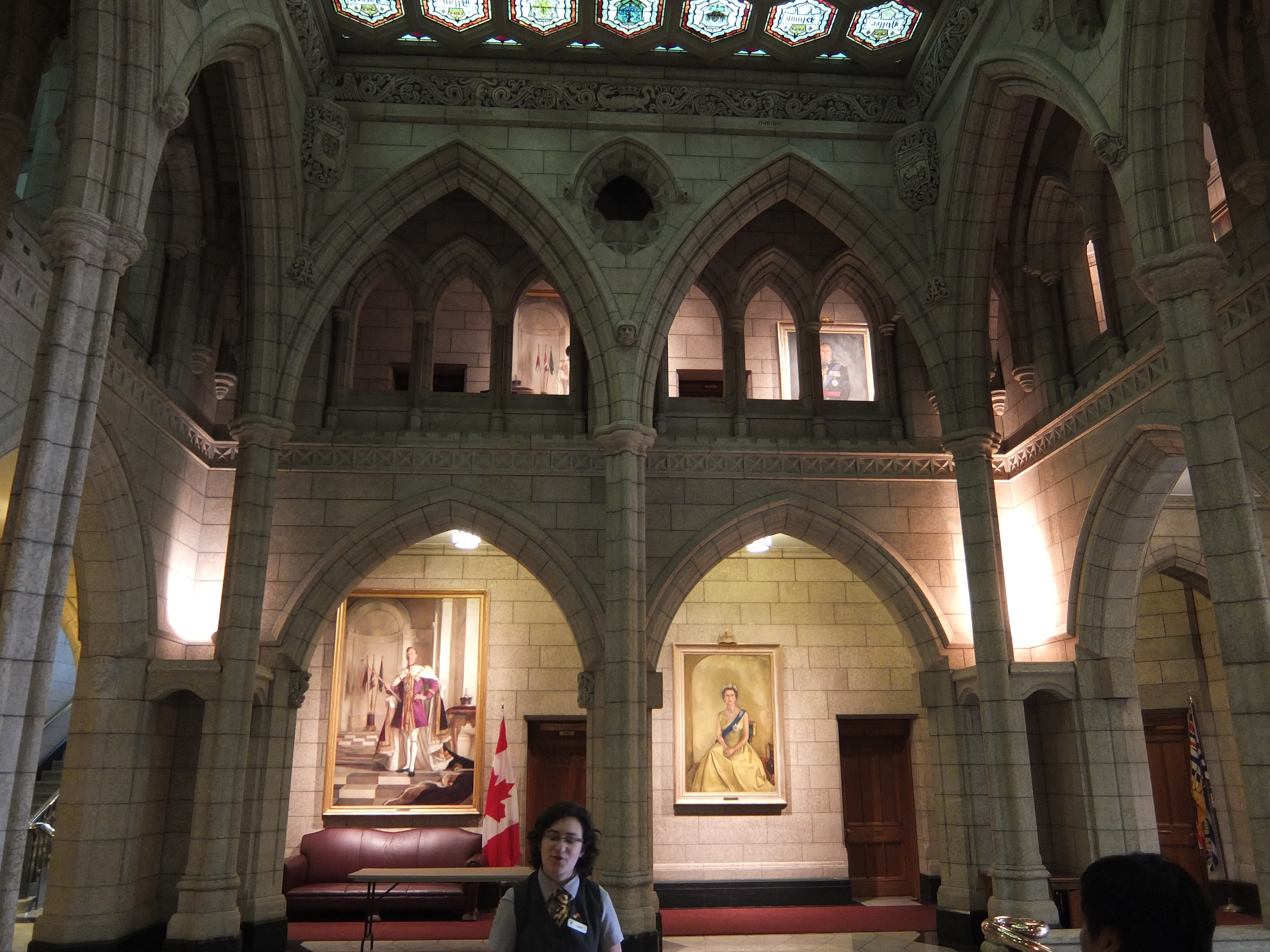
A tour guide waits for people to gather around her in the Senate foyer.

About 355,000 visitors tour the Centre Block each year. Guided, free daily tours are conducted year-round by the Library of Parliament and include an opportunity to visit the Peace Tower. Visitors are able to "discover the history, functions and art of Canada’s Parliament", and curriculum-based tours are available to school groups. The federal Crown is constructing an underground welcome centre, expected to open in June 2017. As of December 2017, all excavation is complete, and exterior construction started in May 2017. Finishing the face and interior work will signal the end of the project. The completion date has been set to the Fall of 2018 or earlier. The first phase, the Visitor Welcome Centre opened in January 2019. Construction is underway (as of October 2023) on the second phase of the project, the Parliament Welcome Centre, which will link the East, Centre, and West blocks into a single, interconnected complex. It is also expected to provide additional operating space for Parliament's activities.

== See also ==
- Legislative buildings of Canada
- List of legislative buildings
- List of portraits in the Centre Block
