= Eleanor Milne =

Canadian sculptor (1925–2014)

- Born: Rose Eleanor Milne; May 14, 1925; Saint John, New Brunswick, Canada
- Died: May 17, 2014 (aged 89); Ottawa, Ontario, Canada

Rose Eleanor Milne (May 14, 1925 – May 17, 2014) was a Canadian sculptor best known for her work as the Dominion Sculptor of Canada, a position that she held from 1961 until her retirement in 1993.

== Early life ==
Milne was born on May 14, 1925, in Saint John, New Brunswick. Her father, William Harold Milne, was a naval architect and her mother, Eleanor Mary Milne, was an artist. Milne struggled to learn how to read as a child as a result of dyslexia.

At the age of 11 she moved with her family to Montreal. She studied at the School of the Museum of Fine Arts in Montreal, where her instructors included Arthur Lismer and Jacques de Tonnancour, among others; she earned her degree in 1945. She next studied human anatomy at McGill University School of Medicine. Further study followed under John Farleigh at the Central School of Arts and Crafts in London, England. Milne also studied wood sculpture under Sylvia Daoust at the École des beaux-arts de Montréal, and apprenticed for a time under Ivan Meštrović.

== Career ==
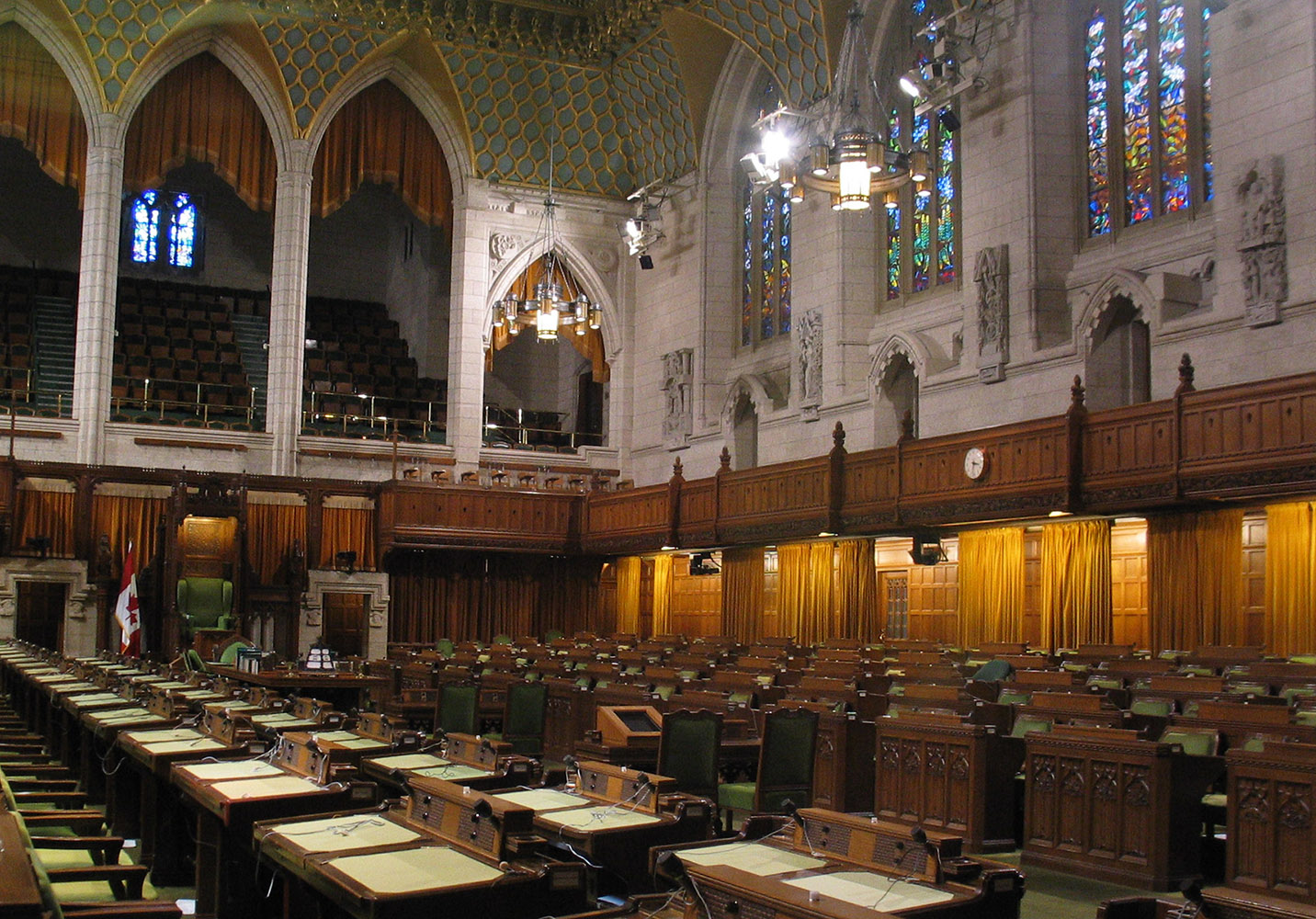
House of Commons Chamber with three of Milne's twelve completed stained glass windows visible at right.

In 1961 Milne was appointed Dominion Sculptor of Canada. The first woman to hold the position, she was selected over nearly 20 other applicants. During her career, which lasted until her retirement in 1993, she completed for the Centre Block of the Parliament of Canada a cycle of twelve stained-glass windows depicting the floral emblems of Canada's provinces and territories. She oversaw the restoration of the ceiling in the House of Commons, and carved a 120-foot long frieze depicting the history of Canada until World War I, which was carved on site between 1962 and 1974.

Although Milne was required to work within a Gothic Revival framework, she worked to incorporate elements of Canadian history that went beyond stereotypical symbols like maple leaves or beavers. As Sandra Alfoldy explains: "In Milne's realistic approach to Canada's history, bored monarchs and exhausted explorers are bound in with the social injustices behind the founding of the country." She points to the narratives depicted in Milne's piece "History of Canada Frieze" which depicts the expulsion of Acadians in 1755 and positions Indigenous peoples as strong and positive social players as an example.

In her role as Dominion Sculptor Milne created work for other government organizations as well, including the chair used by the speaker of the council of the Northwest Territories. At her retirement she was succeeded by Maurice Joanisse, who had begun his career as a carver under her tutelage.

Milne also published wood engravings and illustrated books during her career. Later in life the art of carving became difficult for her, and she taught herself instead to create art using a computer. She was a member of the Order of Canada, to which she was named in 1988.

Milne died at her Ottawa home on May 17, 2014.
