= Leonard Richmond =

Leonard Richmond (1889-1965) was a Somerset born British painter and war artist who spent a large part of his career in Canada and was noted for his railway posters.

== Biography ==
During World War I Richmond served as an official war artist for Canada. In the 1920s and 1930s he produced posters promoting the Canadian Pacific Railway plus the Southern and Great Western Railways in Britain. Richmond was awarded several prizes including the Tuthill Prize (1928) at the Chicago International Watercolour Exhibition and a silver medal (1947) at the Paris Salon. Examples of his pictures are held by several public collections in Britain including: The British Museum; All Souls College, Oxford; the National Railway Museum; The National Trust (Cliveden); Newport Museum and Art Gallery; and Penlee House Gallery and Museum.

== Selected publications ==
- Richmond, L. (1969). The technique of oil painting. London: Pitman.
- Richmond, L. (1966). From the sketch to the finished picture: Oil painting. London: Pitman.
- Richmond, L., Bell, V., Nash, P., Kauffer, E. M. K., & Friday Club (London, England). (1933). The technique of the poster. London: Sir Isaac Pittman & Sons Ltd.
- Richmond, L. (1966). The art of landscape painting. Pitman.

== Gallery ==
Images of Richmond's work:

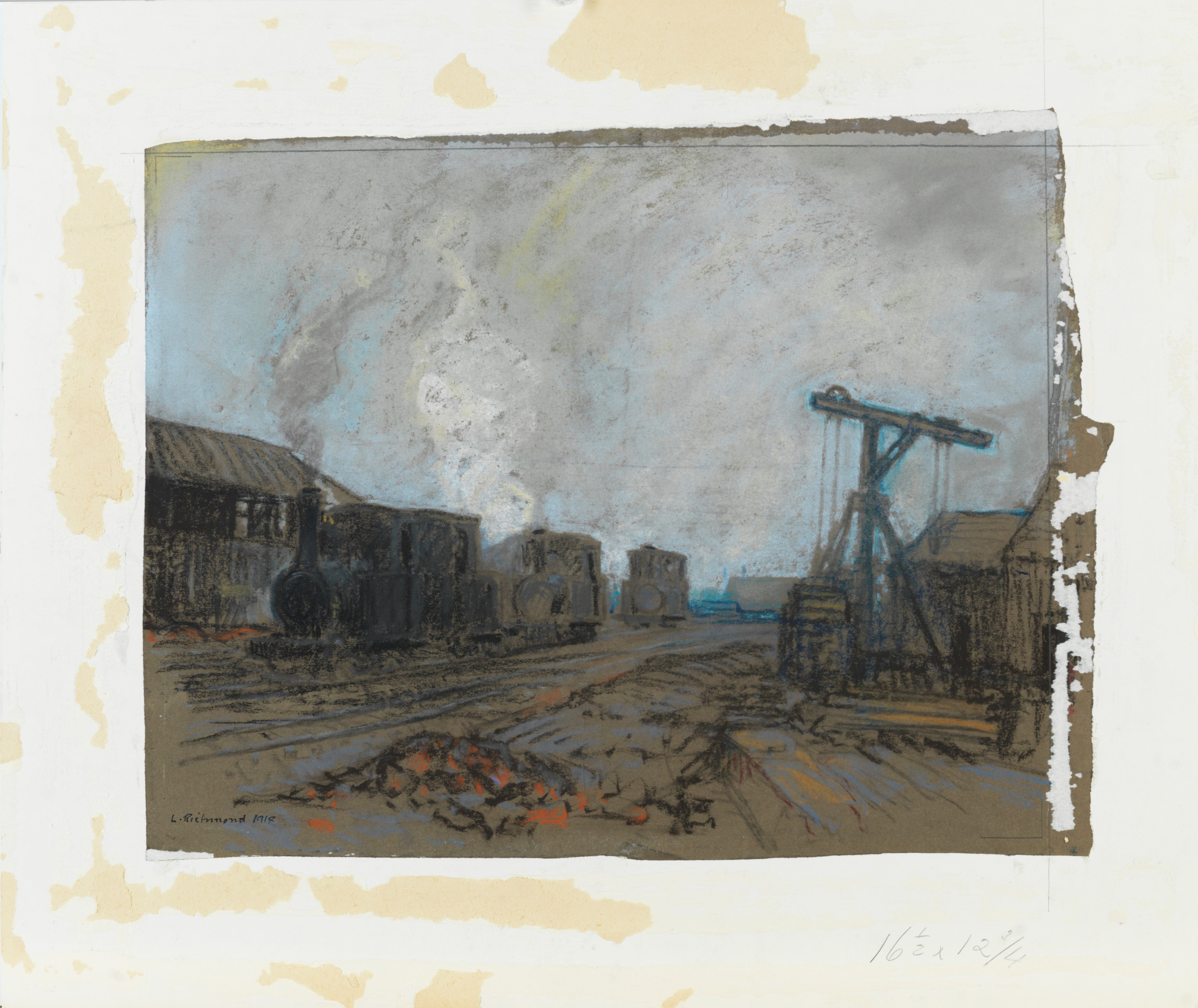
Canadian Light Railway Engines

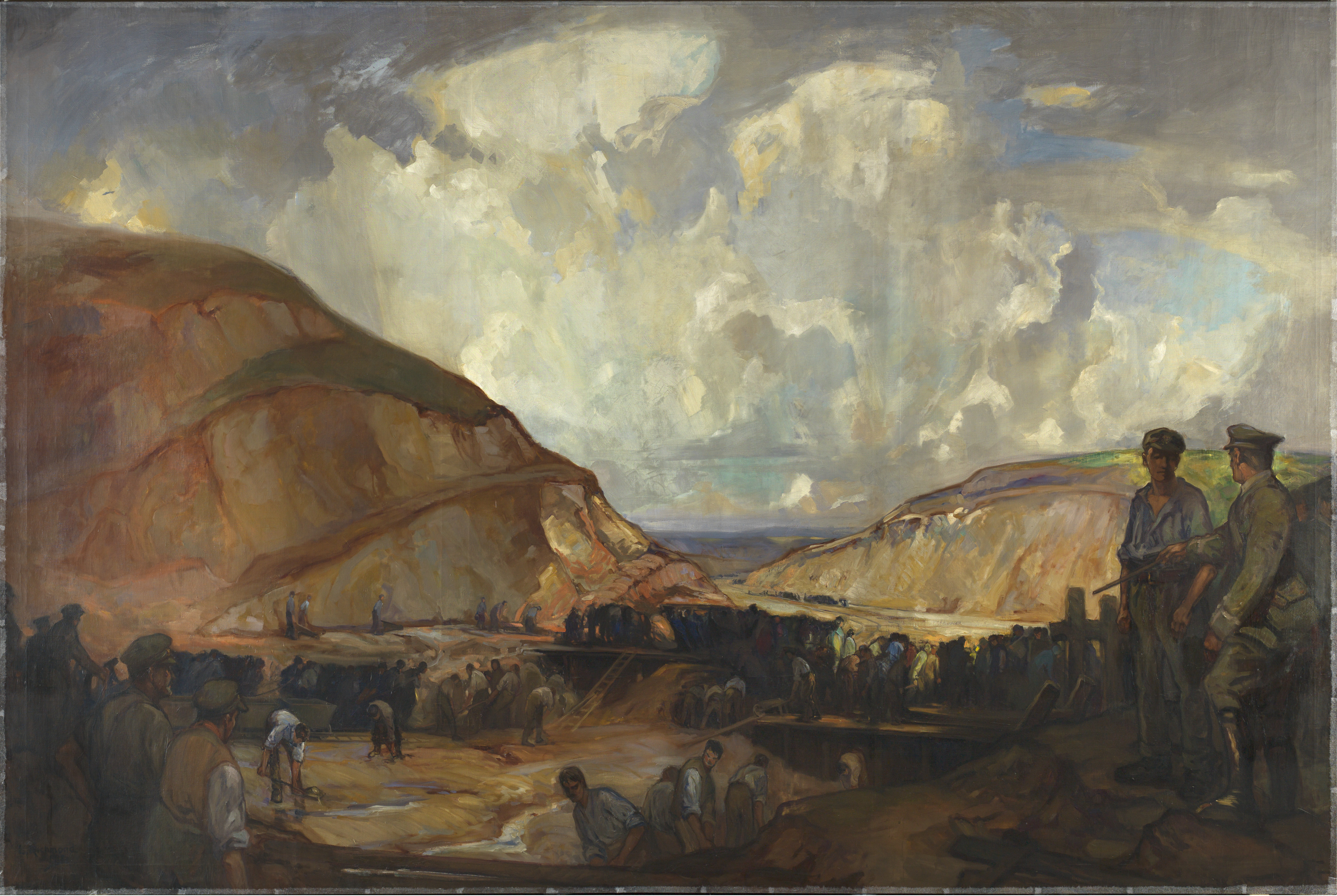
Canadian Railway Construction in France
