= West Block =

Building on Parliament Hill in Ottawa, Ontario, Canada

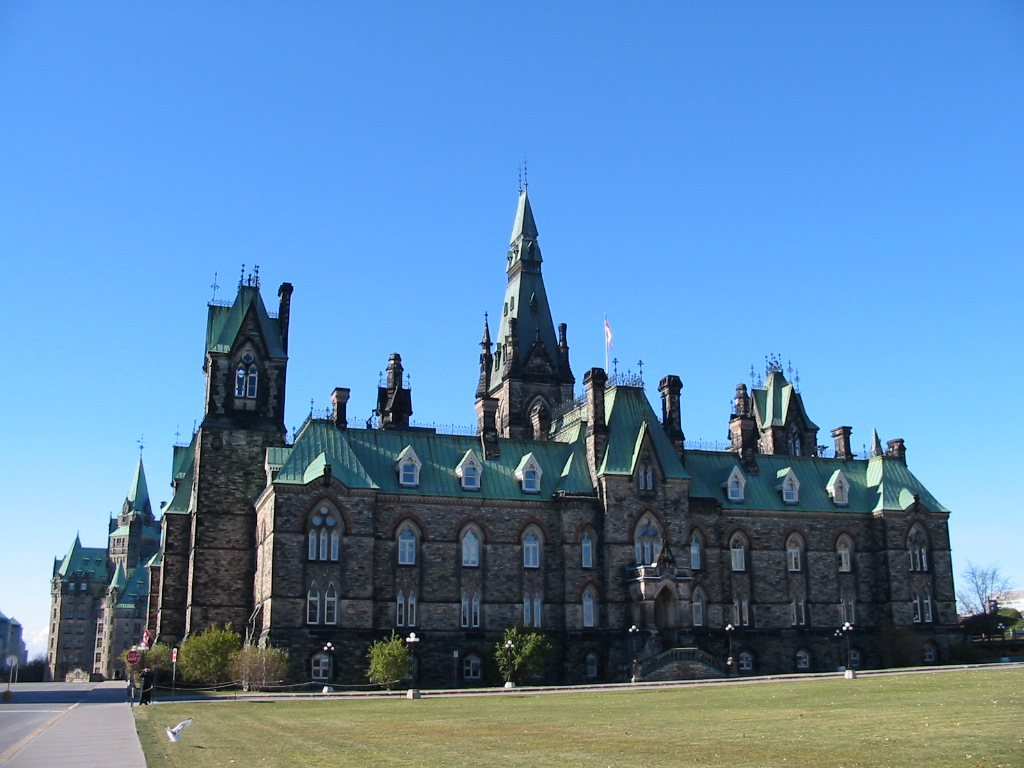
- West Block in 2002
- Interactive map of the West Block area

General information
- Architectural style: Victorian High Gothic
- Location: Ottawa, Ontario, Canada
- Coordinates: 45.4232°N 75.7005°W
- Construction started: 1859
- Completed: 1865: main building; 1878: Mackenzie Tower; 1906: Laurier Tower
- Owner: The King in Right of Canada

Technical details
- Structural system: Load bearing masonry construction

Design and construction
- Architects: Thomas Stent and Augustus Laver

The West Block (officially the Western Departmental Building; French: Édifice administratif de l'ouest) is one of the three buildings on Parliament Hill, in Ottawa, Ontario. Since 28 January 2019, it has housed the interim House of Commons Chamber, installed to accommodate the House while the Centre Block is closed. The West Block also houses offices for parliamentarians, a branch of the Library of Parliament, committee rooms, and some preserved pre-Confederation spaces.

Built in the Victorian High Gothic style, the West Block has been extended twice since its original completion in 1865. Though not as renowned as the Centre Block of parliament, the West Block appears on the obverse of the Canadian five-dollar bill.

== Characteristics ==
Designed by Thomas Stent and Augustus Laver, the West Block is an asymmetrical structure built in the Victorian High Gothic style, with load-bearing masonry walls, all clad in a rustic Nepean sandstone exterior and dressed stone trim around windows and other edges, as well as displaying a multitude of stone carvings, including gargoyles, grotesques, and friezes, keeping with the style of the rest of the parliamentary complex. The West Block adds to the Ottawa skyline three prominent towers: the Mackenzie Tower (added in 1878), the Laurier Tower (added in 1906), and the Southwest Tower.

== History ==
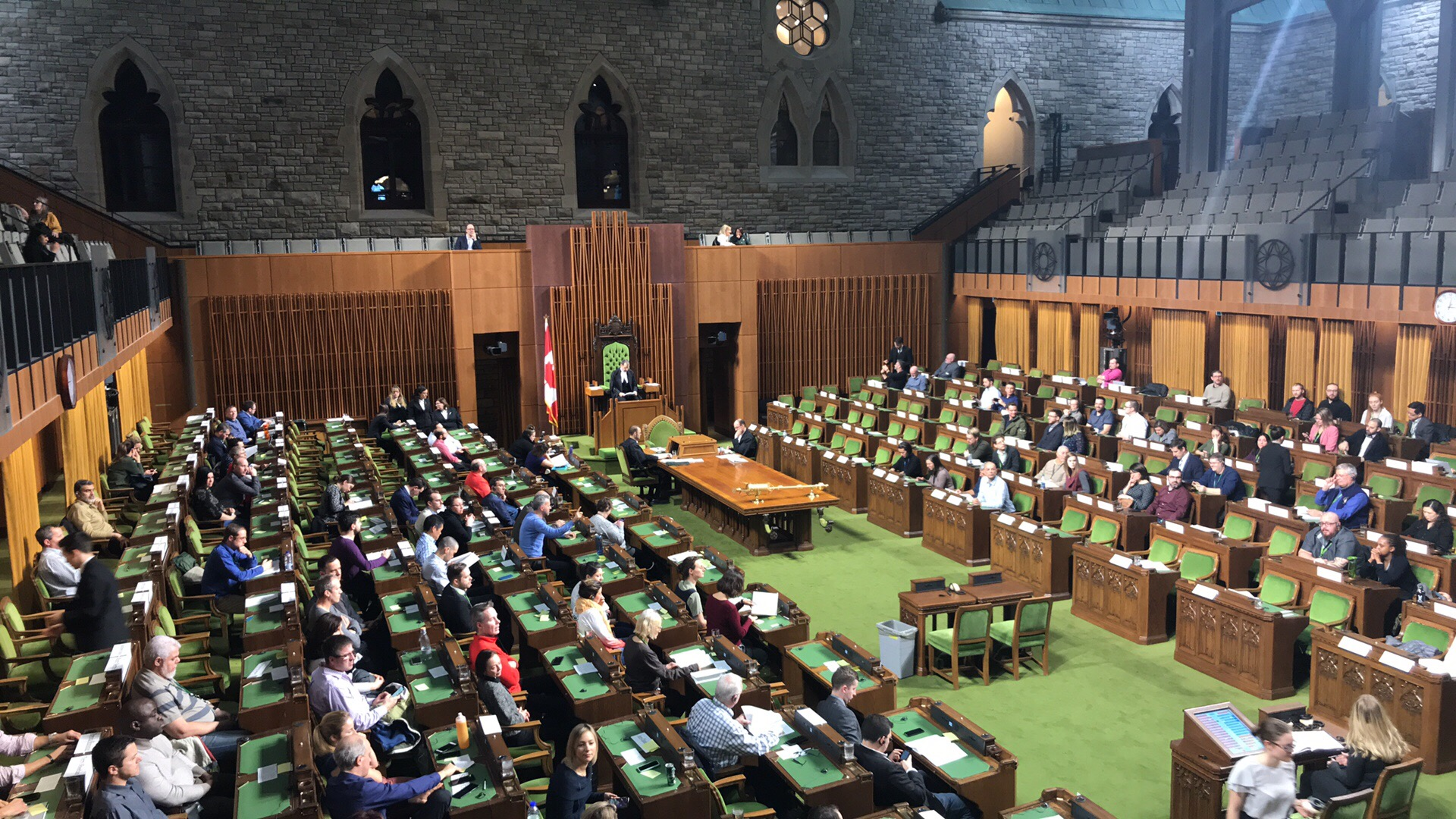
The interim House of Commons Chamber, built in West Block's old courtyard, during a dry run in January 2019

The Department of Public Works sent out, on 7 May 1859, a call for architects to submit proposals for the new parliament buildings to be erected on Barrack Hill, which was answered by 298 submitted drawings. After the entries were narrowed down to three, then Governor General Sir Edmund Walker Head was approached to break the stalemate and the winner was announced on 29 August 1859. The departmental buildings, Centre Block, and a new residence for the Governor General were each awarded separately and the team of Thomas Stent and Augustus Laver, under the pseudonym of Stat nomen in umbra, won the prize for the first category.

Construction on all three blocks commenced by the end of 1859. By the time the West Block was completed in 1865, the building was three years behind schedule. The first tenants were the offices of the postmaster general, the Ministry of Public Works, and the Crown lands departments. As the number of parliamentary and administrative staff increased with the expansion of the country's area, more space was added to the West Block: the Mackenzie Wing and Tower in 1878 and, in 1906, the Laurier Tower and link.

In the early 2000s, the masonry of the West Block was found to be in a state of severe disrepair. Scaffolding and protective sheeting were erected in order to prevent falling blocks from striking pedestrians and cars below and a restoration project was immediately implemented. The two largest towers were also stabilised with temporary steel structures for fear of stones falling off them.

An $863 million project to completely renovate the West Block began in 2011, and the renovated building opened on 28 January 2019. In preparation for a planned, decade-long renovation of the Centre Block to begin in 2019, the central courtyard of the West Block was transformed into a temporary chamber for the House of Commons. The new chamber is surrounded by formerly exterior stone walls and covered by a glass roof. Multiple underground levels as well as planned tunnel connections to other Parliament Hill buildings were constructed out of dug-out bedrock under the West Block during the extensive renovations. When the renovation of Centre Block is complete and the House returns to its traditional chamber, the interim House chamber will be used as committee rooms.
