= Jane Herdman =

English philanthropist

- Born: Jane Brandreth Holt; 1867; Liverpool, England
- Died: 7 November 1922 (aged 54–55); Liverpool, England
- Education: University of Liverpool
- Spouse: William Abbott Herdman (m. 1893)
- Parents: Alfred Holt; Catherine Long
- Relatives: George Herdman (son); Emma Herdman (daughter); George Holt (grandfather); George Holt (uncle); Robert Durning Holt (uncle); Emma Holt (cousin)

Jane, Lady Herdman (née Holt; 1867 – 1922) was a student and early patron of the University of Liverpool and was an education committee member in Liverpool in the early twentieth century. In the last year of her life (1922), her husband acquired a knighthood and she was formally known as Jane, Lady Herdman or Lady Herdman.

== Early life ==
Jane Herdman was the daughter of Alfred Holt, a Liverpool ship owner, merchant and engineer, and Catherine Long. The family lived at Crofton Mansion, Aigburth. In 1891, she graduated with a first class honours degree in chemistry from the University of London, having studied science at the University College Liverpool (later to become the University of Liverpool). She became the first President of the Women Students’ Representative Council in Liverpool, in 1892. She married William Abbott Herdman, who held the chair in Natural History at the University College, in 1893 at Toxteth Park Registry Office. They lived at Croxteth Lodge on Ullet Road.

== Patronage of the university and work in education ==
Jane and her husband William endowed the University of Liverpool £10,000, to found the George Herdman Chair of Geology in remembrance of their son, George, who died at the Battle of the Somme. They also funded a Chair of Oceanography.

=== The George Herdman Professors of Geology ===
The first George Herdman Professor of Geology was appointed in 1917. Since then the holders of the chair have been:

- Percy Boswell (1917 to 1930)
- H H Read (1931 to 1939)
- Frank Coles Phillips (1947)
- Robert Millner Shackleton (1948 to 1962)
- Wallace Spencer Pitcher (1964 to 1981)
- Trevor Elliott (1983 to 2007)
- Peter Kokelaar (2008 to 2014)
- John Wheeler (2017 – ).

=== The Herdman Professors of Oceanography ===
The Herdman Chair in Oceanography was endowed by the Herdmans in 1919. Holders of the chair include:

- William Abbott Herdman (1919 to 1920)
- James Johnstone (1920 to 1932)
- Joseph Proudman (1933 to 1954)
- Kenneth Frank Bowden (1954-82)
- John Price Riley (1987 to 1991)
- Roy Chester (1991 to 2001)
- George Wolff

=== Other benefactions ===
In 1920, Mrs Herdman donated three acres of land near Greenbank Lane to the governors of Blackburne House School, to improve the sporting facilities for girls (the Holts had a long established philanthropic involvement with this school - Jane's grandfather, George Holt, was the founder of the school). Lady Herdman was a member of the Education Committee and was chairman of the Girls School Committee from 1911 to 1922

=== The Jane Herdman geological laboratories ===
After Lady Herdman's death in 1922, her widower made a further endowment of £20,000 towards the building of new geological laboratories which were named in remembrance of his wife. The Lady Herdman geological laboratories were opened in 1929.
