= Philip White =

Philip or Phil White may refer to:

- Phil White (American football) (1900–1982), American football halfback and medical doctor
- Phil White (politician) (1938–2000), Australian politician
- Phil R. White (born 1963), Canadian artist and sculptor
- Philip White (Canadian politician) (1923–2013), mayor of York, Ontario, 1970–1978
- Philip Bruce White (1891–1949), British microbiologist
- Philip Jacob White (1863–1929), British physician and zoologist
- Philip L. White (1923–2009), American historian and civic activist
- Phil White (footballer) (1930–2000), English football winger
- Philip Rodney White (1901–1968), American agricultural scientist
- Phil White (pole vaulter) (born 1941), American pole vaulter, 1962 All-American for the Stanford Cardinal track and field team
