= James Johnstone (biologist) =

Scottish biologist and oceanographer (1870-1932)

James Johnstone (born 17 January 1870 in Beith, Ayrshire – died 1932 in Liverpool) was a Scottish biologist and oceanographer. His studies focused on the food chain in marine ecosystems.

== Biography ==
Johnstone began his working life as an apprentice woodcarver in Lochwinnoch, but rose to become professor at the University of Liverpool, holding the chair of oceanography from 1920 to 1932. This chair had been created in 1919 by professor William Abbott Herdman and his wife.

Johnstone was a founding member of the Society for Experimental Biology (SEB). He was also active in creating the British Journal of Experimental Biology (BJEB), serving on the journal's editorial board. In 1929, the publication changed its name to Journal of Experimental Biology.

To honor his memory, a flatworm Rhipidocotyle johnstonei was named after James Johnstone.

== Bibliography ==
- James Johnstone – British fisheries : their administration and their problems; a short account of the origin and growth of British seafishery - London : Williams & Norgate, 1905. - XXXI, 350, 62 S.
- James Johnstone - Conditions of Life in the Sea. a short account of quantitative marine biological research – Cambridge University Press, Cambridge. 1908. .
- James Johnstone - Life in the sea - Cambridge, The University Press, 1911
- Johnstone, James, The philosophy of biology Cambridge, University Press, 1914.
- James Johnstone – The Mechanism Of Life In Relation To Modern Physical Theory - 1921
- Johnstone, James – An introduction to oceanography, with special reference to geography and geophysics - Liverpool, The University press of Liverpool; London, Hodder and Stoughton 1923. In this book, he first used the term trench in its modern sense for any marked, elongate depression of the sea bottom.
- James Johnstone – A Study of the Oceans – London, Edward Arnold & Co, 1930
