= Alfred Holt =

British engineer, ship owner and merchant

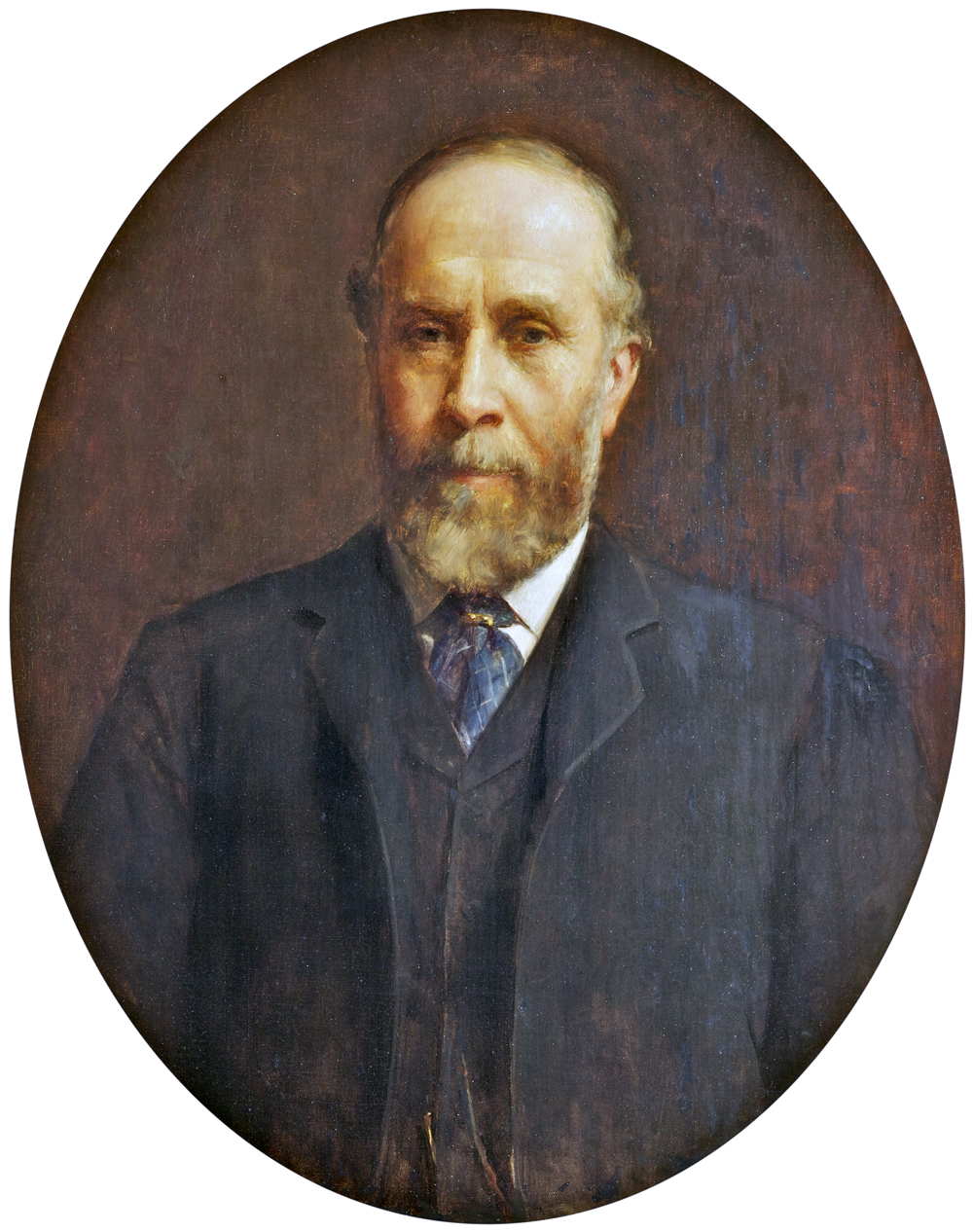
Alfred Holt, from the Sudley House collection. Oil on canvas, ca. 1880–1903, by Robert Edward Morrison

Alfred Holt (13 June 1829 – 28 November 1911) was a British engineer, ship owner and merchant. He lived at Crofton, Sudley Road, Aigburth in Liverpool, England. Holt is credited with establishing the long distance steamship by developing a type that replaced sailing clippers on the route from Britain to China.

Alfred Holt was one of six brothers, born to George Holt and his wife, Emma. In 1866, he and his brother, Philip Holt founded the Alfred Holt and Company and the Ocean Steam Ship Company, which owned and operated the majority of the company's vessels. Alfred Holt & Co later became Blue Funnel Line.

One of his other brothers, George Holt, was also a noted Liverpool merchant and ship owner. His youngest brother, Robert Durning Holt, was Mayor of Liverpool. All were Unitarians.

== Steamship design and ownership ==
Holt served an apprenticeship under the chief engineer of the Liverpool & Manchester Railway, learning the basics of both mechanical and civil engineering. On finishing his apprenticeship, he established himself as an engineering consultant, and soon became involved in ship management. The efficiencies of compound steam engines, which were widely used in railway locomotives, were not available to steamships as the Board of trade limited the steam pressures of marine boilers to about 20 psi (140 kPa). Not only did Holt understand the well-known benefits of higher steam pressures running compound engines, but he also had the negotiating skills to gain the approval of the Board of Trade to put this into effect. The result was Cleator, the testbed for these ideas, running at 60 psi (410 kPa).

Holt then set about designing a steamship for the China trade. This was a route worked almost entirely by sail. The Peninsular and Oriental Steam Navigation Company had a steamship route to China from Britain that went along the Mediterranean, with an overland section to the north end of the Red Sea and then to China by sea. A few auxiliary steamships sailed to China round the Cape of Good Hope, using their steam engines in light winds. The more prominent cargo vessels on this route were the clippers engaged in the tea trade, but many ordinary merchant sailing vessels also sailed to China. The passage from London to China is about 14,000 nautical miles. The problem for a steamer was to have space for enough coal for this distance, but still carry a commercial amount of cargo. Holt achieved a big increase in efficiency that made this possible.

Agamemnon was launched in 1865. Holt designed a compact double expansion engine that left the maximum amount of room in the hull for cargo. He also developed an easily driven hull, which was strong yet both economical to build and light in weight. The complete design package, including the higher boiler pressures, gave a ship that could steam from London to China with one coaling stop in Mauritius on the way out, and another on the return trip. This was commercially successful before the opening of the Suez Canal (in 1869). Two sister ships to Agamemnon were ordered before she had completed her maiden voyage. Holt's new technology was soon copied by others, and by 1870, tea clippers were finding strong competition from steamships. In 1871, the success of steamship routes to China was clear, with 45 steamers being built in Clyde shipyards for Far Eastern trade.

== Personal life ==
Holt was married twice. He married his first wife, Catherine Long in 1865. They had a daughter, Jane (1867–1922), who married the marine biologist William Abbott Herdman; a son, George, who became one of the managers of the Blue Funnel Line; and another son, who died in his teens. After Catherine's death in 1869, Alfred Holt married her cousin, Frances Long (in 1871), with whom he had two more sons. The youngest son, also named Alfred (1877–1931), became a Reader in Chemistry at the University of Liverpool.
