= Canadian Parliament Buildings =

Canadian national parliament buildings in Ontario

Coordinates: 45°25′30″N 75°42′0″W

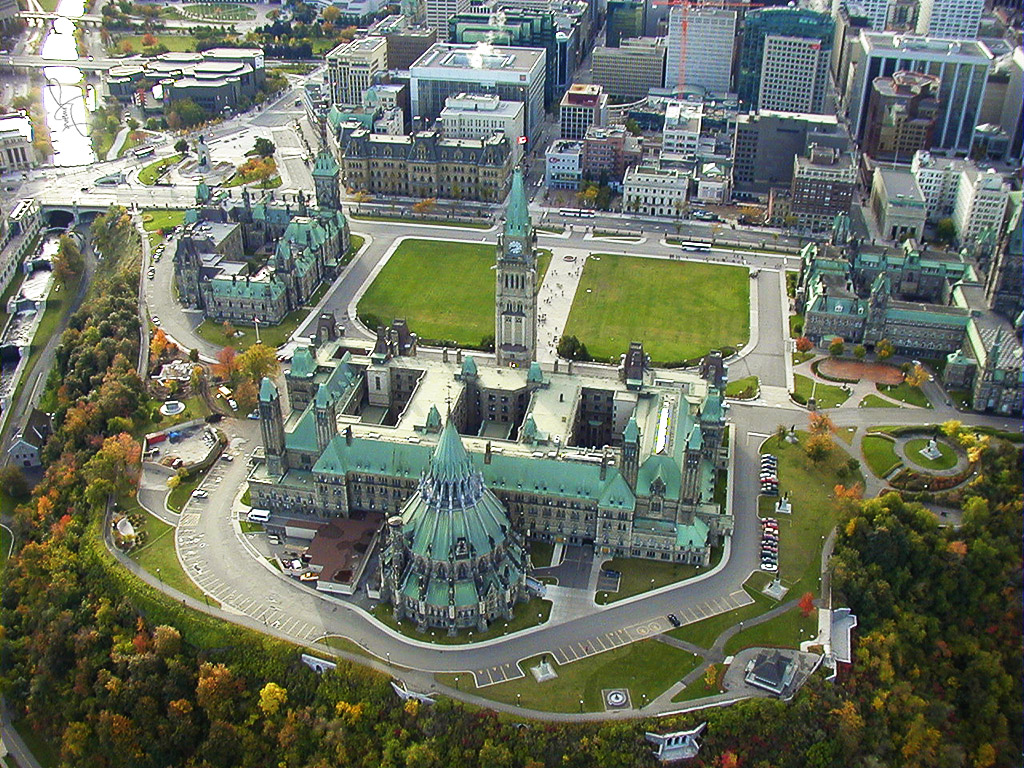
Aerial view of the Canadian Parliament Buildings from the north

The Canadian Parliament Buildings house the Parliament of Canada, located on Parliament Hill, Ottawa, Ontario, Canada.

== Parliament Buildings ==
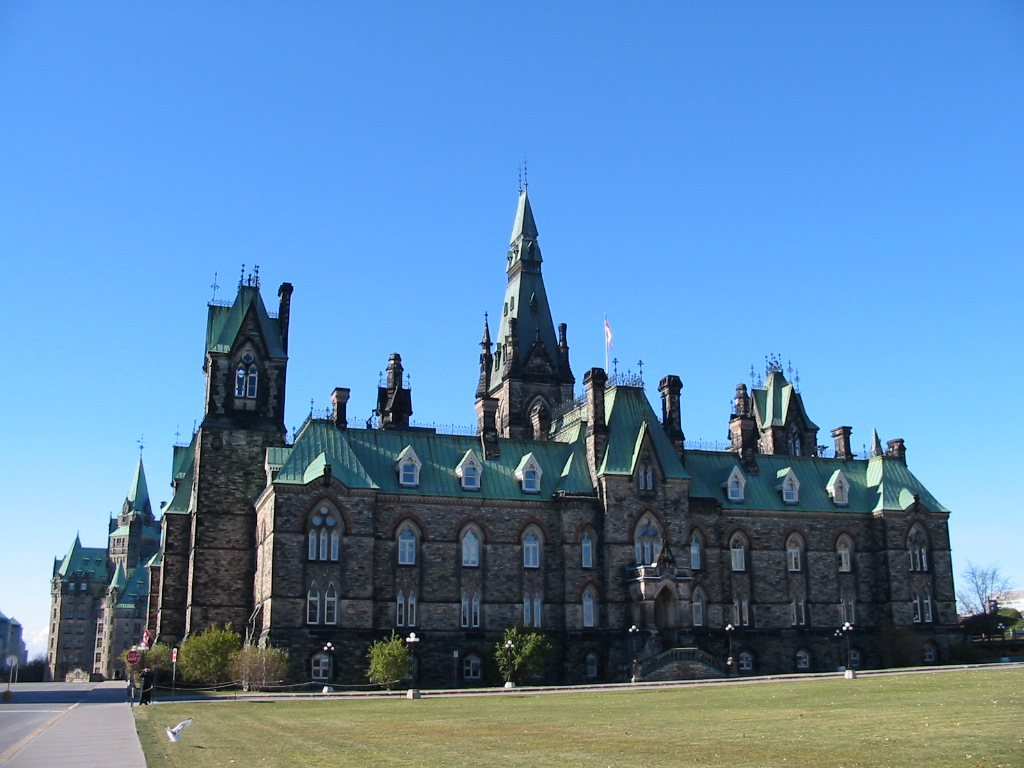
West Block

Centre Block

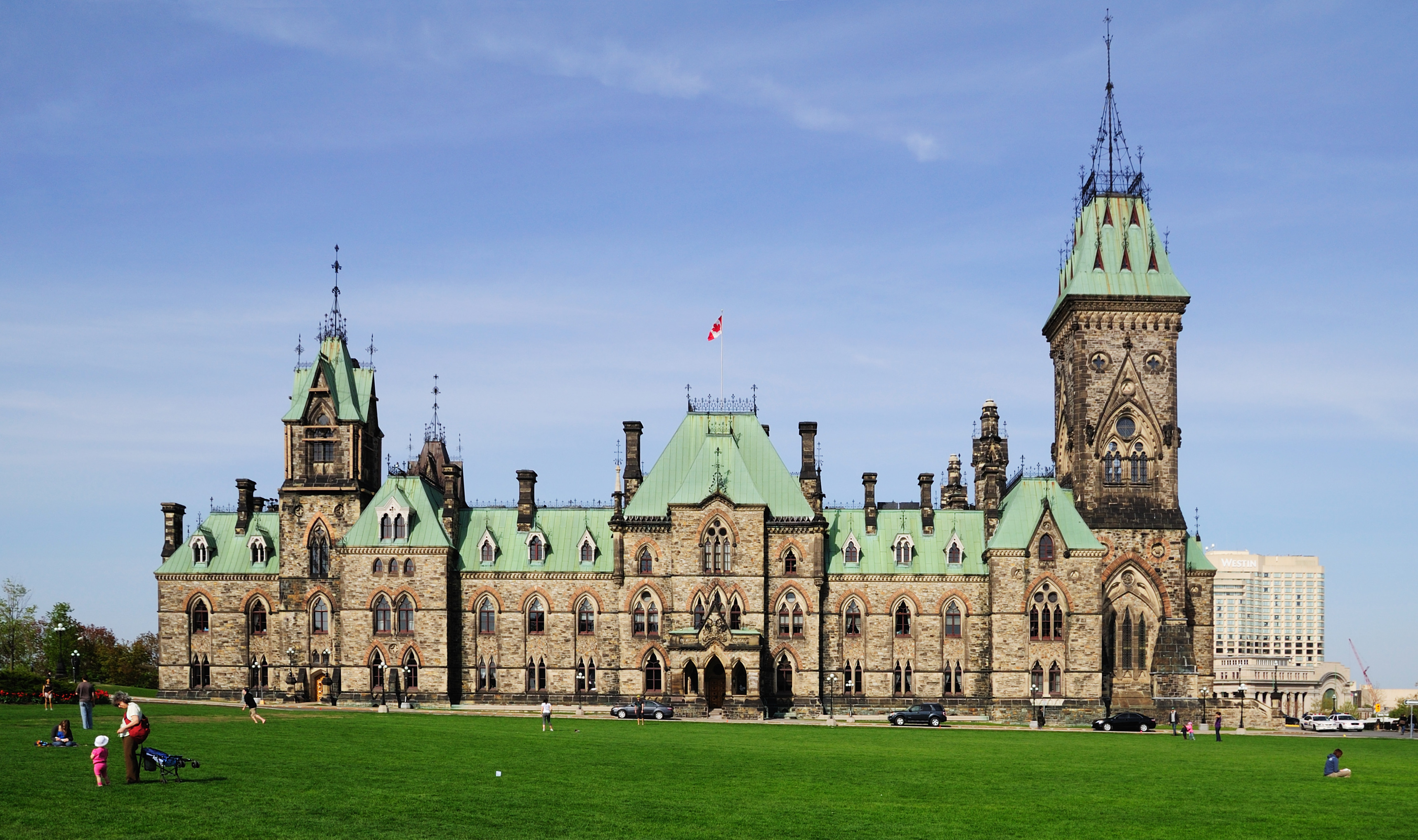
East Block

The three main edifices on Parliament Hill

The Parliament Buildings are three edifices arranged around three sides of Parliament Hill's central lawn, they are known as the centre block, west block, and east block. The use and administration of the spaces within each building overseen by the speakers of each chamber of the legislature. The Centre Block (completed 1927, replaced 1866 fire-ravaged original) has the Senate and Commons chambers, and is fronted by the Peace Tower on the south facade, with the Library of Parliament (completed 1876) at the building's rear. The East Block (completed 1866) and West Block (completed 1865) each contain ministers' and senators' offices, as well as meeting rooms and other administrative spaces.

Gothic Revival has been used as the unifying style of all three structures, though the Centre Block is a more modern Gothic Revival, while the older East and West Blocks are of a Victorian High Gothic.

== Architecture ==
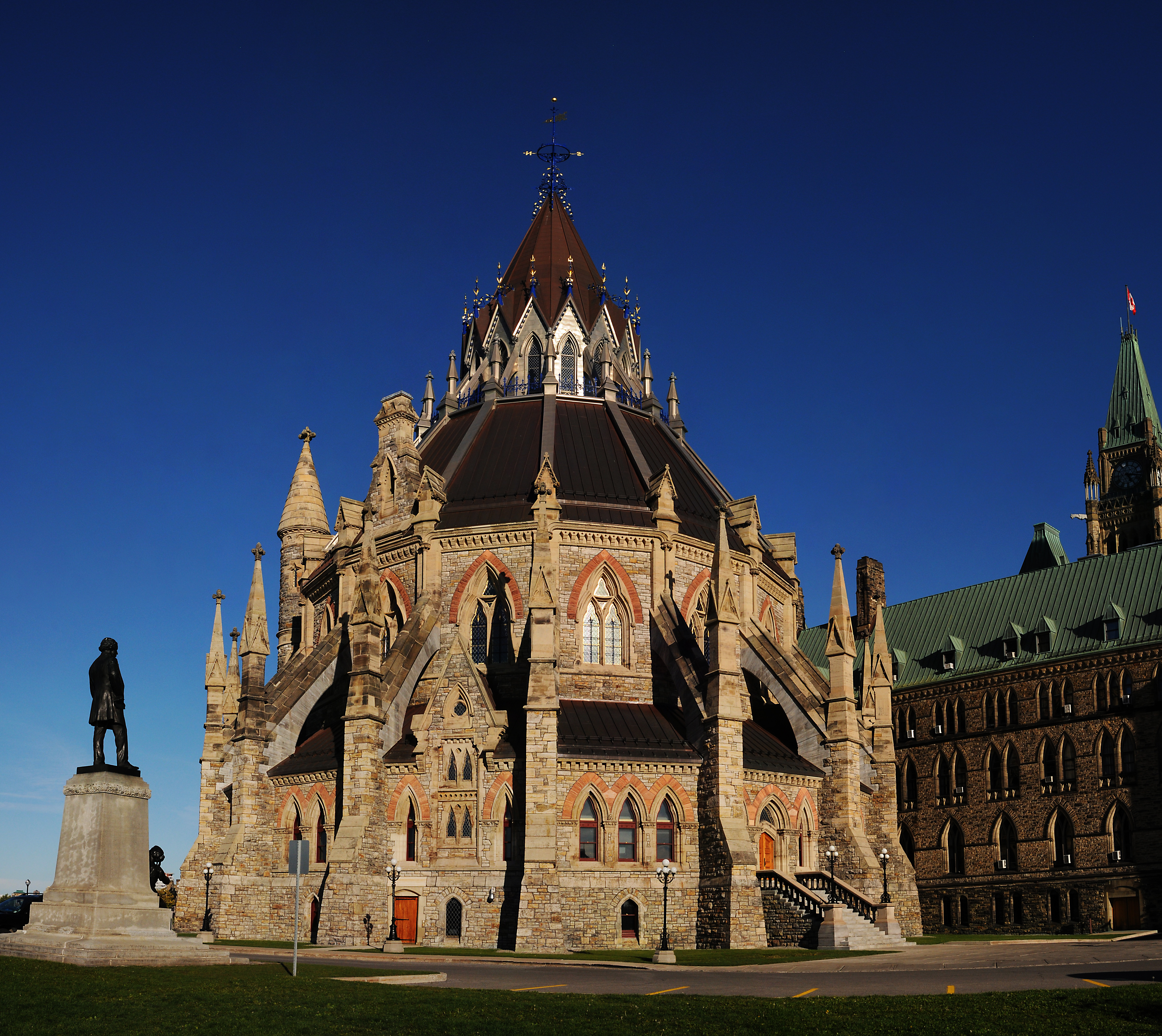
The Library of Parliament, situated behind Centre Block. All the parliament buildings are designed in a Gothic Revival style

This collection is one of the world's most important examples of the Gothic Revival style; while the buildings' manner and design are unquestionably Gothic, they resemble no building constructed during the Middle Ages. The forms were the same, but their arrangement was uniquely modern. The parliament buildings also departed from the Medieval models by integrating a variety of eras and styles of Gothic architecture, including elements from Britain, France, the Low Countries, and Italy, all in three buildings. In his 1867 Hand Book to the Parliamentary and Departmental Buildings, Canada, Joseph Bureau wrote

The style of the Buildings is the Gothic of the 12th and 13th Centuries, with modifications to suit the climate of Canada. The ornamental work and the dressing round the windows are of Ohio sandstone. The plain surface is faced with a cream-coloured sandstone of the Potsdam formation, obtained from Nepean, a few miles from Ottawa. The spandrils of the arches, and the spaces between window-arches and the sills of the upper windows, are filled up with a quaint description of stonework, composed of stones of irregular size, shape and color, very neatly set together. These with the Potsdam red sandstone employed in forming the arches over the windows, afford a pleasant variety of color and effect, and contrast with the general masses of light coloured sandstone, of which the body of the work is composed.

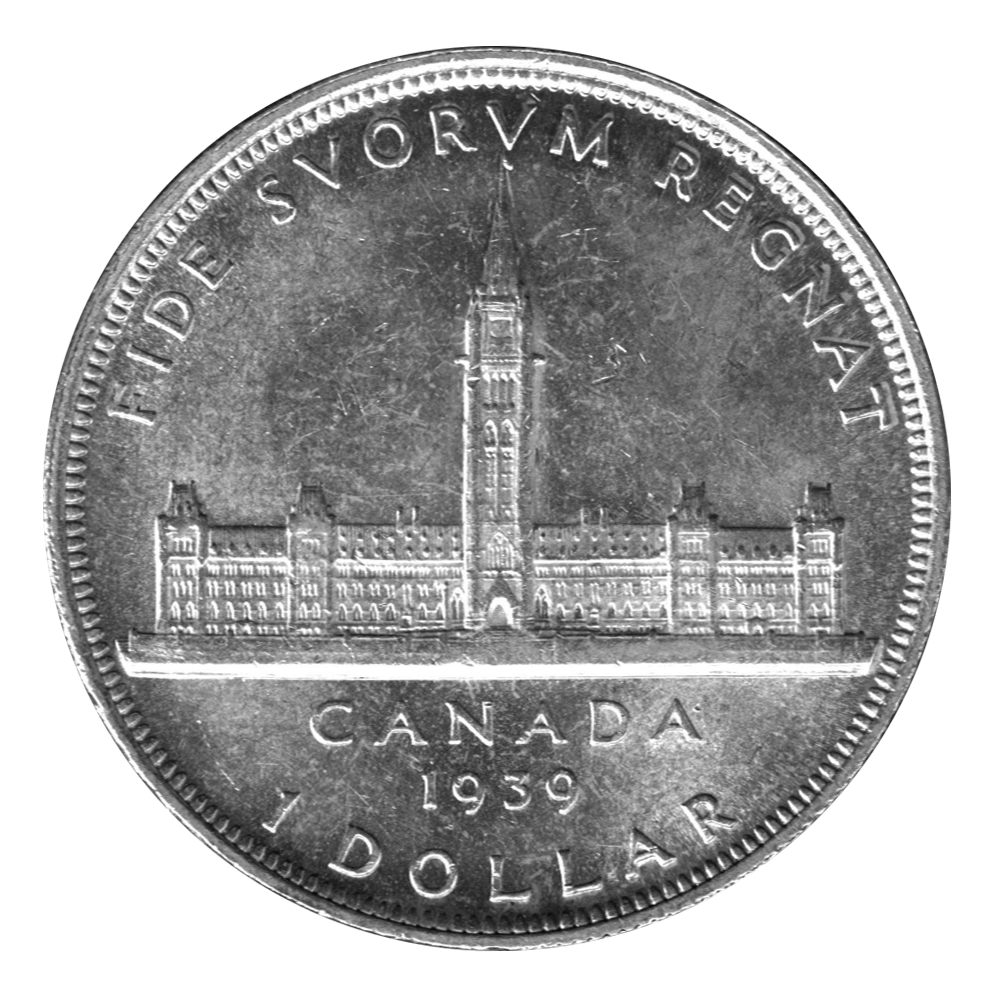
Canadian silver dollar commemorating the 1939 royal tour and depicting the Centre Block of the Parliament Buildings.

The sculptural ornament is overseen by the Dominion Sculptor. Five people have held the position since its creation in 1936: Cléophas Soucy (1936–50), William Oosterhoff (1949–62), Eleanor Milne (1962–93), Maurice Joanisse (1993–2006) and Phil R. White (2006–present).

== Alterations ==
The only structure on Parliament Hill to have been purposefully demolished was the old Supreme Court building, which stood behind the West Block and housed the Supreme Court of Canada between 1889 and 1945. Throughout the 1950s and 1960s, there were proposals to demolish other parliamentary precinct buildings, including the Library of Parliament and West Block for new structures, and the East Block for parking, but none of these plans were adopted. Instead, renovations were undertaken to the East Block, beginning in 1966.

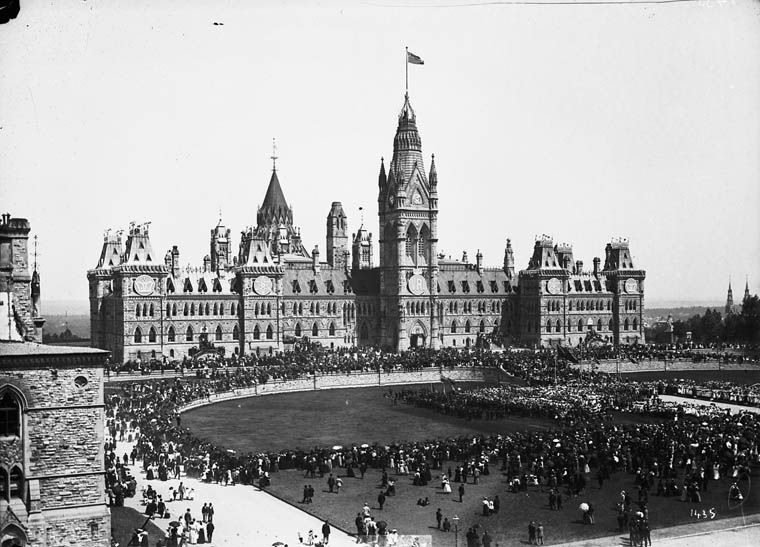
The original Centre Block building in 1897. The building was later destroyed as a result of a fire in 1916.

In 2002, an extensive $1 billion renovation project began across the parliamentary precinct, specifically focusing on masonry restoration, asbestos removal, vehicle screening, parking, electrical and mechanical systems, and improved visitors' facilities. The Library of Parliament and Peace Tower, as well as some exterior areas of masonry on the Centre Block have so far been completed, though focus has shifted to the West Block due to its rapidly deteriorating cladding. In 2018, when the Centre Block is slated to be closed for ten years to carry out an extensive interior restoration and upgrade, the inner courtyard of the newly renovated West Block will be enclosed and fitted with a temporary chamber for the House of Commons while the Senate will be temporarily relocated down Wellington St. in The Government Conference Centre. Restoration of the East block is set to commence upon completion of Centre Block's restoration.
