= Landscape, Hampstead (Millais painting) =

Painting by John Everett Millais

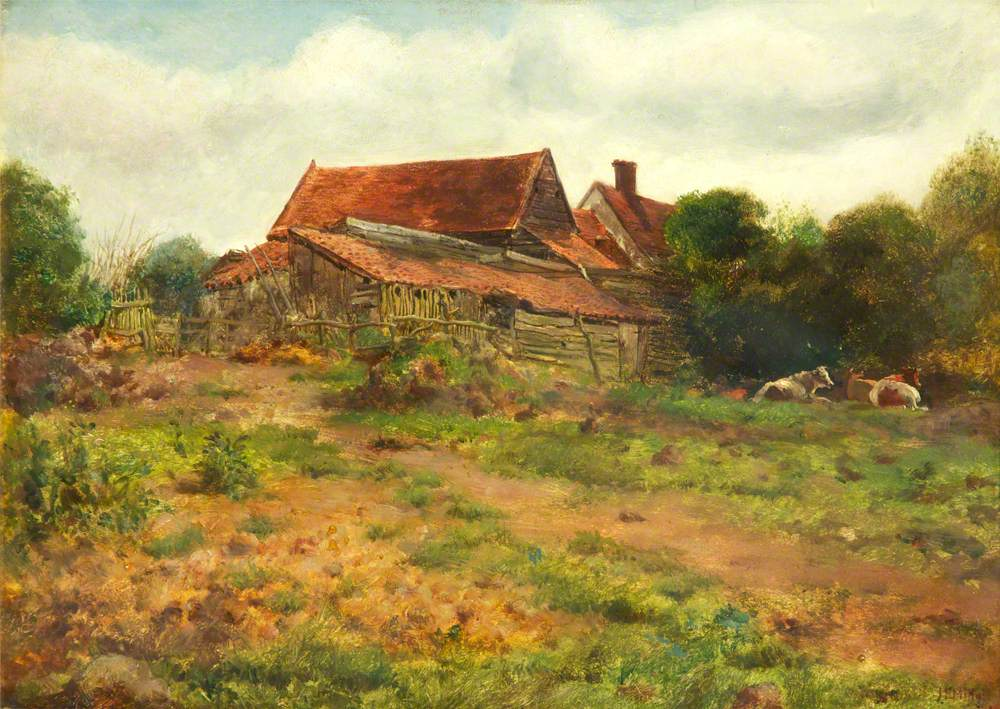
- Artist: John Everett Millais
- Year: c. 1848
- Type: Oil on panel
- Dimensions: 23.1 cm × 33.6 cm (9.1 in × 13.2 in)
- Location: Sudley House, Liverpool

Landscape, Hampstead, also known as Hampstead Heath, is an early oil painting by English artist John Everett Millais, painted in circa 1848. It shows a farmhouse complex or a couple of cottages with outbuildings, on the edge of rough land where some cows are resting.

The painting was probably painted when Millais was staying with Hugh Fenn (the subject of Millais' 1848 portrait) at a cottage rented by Fenn at North End in Hampstead, London.

The painting hung under the title Hampstead Heath in a special Winter Exhibition at the Royal Academy, London, held between January and March 1898, which featured many collected works of the late Millais. At the time it was the property of Thomas Whatmore, Esq. It was exhibited in the 1967 Millais exhibition at the Royal Academy, which travelled to the Walker Art Gallery in Liverpool.

The painting was bequeathed to the Walker Art Gallery, Liverpool in 1944 by Emma Holt, and its accession number is WAG 271. It is normally on display at Sudley House, Liverpool.

== See also ==
- List of paintings by John Everett Millais
