= Schloss Rosenau (painting) =

Painting by J. M. W. Turner

Schloss Rosenau, Seat of HRH Prince Albert of Coburg
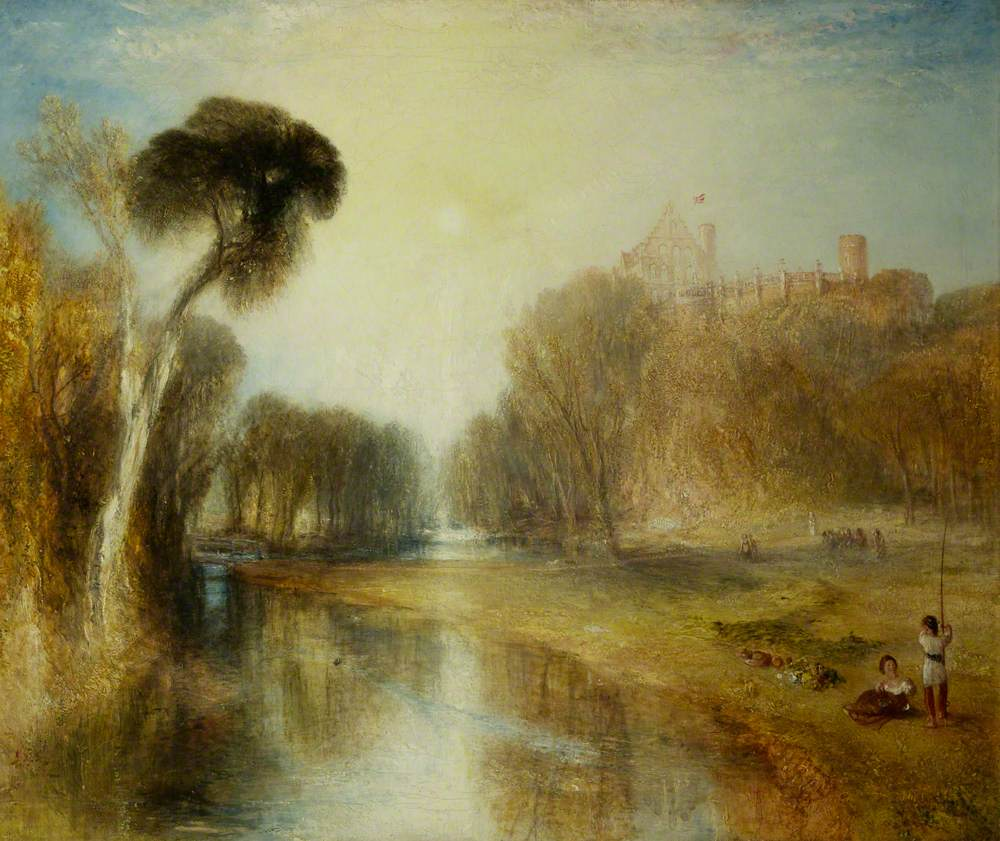
- Artist: J. M. W. Turner
- Year: 1841
- Medium: Oil on canvas
- Dimensions: 97.2 cm × 124.8 cm (38.3 in × 49.1 in)
- Location: Sudley House, Liverpool
- Accession: WAG 309
- Website: liverpoolmuseums.org.uk/artifact/schloss-rosenau-seat-of-hrh-prince-albert-of-coburg

Schloss Rosenau is an 1841 landscape painting by the British artist J. M. W. Turner. It depicts a view of Schloss Rosenau in Coburg in Germany. The castle was the birthplace and ancestral home of Prince Albert of Saxe-Coburg and Gotha. Turner sketched the castle on his journey back from Venice in 1840 and then worked up the scene into an oil painting.

It was produced the year that Albert married Queen Victoria. Turner may have hoped the couple would buy the painting, but they did not. It was displayed at the Royal Academy's Summer Exhibition of 1841 at the National Gallery in London. It was subsequently bought by Joseph Gillott. Today it is in the collection of the National Museums Liverpool at Sudley House.

The painting demonstrates Turner's interest in light, with his depiction of the sun and its reflection on the water. The castle is on the right seen through the haze.

== See also ==
- List of paintings by J. M. W. Turner

== Bibliography ==
- Bailey, Anthony. J.M.W. Turner: Standing in the Sun. Tate Enterprises, 2013.
- Hamilton, James. Turner - A Life. Sceptre, 1998.
- Stainton, Lindsay. Turner's Venice. British Museum, 1985.
