= Frank Coles Phillips =

British crystallographer, mineralogist and petrologist (1902–1982)

- Born: 19 March 1902; Plymouth, England
- Died: 11 September 1982 (aged 80); Brockenhurst, Hampshire, England
- Education: Corpus Christi College, Cambridge (BA, PhD)
- Awards: Murchison Fund (1938); Bolitho Gold Medal (1962)
- Scientific career
- Fields: Crystallography, mineralogy and structural petrology
- Workplaces: University of Cambridge; University of Liverpool; University of Bristol
- Thesis: The geology of the Shetland Islands with special reference to the petrology of the igneous rocks (1927)
- Doctoral advisor: Alfred Harker
- Doctoral students: Stuart Olof Agrell

Frank Coles Phillips (19 March 1902 – 11 September 1982) was a British crystallographer, mineralogist and petrologist. He wrote textbooks on crystallography and structural geology. Phillips held the George Herdman chair of geology at the University of Liverpool for one year, in 1947, and was later Professor of Mineralogy and Petrology at the University of Bristol.

== Early life ==
Phillips was born in Plymouth, Devon, on 19 March 1902. His mother was Kate Phillips (née Salmon); his father, Nicholas Phillips, was a government tax officer. Phillips had an older brother and an older sister. He grew up near Plymouth, and went to school at Plymouth College.

== Education ==
Phillips went to Corpus Christi College, Cambridge, in September 1920. He gained a first class in Part 1 of the Mathematical Tripos in 1921. In 1922, he was appointed as temporary demonstrator in petrology in the Sedgwick Museum, Cambridge, where he worked under Alfred Harker. In 1923, Phillips gained his B.A., and completed part 1 in the Natural Sciences Tripos. He graduated in geology in 1924. Phillips then began working towards a PhD thesis, with a study of the petrology of the igneous rocks of the Shetland islands. He was supervised by Harker for his PhD. Phillips was also student demonstrator in mineralogy for the period 1925 to 1928.

== Career ==
After completing his PhD, Phillips remained in Cambridge, where he began to focus on the microscopic structure of metamorphic rocks. In 1928, he was appointed demonstrator in mineralogy, and in 1932 was appointed University lecturer in mineralogy and petrology in the new department of mineralogy and petrology, headed by Cecil Edgar Tilley. He remained in Cambridge until 1946.

In late 1946, Phillips applied for the George Herdman chair of geology at the University of Liverpool. This post had been unfilled since the incumbent, H H Read, had resigned to take up a chair at Imperial College, London. Phillips was duly appointed to this post, and took on this role. After a laboratory fire caused extensive damage to his research records, he retired on medical grounds and returned to Cambridge in late 1947 to convalesce. In 1948, Phillips was encouraged to apply for a lectureship in geology at the University of Bristol. He was offered the post, and then remained at Bristol for the rest of his career. Phillips was elected Professor of Mineralogy and Petrology at Bristol in 1964, and was both deputy dean of the science faculty, and acting head of department, from 1966 to 1967. From 1965 to 1968, Phillips was also vice-president of the Mineralogical Society of Great Britain and Ireland. He retired in 1967.

== Writings ==
Phillips wrote many research papers through his career, including papers on the microstructure and fabrics of crystalline metamorphic rocks from the Moine schists of northern Scotland. He was best known for his text books on crystallography and on structural geology. He also published a revised edition of Herbert Smith's Gemstones, and in his retirement completed a translation from German of Bruno Sander's two-volume 1948 memoir on rock fabrics and structural geology, Einführung in die Gefügekunde geologischer Körper.

- Phillips, F.C. (1946). An Introduction to Crystallography. Longmans, Green. p. 302. ISBN 0582443210.
- Phillips, F.C. (1954). The Use of Stereographic Projection in Structural Geology. E. Arnold. p. 86.

== Awards and legacy ==
Phillips was awarded the Murchison Fund of the Geological Society of London in 1938 ‘for his contributions to metamorphism and structural petrology’. In 1962, he was awarded the William Bolitho Gold Medal of the Royal Geological Society of Cornwall.

In 2002, prompted by the lack of any formal obituaries or accounts of Phillips' life and works, a former colleague and a former student of Phillips (Bernard Leake and Richard Howarth) published a memoir that documented his life and career in detail. Howarth and Leake argue that Phillips' major contributions to the subject of geology were through his teaching and textbooks, which helped to establish the way that the field of structural geology developed in the UK in the 1930s.

== Family and later life ==
In 1929, Phillips married Seonee Barker (born 1904). They had two children, born in 1931 and 1934.

In his retirement, Phillips moved to Brockenhurst, Hampshire. He died of pneumonia on 11 September 1982.
