= Bernard Elgey Leake =

English geologist

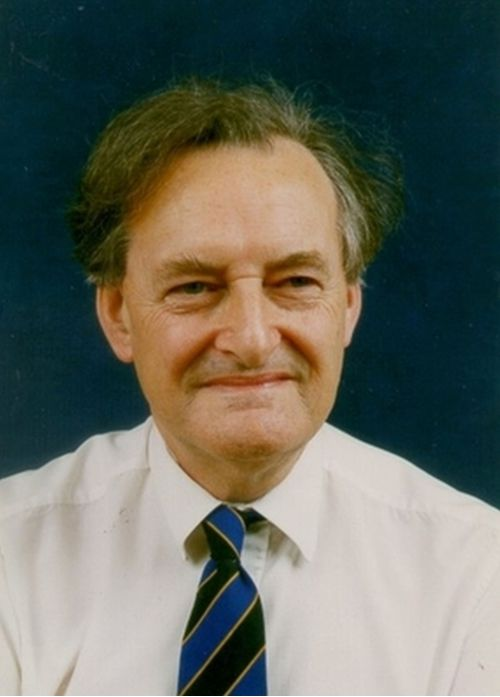
- Born: 29 July 1932 (age 94); Grimsby, Lincolnshire, England
- Occupation: Geologist

Bernard Elgey Leake (born 29 July 1932) is an English geologist. He is emeritus professor of geology at the University of Glasgow, was Leverhulme Emeritus Fellow at Cardiff University 2000-2002 and has been an honorary research fellow at Cardiff University since 1997.

Leake was born on 29 July 1932 in Grimsby, Lincolnshire, son of Norman Sidney Leake and Clare Evelyn Walgate. He was educated at the Wirral Grammar School for Boys and the University of Liverpool, where he gained a first class BSc in 1952 and PhD in 1955. He gained DSc degrees from Bristol in 1974 and Glasgow in 1997.

Leake was a Leverhulme research fellow at Liverpool 1955–57. In 1957 he was appointed lecturer in geology at the University of Bristol, becoming reader in 1968. He was a research associate at University of California, Berkeley in 1966.

In 1974 Leake was appointed professor and head of the department of geology at the University of Glasgow and elected a Fellow of the Royal Society of Edinburgh in 1978. He was also honorary keeper of geological collections at the Hunterian Museum in Glasgow.

He was awarded the Lyell Medal of the Geological Society of London in 1977 and was president of the society 1986–88.

In 1997 Leake moved to Cardiff University where he continued to work on the petrogenesis of the Galway Granite, the geology of Joyces Country, the Clifden and Roundstone areas of Connemara and the massif as a whole. He also completed biographies of geologists F.C. Phillips and J.W.Gregory and the 125-year history of the staff in the Cardiff Geology Department 1891–2016.

== Selected publications ==
- Leake, B. E. Catalogue of Analysed Calciferous Amphiboles (1968). See Publication 129
- Leake, B. E., Tanner, P. W. G. The Geology of the Dalradian and associated rocks of Connemara, Western Ireland (1994). See Publication 117
- Leake, B. E. (chairman; 1st of 22 authors), Nomenclature of Amphiboles. (1997) See Publication 129
- Howarth, Richard J.; Leake, Bernard Elgey (2002). The life of Frank Coles Phillips (1902 - 1982) and the structural geology of the Moine petrofabric controversy. London: The Geological Society. ISBN 9781862391024.
- Leake, B. E. The Life and work of Professor J. W. Gregory FRS (1864–1932); Geologist, Writer and Explorer. (2011) See Publication 164

== Career summary ==
• Honorary Research Fellow, School of Earth & Ocean Sciences, since 2020 Earth & Environmental Sciences, Cardiff University (1997–)
• Leverhulme Emeritus Research Fellow at Cardiff University (2000–2)
• Erskine Visiting Research Fellow in Geology, Univ. of Canterbury, New Zealand (1999)
• DSc University of Glasgow 1997
• Abstracted 30,000 pages of Journal of Petrology for Mineralogical Abstracts 1995–2008
• Over 40 external BSc class Examinerships plus numerous PhD & MSc Examinerships
• Detailed Geological Mapping, chiefly Connemara, Ireland, but also Donegal, Islay, & the Scottish Highlands over 58 years (1952–2008) plus amphibole, mineralogy, petrology & geochemistry studies from all the continents except Antarctica, as shown by publication list
• Outside UK & Ireland, short field visits to Eastern Desert Egypt, South & North Appalachians, Grenville Province, Cortlandt Complex New York, North California, Colorado & Bryce Canyons, Arches NP; sites in Turkey, central Sweden & Norway; the Pilbara, Narryer, Leewin-Naturaliste and southern W Australia; Broken Hill NSW, North & South Island, New Zealand
• Honorary Treasurer of the Geologists' Association 1997–2008
• Published with Dr PWG Tanner the Dalradian geology of Connemara Memoir; mapping by Leake began in 1952. Project initiated by RM Shackleton in 1936 (Publication 117, 1994)
• Visiting Researcher, Otago Univ. New Zealand & Univ. of Western Australia (1994)
• Gledden Senior Visiting Research Fellow in Geology, Univ of Western Australia, (1985–6)
• Council Geological Society (1979–85; 1986–96; 2002–5) Chairman of Publications Committee (1975–8), vice-president (1980); Honorary Treasurer (1981–5), (1989–96) never reporting a loss; President (1986–8); Chairman Publications Board (1987–96) & with Robin Cocks & Bill French, initiated the establishment of the Geological Society's Publishing House (1987)
• Natural Environment Research Council (1978–85); Chairman of Visiting Group to the British Geological Survey (1981–5) and of the Isotope Facilities Programme (1981–5; 1987–91)
• Elected Fellow of the Royal Society of Edinburgh (1976); Council (1988–90)
• Management Committee of the Scottish Universities Research & Reactor Centre, East Kilbride (1974–92)
• Head of University of Glasgow Geology Department, later renamed Geology & Applied Geology, (1974–92)
• Professor of Geology & Honorary Keeper of the Geological Collections in the Hunterian Museum, University of Glasgow (1974–97); Life-time 37 research students supervised.
• DSc University of Bristol (1974)
• Last sole editor of the Journal of the Geological Society (1972–4)
• Associate Editor Mineralogical Magazine (1970–82)
• International Mineralogical Association, Committee on Amphibole Nomenclature: Secretary (1968–79); Chairman (1982–2006)
• Research Associate University of California, Berkeley (1966)
• Leader of a 1965-8 Bristol team of 10 who first devised & calibrated in Britain fully automatic X-ray Fluorescent chemical analyses of rocks for 38 major & trace elements (Publication 29)
• Mineralogical Society Council (1965–8; 1978–80; 1996–2000) Vice-president (1979–80; 1996–7) President (1999–2000) Managing Trustee (1997–8; 2000–4)
• Assistant Lecturer (1957–9), Lecturer (1959–68), Reader (1968–74) in Geology, University of Bristol
• Leverhulme Postdoctoral Research Fellow, Liverpool University (1955–7)
• PhD Department of Geology, University of Liverpool with 6 months geochemistry at Imperial College. Geology of the Cashel district (Connemara, Ireland) 1955.
• BSc Honours Geology, 1st class, University of Liverpool (1952).
• Wirral Grammar School for Boys, Lever House, Bebington, Wirral, Cheshire (1943–49)

== Honours and awards ==
• Lyell Medal 1977
• Elected Fellow of the Royal Society of Edinburgh (1978)
• Sodic amphibole leakeite named in 1992 by International Mineralogical Association
• Honorary Member of Mineralogical Society (2004)
• Honorary Member of the Liverpool Geological Society (2007)
• President of the Geological (1986–8) & Mineralogical Societies (1998–2000)
• Honorary Member of the Geologists’ Association & their Foulerton Award (2010)

== Professional memberships ==
Geological Societies of London, Edinburgh, Yorkshire, Liverpool, Norway, Finland, India & America*.
Mineralogical Societies of Great Britain & Ireland; America; Canada; Switzerland.
American Geophysical Union;
All Life Memberships except * item.
Geochemical Society (1965–2006);
Geological Association of Canada (1978–2008);
Glasgow Geological Society (1975–97)

== Chronological list of publications ==
1. 1958 B.E. Leake. The Cashel-Lough Wheelaun intrusion, Co. Galway, Proc. Roy. Irish Acad. 59 B 155–203.

2. 1958 B.E. Leake. Composition of pelites from Connemara, Co. Galway, Ireland. Geol. Mag. 95 .281-296.

3. 1960 B.E. Leake. Compilation of chemical analyses and physical constants of natural cordierites. Amer. Mineral. 45, 282–298.

4. 1960 B.E. Leake & G. Skirrow. The pelitic hornfelses of the Cashel-Lough Wheelaun intrusion, County Galway, Eire. Journ. Geol. 68, 23–40.

5. 1960 B. W . Evans & B.E. Leake. The composition and origin of the striped amphibolites of Connemara, Ireland. Jour. Petrol. 1, 337-¬363.

6. 1962 B.E. Leake. On the non-existence of a vacant area in the Hallimond calciferous amphibole diagram. Jap. Jour. Geol. Geogr. 33, 1–13.

7. 1963 B.E. Leake. Origin of amphibolites from northwest Adirondacks, New York. Geol. Soc. Amer. Bull. 74, 1193–1202.

8. 1963 B.E. Leake & P.J. Leggo. On the age relations of the Connemara Migmatites and the Galway Granite, West of Ireland. Geol. Mag. 100, 193–204.

9. 1963 B.E. Leake. The location of the Southern Uplands Fault in central Ireland. Geol. Mag. 100, 420–423.

10. 1963 B.E. Leake. A possible fossil in a graphitic marble in the Connemara Schist, Cornamona, Co. Galway, Ireland. Geol. Mag. 100, 44–46.

11. 1964 B.E. Leake. The chemical distinction between ortho- and para-amphibolites. Jour. Petrol. 5, 238–254.

12. 1964 B.E. Leake. New light on the Dawros peridotite, Connemara, Ireland. Geol. Mag. 101, 63–75.

13. 1964 R. Bradshaw & B.E. Leake. A chondrodite-humite-spinel marble from Sørfinnset, nesar Glomfjord, Northern Norway. Mineral. Mag. 31, 1066–1080.

14. 1965 B.E. Leake. The relationship between composition of calciferous amphibole and grade of metamorphism in 'Controls of Metamorphism' 299–318. Ed. W.S. Pitcher & G.W. Flinn, Oliver & Boyd, Edinburgh, London.

15. 1965 B.E. Leake. The relationship between tetrahedral aluminium and the maximum possible octahedral aluminium in natural calciferous and subcalciferous amphiboles. Amer. Mineral. 50, 843–851.

16. 1965 B.E. Leake. A cordierite-rich magnetite-högbomite¬orthopyroxene hornfels from Currywongaun, Connemara, Ireland. Amer. Mineral. 50, 1092 -1095.

17. 1965 B.E. Leake & F.C. Phillips. Triplite from Rhodesia. Mineral. Mag. 35, 661–662.

18. 1965 H. Winchell & B.E. Leake. Regressions of refractive indices, density and lattice constants on the composition of orthopyroxenes. Amer. Mineral. 50, 294.

19. 1965 B.E. Leake. Report on the Fergus River Cave erratics. Proc. Bristol Spelaeological Society 10, 288–9.

20. 1966 P.J. Leggo, W. Compston & B.E. Leake. Geochronology of the Connemara granities and its bearing on the antiquity of the Dalradian Series. Quart. Jour. Geol. Soc. London. 122, 91–118.

21. 1966 R.J. Howarth, C. Kilburn & B.E. Leake. The Boulder Bed Succession at Glencolumbkille, County Donegal. Proc. Roy. Irish Acad. 65 B, 117–156.

22. 1968 S. Moorbath, K. Bell, B.E. Leake & W.S. McKerrow. Geochronological Studies in Connemara and Murrisk, Western Ireland. In Radiometric dating for Geologists, 259–298. Edited by E. Hamilton and R. Farquhar. Interscience, London.

23. 1968 B.E. Leake. A catalog of analysed calciferous and subcalciferous amphiboles together with their nomenclature and associated minerals. Geol. Soc. America. Special Paper 98. 210 pages.

24. 1968 B.E. Leake. Optical properties and composition in the orthopyroxene series. Mineral. Mag. 37, 745- 747.

25. 1968 B.E. Leake, Amphibole from the Moine Nappe in Skye. Scot. Jour. Geol. 4, 287–288.

26. 1968 B.E. Leake. Zoned garnets from the Galway Granite and its aplites. Earth and Planet. Sci. Letters. 3, 311–316.

27. 1968 M.J. Cruse & B.E. Leake. The geology of Renvyle, Inishbofin and Inishshark, N.W. Connemara, County Galway. Proc. Roy. Irish Acad. 67 B, 1-36.

28. 1969 P.J. Leggo, P.W.G. Tanner & B.E. Leake. An isochron study of the Donegal Granite and some Dalradian rocks of Britain. In Amer. Assoc. Pet. Geol. Memoir 12, North Atlantic - Geology and Continental Drift, 354–362.

29. 1969 B.E. Leake, G.L. Hendry, A. Kemp, A.G. Plant, P.K. Harvey, J.R. Wilson, J.S. Coats, J.W. Aucott, T. Liinel & J.R. Howarth. The chemical analysis of rock powders by automatic X-ray fluorescence. Chemical Geology 5, 7 -86.

30. 1969 R. Bradshaw, A.G.P. Plant, K. Burke & B.E. Leake. The Oughterard Granite, Connemara, Co. Galway. Proc. Roy. Irish Acad. 68 B, 39¬65.

31. 1970 B.E. Leake. The origin of the Connemara migmatites of the Cashel district, Connemara, Ireland. Quart. Jour. Geol. Soc. London. 125, 219–276.

32. 1970 B.E. Leake. The fragmentation of the Connemara basic and ultrabasic intrusions in Mechanism of Igneous Intrusion, Editors G. Newall and N. Rast, 103–122.

33. 1970 B.E. Leake. Some paradoxes in Australasian micro tektite compositional trends. Jour. Geophs. Res. 75, 349–356.

34. 1970 F. Kalsbeek & B.E. Leake. The chemistry and origin of some basement amphibolites between Ivigtut and Frederikshab, south¬west Greenland. Medd. øm Gronland. 190, No. 4, 1-36.

35. 1970 B. W. Evans & B.E. Leake. The geology of the Toombeola district, Co. Galway. Proc. Roy. Irish Acad. 70 B, 105–139.

36. 1971. B.E. Leake. The discrimination of ortho and para charnockitic rocks, anorthosites and amphibolites. Indian Mineralogist, Naidu volume, 10, 89–104.

37. 1971 B.E. Leake. On aluminous and edenitic hornblendes. Min. Mag. 38, 389–407.

38. 1972 B.E. Leake. Garnetiferous striped amphibolites from Connemara, Western Ireland. Min. Mag. 38, 649–665.

39. 1972 J.R. Wilson & B.E. Leake. The petrochemistry of the epidiorites of the Tayvallich Peninsula, North Knapdale, Argyllshire. Scot. Jour. Geol. 8, 215–252.

40. 1972 B.E. Leake. The mineralogical modification of the chemistry of metamorphic rocks. Geol. Mag. 109, 331–337.

41. 1973 J.V Smith, I.M. Steele & B.E. Leake. Plagioclase compositions in the Connemara Magmatites of Cashel district Connemara, Ireland. Jour. Geology. 81, 648–650.

42. 1974 B.E. Leake The crystallization history and mechanism of emplacement of the western part of the Galway Granite, Connemara, Western Ireland. Mineral. Mag. 39, 498–513.

43. 1974 A.S. Janardhanan & B.E. Leake. Sapphirine in the Sittampundi complex, India. Mineral. Mag. 39, 901- 2.

44. 1975 D. Robinson & B.E. Leake. Sedimentary and igneous trends on AFM diagrams. Geol. Mag. 112, 305- 7.

45. 1975 V.K. Nayak & B.E. Leake. On 'winchite' from the original locality at Kajlidongri, India. Mineral. Mag. 40, 395–99

46. 1975 A. Kemp & B.E. Leake. Two hydrous-rich aluminous hornblendes. Mineral. Mag. 40, 308–11.

47. 1975 B.E. Leake, P.W.G. Tanner & A. Senior. The composition and origin of the Connemara dolomitic marbles and ophicalcites, Ireland. Jour. Petrology, 16, 237–77.

48. 1975 A.S. Janardhanan & B.E. Leake. The origin of the meta¬-anorthositic gabbros and garnetiferous granulites of the Sittampundi complex, Madras, India. J. Geol. Soc. India, 16, 391–408

49. 1976 B.E. Leake, A.S. Janardhanan and A. Kemp. High PH2O and hornblendes in the Sittampundi Complex, India. Mineral Mag. 40, 525–26.

50. 1976 P .C. van de Kamp, B.E. Leake and A. Senior. Petrography and geochemistry of some California arkoses with application of the data to gneisses of metasedimentary origin. J. Geology. 84, 195-¬212

51. 1977 D. Bremner & B.E. Leake. On the western boundary of the Galway Granite. Geol. Mag. 114, 227–8.

52. 1978 B.E. Leake. Caledonides of the Midland Valley of Scotland. ill Caledonian - Appalachian orogen of the North Atlantic Region. Geol. Survey of Canada. Paper 78–13, 87–88

53. 1978 A.A. Ahmed & B.E. Leake. The Inishdawros meta-peridotite, Callow, Ballyconneely, Connemara, Western Ireland. Mineral. Mag. 42, 69–74.

54. 1978 B.E. Leake. Granite emplacement: the granites of Ireland and their origin. In Crustal evolution in northwestern Britain and adjacent regions. Editors D.R. Bowes and B.E. Leake, 221–248. Geol. J. Special Issue 10, Seel House Press, Liverpool.

55. 1978 A. Senior & B.E. Leake. Regional metasomatism and the geochemistry of the Dalradian metasediments of Connemara, Western Ireland. J. Petrology, 19, 584–625.

56. 1978 B.E. Leake. Metamorfiche rocce. In Enciclopedia della Chimica, Vol. VII, 465–468. Uses Edizioni Scientifiche, Firenze, Italy. (Translation supplied)

57. 1978 B.E. Leake. Metamorfico processo. In Enciclopedia della Chimica, Vol. VII, 468–481. Uses Edizioni Scientifiche, Firenze, Italy. (Translation supplied)

58. 1978 B.E. Leake. Nomenclature of amphiboles. Report of the Subcommittee on amphiboles, International Mineralogical Association. Mineral. Mag. 42, 533-563 also Canadian Mineral 16, 501- 20, and Amer. Mineral. 63, 1023- 52.

59. 1978 Editor: D.R. Bowes & B.E. Leake. Crustal evolution in northwestern Britain and adjacent regions. Geol. J. Spec. Issue 10, Seel House Press, Liverpool. 492 pp.

60. 1978 Editor: B.E. Leake. A palaeogological map of the Lower Palaeozoic Floor below the cover of Upper Devonian Carboniferous and later formations by L.J. Wills, Geological Soc. of London, Memoir 8, 36 pp.

61. 1979 Editor: A.L. Harris, C.H. Holland & B.E. Leake. The Caledonides of the British Isles - reviewed. Geol. Soc. London Spec. Pub. 8, 768 pp.

62. 1979 B.E. Leake, C.M. Farrow & R. Townend. A pre-2,000 Myr old granulite facies metamorphosed evaporite from Caraiba, Brazil? Nature, Lond. 277, 49–59.

63. 1980 B.E. Leake, G.C. Brown & A.N. Halliday. The origin of granite magmas: a discussion. J. Geol. Soc. Lond. 137, 93–97.

64. 1980 B.E. Leake. Some metasomatic calc-magnesium silicate rocks from Connemara, western Ireland: mineralogical control of rock composition. Amer. Mineral. 65, 26–36.

65. 1980 R.J . Howarth & B.E. Leake. The role of data processing in the geological sciences. Sci. Progress, 66, 295–329.

66. 1980 B.W.D. Yardley, B.E. Leake & C.M. Farrow. The metamorphism of Fe-rich pelites from Connemara, Ireland. J. Petrology 21, 365–99.

67. 1980 A.N. Halliday, M. Aftalion & B.E. Leake. A revised age for the Donegal Granites. Nature, Lond. 284, 542–3.

68. 1981 D. Bremner & B.E. Leake. The geology of the Roundstone ultrabasic complex, Connemara. Proc. Roy. Irish Acad., 80B, 395¬-433.

69. 1981 B.E. Leake, P.W.G. Tanner & A. Senior. The geology of Connemara. 1:63,360 coloured geological map complete with cross-sections and accompanying map of the Fold traces and regional metamorphism in the Dalradian rocks of Connemara. University of Glasgow.

70. 1981 B.E. Leake. Thomas Neville George. Obituary notices in Year Book 1981, Roy. Soc. Edinburgh, 14–20.

71. 1981 B.E. Leake. Walter Frederick Whittard (1902–1966). Dictionary of National Biography 1961–70. (Ed. E.T. Williams & C.S. Nicholls) Oxford 1973–74.

72. 1981 B.E. Leake, C.M. Farrow & V.K. Nayak. Further studies on 'winchite' from the type locality. Amer. Mineral. 66, 625–31.

73. 1982 B.E. Leake. Volcanism in the Dalradian. In Igneous Rocks of the British Isles. Editor, D.S. Sutherland. Wiley, 45–50.

74. 1982 C.M. Farrow, A. Herriot & B.E. Leake. A Carboniferous arfvedsonite-aegirine trachyte from West Kilbride, Scotland. Mineral Mag. 46, 399–401.

75. 1982 B.L. Weaver, J. Tarney, B.F. Windley & B.E. Leake. Geochemistry and petrogenesis of Archaean metavolcanic amphibolites from Fiskenaesset, S. W. Greenland. Geochim. Cosmochim. Acta 46, 2203–2215.

76. 1983 B.E. Leake. Ultrametamorphism, migmatites, melting and granitoid formation. In Migmatites, melting and metamorphism (Eds. M.P Atherton & C.D. Gribble) Shiva, Nantwich, England, 2–9.

77. 1983 B.E. Leake, P.W.G. Tanner, D. Singh & A.N. Halliday. Major southward thrusting of the Dalradian rocks of Connemara, western Ireland. Nature 305, 210–13.

78. 1983 N.M.S. Rock & B.E. Leake. A FORTRAN program for the classification of amphiboles according to the International Mineralogical Association (IMA 1978) scheme. Instit. Geol. Sci. Petrology Unit, Petrographical Unit Report 5014, 1-71. Presented in title only.

79. 1984 B.E. Leake, P.W.G. Tanner, R.M. Macintyre & E. Elias. The tectonic position of the Dalradian rocks of Connemara: the Connemara nappe and the Midland Valley of Scotland. Trans. Roy. Soc. Edinb: Earth Sciences 75, 165–71.

80. 1984 N.M.S. Rock & B.E. Leake. The International Mineralogical Association amphibole nomenclature scheme: computerization and its consequence. Mineral. Mag. 48, p. 211-27.

81. 1985 Editor: B.E. Leake. Compiled by A. Greig. Cumulative index to the Quarterly Journal of the Geological Society and the Journal of the Geological Society. 147 pp.

82. 1985 P .C. Van de Kamp & B.E. Leake. Petrography and geochemistry of feldspathic and mafic sediments of the northeastern Pacific margin. Trans. Roy. Soc. Edinburgh: Earth Sciences 76, 411–49.

83. 1986 B.E. Leake. The geology of SW Connemara, Ireland: a fold and thrust Dalradian and metagabbroic-gneiss complex. J. Geol. Soc. Lond. 143, 221–36.

84. 1986 B.E. Leake, C.M. Farrow, F. Chao & V.K. Nayak. Winchite rediscovered from the type locality in India. Mineral. Mag. 50, 173–5.

85. 1986 B.E. Leake & D. Singh. The Delaney Dome Formation, Connemara W. Ireland, and the geochemical distinction of ortho- and para-quartzofeldspathic rocks. Mineral. Mag. 50, 205–15.

86. 1986 B.J. Bluck & B.E. Leake. late Ordovician to Early Silurian amalgamation of the Dalradian and adjacent Ordovician rocks in the British Isles. Geology 14, 917 -9.

87. 1986 F. Chao, C.M. Farrow & B.E. Leake. Polydymite and chrome-rich fuchsite in virginite from Baie Verte, Newfoundland. Mineral. Mag. 50, 723–4.

88. 1986 J.R. Graham, B.E. Leake & P.D. Ryan. The geology of South Mayo. 1:63,360 coloured geological map with cross-sections. University of Glasgow.

89. 1986 B.E. Leake. The geology of Slyne Head, Connemara. 1:10,560 coloured map with a cross-section. University of Glasgow.

90. 1987 B.J. Bluck & B.E. Leake. Reply of "late Ordovician to Early Silurian amalgamation of the Dalradian and adjacent rocks in the British Isles". Geology 15, 775–7.

91. 1987 B.E. Leake. Comments on 'Chromium-rich kyanite in an eclogite from the Rouergue area, French Massif Central': A1vi -rich amphibole. Mineral. Mag. 51, 752.

92. 1987 A.S. Janardhan, B.E. Leake, C.M. Farrow & G.R. Ravindra Kumar. The petrochemistry of the Archaean metasediments and metamagmatites around Sargur, South Karnataka. Indian Mineralogist 27, 166- 77.

93. 1988 E.M. Elias, R.M. Macintyre & B.E. Leake. The cooling history of Connemara, western Ireland, from K-Ar and Rb-Sr age studies. J . Geol. Soc. Lond. 145, 649–60.

94. 1988 M.D. Jagger, M.D. Max, M. Aftalion & B.E. Leake. U-Pb zircon ages of basic rocks and gneisses intruded into the Dalradian rocks of Cashel, Connemara, western Ireland. J. Geol. Soc. Lond. 145, 645–648.

95. 1988 B.E. Leake, E.M. Elias & C.M. Farrow. The relationship of argon retentivity and chemical composition of hornblende. Geochemica Cosmochima Acta 52, 2165.

96. 1988 B.E. Leake. Comments on the age of the Oughterard Granite, Connemara, Ireland. Geological Journal 23, 271- 2.

97. 1989 J .R. Graham, B.E. Leake & P .D Ryan. The Geology of South Mayo. Scottish Academic Press, Edinburgh 1- 74. 98,99. 1989 B.E. Leake. Petrochemical calculations; Statistics in Petrology. In Bowes, D.R. (Ed). The encyclopedia of igneous and metamorphic petrology. New York: Van Nostrand Reinhold 438–47; 547–9.

100. 1989 B.E. Leake. The metagabbros, orthogneisses and paragneisses of the Connemara Complex, western Ireland. J. Geol. Soc. London 146, 575–96.

101. 1990 B.E. Leake. Finding space for granite intrusions. Nature 343, 413.

102. 1990 Y. Ahmed-Said & B.E. Leake. S-type granite formation in the Dalradian rocks of Connemara, W. Ireland. Mineral. Mag. 54, 1¬-22.

103. 1990 B.E. Leake. Granite magmas: their sources, initiation and consequences of emplacement. J. Geol. Soc. London 147, 579–89.

104. 1990 R. Laouar, A. Boyce, A.E. Fallick & B.E. Leake. A sulphur isotope study on selected Caledonian granites of Britain and Ireland. Geological Journal 25, 359–69.

105. 1991 B.E. Leake. The geology of Errismore Connemara, Ireland. 1:10,560 coloured geological map. University of Glasgow.

106. 1991 W.M. Miller, A.E. Fallick, B.E. Leake, R.M. Macintyre & G.R.T. Jenkin. Fluid disturbed hornblende K-Ar ages from the Dalradian rocks of Connemara, western Ireland. J. Geol. Soc. London 148, 985–92

107. 1991 B.E. Leake. Thomas Neville George. Biographical Memoirs of Fellows of the Royal Society 37, 198- 217.

108. 1992 G.R.T. Jenkin, A.E. Fallick & B.E. Leake. Stable isotope study of retrograde alteration in SW Connemara, Ireland. Contributions to Mineralogy & Petrology, 110, 269–88

109. 1992 Y. Ahmed-Said & B.E. Leake. The composition and origin of the Kef Lakhal amphibolites and associated amphibolite and olivine-rich enclaves, Edough, Annaba, NE Algeria. Mineral. Mag. 56, 459–68.

110. 1992 A.A. Khudeir, M.A. El Haddad & B.E. Leake. Compositional variation in chromite from the Western Desert, Egypt, Mineral Mag. 56, 567 - 74.

111. 1992 B.E. Leake & E.J. Cobbing. Transient and long term correspondence of erosion level and the tops of granite plutons. Scottish Journal of Geology. 29, 177–82.

112. 1993 Y. Ahmed-Said & B.E. Leake. The Cap de Garde pelites and gneisses, Edough, Annaba, NE Algeria their petrology, geochemistry and origin. Bulletin du Service Géologique de l'Algérie, 4, 3-23.

113. 1993 Y. Ahmed-Said. G. Rogers & B.E. Leake. The petrology, geochemistry and petrogenesis of the Edough igneous rocks, Annaba, NE Algeria. J. African Earth Sciences, 17, 111–23.

114. 1993 B.E. Leake. [The development of teaching and research in Science in Glasgow University]: Geology. In A faculty for Science: A unified diversity (Ed. R.Y. Thomson) 159–178. University of Glasgow.

115. 1994 P .C. Van de Kamp, K.P. Helmold & B.E. Leake. Holocene and Palaeogene arkoses of the Massif Central France: mineralogy, chemistry, provenance and hydrothermal alteration of the type arkose. J. Sedimentary Research, A64, 17–33.

116. 1994 B.E. Leake & Y. Ahmed-Said. Hornblende barometry of the Galway batholith, Ireland: an empirical test. Mineralogy and Petrology, 51, 243–50.

117. 1994 B.E. Leake & P.W.G. Tanner. The geology: of the_ Dalradian and associated rocks of Connemara. western_ Ireland. Royal Irish Academy, Dublin. 96p plus 4 coloured maps.

118. 1994 K. Kocak & B.E. Leake. The petrology of the Ortakoy district and its ophiolite at the western edge of the Middle Anatolian Massif, Turkey. J. African Earth Sciences 18, 163–74.

119. 1994 P.C. Van de Kamp & B.E. Leake. Petrology, geochemistry, provenance, and alteration of Pennsylvanian - Permian arkose, Colorado and Utah. Geological Society of America Bulletin, 106, 1571–1582.

120. 1995 B.E. Leake, C. M. Farrow & R. Townend. K-poor titanian fluor-richterite from near Nullagine, Western Australia. American Mineralogist, 80, 162–4.

121. 1995 P .C. Van de Kamp & B.E. Leake. Petrology and geochemistry of siliciclastic rocks of mixed feldspathic and ophiolitic provenance in the Northern Apennines, Italy. Chemical Geology, 122, 1-20.

122. 1995 Y. Ahmed-Said & B.E. Leake. The petrogenesis of the Edough Muscovite orthogneisses, Annaba, NE Algeria. J. African Earth Sciences 21, 253–69.

123. 1995 M. Arslan & B.E. Leake. High- Ti biotite bearing ignimbrites from the Zilan Valley (Ercis-Van), Eastern Turkey. Mineral Mag. 59, 750–54.

124. 1995 Y. Ahmed-Said, B.E. Leake, L. Bouabsa & 0. Moulahoum. The Central Hoggar Taourirt and albite-topaz post pan-African Granites (Southern Algeria); their petrology, geochemistry and petrogenesis. Neues Jahrbuch für Mineralogie, Abhandlungen 170, 21- 57 .

125. 1996 Y. Ahmed-Said & B.E. Leake. The conditions of metamorphism of a grossular-wollastonite-vesuvianite skarn from the Omey Granite, Connemara, Western Ireland, with special reference to the chemistry of vesuvianite. Mineral. Mag. 60, 541–50

126. 1996 B.E. Leake. Geochemically unraveling the sedimentary components of Archaean metasediments from Western Australia. J. Geological Society, London, 153, 637–51.

127. 1996 P.C. van de Kamp & B.E. Leake. Petrology, geochemistry, and Na-metasomatism of Triassic-Jurassic non-marine clastic sediments in the Newark, Hartford and Deerfield rift basins, northeastern United States. Chemical Geology, 133, 89–124.

128. 1996 B.E. Leake contributor British Geological Survey. 1996. Knapdale Scotland Sheet 28E. Solid & Drift Geology. 1:50,000 Provisional Series (Keyworth, Nottingham: British Geological Survey).

129. 1997 B.E. Leake (chairman; 1st of 22 authors), Nomenclature of Amphiboles. Report of the Subcommittee on Amphiboles of the International Mineralogical Association Commission on New Minerals and Mineral Names. Mineral. Mag. 61, 295–321; Canad. Mineral. 35, 219–246; European J. Mineral. 9, 623–651; Amer. Mineral. 82, 1019–1037.

130. 1997 Y. Ahmed-Said & B.E. Leake. The petrogenesis of the Edough amphibolites, Annabar, NE Algeria; two unrelated basic magmas & the lherzolite-harzburgite residue of a possible magma source. Mineralogy and Petrology, 59, 207 -237.

131. 1997 P.C. van de Kamp & B.E. Leake. Mineralogy, geochemistry, provenance and sodium metasomatism of Torridonian rift basin clastic rocks, Northwest Scotland. Scottish J of Geology, 33, 105-¬124.

132. 1997 P.W.G. Tanner & B.E. Leake. Geology of the area around Clifden, Connemara, Western Ireland. 1:10,000 coloured geological map. University of Glasgow.

133. 1998 B.E. Leake. Widespread secondary Ca garnets and other Ca silicates in the Galway Granite and its satellite plutons, caused by fluid movements, W Ireland. Mineral Mag. 62, 381–386.

134. 2001 A. Mogessie, K. Ettinger, B. E. Leake & R. Tessadri. AMPH-IMA97: a hypercard program to determine the name of an amphibole from electron microprobe and wet analyses. Computers & Geosciences, 27, 1169–1178.

135. 2001 T. G. Jappy, B. E. Leake & A. E. Fallick. Relationships between hornblende K—Ar ages, chemical composition and hydrogen isotopes, Connemara, western Ireland: evidence for a massive extinct hydrothermal system. Journal of the Geological Society, London, 138, 843–854.

136. 2001 E. Ferre & B. E. Leake. Geodynamic significance of early orogenic High-K crustal and mantle melts: example of the Corsica Batholith. Lithos, 59, 47–67.

137. 2002 Y. Kawachi, D. S. Coombs, B. E. Leake & R. W. Hinton. The anhydrous amphibole ungarettiite from Woods Mine, New South Wales, Australia. European Journal of Mineralogy, 14, 375–377.

138. 2002 R. J. Howarth & B. E. Leake. The Life of Frank Coles Phillips (1902–1982) Geological Society of London Memoir 23, 104pp. doi:10.1144/GSL.MEM.2002.023.01.01. ISBN 978-1-86239-102-4.

139. 2003 B. E. Leake (first of 12 authors). Nomenclature of Amphiboles: additions and revisions to the International Mineralogical Associations's 1997 recommendations. Canadian Mineralogist, 41, 1425–1432.

140. 2003 B. E. Leake. Contributor to Geology of Galway Bay. Sheet 14. 1 : 100,000 coloured Geological Map of Ireland. Geological Survey of Ireland, Dublin.

141. 2003 B. E. Leake. Professor Robert Millner Shackleton, 1909–2001. Proceedings of the Geologists’ Association, 114, 157–162.

142. 2003 B. E. Leake. Professor John Graham Comrie Anderson, 1910–2002. Proceedings of the Geologists’ Association, 114, 275–278.

143. 2004 E. A. J. Burke & B. E. Leake. ‘Named Amphiboles’: a new category of amphiboles recognised by the International Mineralogical Association (IMA), and the proper order of prefixes to be used in amphibole names. Canadian Mineralogist, 42, 1281–3.

144. 2004 A. Mogessie, K. Ettinger & B. E. Leake. AMP-IMA04: a revised Hypercard program to determine the name of an amphibole from electron microprobe and wet chemical analyses according to the 2004 International Mineralogical Association scheme. Mineralogical Magazine, 68, 825–830.

145. 2004 A. Mogessie, K. Ettinger & B. E. Leake. IMA-Amphibole Classification Scheme. Coloured Wallchart published by the Mineralogical Society of Great Britain & Ireland.

146. 2004 J. F. Dewey & B. E. Leake. Professor Robert Millner Shackleton, (30 December 1909—3 May 2001). Biographical Memoirs of Fellows of the Royal Society of London, 50, 285–297.

147. 2004 B. E. Leake. Thomas Neville George (1904–1980). Dictionary of National Biography. Oxford University Press.

148. 2004 B. E. Leake. Walter Frederick Whittard (1902–1966). Dictionary of National Biography. Oxford University Press.

149. 2005 B. E. Leake. Wallace Spencer Pitcher, (1919–2004). Mineralogical Magazine 69, 217–218.

150. 2005 M. Pracht, A. Lees, B. E. Leake, M. Feely, B. Long, J. Morris & B. McConnell. The Geology of Galway Bay, to accompany the colour-printed 1:100,000 Geological map, Sheet 14, Geology of Galway Bay. Geological Survey of Ireland, Dublin.

151. 2005 J. Hunt, M. Feely, M. Yates & B. E. Leake. Hornblende barometry & P-T-t studies of the late Caledonian emplacement events (from ~410 to 380 Ma) in the Galway Granite Batholith, Connemara, Ireland. [Abstract] Halifax 2005. Meeting of the Canadian Geological Association, p. 91.

152. 2006 B. E. Leake. Mechanism of emplacement and crystallisation history of the northern margin and centre of the Galway Granite, western Ireland. Transactions of the Royal Society of Edinburgh, 97, 1-23. Includes a large, 270 km2 1:25,000 coloured geological map.

153. 2006 M. Feely, B. E. Leake, S. Baxter, J. Hunt & P. Mohr. Geological guide to the Granites of the Galway Batholith, Connemara, Western Ireland. Geological Survey of Ireland, Dublin. 62pp.

154. 2006 B. E. Leake. Wallace Spencer Pitcher, 1919–2004. Proceedings of the Geologists’ Association, 117, 311–319.

155. 2006 B, E, Leake. John Graham Comrie Anderson 26 April 1910—20 February 2002. In Review of the Session 2004–2005. Royal Society of Edinburgh, 197–203.

156. 2007 B. E. Leake, Introduction to, and ruminations on, the Bowes Festscrift. Proceedings of the Geologists’ Association, 118, 1–3.

157. 2007 B. E. Leake, Donald Ralph Bowes. Proceedings of the Geologists’ Association, 118, 5–10.

Book Reviews included from 2007 but not added to numbers; being indicated by a suffix letter

157A. 2007 B. E. Leake, Review in Geoscientist 17, Part 6 (June 2007) p. 17, of ‘Whatever is under the Earth; the Geological Society of London 1807 to 2007 G. L. Herries Davies. Geol Soc. Lond.

158. 2008 B. E. Leake, Wallace Spencer Pitcher 3 March 1919—4 September 2004. Royal Society of Edinburgh Review 2007. 302-306.

159. 2007 B. E. Leake, Review of Hawthorne et al. 2007. Amphiboles: Crystal chemistry, Occurrence and Health Issues. Reviews in Mineralogy, 67, 545pp. In Mineralogical Magazine 71,591-592.

160. 2008 B. E. Leake, Wallace Spencer Pitcher (1919–2004): an appreciation. In Plutons & Batholiths, Transactions .of the Royal Society of Edinburgh: Earth Sciences, 97, vii-xii.

161. 2008 B. E. Leake, JW Gregory, explorer and polymathic geologist: his influence in Glasgow and on the British rejection of continental drift. Proceedings of the Geological Society of Glasgow, 150th Anniversary Special Edition, 16-21

162. 2009 B. E. Leake & P. Bishop, The beginnings of Geography Teaching and Research in the University of Glasgow: the impact of J.W. Gregory. Scottish Geographical Journal, 125, 272-283.

162A. 2009 B. E. Leake, Book review of Vernon, R. H. & Clarke, G. L. 2008. Principles of Metamorphic Petrology. Camb. Univ.Press, 446pp. in Mineralogical Magazine, 72, 145-6.

162B. 2009 B. E. Leake, Book Review of Ogg, J. G., Ogg, G. & Gradstein, F. M. 2008. The Concise Geological Timescale. Camb. Univ. Press, 177pp, in Geoscientist, 19, Part 4, (April 2009), p.23.

163. 2011 B. E. Leake, Obituary Notice: Rhys Glyn Davies, 1923-2010. Proceedings of the Geologists’ Association, 122, 530–532; & Geoscientist, 21, Part 3, (April 2013), p. 26.

163A. 2011 B. E. Leake, Book Review, Once upon a Time in the West; The Corrib Gas Geoscientist, 21, Part 4 (April 2011), p. 23.

164. 2011 B. E. Leake, The Life and work of Professor J. W. Gregory FRS (1864–1932); Geologist, Writer and Explorer. Geological Society Memoir 34, 234 + x pp +94 figs. ISBN 978-1-86239-323-3

165. 2011 B. E. Leake, Stoping and the mechanisms of emplacement of the granites in the Western Ring Complex of the Galway Granite batholith, western Ireland. Transactions of the Royal Society of Edinburgh: Earth & Environmental Sciences, 102, 1–16, including a 1:25,000 coloured geological map of the Ring Complex.

166. 2011 B. E. Leake, Obituary Notices: Gerald Manfred Friedman (1921–2011). Proceedings of the Geologists’ Association, 123, 669–670; Geoscientist, 22, Part 6 (June 2012), 28.

167. 2012 B. E. Leake, Major thrusting in the granite and the role of late intrusions in exposing the deeper parts of the Central Block of the Galway Granite batholith. Irish Journal of Earth Sciences, 30, 1–12. Includes a 1:25,000 coloured geological map.

168. 2013 B. E. Leake, Obituary Notices: Peter Edwin Negus (1929–2012). Proceedings of the Geologists’ Association, 124, 552–3.

168A. 2013 B. E. Leake. Book review of Faulting, Fracturing and Igneous Intrusion. D. Healy, R. W. H. Butler, Z. K. Shipton & R. H. Sibson (Editors) 2012, 253pp. Geological Society of London Special Publication 367. In Geoscientist, 23, Part 8 (Sept 2013), p. 23.

169. 2013 B. E. Leake, Arthur Clive Bishop and Richard John Howarth. The Wyley History of the Geologists’ Association in the 50 years 1958–2008. The Geologists’ Association, 139pp.

170. 2014 D. R. Kanungo, D. B. Malpe & B. E. Leake. Manganocummingtonite from the Mesoproterozoic Sausar fold belt, Central India. Journal of the Geological Society of India, 84, 93–99.

171. 2014 B. E. Leake, A new map and interpretation of the geology of part of Joyces Country, Counties Galway and Mayo. Irish Journal of Earth Sciences, 32, 1–19. Includes a large 1:25,000 coloured geological map.

172. 2015 B. E. Leake, Obituary: John Baker 1927–2014. Geoscientist, 25 Part 1 February 2015, p. 26.

172A. 2015 B. E. Leake, Book Review. Sorby's Legacy: Geology at the University of Sheffield. R. Alison Hunter. 2013, 201pp. Geoscientist, 25, March 2015, p. 24.

173. 2015 B. E. Leake. Dr Douglas Grant (1918–2014). Scottish Journal of Geology, 51, 2–4. Also: Douglas Grant 6 January 1918 – 25 July 2014. Royal Society of Edinburgh Review of the Sessions 2013–4 and 2014–5, on website.

174. 2016 C. Bishop, B. E. Leake, & A. Poole. Obituary: Dr Bill French. Magazine of the Geologists’ Association, 15, (1), 20. Also Geoscientist, 26, April 2018 No. 3, 28.

175. 2016 B. E. Leake, C. Bishop & A. Poole. Obituary: William John French (1934–2015). Proceedings of the Geologists’ Association, 127, 110–2.

176. 2016 B. E. Leake. The metabasites and garnet amphibolites of Glencolumbkille, Co. Donegal and the early mafic intrusions into the Dalradian rocks of Donegal, Connemara and Scotland. Irish Journal of Earth Sciences, 34, 1–17. Also doi:http://dx.doi.org/10.3318/IJES.2016.34.2

177. 2017 B. E. Leake. Obituary: James Brooks, Geoscientist, 27, No. 10 (Nov.), p. 28.

178. 2017 M. Feely, B. E. Leake, A. Costanzo, P. Cassidy & B. Walsh. Sapphire occurrences in Connemara: field and mineralogical descriptions from an erratic, and from bedrock pelitic xenoliths in the Grampian Metagabbro-Gneiss Suite. Irish Journal of Earth Sciences, 35, 45–54. Also doi:http://doi.org/10.3318/IJES.2017.35.45

179. 2017 B. E. Leake. From Geology Department to School of Earth & Ocean Sciences: a record of the staff over 125 years (1891–2016) of Geological Science research and teaching in Cardiff. 282pp. Mss bound & in the Geological Society Library; on the Cardiff University Intranet (but not the open University web as translation into Welsh desired).

180. 2017 B. E. Leake. From red to black lines and how it was achieved: a personal recollection of the finances and formats of the QJGS–JGS and QJEG, 1950–88 and the formation of the GSL Publishing House. 34pp. Geol. Soc. Figshare Portal, https://doi.org/10.6084/m9.figshare.c.3937939

181. 2018. B. E. Leake. Obituary: Norman Edward Butcher (1928–2017) Proceedings of the Geologists’ Association, 129, 95–6. http://doi.org/10.1016/pgeola.2017.12.001

181. 2018 B. E. Leake & S. Munro. Obituary: Norman Edward Butcher (1928–2017). Annual Report & Proceedings 2016–17. Edinburgh Geological Society, p. 19–20. Fuller version http://www.edinburghgeolsoc.org/home/obituaries/

182. 2018 B. E. Leake. Obituary: Howard Bartlett (1952–2018). Magazine of the Geologists’ Association, 18, No.4, 13.

183. 2019 B. E. Leake. Obituary: Reginald Bradshaw (1924–2019). Proceedings of the Geologists’ Association, 130, 650–1. http://doi.org/10.1016/j.pgeola.2019.05.006

184. 2019 K. Downs-Rose & B. E. Leake. New light on the Geology of the Roundstone intrusion and that of the Grampian metagabbro-gneiss complex, Connemara, Western Ireland. Irish Journal of Earth Sciences, 37, 33–59. https://doi.org/10.3318/IJES.2019.37.4

185. 2020 B. E. Leake. Obituary: Reginald Bradshaw (1924–2019) Geoscientist, 30, Part 1 (Feb.) 30

185A. 2020 B. E. Leake. Book Review. Himalayan Tectonics: A Modern Synthesis. P. J. Treloar & M. P. Searle (Editors) 2019. The Geological Society, Special Publication 483, 669pp. Geoscientist, 30, Part 6 (June) p. 21 & online.

186. 2021 B. E. Leake. The Geology of the Clifden district, Connemara, Co. Galway, Ireland and present understanding of Connemara Geology.(Geological map included) Irish Journal of Earth Sciences, 39, p. 1-28 doi: https://doi.org/10.3318/IJES.2021.39.1

186A. 2021 B. E. Leake Book Review. Post-Archean Granitic Rocks: Petrogenetic processes & Tectonic environments. V. Janousek et al. (Eds) 2020. The Geological Society, Special Publication 491, 298pp. Geoscientist, 31, Part 3 (Autumn), p. 53 & online.

187. 2022 Feely, M., McCarthy, W., Costanzo, A., Leake, B. & Yardley, B. The Late Silurian to Upper Devonian Galway Granite Complex (GGC): pp 303–362. In Ryan, P. D. (editor) A Field Guide to the Geology of Western Ireland. Springer Nature Switzerland

188. 2022 Leake, B. E. & Roberts D. Obituary: Donald MacDonald Ramsay (1932 – 2022), Structural geologist who made a major impact on Scottish and Norwegian geology. Geological Society, 2022 Online https://www.geolsoc.org.uk/About/History/Obituaries-2001-onwards/Obituaries-2022/Donald-MacDonald-Ramsay

189. 2023
