= John-Philippe Smith =

Canadian artist and sculptor (born 1963)

John-Philippe Smith is a Canadian artist and sculptor. He has been the sixth person to hold the office of Dominion Sculptor of Canada since 2021, a position whose duties include the creation of original works of art in sculpture.

Before working in Dominion Sculptor's office directly, Smith and his Ottawa colleague Danny Barbour were contracted to restore portions of West Block in the early 2010s.

== Education ==
- Bachelor of Arts from the University of Ottawa.
- Diplomas in Heritage Masonry from Algonquin College, 2003 & 2004.

== Awards and Honours ==
- Alumni of Distinction: Creative Arts and Design, Algonquin College, 2024.

== Notable works ==
- (2022) Elizabeth II memorial maquette, installed in the Senate of Canada.

== Dominion Sculptor ==
Smith worked with his predecessor, Phil R. White, in a project in 2011 and again from 2018 until White's retirement in 2021.

Political offices
Preceded by Phil R. White	Dominion Sculptor of Canada; 2021-	Succeeded by Incumbent
