= Peter Kokelaar =

British volcanologist

B. Peter Kokelaar
- Education: University of Wales (BSc, PhD); University of Oxford (MSc)
- Awards: Murchison Medal (2013)
- Scientific career
- Fields: Volcanology
- Workplaces: Ulster University; University of Liverpool
- Thesis: The igneous history of the Rhobell Fawr area, Merioneth, North Wales. (1977)

Peter Kokelaar is a British volcanologist, known for his field studies of volcanoes and volcanic processes ancient and modern. He was awarded the Murchison Medal of the Geological Society of London in 2013.

== Early life and education ==
Kokelaar was born on the Gower Peninsula, Wales, and went to Penclawdd Junior School, Gowerton Grammar School and then at Llandaff Technical College, Cardiff. Kokelaar studied geology at Aberystwyth University, gaining a BSc, and then studied for an MSc in geochemistry at the University of Oxford. He subsequently returned to Aberystwyth University, where he completed a PhD on the Ordovician volcanic rocks of the Harlech dome, Snowdonia. Kokelaar worked at Ulster University for ten years, before moving to the University of Liverpool as Reader in Geology. He was later appointed the George Herdman Professor of Geology. Kokelaar retired in 2014.

== Career ==
Kokelaar is known for his field studies of volcanic deposits and volcanic processes, in both ancient geological settings and geologically-young volcanoes. He has studied aspects of submarine volcanism, and submarine deposition of volcanic rocks. He has worked extensively on the mechanisms of caldera collapse, both at the ancient volcanoes of Glencoe and in the British Lake District. In the late 1990s, Kokelaar was involved in the formal assessment of the UK government's response to the eruption of the Soufriere Hills volcano, on the eastern Caribbean island of Montserrat.

In 1996, Kokelaar presented a case on behalf of the Friends of the Earth to the Sellafield public planning enquiry, laying out the complexity of the bedrock conditions in the Borrowdale Volcanic Group, and presenting the case against the then plans by UK NIREX Ltd to construct a rock characterisation facility as a part of a plan for an underground repository for the radioactive waste disposal. Plans for the waste disposal facility were not approved.

In 2013, Kokelaar was awarded the Murchison Medal by the Geological Society of London in recognition of his contributions to volcanology.

In retirement, Kokelaar continues to research and write. He published a book on the landscape and water resources of the Gower peninsula, All our own water in 2021.

== Selected bibliography ==
- Kokelaar, B.P.; Howells, M.F., eds. (1984). Marginal Basin Geology: Volcanic and Associated Sedimentary and Tectonic Processes in Modern and Ancient marginal Basins. Geological Society of London, Special Publications. Vol. 16. ISBN 0632010738.
- Branney, Michael J.; Kokelaar, Peter (2002). Pyroclastic density currents and the sedimentation of ignimbrites. Geological Society of London, Memoir. Vol. 27. ISBN 9781862391246.
- Druitt, T.H.; Kokelaar, B.P., eds. (2002). The eruption of the Soufriere Hills Volcano, Montserrat from 1995 to 1999. Geological Society of London, Memoir. Vol. 21. ISBN 1862390983.
