= William Abbott Herdman =

Scottish marine zoologist, oceanographer

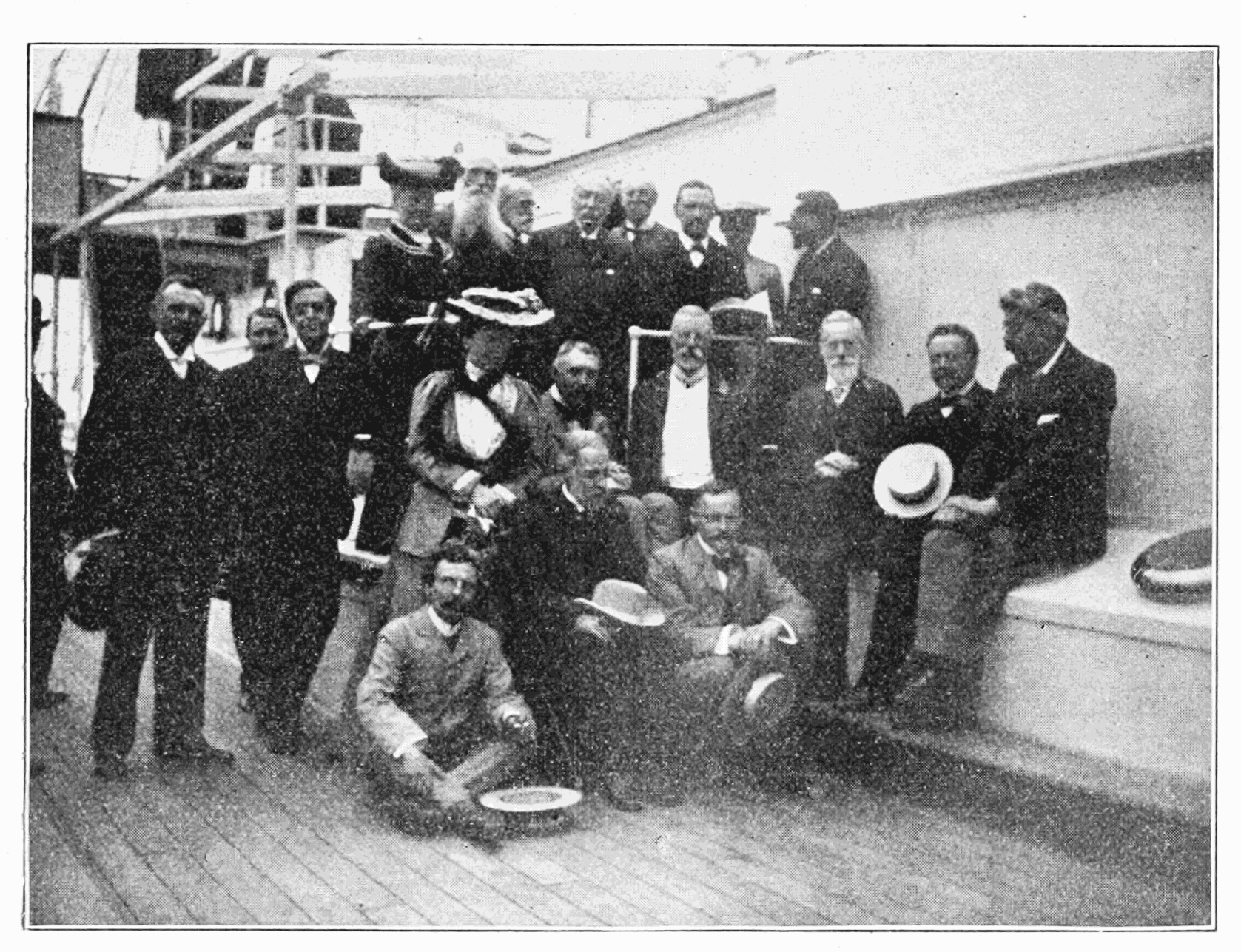
British Association members of the voyage around Africa 1905. W.A. Herdman and his wife are left in the middle row.

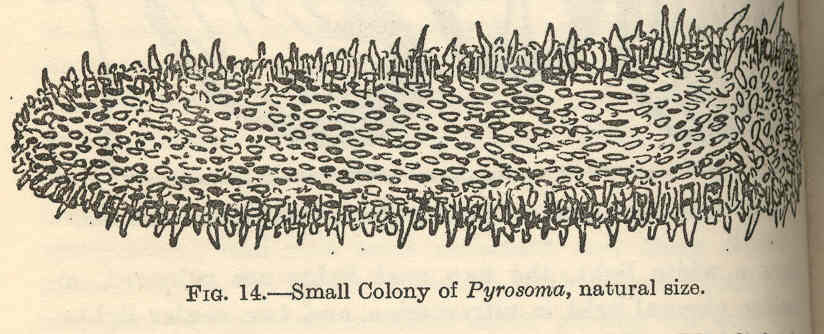
Small Colony of Pyrosoma: illustration by W A Herdman

Sir William Abbott Herdman FRS FRSE FLS (5 September 1858, Edinburgh – 21 July 1924) was a Scottish marine zoologist and oceanographer.

His zoological author abbreviation is Herdman.

== Early life and education ==
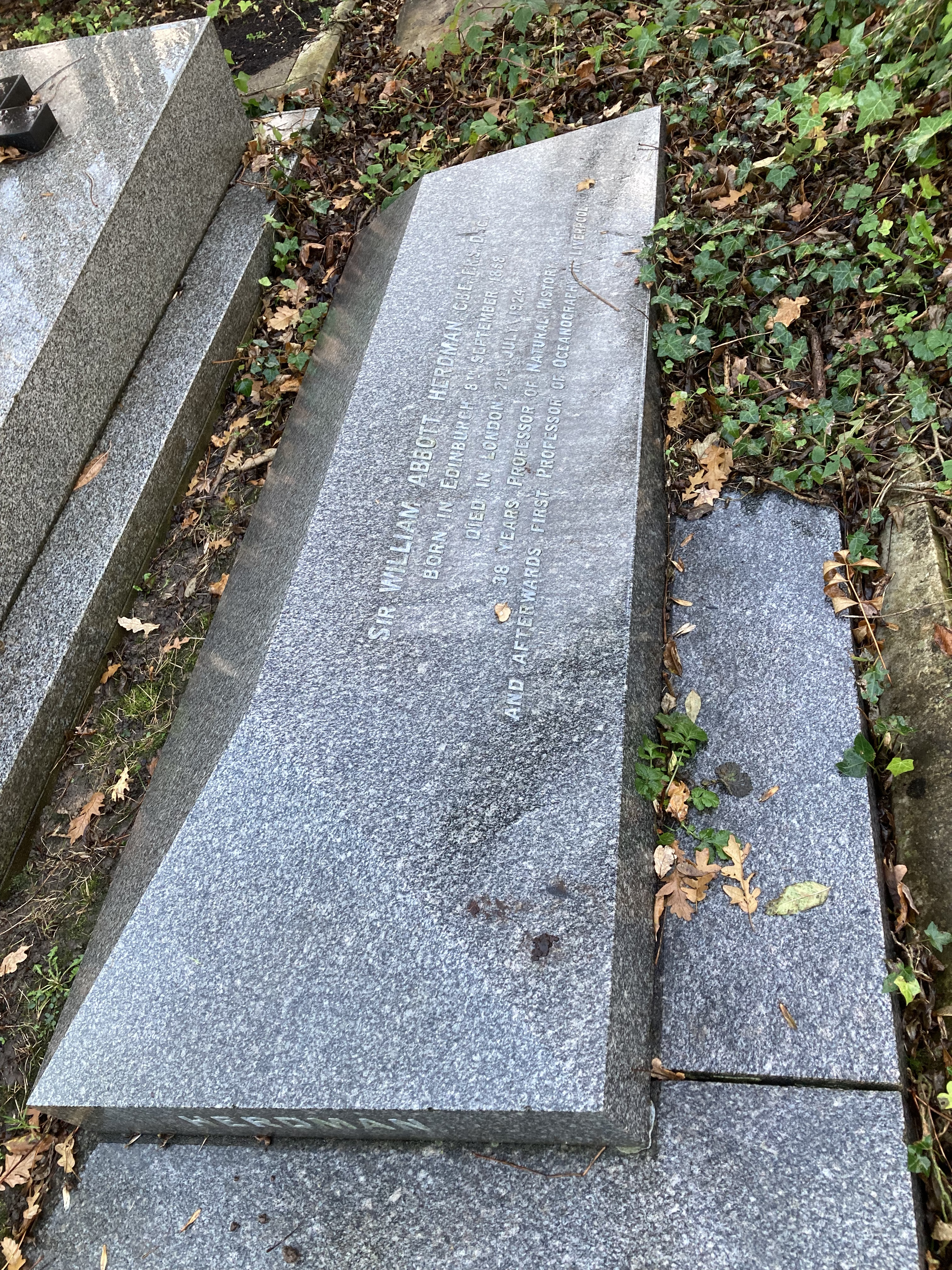
Grave of Sir William Abbott Herdman in Highgate Cemetery

He was born in Edinburgh the son of the artist Robert Herdman RSA and his wife, Emma Abbott. He was educated at Edinburgh Academy from 1870 to 1875.

== Academic career ==
Archibald Geikie taught him geology during his time at the University of Edinburgh. Herdman graduated BSc in 1879 and became the assistant of Sir Charles Wyville Thomson. In this capacity he was placed as Secretary to the Challenger Expedition Commission: overseeing the deciphering of the huge catalogue of information found during this important exploration.

In 1880, he became Demonstrator of Zoology at the University of Edinburgh and then, in 1881, the first holder of the Derby Chair of Natural History at Liverpool University College (later to become the University of Liverpool). In 1881 he was elected a Fellow of the Royal Society of Edinburgh. His proposers were Sir Charles Wyville Thomson, Sir William Turner, Sir Archibald Geikie and Sir John Murray. He won the Society's Neill Prize for the period 1880–1883.

In 1890, he founded the research station at Puffin Island off the north Wales coast, appointing Philip Jacob White as its director.

He devoted himself from 1891 to the organization of a laboratory for study of the sea. He endowed the Herdman chair of geology in 1916 and then a chair of Oceanography in 1919. He was the author of Founders of Oceanography and Their Work: An Introduction to the Science of the Sea (1923) and made many contributions to the scientific study of the fauna of the Irish Sea. He was also interested in fisheries and in 1901-1902, he studied the harvesting of pearls in Ceylon, during which time he discovered the harpacticoid copepod Syngastes twynami. He was a specialist in tunicates.

Herdman was elected a Fellow of the Royal Society in 1892. He served as president of the Linnean Society from 1904 to 1908. He was the president of the British Association for 1919–1920. He was knighted in 1922.

== Death ==
He died in London on 21 July 1924 and was buried in the eastern section of Highgate Cemetery on 25 July 1924.

== Family ==
He married twice: firstly in 1882 to Sarah Wyse Douglas (1861-1886), daughter of David Douglas, publisher and bookseller, and secondly in 1893 to Jane Brandreth Holt (1867–1922), daughter of the shipping merchant Alfred Holt.
