= Emma Holt =

British philanthropist (1862-1944)

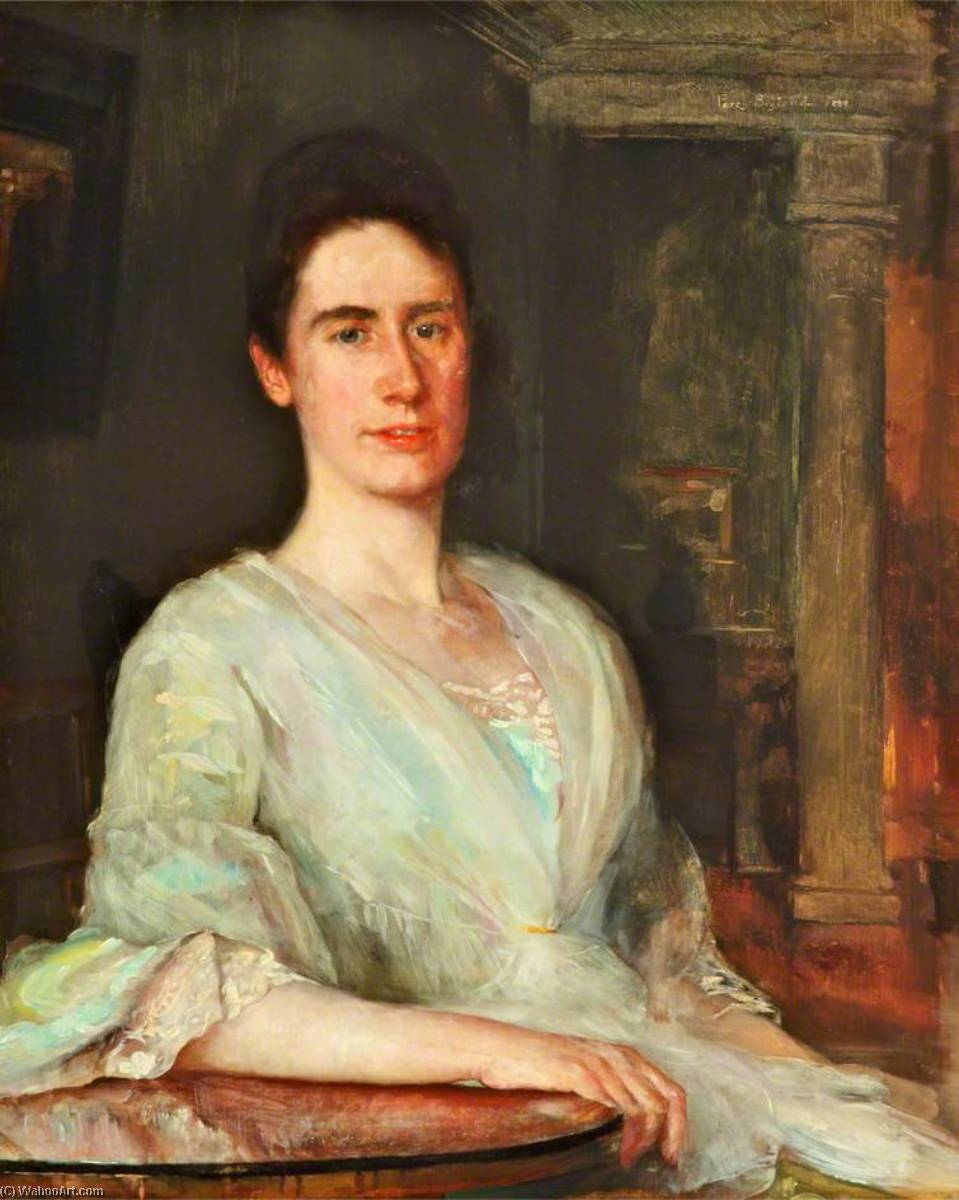
- in 1889, by Percy Bigland
- Born: Emma Georgina Holt; 10 January 1862; West Derby
- Died: 19 December 1944 (aged 82); Coniston
- Known for: philanthropy and an advocate for women's education

Emma Holt (10 January 1862 – 19 December 1944) was a British philanthropist and supporter of women's education. She was seen as Liverpool University's "Fairy Godmother".

== Life ==
Holt was born in West Derby (now in Liverpool). She was the only child of Elizabeth (born Bright) and George Holt. Her father was co-founder of the Lamport and Holt shipping Line and he was a strong supporter of University College, Liverpool. Holt attended lectures there on architecture in 1884 and 1900-1901. Her family were Unitarians and she was a strong supporter of the Reverend John Hamilton Thom who was minister at the Renshaw Street Unitarian Chapel on Mount Pleasant in Liverpool. She became a leader of that chapel. In 1894 Thom died and the chapel began its move to Ullet Road where Holt continued as one of its leaders.

In 1883, she and her parents moved into Sudley House and this would be her home until she retired. Her father died in 1896 and her mother in 1920.

In 1889 Percy Bigland completed a portrait of her and it is in the Sudley House collection.

In 1896 her father died and she and her mother continued and expanded the family's philanthropy.

In 1909 she joined the council of the University of Liverpool and apart from a year gap in 1915–16 she served there until 1934. The university had been created in 1903 and she was unusual being a woman on the university's council in addition to being a life governor of the university and University College. The university recognised her contribution when they granted an honorary doctorate of laws in 1928. More widely she was seen as the university's "fairy godmother" finding few peers to her generosity except maybe Belfast's Eliza and Isabella Riddel.

Holt died on 19 December 1944 at her home in Coniston where she had retired. She bequeathed a painting by John Everett Millais, Landscape, Hampstead, to the Walker Art Gallery in Liverpool.
