= George Holt (cotton-broker) =

British cotton merchant

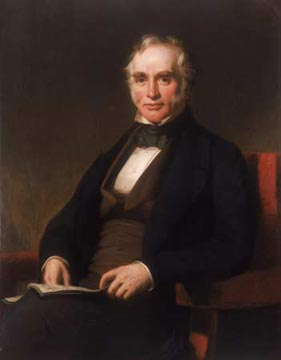
George Holt, senior. Oil on canvas, 1851, by Phillip Westcott c1850. resides in Sudley House.

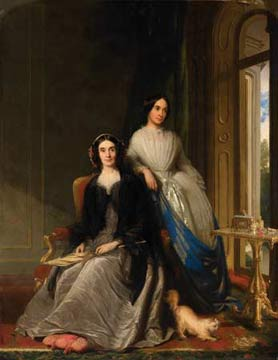
Emma Durning Holt, wife of George, and his daughter Anne. Oil on canvas, c. 1856, by Philip Westcott.

George Holt (24 June 1790 – 16 February 1861) was a cotton-broker, merchant, and philanthropist from Liverpool, England.

== Early life ==
George Holt's father, Oliver, had moved from Halifax after impressing the owner of Town Mill in Rochdale with his work ethic and skills as a woollen dyer. The ethic, derived from a nonconformist, principally Baptist, milieu, helped him rise to become a partner in the business before establishing his own mill and dyeworks in the town. Born on 24 June 1790, George left Rochdale for Liverpool in 1807 to work as an apprentice to Samuel Hope, who was a cotton broker. In 1812, having demonstrated similar qualities to those of his father, he became a partner in Hope's business, which at the time also involved banking.

The prosperity that Holt enjoyed caused him for a while to enjoy the company of men who favoured sporting pastimes. However, his nonconformist background came to the fore again when he became friendly with William Durning around 1817, having rented a cottage from another member of the Durning family. On 1 September 1820, he married William's daughter, Emma. Durning was a wealthy Liverpool wine and spirit merchant, and through the marriage, George Holt became part of a group of influential Unitarian business people. Holt himself became a convert to Unitarianism due to the influence of his wife.

Holt and his family worshipped at Renshaw Street Unitarian Chapel, which has been described as "the meeting house for a tightly knit network of Unitarian ship owners and merchants who frequently formed alliances by marriage, met socially, invested in one another's ventures, shared or exchanged practical skills, embarked on philanthropic (especially educational) schemes, and engaged fully in the politics of reform".

== Career ==
Holt became a successful cotton broker in his own right after ending his partnership with Hope on 30 June 1823. His firm, George Holt & Co., was based first next to that of Hope on Water Street and then on Chapel Street. It returned to Water Street in 1834, occupying newly built premises that he had financed and which he named the India Building to celebrate the end of the East India Company's monopoly on trade in the Far East. (Note: The original India Building was later replaced by India Buildings, financed by his son, Alfred.) By 1837, he had capital of £76,000, including £26,000 in his business, £28,000 in the India Building, and £7,800 in railway investments.

Water Street was also the location of the head office of the Bank of Liverpool, which Holt founded with others in 1831. He was also involved in founding a company in 1836 that was intended to provide cheaper insurance for the handling and storage of merchants' goods. (Note: Sources name the company both as the Liverpool and London Assurance Company and the Liverpool Fire and Life Assurance Company.)

Holt also founded Blackburne House in the city as a school for girls in 1844. In addition, he had a long-term involvement with the city's docks and water committees and was president of the newly formed Liverpool Cotton Brokers' Association in 1842.

== Death and legacy ==
George Holt died on 16 February 1861; his wife, who was born on 20 February 1802, died on 7 July 1871.

Three of Holt's six sons became noted shipowners and merchants: Alfred Holt, Philip Henry Holt and George Holt Jr. The youngest son, Robert Durning Holt, worked in his father's cotton-broking business and became Mayor of Liverpool, while another, Oliver, died in childhood. There were also two daughters, Anne (1821–1885) and Emma Jane, who died in childhood in 1842.

Holt wrote a memoir titled A brief memoir of George Holt, esquire of Liverpool which was edited and privately published by Anne in 1861. It was reprinted in Cambridge in 1995.

== See also ==
- John Benjamin Smith
