= Robert Durning Holt =

English cotton-broker and local politician

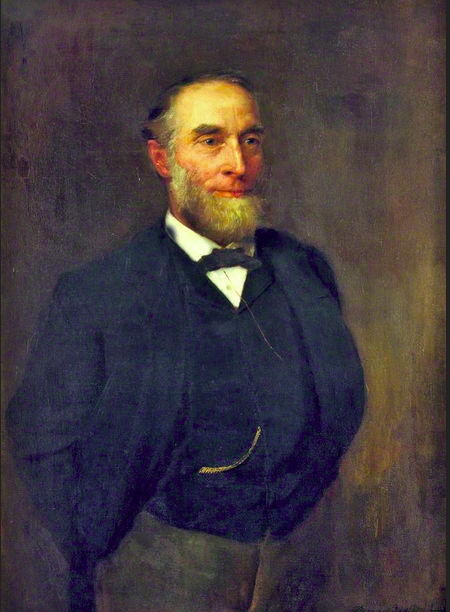
Robert Durning Holt (1832–1908). Oil on canvas by Percy Bigland, ca. 1891.

Robert Durning Holt (11 October 1832 in Liverpool – 10 December 1908) was an English cotton-broker and local politician. He was Mayor of Liverpool and the first Lord Mayor of Liverpool (1892–1893).

Holt was the youngest of five sons of George Holt and Emma Durning and worked first in his father's cotton-broking business. Among his brothers were George Holt, who co-founded the Lamport and Holt shipping line, Philip Holt, and Alfred Holt, founder of the Blue Funnel Line. All were Unitarians.

Robert Durning Holt married Lawrencina Potter, daughter of railway magnate Richard Potter and Lawrencina Heyworth, and older sister of Beatrice Webb. One of their sons was the national politician Sir Richard Durning Holt, 1st Baronet, while another was Lawrence Durning Holt, who also became a Lord Mayor of Liverpool.
