= Philip Rodney White =

Philip Rodney White (25 July 1901 – 25 March 1968) was an American botanist and agricultural scientist.

Born on July 25, 1901, in Chicago, Illinois, as one of twins, he studied in France and Germany before receiving his PhD from Johns Hopkins University. During 1930 and 1931, he worked in Berlin at the laboratory of Gottlieb Haberlandt. Most of White's research was on using plant tissues to grow viruses. He died in Bombay, India, while on a lecture tour, on March 25, 1968.
