= George Holt (merchant) =

British businessman (1825–1896)

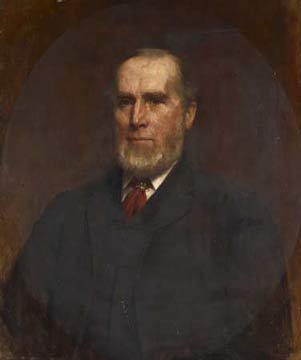
George Holt, junior. Oil on canvas, 1892, by Robert E. Morrison

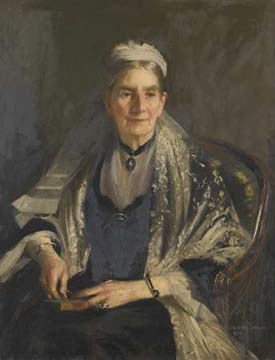
Presentation portrait on the 80th birthday of Elizabeth Holt, widow of George Holt. Oil on canvas, 1913, by George Henry

George Holt (1825 – 3 April 1896) was a Victorian ship owner, merchant and art collector from Liverpool. Together with William James Lamport, he founded the Lamport and Holt shipping line in 1845.

== Life ==
Holt was a son of George Holt and Emma Durning. He married fellow Liverpudlian Elizabeth Bright on 1 December 1853 and died on 3 April 1896. The Holts lived initially at Edge Lane, and then in West Derby before moving in 1884 to Sudley House in Aigburth, Liverpool. They had one child, Emma Holt, who was born in 1862, inherited the property and lived there until her death in 1944. Her mother, who was born in 1833, had died in 1920.

Among his brothers were Alfred Holt (1829–1911), founder of the Blue Funnel Line, Philip Holt (1830–1914), and Robert Durning Holt, the first Lord Mayor of Liverpool. There was also a sister, Anne. All were Unitarians.

Aside from business interests and his role with the Mersey Docks and Harbour Board, Holt was very involved with and supportive of both the experimental work of the physicist Oliver Lodge and the Liverpool Physical Society. He donated over £40,000 to University College, Liverpool, which was the precursor of the University of Liverpool, including endowments for professorial chairs in physiology and pathology, and for research studentships in medical sciences. The University of Liverpool's George Holt Building, which currently houses five laboratories of the university's department of computer science, is named after him. His wife and daughter, Emma Holt, contributed £10,000 towards the total £24,000 cost of erecting the building, which opened in 1904 Elizabeth and Emma would in time donate their time, paintings, furniture and over £30,000 to the university.There is a Halls of Residence at Edge Hill University called Holt in his honour.

He was President of Manchester College, Oxford (now named Harris Manchester College) from 1894 to 1896.
