= Philip Jacob White =

British physician and zoologist

Philip Jacob White FRSE (1863–26 December 1929) was a 19th-century British physician and zoologist.

== Life ==
He was born in Purandhar in 1863, the son of the Rev Adam White (1829-1864), a missionary for the Free Church of Scotland in India, originally from Aberdeen. His father died of cholera, contracted from Hindu pilgrims at Sassoor, the year after his birth and Philip then returned to Scotland with his mother, Jane Littlejohn White (1832-1917).

He was educated at Fettes College then studied medicine at the University of Edinburgh graduating with an MB ChB in 1887. Part of his studies included zoology and he was prizeman for his year in that field. Given this, he obtained a post as assistant lecturer in the natural history section of the University following graduation, becoming a lecturer in 1889, establishing a new course in Practical Zoology.

In 1889 he began lecturing at University College, Bangor in Wales. In 1890 he took on the additional role as Director of the Biological Research Station on Puffin Island off the north Wales coast, being appointed by Prof William Abbott Herdman. In 1895 he instituted the first course in Agricultural Zoology at Bangor.

In 1896 he was elected a Fellow of the Royal Society of Edinburgh. His proposers were James Cossar Ewart, Sir William Turner, Andrew Gray, and John Chiene.

A few months after election he accepted a post as Professor of Zoology at University College, Bangor in Wales.

He died on Boxing Day, 26 December 1929.

== Publications ==
- Algae : article in 11th edition of Encyclopedia Britannica
