= Phil R. White =

Canadian artist and sculptor (born 1963)

Phil R. White (born 1963) is a Canadian artist and sculptor. He was the Dominion Sculptor of Canada from 2006 until 2021, a position whose duties include the creation of original works of art in sculpture. His works are primarily in figurative art. He is an architectural sculptor and carver and creates works in stone, wood, and bronze.

== Early influences ==
Born in Peterborough, Ontario, in 1963, White was raised in an artistic environment where he was encouraged to be creative. He began carving wood and sculpting at a very young age. His initial inspiration was a master stonemason and wood carver – his grandfather. Later, sculptor Bill Reid and other Haida artists became a major influence. White looked at these works during many family trips to British Columbia.

At age 17, he sold his first pieces in commercial art galleries in the Peterborough area and later in Toronto, Ontario. He participated in several group shows at Whetung Gallery and Art Loft Gallery from 1982 to 1986.

At Sir Sandford Fleming College, he studied art conservation techniques. Later in the 1980s, he continued his studies for three years at the Canadian Conservation Institute. There he focused on art history, conservation and historical artifacts' restoration, conservation theory, metal and woodworking techniques and traditional finishes.

== Early career ==
After graduation, he pursued a career in conservation and museum collection management with both the Canadian War Museum and the Canadian Museum of Civilization in Ottawa. This period laid the foundations for White's work as Dominion Sculptor, where part of his job is the restoration of architectural sculpture on Parliament Hill.

== At the Canadian War Museum ==
As Exhibit Artist at the Canadian War Museum, White created sculptures and decorative arts for exhibitions and presentations for both museums. He received commissions to create a series of sculptures in wood, which were later exhibited at the museum. Other projects included the 1998 installation of 18 sphinxes on the courtyard of Canadian Museum of Civilization for the Mysteries of Egypt exhibit. His commission to commemorate the 50th anniversary of the Canadian Women's Army Corps (CWAC), Athene Based on his mother's experiences as a CWACs, the statue portrays a soldier waiting for a train to start a journey that will give her experiences of war and change her life irrevocably.

Based on photographs of Paul Manson, former Chief of the Defence Staff (Canada), he created a bronze sculpture of a Cold-War era fighter pilot entitled "QRA scramble". It is currently on exhibit in the Canadian War Museum's permanent galleries.

After he completed the design for the coat of arts for the Canadian War Museum, his interest in heraldic art and sculpture deepened. His design features hands raising a book, maple leaves, poppies, and a key. "The book represents military research and the key is a reminder of the museum's role in protecting the country's military collection and unlocking knowledge," White said.

As a result of this work, he received commissions for heraldic carving for Rideau Hall, the Canadian Heraldic Authority, the Canadian Bar Association, and the Canadian Nurses Association.

== Dominion Sculptor ==
White applied to a national competition that was held for Dominion Sculptor. "The guardians of sculpted antiquities in Canada's public buildings especially those on Parliament Hill and the source of much original ornamentation for historic buildings left un-embellished at their time of construction," the role encompasses the care of architectural sculpture that already exists and creating original works.

He received the appointment in 2006.

White is the fifth sculptor to hold this position. Created in 1936 by the Department of Public Works, the position's mandate is to carry out the decorative work planned by John A. Pearson, the architect of Parliament Hill's Centre Block.

Rebuilt after the Great Fire destroyed the original building in 1916, Pearson designed the Centre Block with the express intention that future generations of sculptors would create stone carvings and sculptures from stone blocks in the building's interior. White oversees that work and creates original additions, in collaboration and with the approval of the offices of the Speaker of the House of Commons (Canada) and the Speaker of the Senate (Canada). Notwithstanding the longstanding "rule against partisan subjects" in decorative work on Parliament Hill, within the confines of Neo-Gothic traditions, the position contains considerable scope to create original works.

More than 25 different types of stone and marble were used in the building's construction, but much of the exterior carving is done in Tyndall limestone from Manitoba and Indiana limestone. Inside, the history and traditions of Canada are reflected in many stone carvings. This work represents the ongoing intermittent work of over 60 sculptors and carvers since 1916.

Since his appointment, key projects White has produced include a portrait of Her Majesty Queen Elizabeth II in bronze for the House of Commons and a portrait of the Queen in stone, for the Senate Foyer in 2010. Both filled what had been a void inside the Houses of Parliament, since there are several sculptural representations of Canada's previous monarchs, notably in the Senate foyer.

But with the notable exception of John Harman's equestrian statue of the Queen located on the grounds outside, there were no publicly owned sculptural representations of Canada's reigning monarch inside the Parliament buildings.

White returned to military themes with a commission to produce a series of six carved oak panels depicting insignia of the Canadian Forces. These were later installed in a meeting room used by the House of Commons Veterans Affairs Committee in Centre Block.

White has also created two bronze busts of Sir Sandford Fleming for the lobbies of Fleming College in Peterborough Ontario, and Lindsay, Ontario, and a plaster bust of Fleming for the Haliburton School of the Arts.

Commissioned to create a portrait of Elizabeth II for the Department of National Defence & the Royal Canadian Mint in the year of her Diamond Jubilee, White based his portrait on the earlier ones he did for Parliament Hill. But in this portrait, carved in Dura stone, the Queen wears two insignia: Sovereign of the Order of Canada and of the Order of Military Merit (OMM).

Displayed in National Defence Headquarters in Ottawa, the portrait was commissioned to commemorate the 40th anniversary of the Order of Military Merit. It recognizes "conspicuous merit and exceptional service by members of the Canadian Forces."

On 27 June 2012, White was awarded the Queen Elizabeth II Diamond Jubilee Medal.

White worked with his successor, John-Philippe Smith, from 2018 until his retirement in 2021.

Political offices
Preceded by Maurice Joanisse	Dominion Sculptor of Canada; 2006–2021	Succeeded by John-Philippe Smith
