= Sudley House =

Historic house and museum in Liverpool, England

Coordinates: 53.3735°N 2.9214°W

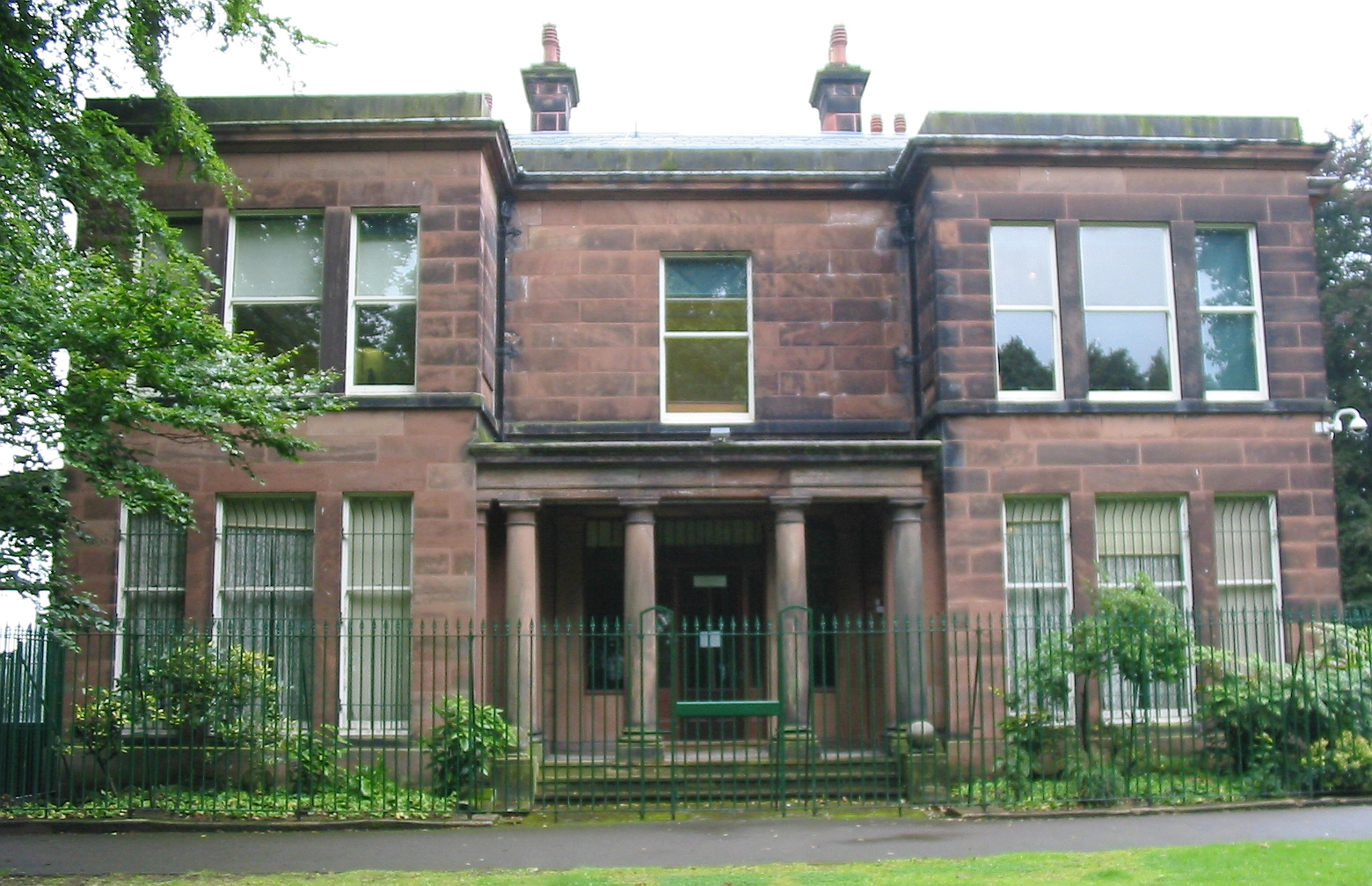
North facade of Sudley House

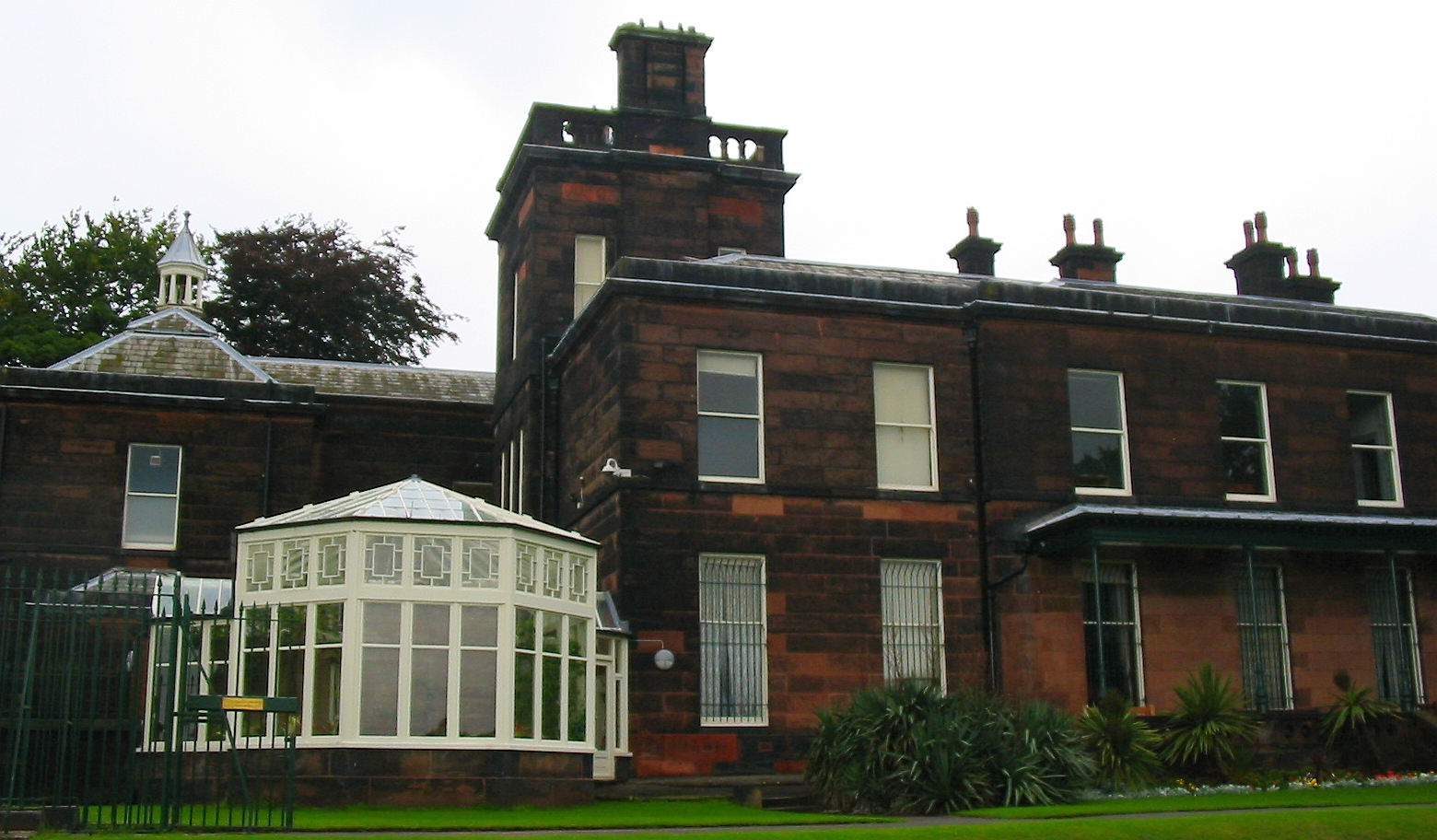
South facade of Sudley House

Sudley House is a historic house in Aigburth, Liverpool, England. Built in 1824 and much modified in the 1880s, it is now a museum and art gallery which contains the collection of George Holt, a shipping-line owner and former resident, in its original setting. It includes work by Thomas Gainsborough, Joshua Reynolds, Edwin Landseer, John Everett Millais and J. M. W. Turner.

The house was bequeathed to the city of Liverpool by Holt's daughter, Emma Georgina Holt, in 1944 and is managed by National Museums Liverpool.

== History ==
=== Structure ===
Sudley, as it was originally known, was completed in 1824 on land formerly owned by the Tarleton family as a two-storey ashlar house for Nicholas Robinson, a corn merchant who was Lord Mayor of Liverpool in 1828–29. Robinson paid £4500 for the land.

Upon the death of Robinson in 1854, the house passed to his two daughters, who died in 1883. The house and estate, comprising just under 30 acres (12 ha), was put up for sale in 1880. It became the home of Victorian shipping-line owner and merchant George Holt in 1884. Pevsner says that the original design was probably by John Whiteside Casson and was modified by James Rhind when Holt purchased it. However, National Museums Liverpool say that the original architect is unknown, although there are features that suggest it may have been Thomas Harrison.

The structural modifications, which involved moving the main entrance from the east facade to that of the north and also adding an office wing on the west, have significantly affected the interior. The original staircase with Doric fluted columns, above which is a dome and glazed oculus, became exposed and, according to Pevsner, this has left the surrounding internal features as "a bit of a mess". The new two-storey wing added two bays to the five that already existed on the south side, as well as a parapeted prospect tower to its rear.

=== Art and life ===
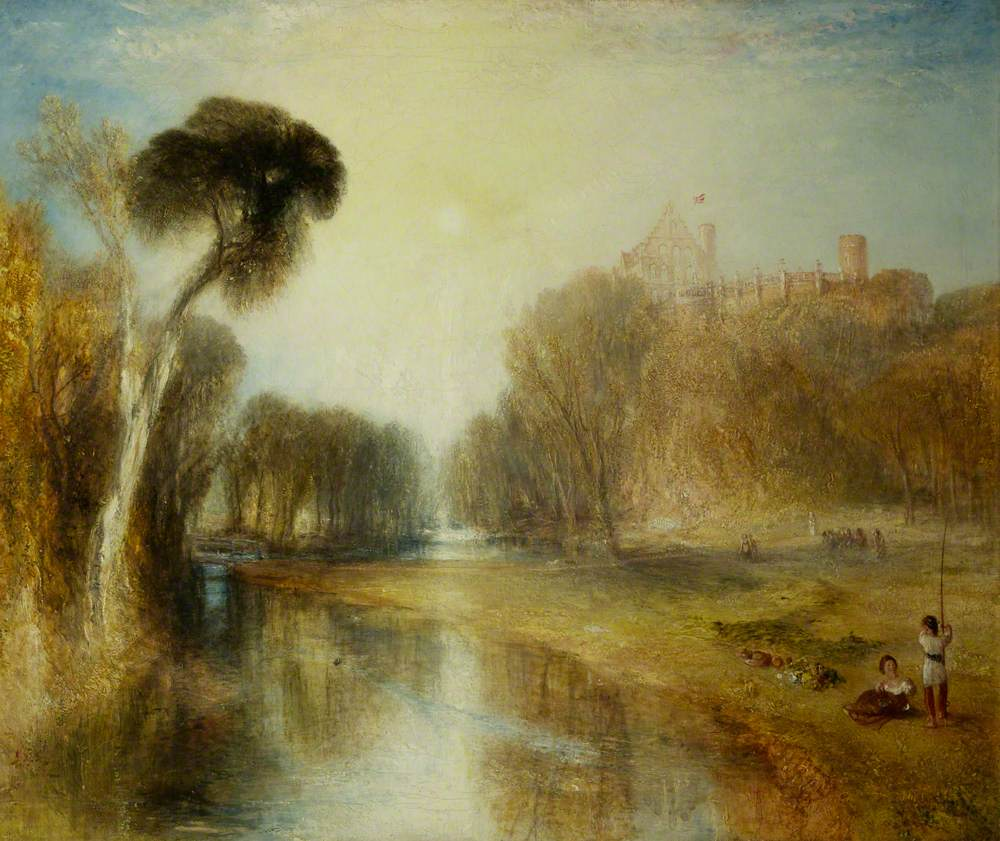
Schloss Rosenau by J.M.W. Turner, 1841

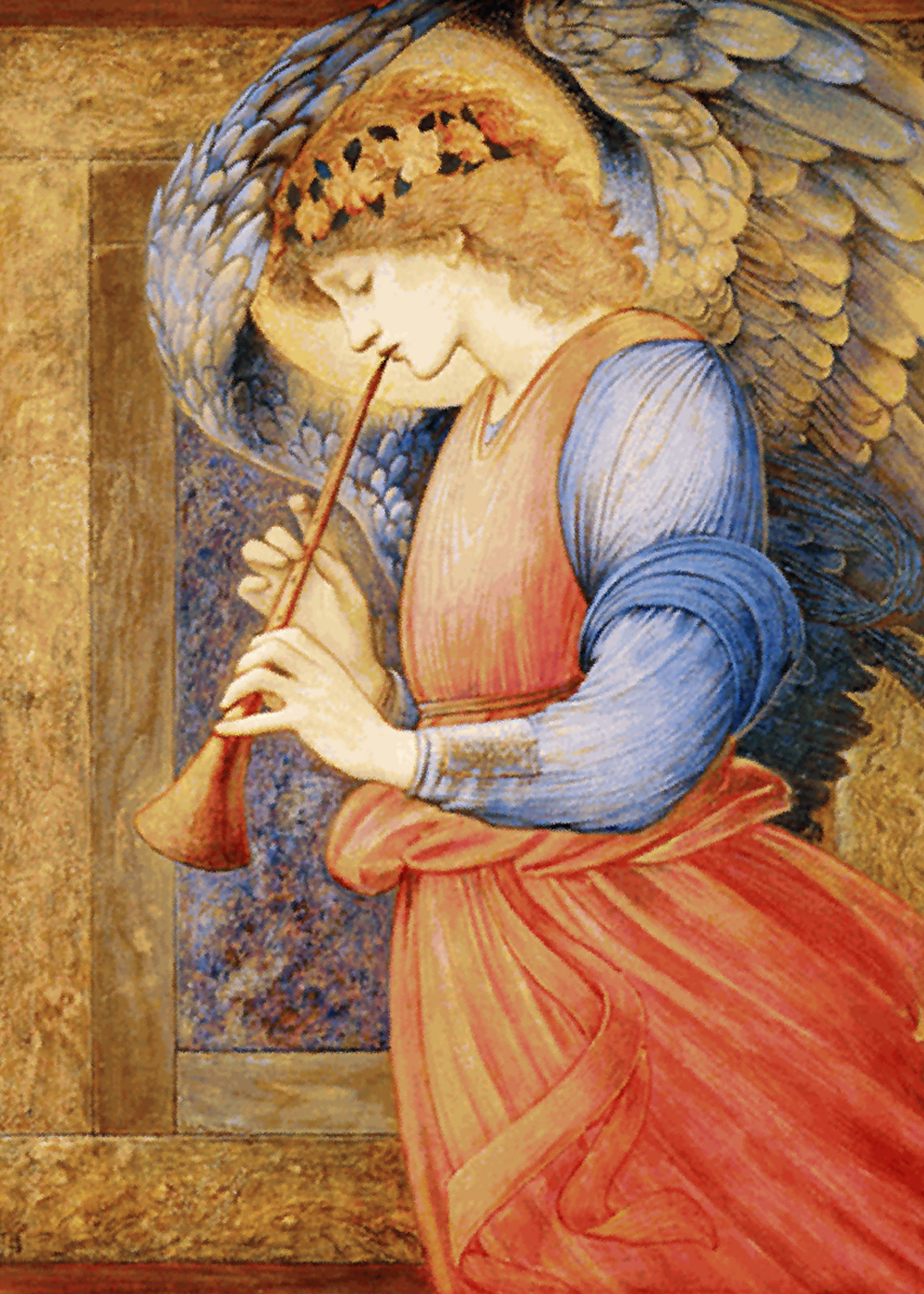
An Angel Playing a Flageolet by Edward Burne-Jones, in the collection of Sudley House

George Holt was an art collector whose collection derived mainly from purchases from dealers and at exhibitions rather than from commissions. Among his most significant purchases, which remain in the house today, were J. M. W. Turner's Schloss Rosenau, depicting Prince Albert's home in Germany, and Gainsborough's Viscountess Folkestone. Also among the collection are paintings by Richard Parkes Bonington, Edwin Landseer, John Everett Millais, Joshua Reynolds, George Romney and the Pre-Raphaelites.

George Melly, the jazz singer, critic and art historian, who was related to the Holt family, has described aspects of life at Sudley House during his various childhood visits in the 1930s, when it was owned by George Holt's only child, Emma Georgina Holt. According to Melly, her father, who died in 1896, had left an estate valued at over £600,000.

The house and the art collection, which is described by ArtUK as being "the only British collection of its kind still in its original setting", were bequeathed to the city in 1944 by Emma Holt and is now (2016) managed by National Museums Liverpool.

== Refurbishment ==
Sudley House closed for two years for a £1 million refurbishment, re-opening on 26 May 2007. This included redecorating in the Aesthetic style of George Holt's era and also significantly modifying the first floor, where three new attractions were incorporated as follows:

- Two childhood rooms: how Victorian children learned and played. Exhibits include a large Victorian dolls' house, educational toys, fashion dolls and pots used at mealtimes by rich and poor children.
- A costume room: regularly changing displays of historic clothing. One such exhibition showed a small part of the vast collection of Emily Tinne and her children, which is held by National Museums Liverpool.
- A gallery for temporary exhibitions

Pevsner says that those modifications create an architectural "tension" between showing the house as a house and as a museum. The ground floor library now includes a display about the Holt family. This includes an introductory film, family portraits and a model of the steamer Verdi, which belonged to the Lamport and Holt shipping company that George Holt had co-founded in 1845.

== See also ==
- Vanessa (Millais painting)
