= Ashley Gilbank =

Ashley Gilbank (born in Pontypool, Ontario), started a charitable campaign in 2012 titled Skate4Life 2012. A hockey player herself, part of her activity with the charity involved skating from one end of Canada to another in the space of five months starting June 4 until late October.

== Skate4Life ==
The 2012 objective for her charity was to inline skate from St. John's, Newfoundland to Victoria, British Columbia. She began the trek on June 4, 2012, and successfully completed it at "Mile 0" of the Trans Canada Highway, Victoria, British Columbia, in early October. The hope is to raise awareness and funds for Do It For Daron and youth mental health. Her motivation to start the charity and raise money for DIFD was based on the loss of a childhood friend to suicide in February 2011. Her friend, a university rugby player, had suffered a brain injury when she was hit by a car while jogging.

She prepared by training in 2011 for the journey. Prior to the beginning of her journey, she dipped a wheel in the Atlantic Ocean in Newfoundland on June 4. Her journey began in St. John's, Newfoundland on June 4, 2012. By July 1, Gilbank arrived in Fredericton, New Brunswick. During her skate through Eastern Canada, Gilbank covered 60 to 80 kilometres a day. In Newfoundland, she managed 100 kilometres in one day. Prior to arriving in New Brunswick, Gilbank fought the elements of wind, rain, heat, along with construction work.

On July 18, 2012, Gilbank arrived at Parliament Hill, having skated through 3,000 kilometres of Canadian roads. She was met by supporters wearing purple DIFD shirts at Parliament's Centennial Flame. Celebrity guests included Do It For Daron founder Luke Richardson and Ottawa City Councillor Alan Hubley (representing the district of Kanata South). Both men have lost a child to suicide. Do It For Daron was created to honour the life of the late Daron Richardson. Gilbank and Richardson played in the same hockey league. Upon her arrival in Ottawa, Skate4Life had only raised just under $2,000, with the goal being $60,000. On August 1, 2012, she reached the community of Hastings, Ontario, home to her grandparents. The nearby Campbellford and District Mental Health Centre helped raise $1,100 for her charitable cause. Due to fatigue, Gilbank was hospitalized on August 7, while in Ontario.

== Personal ==
At the age of 13, she was diagnosed with Acid Reflux Disease. She attended secondary school in Lindsay, Ontario and played competitive hockey. She was a former member of the Kidsport Ottawa Board of Directors. In addition, she has participated in ball hockey in the Ottawa area. Her husband was one of the campaign volunteers and her brother Andrew Gilbank helped out from Ottawa. Ashley's husband followed her in a van throughout her cross-country trek and assisted in collecting donations.

=== Film making ===
In February 2011, Gilbank, and her brother Andrew claimed that an ad that appeared during Super Bowl XLV looked like a pitch they had made. The brother and sister are amateur film makers and entered the Doritos and Pepsi MAX "Crash the Super Bowl" contest, in which contestants submitted homemade ads for consideration. A video was made featuring her pet dog (a pug) barking at a window as he watches her brother eat Doritos. Her brother gets into a car only to find the pet dog waiting in the backseat.

The Gilbanks claimed the video never successfully loaded on the contest website. The eventual winner made a video called Pug Attack and won $1 million. Their ad was posted to YouTube. Messages left with Doritos parent company were not returned.
