= Ellen Kenna House =

Mansion in Oakland, California, US

Coordinates: 37°47′42″N 122°14′27″W

The Ellen Kenna House is a historic Victorian mansion in Oakland, California. It was built in 1888. It is 8,500 square feet. It was built by the widow of a murdered gold miner. Architect Augustus Laver who also designed the James C. Flood Mansion that is now home to the Pacific Union Club was its architect.

It is at 1218 East 21st Street. In 2016 it sold to an investor for $1.95 million. It was used as a home for girls with syphilis. It has been used for film and catalogue shoots. It is in the Clinton neighborhood. It is being used as a co-living space and includes gardens.

== See also ==
- List of Oakland Designated Landmarks
