= Yeovil Town =

Yeovil Town may refer to:

- Yeovil, a town in Somerset, England, with a council named Yeovil Town
- Yeovil Town F.C., an English football team based in Yeovil, Somerset
- Yeovil Town W.F.C., an English women's football team affiliated with Yeovil Town F.C.
- Yeovil Town Ladies, a former English women's football team, now known as Bridgwater United W.F.C.
- Yeovil Town railway station, a defunct railway station that served the town of Yeovil
- Yeovil Town House, a Grade II listed municipal building in Union Street in Yeovil
