= Thomas Stent =

American architect

- Born: 1823; England
- Died: 1912 (aged 88–89); Los Angeles, California, US
- Citizenship: British subject in Canada; American
- Occupation: Architect
- Practice: Stent & Laver, Stent, Dixon and Desaldern, Stent and Lang, Strangevand Stent
- Buildings: Old San Francisco City Hall

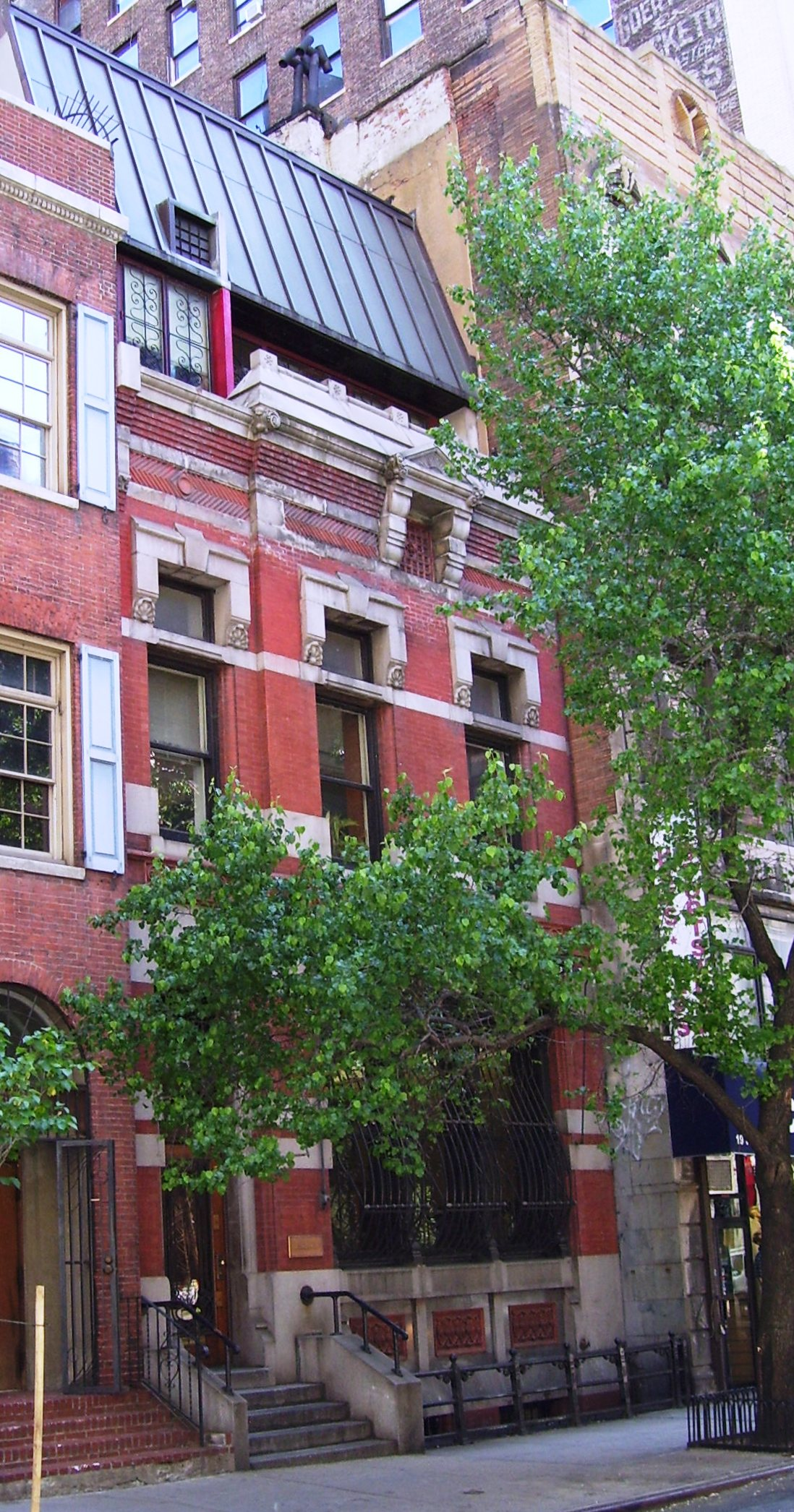
21 West 26th Street, designed by Thomas Stent

Thomas Stent (1822–1912) was a British-born architect who worked professionally in Canada and the United States. He assisted Alexander Saeltzer on the Astor Public Library (later merged 1895 into the current New York Public Library), and was the architect for its 1879–1881 expansion.

Stent was born in 1822 and trained in England, and practised there before traveling to London, in what was then Canada West, in 1855. In 1858, he moved to the capital at Ottawa.

In 1857 he redesigned Tiffany Castle built in 1840 for Gideon Tiffany in Delaware Township, of Middlesex County, Ontario. The house was renamed as "Belvoir" (pronounced as "Beever") in 1880 and was owned by Helen Gibson Weld's grandfather, Richard Albert Gibson (1840–1911).

At Parliament Hill in Ottawa, the team of Thomas Stent and Augustus Laver (1834–1898), under the pseudonym of Stat nomen in umbra, won the prize for the second category, which included the new Canadian parliamentary buildings of the East and West Blocks. These proposals were selected for their sophisticated use of Gothic architecture, which was thought to remind people of parliamentary democracy's history. This contrasted with the republican use in the 19th (and later early 20th centuries) of Neo-classical/ Classical Revival styles of architecture with white marble, as used in Washington, D.C., and was more suited to the rugged surroundings of the still wilderness in the north of North America, while still also being stately and impressive for governmental buildings. $300,000 was allocated for the main building, and additional $120,000 for each of the departmental buildings.

Stent and Laver's partnership also won the competition decades later to build the monumental San Francisco City Hall in San Francisco, California, U.S.A. It was designed in the then popular elaborate Beaux Arts/ modified Classical Revival styles of architecture. It was unusually large topped by a tall dome, more resembling a typical state or national capitol than a city hall. It was completed in 1898, but destroyed eight years later by the Great San Francisco Earthquake and Fire of April 1906.

== Works ==
- Yeovil Town House, Yeovil, Somerset, England 1849
- Expansion of the Astor Library Building, New York City, New York, US 1879–1881

With Augustus Laver:

- East Block and West Block, Ottawa, Ontario, Canada 1859–1866
- San Francisco City Hall 1871-1899
