= East Block =

Office building on Parliament Hill in Ottawa

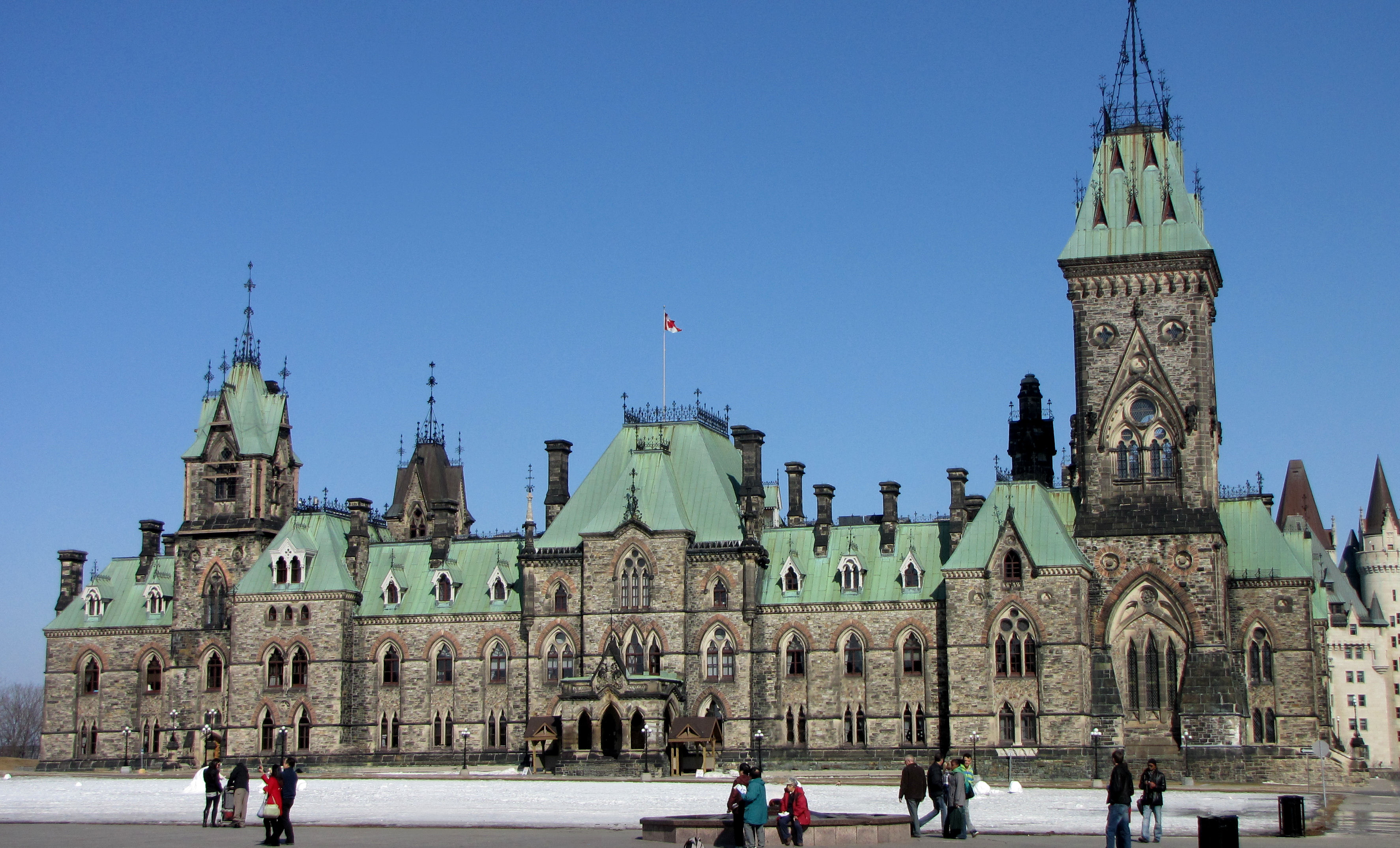
- The East Block of Parliament Hill

General information
- Architectural style: Victorian High Gothic
- Location: Ottawa, Ontario, Canada
- Coordinates: 45.424709°N 75.697453°W
- Construction started: 1859
- Completed: 1866
- Client: The Queen in Right of the United Kingdom (1859); The Queen in Right of Canada (1867)
- Owner: The King in Right of Canada

Design and construction
- Architects: Thomas Stent and Augustus Laver

The East Block (officially the Eastern Departmental Building; French: Édifice administratif de l'est) is one of the three buildings on Canada's Parliament Hill, in Ottawa, Ontario, containing offices for parliamentarians, as well as some preserved pre-Confederation spaces.

Built in the Victorian High Gothic style, the East Block is, along with the Library of Parliament, one of only two buildings on Parliament Hill to have survived mostly intact since original construction. Though not as renowned as the Centre Block of parliament, the East Block formerly appeared on the face of the Journey Series design of the Canadian hundred-dollar bill. The East Block is open to the public for tours in July and August.

== Characteristics ==
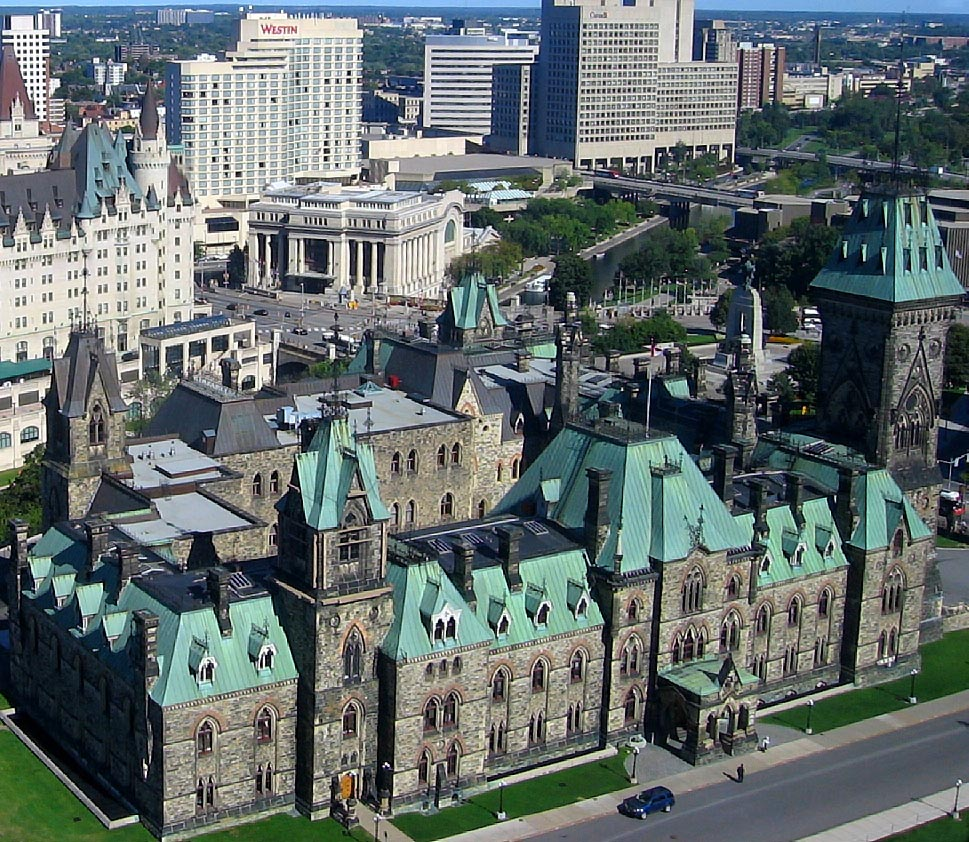
The East Block as viewed from the observation platform of the Peace Tower

Designed by Thomas Stent and Augustus Laver, the East Block is an asymmetrical structure built in the Victorian High Gothic style, with load-bearing masonry — being nearly 0.9 m (3 ft) thick at the ground level, expanding to 2.1 m (7 ft) thick at the base of the main tower. These are all clad in a rustic Nepean sandstone exterior and dressed stone trim around windows and other edges, as well as displaying a multitude of stone carvings, including gargoyles, grotesques, and friezes, keeping with the style of the rest of the parliamentary complex.

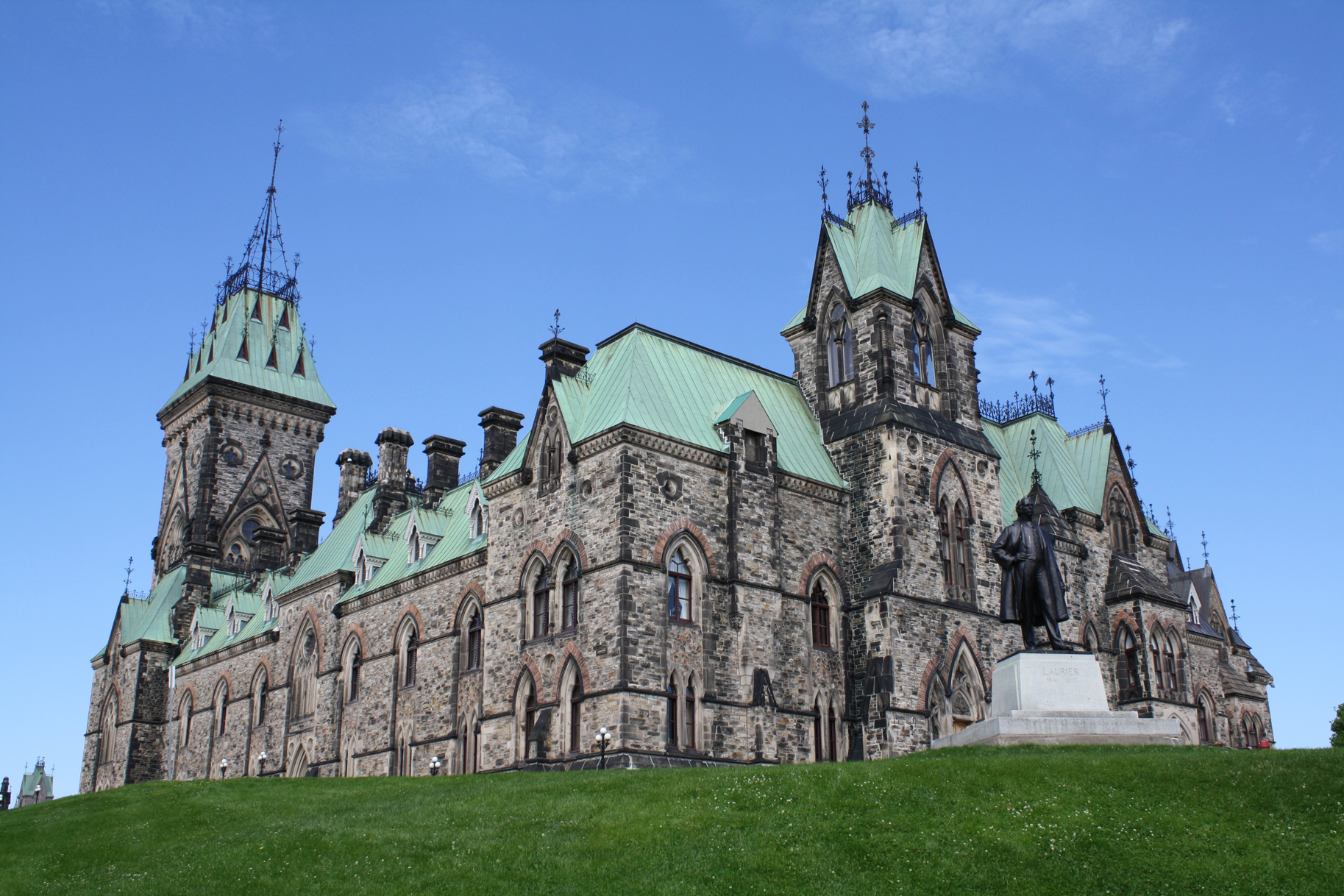
The rear of the East Block

This detail continues on the interior of the East Block, where emblems, such as wheat sheaves, were carved in stone originally to indicate the various government departments housed nearby. The level of quality and luxury of the offices initially indicated the status of the inhabitant: large, wood panelled chambers with marble fireplaces and richly decorated plaster ceilings served for ministers of the Crown; intricate, but somewhat less detailed cornices were sufficient for senior bureaucrats; and basic, machine-made woodwork and concrete fireplace mantels filled rooms set aside for clerks. Though much of the original decor has been retained or restored, the spaces have been reorganized so that the East Block now houses, as well as ministers, members of parliament, senators, and parliamentary administrators. Corridors and entranceways are also lit by windows filled with stained glass, and contemporary adaptations of the original gas fixtures adorn the walls. Beneath the decor stand 0.6 m (2 ft) wide, double-wythe masonry partitions with a rubble fill core, and concrete floors more than 0.3 m (1 ft) thick.

The main historic spaces in the East Block are restored to reflect the period around 1872. The former office of the Governor General of Canada contains its original furnishings, and the woodwork, fireplace, and plasterwork are finished as they would have been just a decade after Confederation. The office that had been occupied by Sir John A. Macdonald contains a blue-grey Arnprior marble mantle, and the Prime Minister's furniture occupies the room. The previous King's Privy Council for Canada chamber holds a reproduction of the original table made at Upper Canada Village, above which hangs the same chandelier that hung there before the Second World War.

== History ==
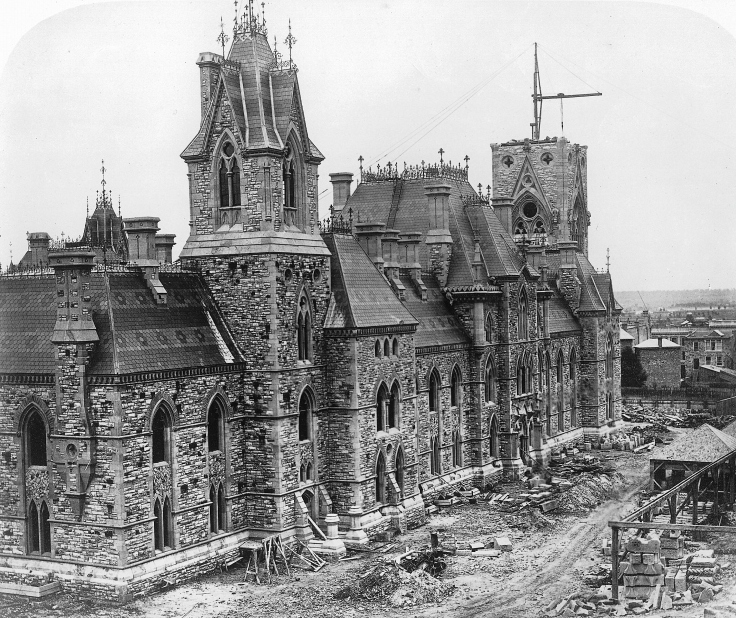
East Block

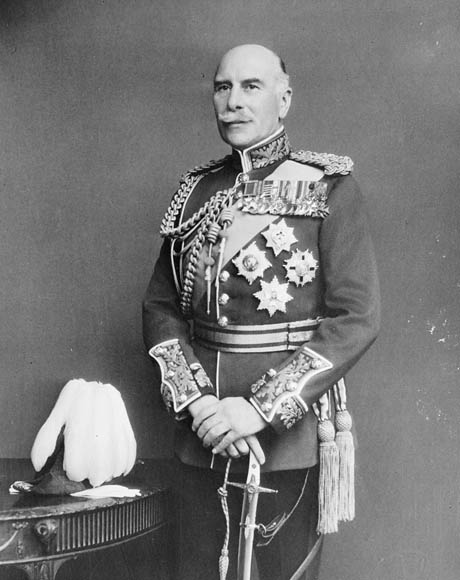
The Earl of Athlone, the last Governor General to use the viceregal office in the East Block

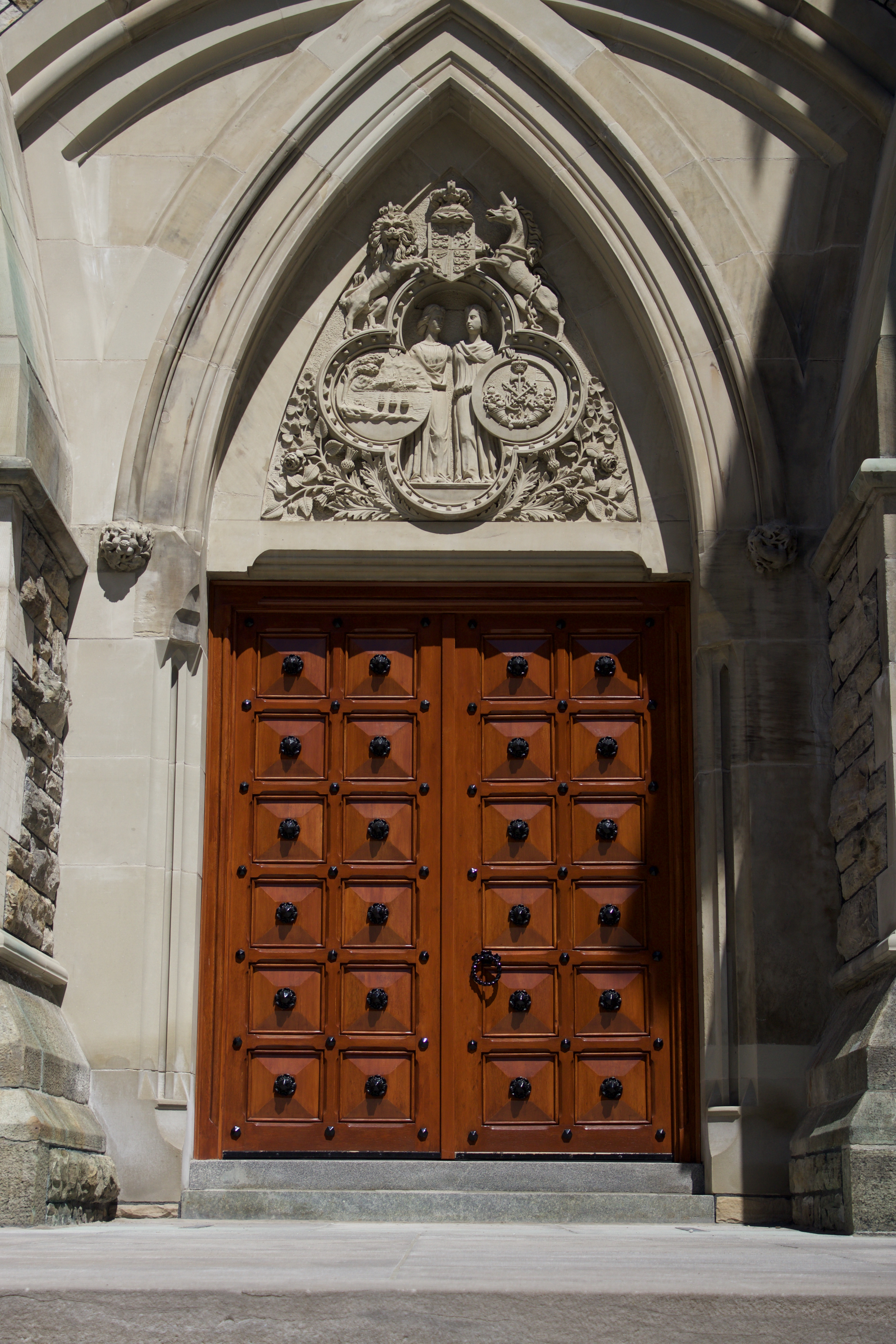
Entrance to the East Block in 2025

The Department of Public Works sent out on 7 May 1859 a call for architects to submit proposals for the new parliament buildings to be erected on Barrack Hill, which was answered by 298 submitted drawings. After the entries were narrowed down to three, then Governor General Sir Edmund Walker Head was approached to break the stalemate, and the winner was announced on 29 August. The departmental buildings, Centre Block, and a new residence for the governor general were each awarded separately, and the team of Thomas Stent and Augustus Laver, under the pseudonym of Stat nomen in umbra, won the prize for the first category.

Construction on the East Block commenced by the end of 1859, at the same time as work on the Centre Block and Stent and Laver's West Block began. By the time it was completed in 1866, the building was four years behind schedule and costs had risen to $706,549, when $150,000 had originally been allocated. As the home of the office of the governor general and the offices for all the Cabinet ministers, the East Block was immediately occupied by the Viscount Monck and his prime minister, John A. Macdonald, who occupied the room at the south west corner of the second floor; the same room was also used by Lester B. Pearson when he was Secretary for External Affairs. George-Étienne Cartier used an office at the northern end of the west wing, which was thereafter used by every prime minister until Pierre Trudeau. The King's Privy Council chamber was used for cabinet meetings for 105 years, and was where the British North America Act 1867 was formulated, decisions about the Red River Rebellions were made, and Canada's war involvement was orchestrated. As the number of staff on Parliament Hill grew with the expansion of the country, however, ever more office space was desired; in 1910 a new wing was added to the rear of the East Block, enclosing the courtyard, providing area for the Civil Service and vault space, and costing $359,121.

In the East Block's early days, the wives of ministers and senior staff attended tea in the building each Thursday afternoon, and other socializing took place outside of the working hours of 10am to 4pm. As well, governors general held their annual New Year's Levee in the building from 1870 until the Marquess of Willingdon moved the event to the Centre Block in 1928. Though the building contained many examples of the cutting edge technology of the time, such as a system of electric bells for communications, and state of the art sanitary, ventilation, and heating equipment, its spaces were continually chilly in winter and overheated in summer; during World War I, the external air intakes were closed off for fear of German spies entering them. Thereafter, the East Block showed more and more decay, which was further exacerbated by crude renovations and interventions during the Modernist period, and, at several points, the idea of demolishing the building in favour of a modern office block was put forward.

However, restoration of some interiors began in 1966, seeing Macdonald's office and the privy council chamber returned to an 1870 appearance, and after which the public was allowed entry for a few hours each weekend. Another spurt of renovations were completed in 1981, wherein the governor general's former office was restored, and then the mechanical and electrical systems, and the masonry of the 1910 wing, which had never previously been worked on, were renovated in 1997.

Plans for the restoration of the Parliamentary precinct originally called for the temporary relocation of the Senate chamber to the inner courtyard of the East Block. However, the revised plan saw the Senate chamber housed in the former Union Station, currently the Government Conference Centre, after renovations were completed to that building in 2018.

On 5 April 2025, a man was arrested for illegally entering the building and locking himself inside for hours, prompting a major security response.
