= Pacific-Union Club =

SF social club

Coordinates: 37°47′31.92″N 122°24′41.4″W

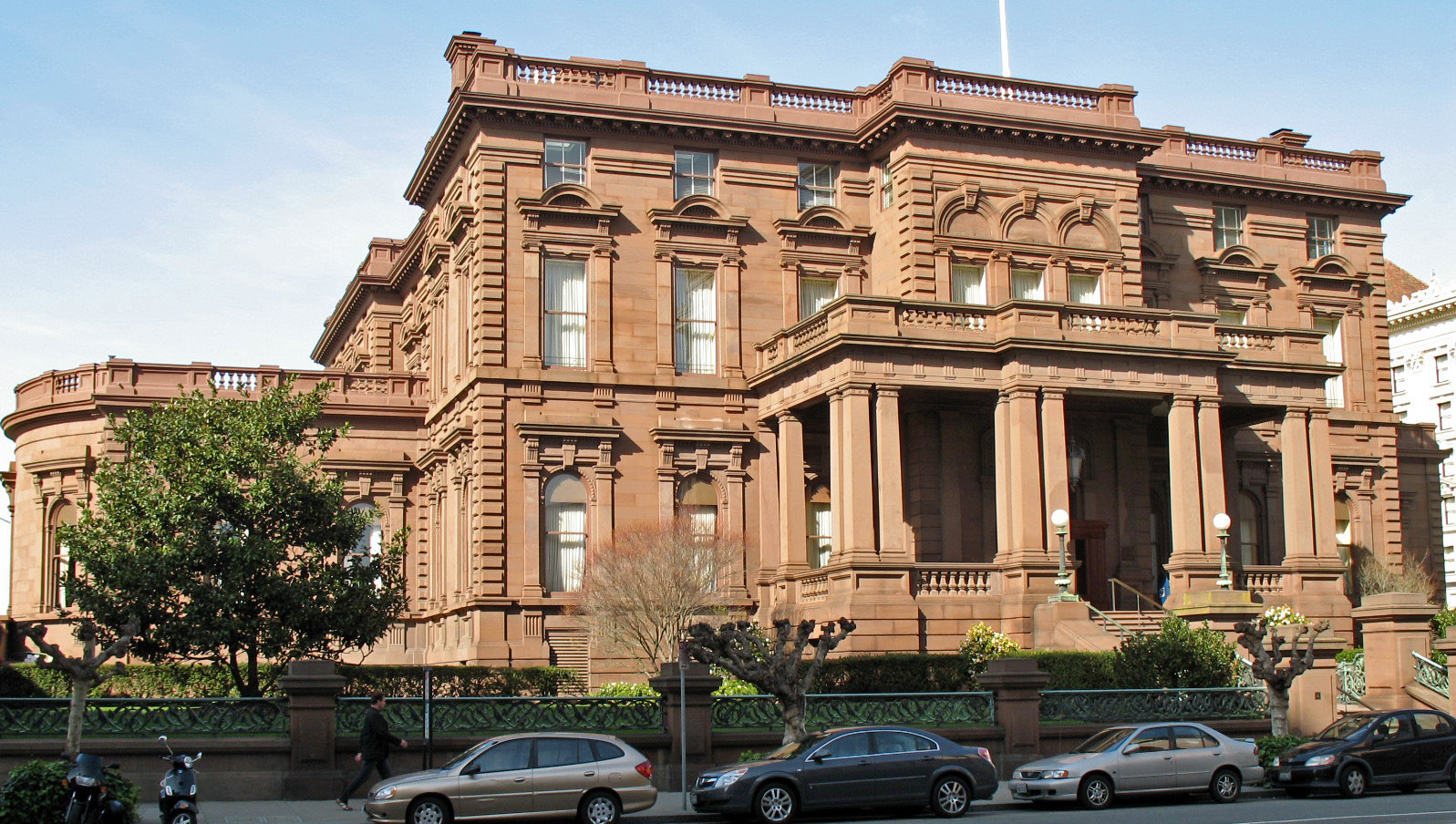
Pacific-Union Club

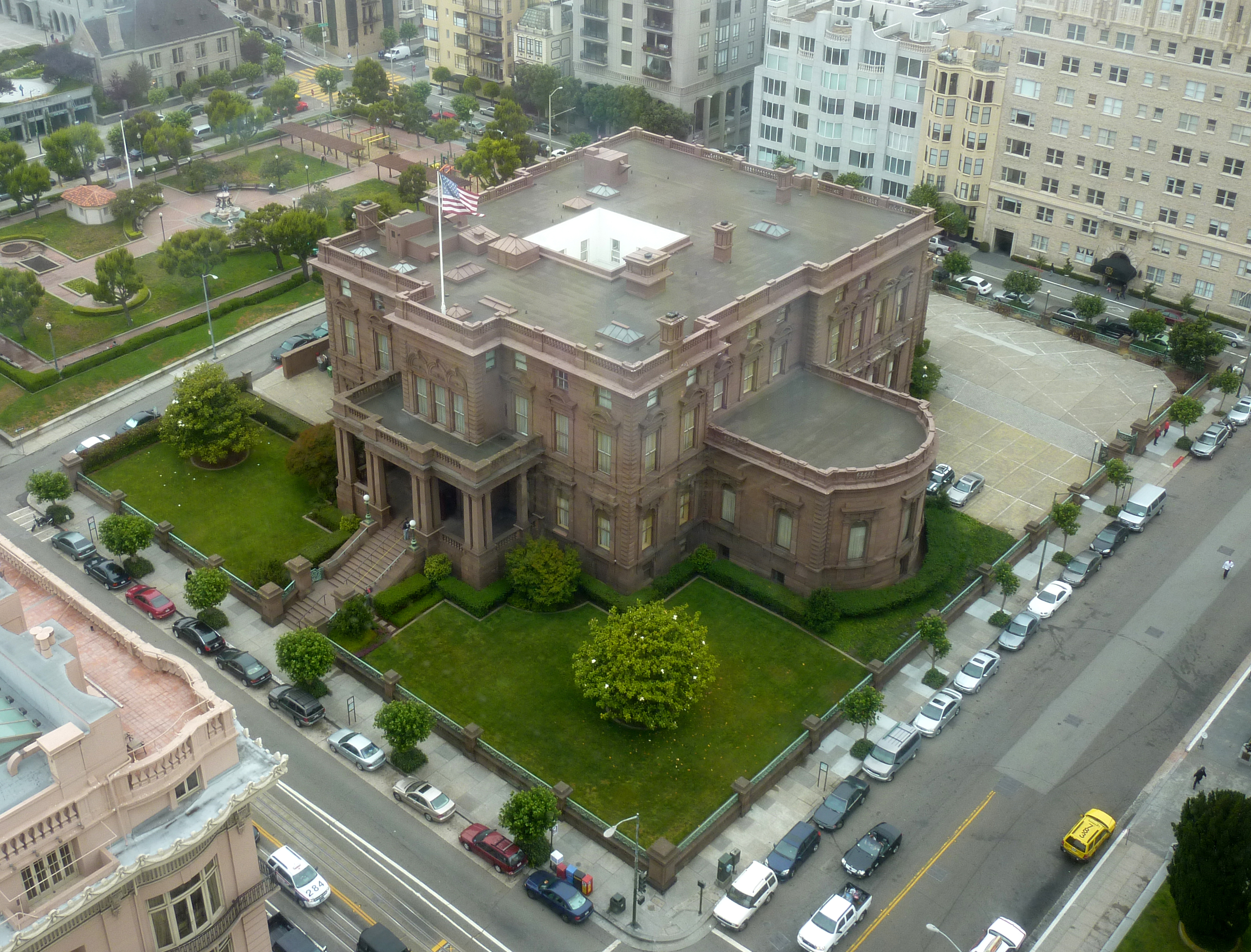
The James C. Flood Mansion is the home of the Pacific-Union Club

The Pacific-Union Club is a social club located at 1000 California Street in San Francisco, California, in the Nob Hill neighborhood. It was founded in 1889, as a merger of two earlier clubs: the Pacific Club (founded 1852) and the Union Club (founded 1854).

The clubhouse is the former Flood Mansion, built as a home for silver magnate James Clair Flood. It was designed by Canadian architect Augustus Laver. The reconstruction and expansion of the original mansion into the clubhouse was designed by Willis Polk. It is considered the first brownstone constructed west of the Mississippi River. Along with the Fairmont Hotel across the street, it was the only structure in the area to survive the San Francisco earthquake and fire of 1906.

== Prominent members ==
Some notable citizens have been Pacific-Union Club members, including:

- John Barneson (1862-1941), founder of General Petroleum Corporation, General Pipe Line Company
- Riley P. Bechtel (1952–), CEO, Bechtel Corporation
- Stephen Bechtel Jr. (1925–2021), former CEO, Bechtel Corporation
- Warren A. Bechtel (1872–1933), founder of Bechtel Corporation
- Benjamin Biaggini (1916–2005), former president and CEO, Southern Pacific Railroad
- William Lane Booker (1824–1905), British diplomat
- Benjamin Dillingham (1844–1918)
- William Henry Draper III (1928–), businessman
- Paul B. Fay Jr. (1918–2009), (deceased) former Undersecretary of the Navy and PT squadron mate of John F. Kennedy
- Tirey L. Ford (1857–1928), former California Attorney General
- Henry F. Grady (1882–1957), first US Ambassador to India; Dean of the Commerce Department at the University of California, Berkeley; President of American President Lines
- Walter A. Haas Jr. (1916–1995), CEO (1958–1976) and chairman (1970–1981) of Levi Strauss & Co
- Randolph Apperson Hearst (1915–2000)
- William Randolph Hearst Jr. (1908–1993)
- William Randolph Hearst III (1949–)
- William Redington Hewlett (1913–2001), co-founder of Hewlett-Packard
- Henry J. Kaiser (1882–1967), engineer and founder of Kaiser Family Foundation
- William S. Mailliard (1917–1992), former U.S. Representative (1953-1974)
- Robert McNamara (1916–2009), former U.S. Secretary of Defense
- David Packard (1912–1996), co-founder of Hewlett-Packard and former U.S. Deputy Secretary of Defense
- R. A. F. Penrose Jr. (1863–1931), prominent geologist
- Herman Phleger (1890–1984), founder of Brobeck Phleger and Harrison, former legal advisor of the U.S. Department of State
- Donald J. Russell (1900–1985), former president, Southern Pacific Railroad
- Charles R. Schwab (1937–), founder of Charles Schwab Corporation
- Plácido Vega y Daza (1830–1878), former General and Governor of the Mexican state Sinaloa. He descended directly from Christopher Columbus' great-great grandson, the Admiral and 3rd Duke of Veragua. General Vega y Daza also became a vice-president of the club.
- Caspar Weinberger (1917–2006), former U.S. Secretary of Defense

== Pacific Union Club Punch ==
Pacific Union Club Punch is a drink named after the Pacific-Union Club in William "Cocktail" Boothby's 1908 work The World's Drinks And How To Mix Them with the recipe:

For a party of ten. Into a large punch-bowl place ten tablespoonfuls of bar sugar and ten tablespoonfuls of freshly squeezed lime or lemon juice. Add two jiggers of Curaçao and dissolve the whole in about a quart of effervescent water. Add two quarts of champagne and one bottle of good cognac. Stir thoroughly, ice, decorate and serve in thin glassware.

== See also ==
- List of American gentlemen's clubs
