= Augustus Laver =

English architect (1834–1898)

- Born: 19 September 1834; Folkestone, Kent
- Died: 27 March 1898 (aged 63); Alameda, California
- Resting place: Mountain View Cemetery
- Spouse: Elizabeth Fox (m. 1859)

Augustus Laver (19 or 20 September 1834 – 27 March 1898) was an English architect. He worked for Thomas Stent and later designed extensive alterations and additions to Ottawa's Russell Hotel, as well as East Block and West Block on Parliament Hill.

== Biography ==
Laver was born in Folkestone, England. His father, George Laver, was a leading solicitor and his mother Mary Ann—; m. 9 June 1859 Elizabeth Fox in Dover, England, had twin sons and a daughter.

He entered the 1866 competition to design the New York State Capitol at Albany and was awarded one of the premiums, participated with Thomas Fuller, and Arthur Delavan Gilman in planning a revised design. In Albany he partnered with Fuller, but after controversy neither partner saw the project to completion.

In 1871 Thomas Stent and Laver won the competition to design the new city hall and law courts for San Francisco. Eight years after Laver's death, the unfinished building was destroyed in the fire following the 1906 earthquake.

Laver was the architect of San Francisco's first brownstone, the neo classical James C. Flood Mansion and, not far away, in Oakland, the grand Victorian, Ellen Kenna House.

He was involved with the Royal Institute of British Architects, was president of the Pacific Coast Association of Architects and a fellow of the American Institute of Architects. He died on 27 March 1898 in Alameda, California.

== Works ==
- New York State Capitol, 1866 design
- Russell House (Ottawa) renovations
- St Patrick's Basilica (Ottawa), (1869)
- James C. Flood Mansion (1886), unfinished, now home to the Pacific-Union Club
- Ellen Kenna House (1888) in Oakland, California
- San Francisco City Hall (1899), destroyed by fire after 1906 earthquake
