= Queen's Gates =

Formal entrance to Parliament Hill, Ontario

Coordinates: 45.424807°N 75.699234°W

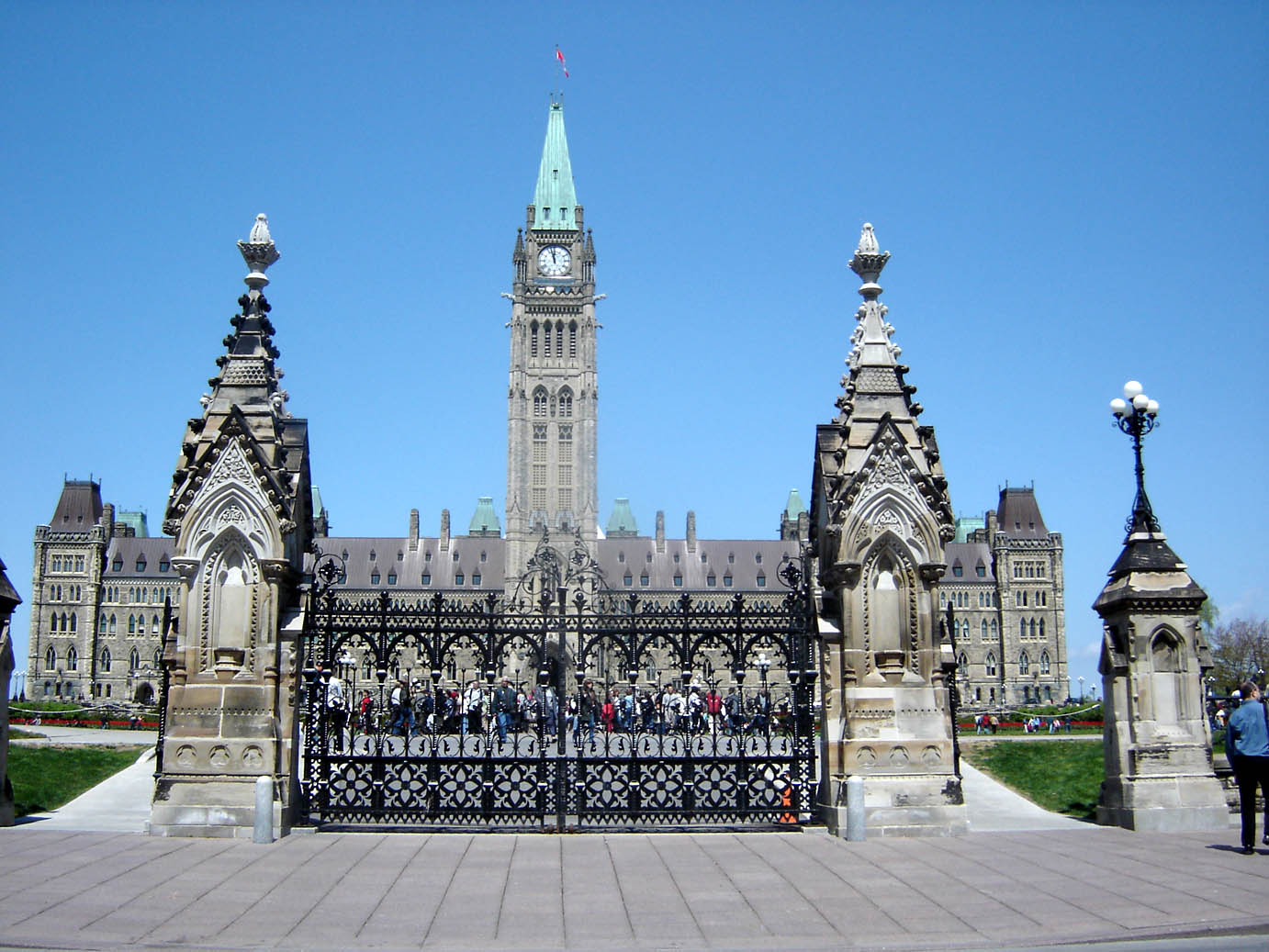
The main entrance of Parliament Hill, the Queen's Gates, erected in 1876

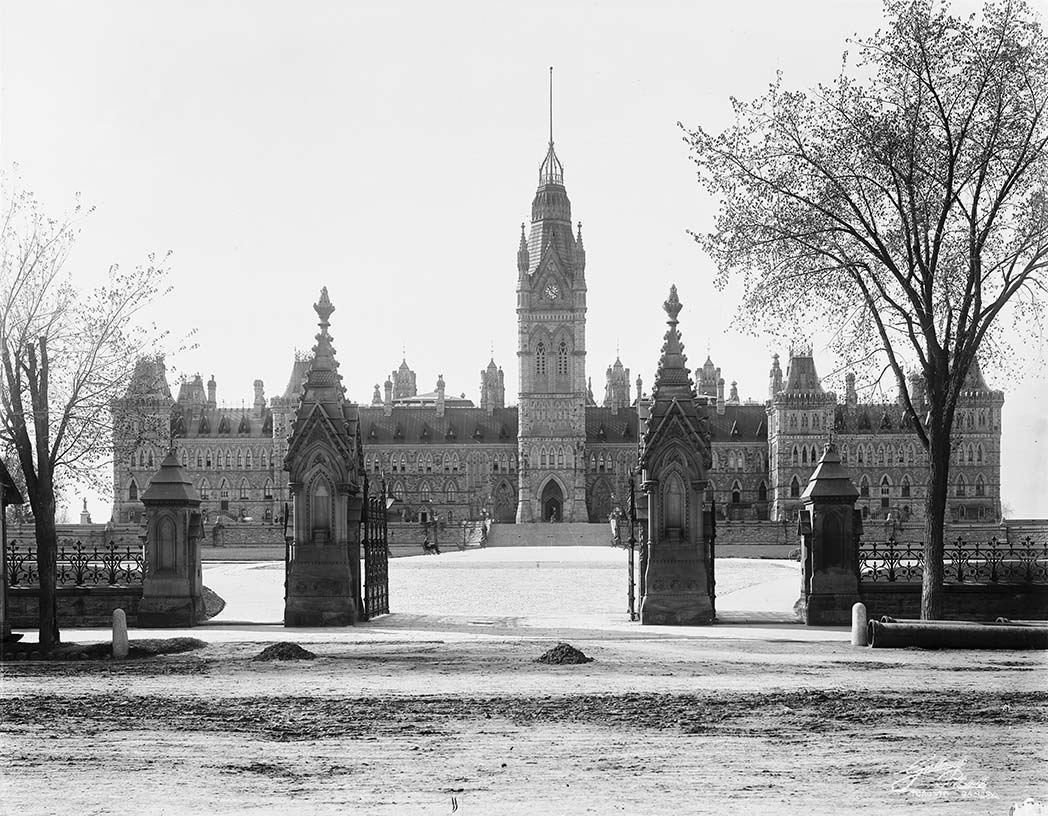
The Queen's Gates as they appeared in 1900

The Queen's Gates (French: Porte de la Reine) is the formal entrance to Parliament Hill, the location of the Canadian parliament buildings, in Ottawa, Ontario. Built in 1872 and set into the fence, known as the Wellington Wall, between piers designed in the Victorian High Gothic style that was fashionable in Canada at the time, the gates sit on the central axis of the hill's landscaping, in line with the Centennial Flame and Peace Tower beyond, and open onto Wellington Street.

By the early 1990s, neither the piers nor the ironwork had been properly renovated since their construction; salt from the street, the freeze-thaw cycle, and pollution had damaged and disintegrated the grout and stone faces. Thus, in 1992, Public Works and Government Services Canada began a $5 million restoration project of the entire fence along Wellington, which included the Queen's Gates. The piers were fully repointed and stabilised, including their foundations, and the gates were restored and partly rebuilt by a blacksmith.

== See also ==
- Royal eponyms in Canada
