= Parliament Hill =

Home of the Canadian Parliament in Ottawa

Parliament Hill; Colline du Parlement
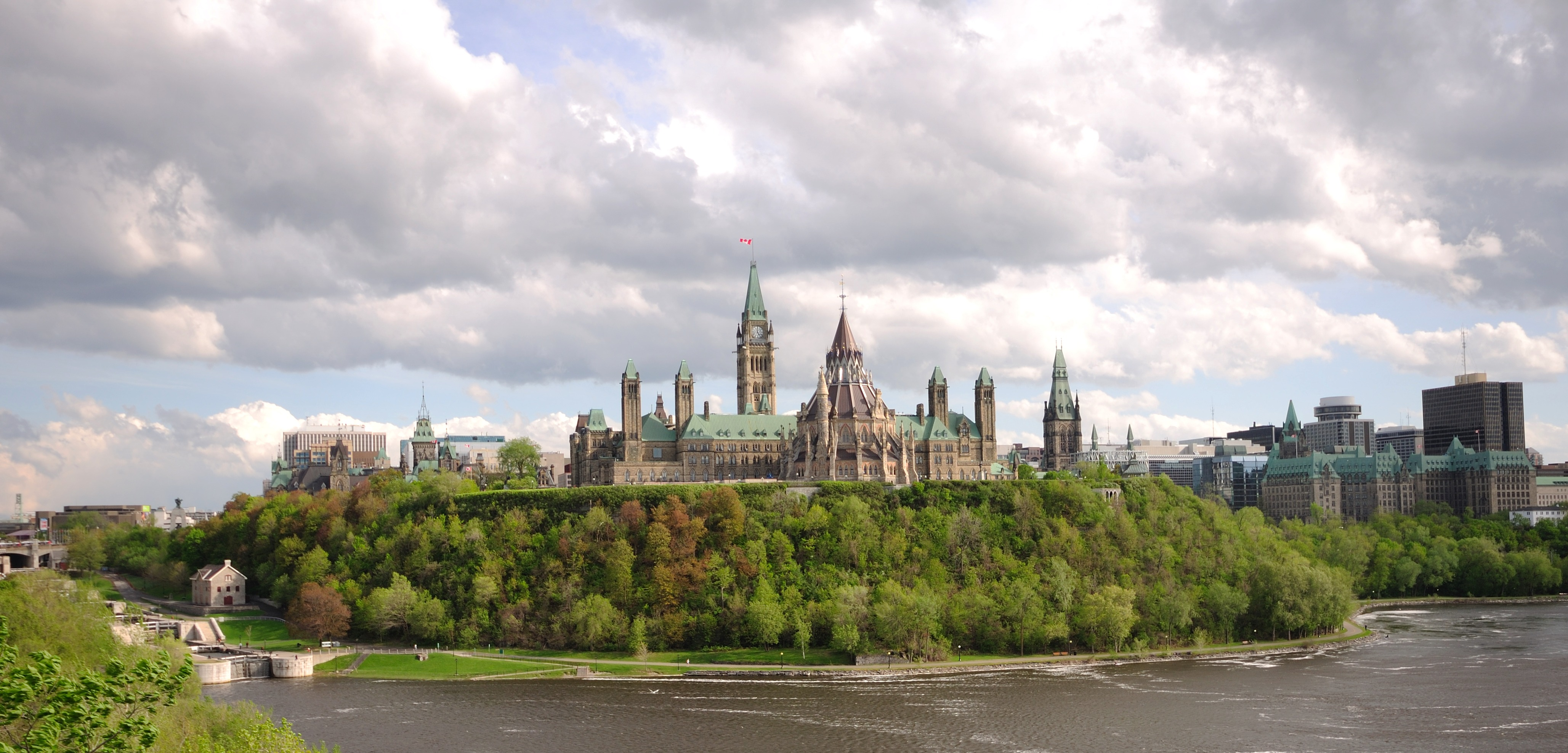
- Parliament Hill, 2009
- Interactive map of: Parliament Hill; Colline du Parlement
- 45°25′29″N 75°41′58″W
- Location: Ottawa River / Wellington Street, Downtown Ottawa

History
- Built: 1859–1876
- Built for: Legislature of the Province of Canada, Parliament of Canada

Site notes
- Architects: Calvert Vaux, Marshall Wood (landscapes); Thomas Scott (oversight)
- Governing body: National Capital Commission

National Historic Site of Canada
- Official name: Grounds of the Parliament Buildings National Historic Site of Canada
- Designated: 1976
- Visitors: 3 million annually

Parliament Hill (French: Colline du Parlement) is an area of Crown land on the southern bank of the Ottawa River that houses the Parliament of Canada in Ottawa, Ontario. It accommodates a suite of Gothic revival buildings whose architectural elements were chosen to evoke the history of parliamentary democracy. Parliament Hill attracts approximately three million visitors each year. The Parliamentary Protective Service is responsible for law enforcement on Parliament Hill and in the parliamentary precinct, while the National Capital Commission is responsible for maintaining the nine-hectare (22-acre) area of the grounds.

Development of the area, which in the 18th and early 19th centuries was the site of a military base, into a governmental precinct began in 1859 after Queen Victoria chose Ottawa as the capital of the Province of Canada. Following several extensions to the Parliament and departmental buildings, and a fire in 1916 that destroyed the Centre Block, Parliament Hill took on its present form with the completion of the Peace Tower in 1927. In 1976, the Parliament Buildings and the grounds of Parliament Hill were designated as National Historic Sites of Canada. Since 2002, an extensive $3 billion renovation-and-rehabilitation project has been underway throughout the precinct's buildings that is expected to be completed after 2028.

== History ==
=== Early use ===
Parliament Hill is a limestone outcrop with a gently sloping top that was originally covered in a primeval forest of beech and hemlock. For hundreds of years, the hill was a landmark on the Ottawa River for First Nations people and later for European traders, adventurers, and industrialists, marking their journeys to the interior of the continent. After the founding of Ottawa, which was then called Bytown, the builders of the Rideau Canal sited a military base on the hill, naming it Barrack Hill. A large fortress was planned for the site following the War of 1812 and the Upper Canada rebellion but the threat of an American invasion subsided and the project was scrapped.

=== Selection as a parliamentary precinct ===
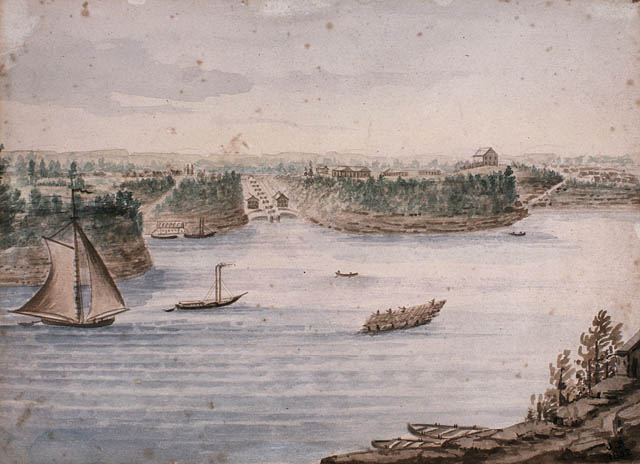
The Ottawa locks of the Rideau Canal, with Barrack Hill—present-day Parliament Hill—right of centre; 1832

In 1858, Queen Victoria selected Ottawa as the capital of the Province of Canada. Barrack Hill was chosen as the site of the new parliament buildings for its prominence over the town and the river, and because the Crown already owned it. On 7 May 1859, the Department of Public Works issued a call for design proposals for the new parliament buildings on Barrack Hill, for which 298 drawings were submitted. The number of entries was reduced to three but the panel of judges could not decide whose design should win the contest. Governor General Sir Edmund Walker Head was approached to break the stalemate, and the winners were announced on 29 August 1859.

Contracts to build the Centre Block and departmental buildings were separately awarded. The first was awarded to the team of Thomas Fuller and Chilion Jones, with their Victorian High Gothic scheme of a formal, symmetrical front facing a quadrangle and a more rustic, picturesque back facing the escarpment and bluffs overlooking the Ottawa River. The team of Thomas Stent and Augustus Laver won the prize for the second category, which included the subsequent East and West Blocks structures. These proposals were selected for their sophisticated use of Gothic architecture, which was thought to remind people of parliamentary democracy's old European history, and would contradict the republican neoclassical style of architecture used in Washington, D.C. It was also thought that it would be better suited to the rugged surroundings of still wilderness in northern North America, while being stately. $300,000 was allocated for the main building and $120,000 more for each of the several departmental buildings.

=== Construction and early use ===
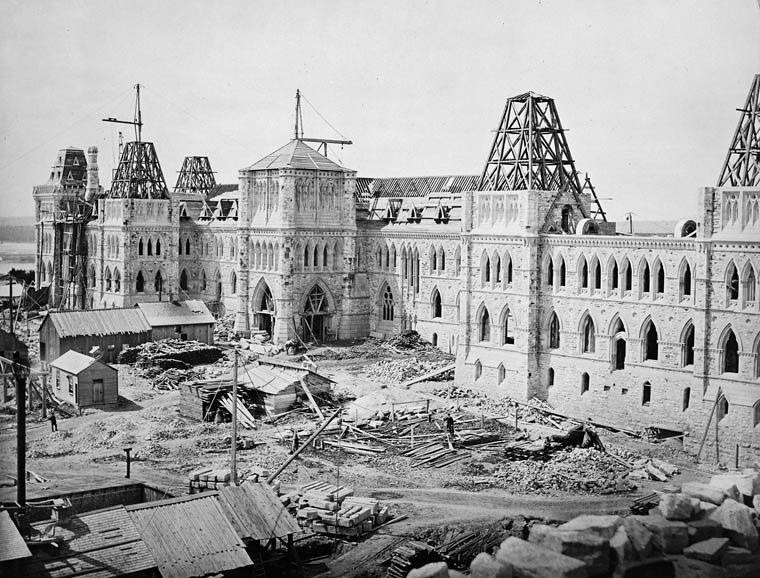
Centre Block under construction in 1863

Ground was broken on 20 December 1859 and the first stones were laid on 16 April the following year. Prince Albert Edward, Prince of Wales (later King Edward VII), laid the cornerstone of the Centre Block on 1 September. The stone is called Potsdam sandstone and it was quarried in Nepean, a distance of 30 km. Construction of Parliament Hill became the largest construction project undertaken in North America to that date. Workers hit bedrock sooner than expected, necessitating blasting to complete the foundations, which the architects had altered to sit 5.2 metres (17 ft) deeper than originally planned. By early 1861, the Canadian Department of Public Works reported over $1.4 million had been spent on the venture, leading to the closure of the site in September and the covering of the unfinished structures with tarpaulins until 1863, when construction resumed following a commission of inquiry.

The site was still incomplete when three of the British North American colonies—now the provinces Ontario, Quebec, Nova Scotia, and New Brunswick—entered Confederation in 1867, and Ottawa became the capital of the new country. Within four years, Manitoba, British Columbia, Prince Edward Island, and the North-West Territories—now Alberta, Saskatchewan, Yukon, Northwest Territories, and Nunavut—were added and, along with the associated bureaucracy, the first three required representation be added in Parliament. The offices of Parliament spread to buildings beyond Parliament Hill.

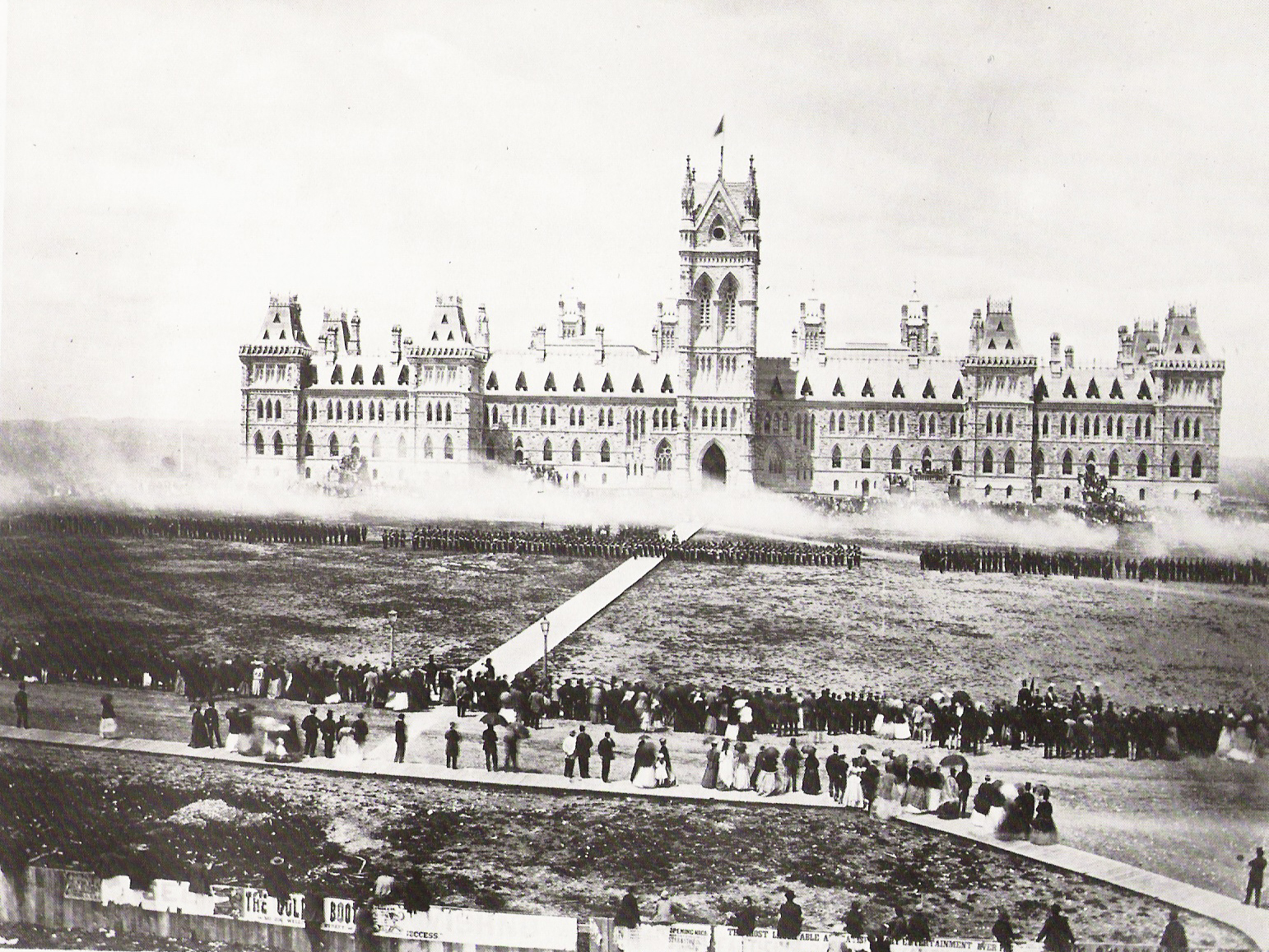
Troops deliver a feu de joie on Parliament Hill for the Queen's Birthday Review in 1868.

The British military allocated a nine-pounder naval cannon to Ottawa's British army garrison in 1854. The newly created government of the Dominion of Canada purchased the cannon in 1869 and fired it on Parliament Hill as the Noonday Gun, which was colloquially known as "Old Chum", for many years.

By 1876, the structures of Parliament Hill, and the surrounding fence and gates, were completed. The grounds were designed with the help of architects Thomas Scott and Calvert Vaux. Following the death of Queen Victoria in 1901, in late September that year, Prince George, Duke of Cornwall (later King George V)—Queen Victoria's grandson—dedicated a large statue that stands on the hill in the late Queen's honour.

=== Fire, incidents, and renovations ===
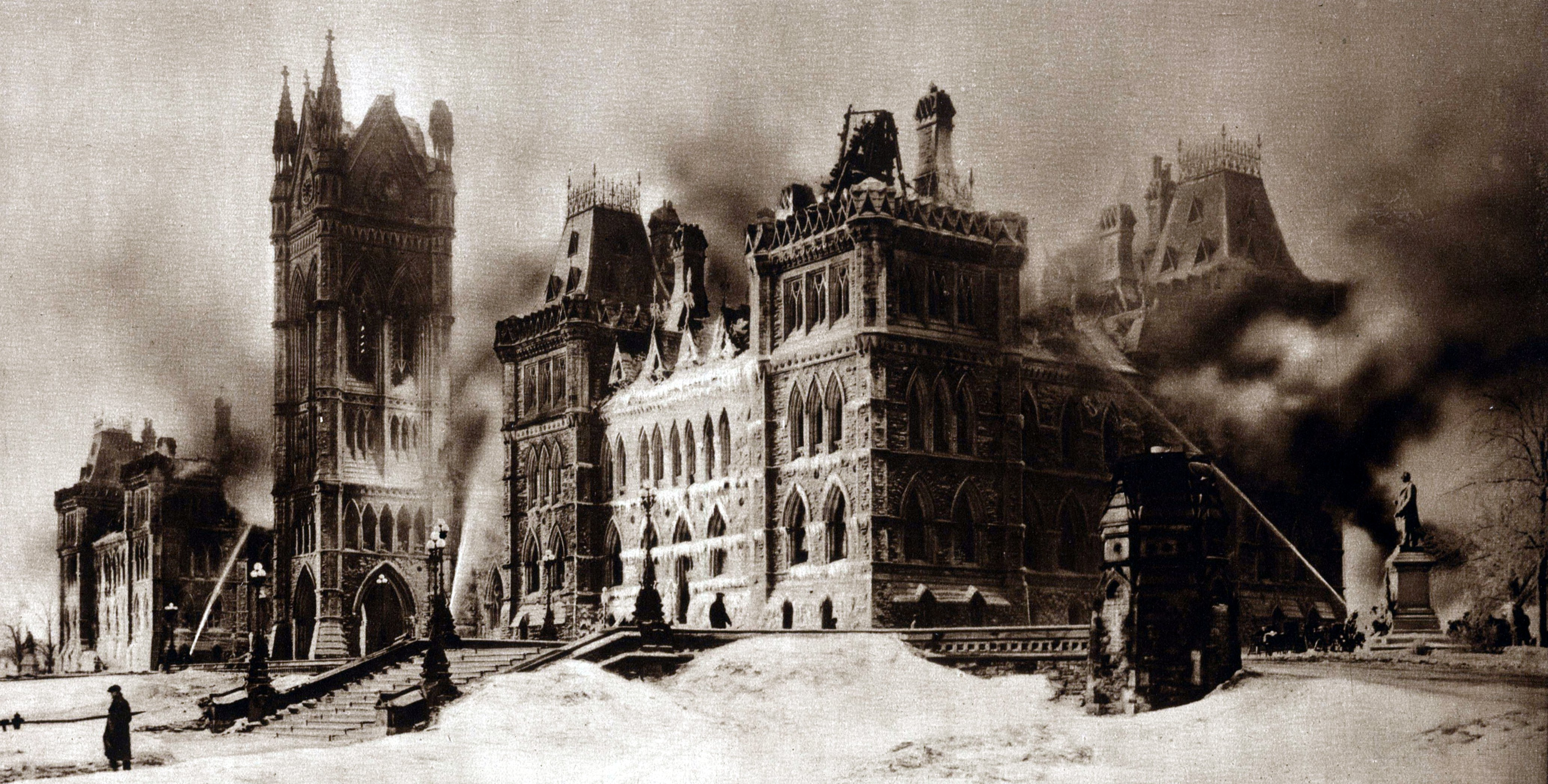
The parliament buildings the morning after the fire of 1916

On 3 February 1916, a fire destroyed the Centre Block. Despite the ongoing war, Governor General Prince Arthur, Duke of Connaught, re-laid the original cornerstone on 1 September 1916, exactly fifty-six years after his brother the future King Edward VII had first set it. Eleven years later, the rebuilt Centre Block was completed and a new, freestanding bell tower was dedicated as the Peace Tower in commemoration of the Canadians who had died during the First World War.

Parliament Hill has hosted several significant events in Canadian history, including the first visit of the reigning Canadian sovereign King George VI and his consort Queen Elizabeth to his Parliament in 1939. A huge celebration on 8 May 1945 marked Victory in Europe Day, and the first raising of the country's new national flag took place on 15 February 1965. Queen Elizabeth II revisited Parliament Hill on 17 April 1982 for the issuing of a royal proclamation of the enactment of the Constitution Act that year.

In April 1989, armed man Charles Yacoub hijacked a Greyhound Lines bus with eleven passengers on board that was travelling to New York City from Montreal, and drove it onto the lawn in front of the Centre Block. A six-hour standoff with police ensued; three shots were fired but there were no injuries.

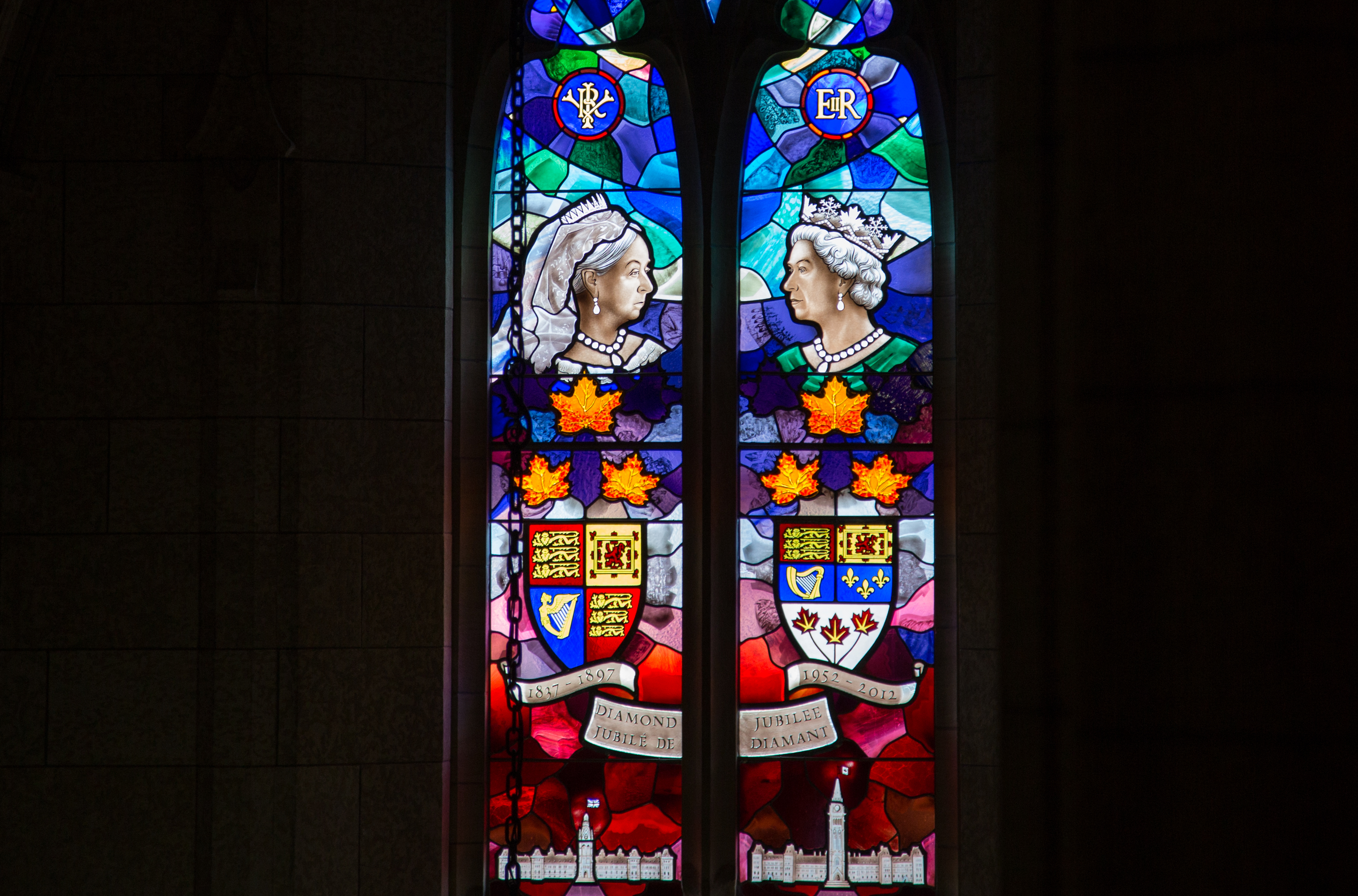
The special Diamond Jubilee window of Queen Elizabeth II alongside Queen Victoria's Diamond Jubilee window

On 14 September 2001, 100,000 people gathered on the main lawn to honour the victims of the September 11 attacks on the United States that year. Queen Elizabeth II's Diamond Jubilee was commemorated with the installation of a stained glass window in the Centre Block on 7 February 2012, one day after Accession Day.

On 22 October 2014, shooting incidents occurred around Parliament Hill. After fatally shooting a Canadian Army soldier stationed as a ceremonial guard at the National War Memorial, a gunman entered the Centre Block of the parliament buildings. There, the shooter engaged in a firefight with Sergeant-at-Arms of the House of Commons Kevin Vickers and members of the Royal Canadian Mounted Police (RCMP). The incident ended when the shooter was killed by Vickers and RCMP Constable Curtis Barrett. Following the incidents, the Parliamentary Protective Service was created to integrate the House of Commons and Senate security forces with RCMP patrols of the grounds.

Since 2002, an extensive $3 billion renovation-and-rehabilitation project has been underway throughout the precinct's buildings to bring the Parliament buildings to modern safety standards and to address their deteriorated state; work is not expected to be complete until after 2028. The West Block was completed in November 2018 before the House of Commons moved there and renovations on the Senate of Canada Building concluded in 2019 to accommodate the Senate while the Centre Block and East Block undergo renovations. Work on the Sir John A. Macdonald Building was completed in 2015 and work on the Wellington Building was completed in 2016. An architectural competition was held for designs pertaining to the city block south of Wellington Street between O'Connor and Metcalfe, with the winner being selected in 2022 and construction being underway as of 2025. A new Visitor Welcome Centre is being built alongside crucial modifications to the foundation of the Centre Block, including the installation of 500 base isolators to protect the structure from earthquakes.

== Grounds and name ==
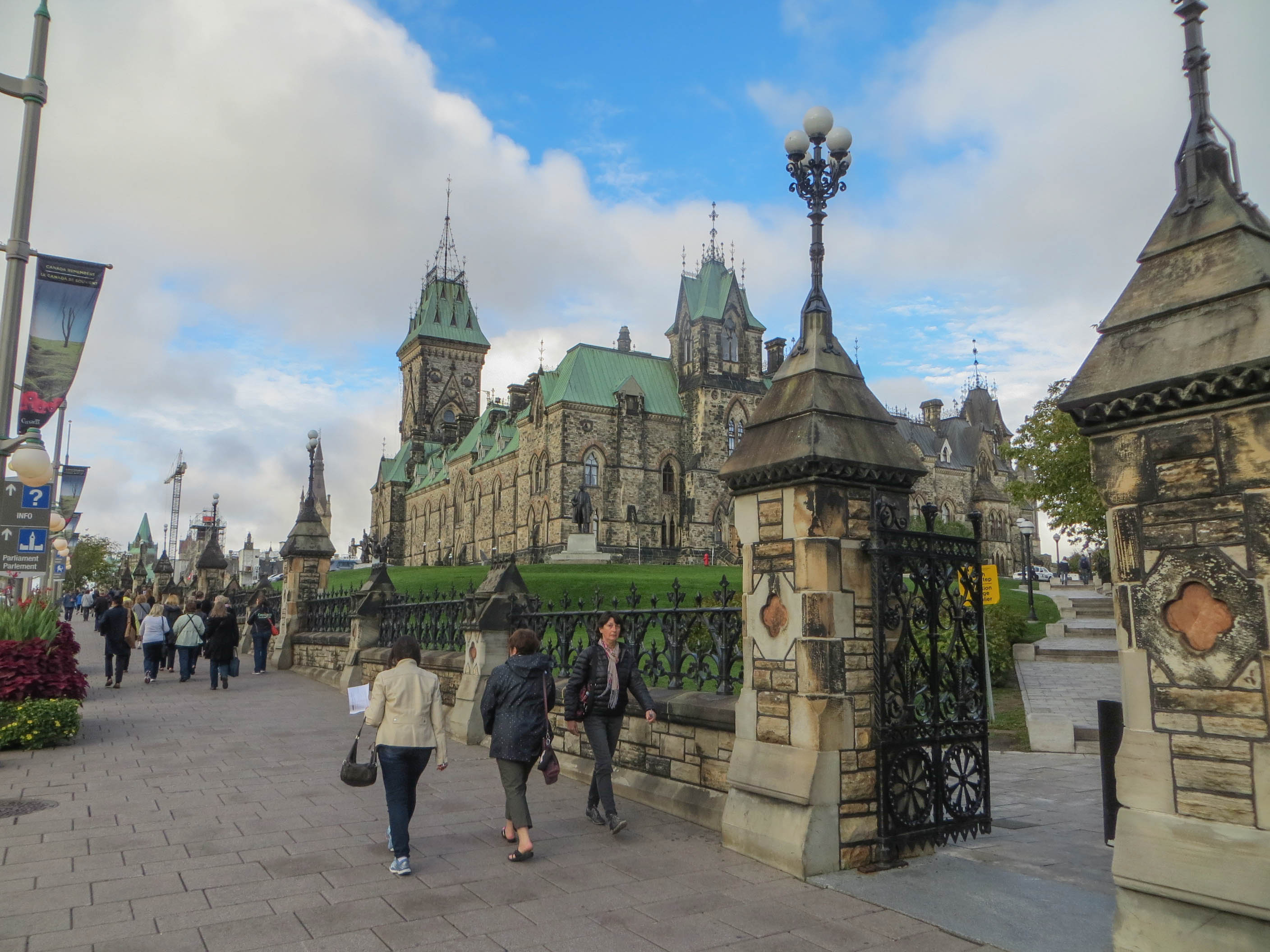
The southern front of the property is demarcated by a wrought iron fence. A portion of the Queen's Gates is pictured in the right foreground.

The nine-hectare (22-acre) area, which the National Capital Commission maintains, is named by the Parliament of Canada Act as "Parliament Hill" and is defined as resting between the Ottawa River to the north, the Rideau Canal and the Colonel By Valley to the east, Wellington Street to the south, and a service road called Kent Street near the Supreme Court to the west. A Victorian, high-gothic, wrought iron fence demarcates the south front of the property. The fence, which is named the Wellington Wall, has its centre on an axis with the Peace Tower to the north and the formal entrance to Parliament Hill the Queen's Gates, which Ives & Co. of Montreal forged. Approximately three million visitors come to the hill every year.

The hill's main outdoor area is the formal forecourt, which is formed by the arrangement of the Parliament and departmental buildings on the site. This expanse is the site of major celebrations, demonstrations, and traditional shows such as the annual Canada Day celebrations and the Changing of the Guard. To the sides of the buildings are statues, memorials, and at the northwest corner a gazebo called the Summer Pavilion, which is a 1995 reconstruction of an earlier gazebo named Summer House. Summer House was built for the Speaker of the House of Commons in 1877 by Thomas Seaton Scott and demolished in 1956. Summer Pavilion now serves as the National Police Memorial. Beyond the edges of these landscaped areas, the escarpment remains in its natural state. At its base runs part of the Trans-Canada Trail, the portion between the West Block and the Supreme Court building being named the Queen Elizabeth II Diamond Jubilee Trail, in commemoration of the 60th anniversary of Elizabeth's accession to the Canadian throne.

In 1976, the Parliament Buildings and the grounds of Parliament Hill were each designated as National Historic Sites of Canada due to their importance as the physical embodiment of the Canadian government and as the focal point of national celebrations.

The Parliament of Canada Act prohibits anyone naming any other area or establishment within the National Capital Region "Parliament Hill", and forbids the production of merchandise bearing that name. Any violation of this law is punishable on summary conviction.

Map showing the buildings on Parliament Hill and its surroundings. Click on the buildings to read their respective articles.

=== Parliament Buildings ===
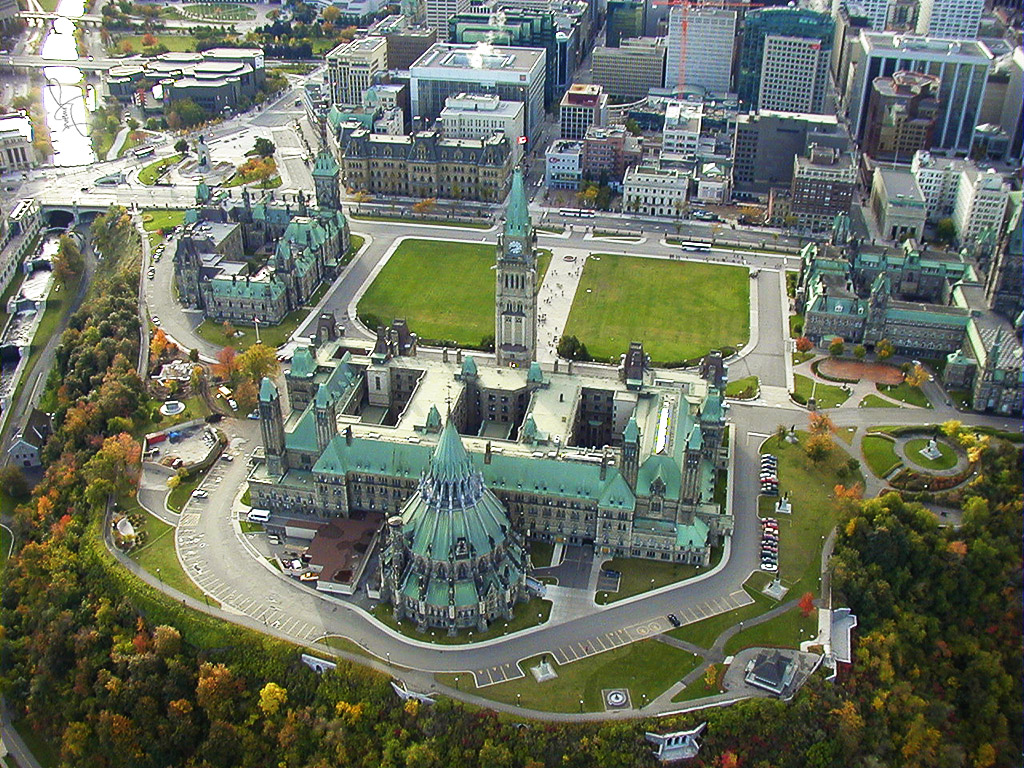
Aerial view of Canadian Parliament Buildings and its surroundings

The Parliament Buildings are three edifices arranged around three sides of Parliament Hill's central lawn. The speakers of each chamber of the legislature oversee the use and administration of the spaces within each building.

The Centre Block normally houses the Senate and Commons chambers (which have been temporarily relocated during renovations expected to conclude in 2028) and is fronted by the Peace Tower on the south facade, and the Library of Parliament lies at the building's rear.

The East Block contains ministers' and senators' offices, meeting rooms, and other administrative spaces.

The West Block is serving as the temporary seat of the House of Commons, its courtyard having been converted into the parliamentary chamber with a glass roof covering the formerly open space. Additionally, the building houses offices and meeting spaces for members of the House of Commons.

The buildings' unifying architectural style is Gothic Revival.

=== Monuments and statues ===
More than 20 bronze statues in the grounds commemorate important figures in Canada's history. Most are arranged in the gardens behind the three parliamentary buildings and one stands outside the main fence. (Note: Due to renovations on Parliament Hill, some statues have been relocated to other places around the hill.)

| Figure | Portrait | Statue | Notes |
|---|---|---|---|
| George-Étienne Cartier | | | This was the first statue erected on Parliament Hill and stands immediately west of the Centre Block. It was installed at the instigation of Sir John A. Macdonald. From among proposals from Canada, the United States, the United Kingdom, and Italy, Louis-Philippe Hébert was chosen to sculpt the monument, which was set up in the 1880s. |
| John A. Macdonald | | | Hébert was selected from 44 submissions from Canada, the United States, the United Kingdom, and Europe, to sculpt the statue of Canada's first prime minister. It was unveiled on the hill on 1 July 1895. |
| Queen Victoria | | | This statue is located at the northwest corner between the West and Centre Blocks. Hébert sculpted the statue of the country's first monarch that was first displayed at the 1900 Paris Exposition before being moved to Ottawa, and dedicated by Prince George, Duke of Cornwall and York, in 1901. |
| Alexander Mackenzie | | | Hébert was commissioned to sculpt this figure, which stands directly to the north of the statue of Cartier, at the same time as he was awarded the project of the monument to Queen Victoria. The statue was unveiled in 1901. |
| Sir Galahad | | | This is the only statue on Parliament Hill that is not of a monarch or politician, or within the site's fences. It was installed in 1905 on the initiative of the future prime minister William Lyon Mackenzie King to honour the bravery of his friend Henry Albert Harper, who drowned trying to rescue a girl who fell through thin ice in the Ottawa River in 1901. The statue was created by Ernest Wise Keyser. |
| George Brown | | | The competition for these sculptures took place simultaneously and George William Hill won both. The statues were installed in 1913. |
| D'Arcy McGee | | | The competition for these sculptures took place simultaneously and George William Hill won both. The statues were installed in 1913. |
| Robert Baldwin and Louis-Hippolyte Lafontaine | | | This dual statue by Walter Seymour Allward has occupied the site at the northeast corner of the parliamentary precinct since 1914. |
| Wilfrid Laurier | | | This work by Joseph-Émile Brunet was selected from 40 entries received from around the world. It was placed at the southeast corner of the site in 1922. |
| Robert Borden | | | Frances Loring cast this likeness for the 1957 session of Parliament Queen Elizabeth II opened; it stands at the southwest corner of Parliament Hill. |
| William Lyon Mackenzie King | | | Raoul Hunter designed this statue, which was commissioned for the Canadian Centennial in 1967 and stands at the northwest corner of the East Block. |
| John Diefenbaker | | | In 1985, Parliament voted unanimously in favour of a motion that would commemorate John Diefenbaker with a statue. Leo Mol was chosen from 21 submissions to sculpt this 1985 work, which stands immediately north of the West Block. |
| Lester B. Pearson | | | Danek Mozdzenski completed this monument in 1989; it lies immediately north of the West Block. |
| Queen Elizabeth II | | | Jack Harman sculpted this monument, which was unveiled in 1992 in the presence of the Queen, as part of the 125th anniversary of Confederation celebrations. It is situated in the opposite corner of the site from the statue of her great-great-grandmother. Due to construction work on Parliament Hill, the statue was moved to a roundabout on Sussex Drive. |
| The Famous Five | | | This monument, which is titled Women are Persons!, was donated in 2000 to the Crown by the Famous 5 Foundation. The monument is a collection of five statues by Barbara Paterson of each of The Famous Five—Emily Murphy, Irene Parlby, Nellie McClung, Louise McKinney, and Henrietta Edwards—as well as one empty chair. Due to construction on Parliament Hill, the statue was moved to Plaza Bridge near the Senate of Canada building. |

A number of other monuments are distributed across the hill, marking historical moments or acting as memorials for larger groups of people.

| Monument | Image | Notes |
|---|---|---|
| Centennial Flame | | Lester B. Pearson dedicated this fountain and flame on 1 January 1967 to mark the beginning of the Canadian Centennial. |
| Canadian Police and Peace Officers' Memorial | | This memorial includes a recreation of the former Summer Pavilion and honours Canadian police officers who were killed in the line of duty since 1879. It was dedicated on 22 March 1994 and has since been expanded to include the names of fallen officers from all law enforcement agencies, including the Ministry of Natural Resources, the Ministry of Fisheries and Oceans, and the Ministry of Conservation. The first names to be memorialised were inscribed on three granite slabs, and following names are inscribed on glass panels around the perimeter wall. |
| Victoria Tower Bell | | The bell in this monument, which was unveiled in 2000, is the bell is the original from the Victoria Tower, and is canted to recall the way in which it was found after it fell from its perch in the fire of 1916. |
| War of 1812 Monument | | Seven figures—a First Nations individual, a Métis militiaman, a British infantryman, a Quebec Voltigeur, a woman bandaging one of them, a Royal Navy marine, and a farmer—represent the War of 1812. Also part of the monument is a maple tree planted in soil taken from 10 Canadian battlefield sites and watered at the dedication with water from six oceans and lakes that were significant in the War of 1812. It was dedicated on 6 November 2014, the 200th anniversary of the Battle of Malcolm's Mills, the war's final battle in Canada. |
| Queen Elizabeth II Diamond Jubilee Trail | | A portion of the Trans-Canada Trail running along the Ottawa River named to mark the Diamond Jubilee of Queen Elizabeth II |

=== Surrounding area ===
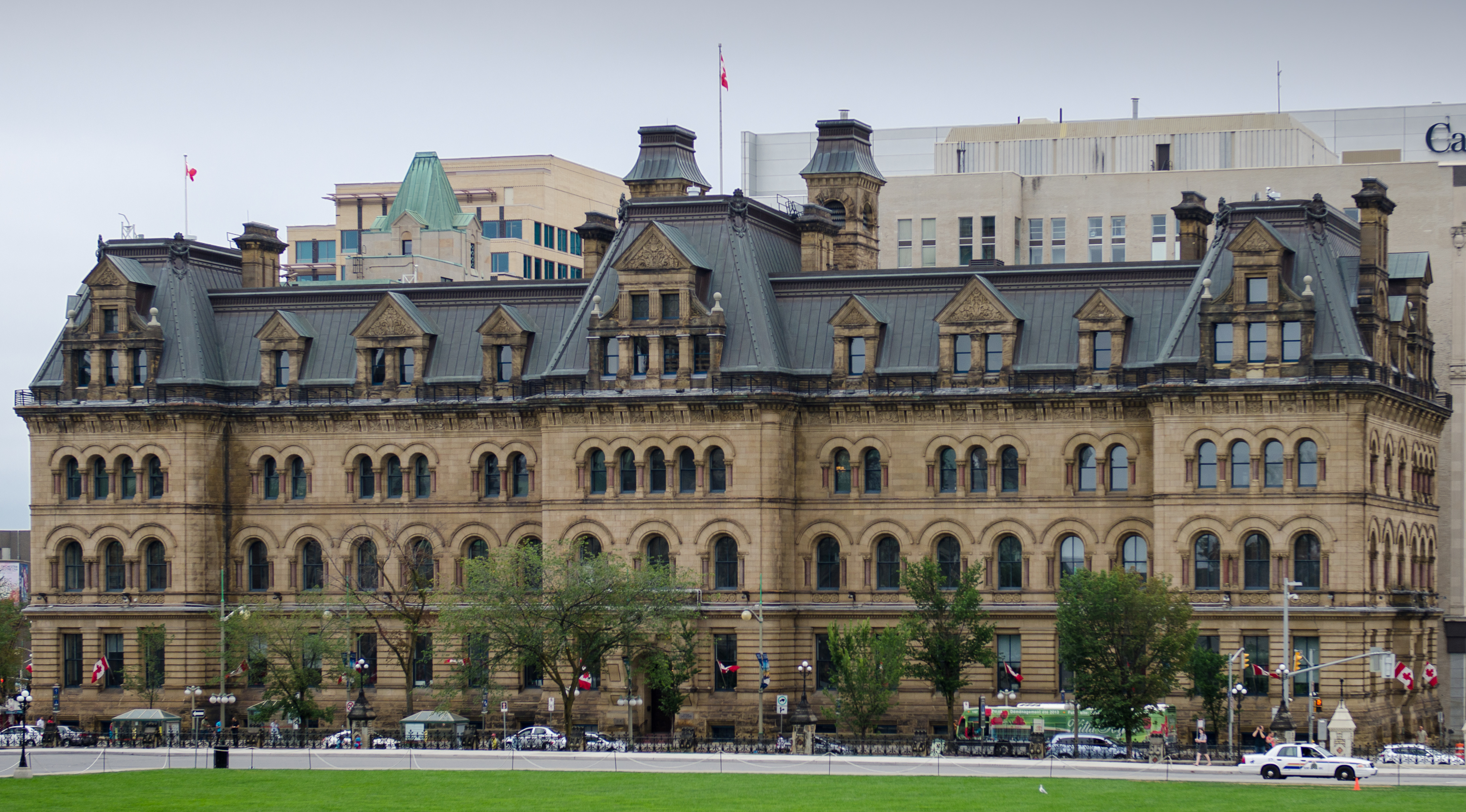
The Office of the Prime Minister and Privy Council Building is one of several federal properties situated next to Parliament Hill

Though Parliament Hill remains the heart of the parliamentary precinct, expansion beyond the bounded area began in the 1880s with the construction of the Langevin Block across Wellington Street. After private interests purchased land to the east across the canal to build the Château Laurier hotel, growth of the parliamentary infrastructure moved westward along Wellington Street with the erection in the 1930s of the Confederation and Justice Buildings on the north side, and further construction to the south. By the 1970s, the Crown began purchasing other structures or leasing space in downtown Ottawa. In 1973, the Crown expropriated the entirety of the three blocks between Wellington and Sparks Streets from Bank Street to Elgin Street, intending to construct a south block for Parliament Hill, but the government dropped this proposal and instead constructed more office space in Hull, Quebec. In 2021, this idea was revisited, and the Ministry of Public Services announced an architectural design competition for the block.

== See also ==
- Capitol Hill
- Government Hill
- Parliament Building (Quebec)
- Parliament Hill cat colony
- Parliament Hill, London
- Parliament station
- Parliamentary Triangle, Canberra
