= Yeovil Town House =

Municipal building in Yeovil, Somerset, England

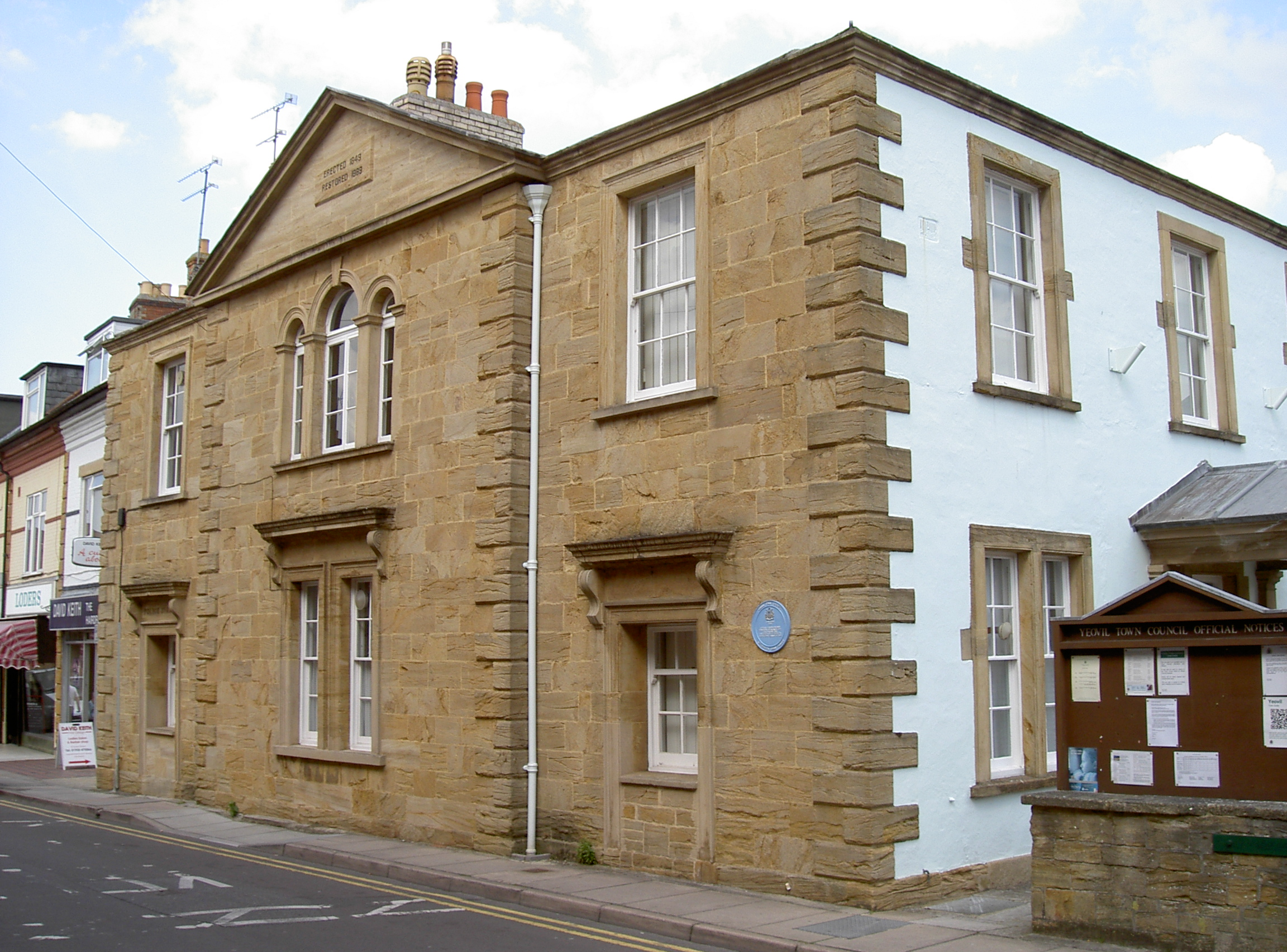
- Yeovil Town House

- Shown in Somerset
- 50.9406°N 2.6313°W
- Location: Union Street, Yeovil

History
- Built: 1849

Site notes
- Architect: Thomas Stent
- Architectural style: Neoclassical style

Listed Building – Grade II
- Official name: The Old Police Station
- Designated: 17 October 1983
- Reference no.: 1173857

The Town House is a municipal building in Union Street in Yeovil, Somerset, England. The building, which is the meeting place of Yeovil Town Council, is a Grade II listed building.

== History ==
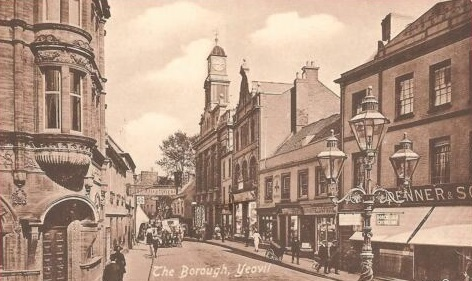
The Town Hall (with the clock tower) c.1913

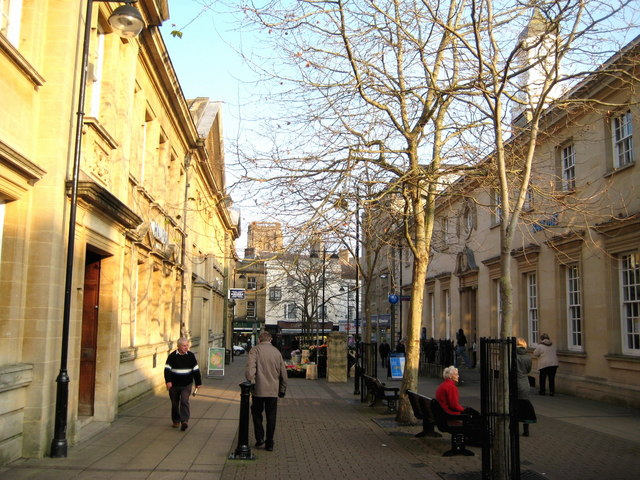
The Municipal Offices (on the right)

The first municipal building in Yeovil was the "Tolle Hall" in The Borough, which was used as a courthouse and a lock up for petty criminals and dated back at least to the early 17th century.

By the early 19th century, the Tolle Hall had become dilapidated, and the town commissioners decided to commission a new building to be known as the "Town Hall": the site they selected in the High Street had been occupied by local businesses including an ironmonger and a sadler. The new building was designed by Thomas Stent in the neoclassical style, built by John Rawlings at a cost of £4,000 and was completed in 1849. The design involved a symmetrical main frontage with five bays facing onto High Street; it was rusticated and arcaded on the ground floor, with five tall sash windows with architraves and window sills flanked by brackets supporting cornices on the first floor. The windows were separated by large Ionic order columns supporting a frieze, an entablature and a cornice. A local glove manufacturer, Thomas Dampier, donated a two-stage clock tower, with a belfry in the first stage, and clock faces in the second stage all surmounted by a dome and a weather vane, to commemorate the Coronation of George V and Mary in June 1911. The building was destroyed by a major fire on 22 September 1935. Works of art lost in the fire included a painting of King William IV and a painting depicting troops in Yeovil Churchyard prior to the Battle of Babylon Hill in September 1642 during the English Civil War.

The next building, the "Municipal Offices" in King George Street, was a structure which was originally commissioned to provide additional office space for Yeovil Borough Council. The structure was designed by a local firm of architects, Petter and Warren, in the Neo-Georgian style, built in ashlar stone and was officially opened by the mayor, Sidney Charles Clothier, on 7 June 1928. The design involved a symmetrical main frontage with nine bays facing onto King George Street; the central bay featured a doorway on the ground floor with an oculus on the first floor, while the other bays were fenestrated with sash windows on both floors. At roof level there was a wooden belfry with a dome. After the fire in the Town Hall, the Municipal Offices became the headquarters of the borough council in 1935, but ceased to be the local seat of government when the enlarged Yeovil District Council was formed at council offices in Preston Road in 1974. The building became a branch of Barclays in 1965.

The current municipal building in Union Street was commissioned by the town commissioners as offices for the town surveyor and for the local police force and was always known as the "Town House". The site they selected was part of the garden of a private house. The building was designed in the neoclassical style, built in local stone with hamstone dressings and was completed in 1849.

The design involved a symmetrical main frontage with three bays facing onto Union Street; the central bay, which slightly projected forward and was pedimented, featured a pair of tall sash windows with architraves and window sills flanked by brackets supporting a cornice on the ground floor. There was a tall round headed window flanked by two slightly shorter round headed windows, all with architraves, on the first floor. The outer bays contained doorways flanked by brackets supporting cornices on the ground floor and sash windows with architraves and window sills on the first floor.

The building was transferred to the management of the county constabulary in 1857 and remained in use as a police station until the police service moved to the new law courts in Petters Way in 1936. It then served as the local headquarters of the Royal Air Force Association in the 1950s. The newly formed Yeovil Town Council acquired the building in 1984 and a major programme of improvement works, which involved a pedimented Doric order porch and a stucco finish for the southern elevation, was completed in 1989.
