= Centennial Flame =

Monument in Ottawa, Canada

Coordinates: 45.42367°N 75.69882°W

- Flamme du centenaire
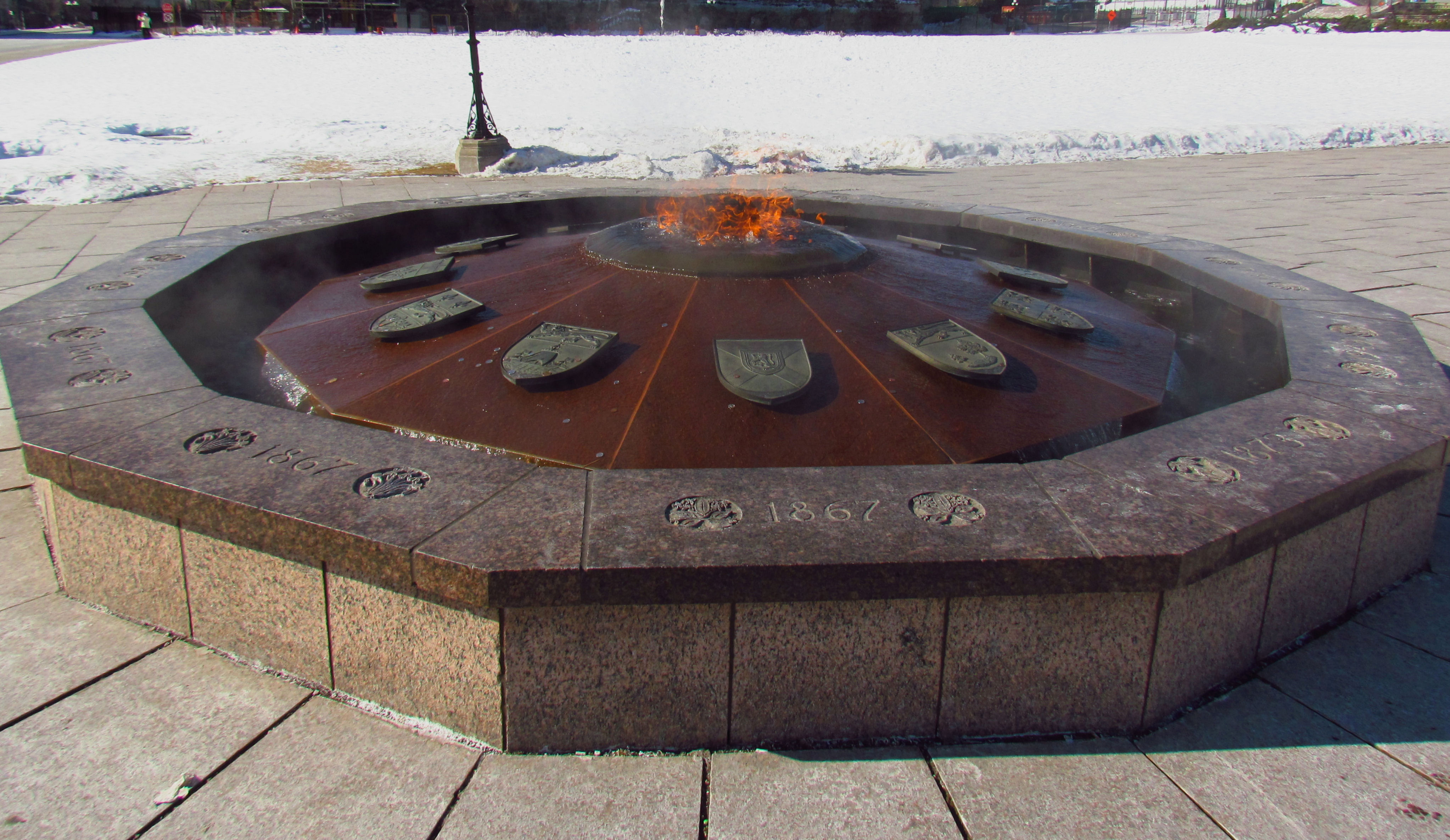
- Centennial Flame on Parliament Hill
- Map of the Centennial Flame on Parliament Hill
- Location: Ottawa, Ontario, Canada
- Type: Fountain
- Opening date: 1 January 1967; 59 years ago
- Dedicated to: 100th anniversary of the Canadian Confederation

The Centennial Flame (French: Flamme du centenaire) is a monument on Parliament Hill commemorating the 100th anniversary of the Canadian Confederation. First lit in January 1967, the Flame worked with natural gas and, as of 2021, uses biogas. This ensures the fountain does not freeze in winter. Money thrown into it is a donation for people with disabilities, some of whom have received over $5,000.

== History ==
The Centennial Flame was first lit as the climax of the centennial celebrations of 1 January 1967 for the Canadian Confederation, in the presence of Prime Minister Lester B. Pearson. He was joined on the hill by John Diefenbaker (leader of the Opposition and former prime minister) and Secretary of State Judy LaMarsh, as well as thousands of onlookers. The flame is fuelled by natural gas and surrounded by a fountain whose ledge contains the shields of the 13 provinces and territories—Nunavut was originally absent as it was not created until 1999. On 13 December 2017, a Nunavut plaque was unveiled.

This Flame was erected as a temporary monument, but due to great public support was made permanent. It is near the Queen's Gates and in front of the stairs leading to the Peace Tower and Centre Block. The Centennial was celebrated across Canada in various ways, including a re-enactment of the Battle of the Thames and a building of a destroyer out of match sticks. The government also encouraged the building of a Centennial memorial in each of the 10 provinces. The provincial and federal governments matched whatever the municipal government spent on their memorial, thereby encouraging the construction of grand buildings such as the National Arts Centre in Ottawa.

In 2021, the flame began burning carbon-neutral biogas.

== Design ==
The monument is encompassed by a fountain into which many visitors to Parliament Hill throw coins for luck. That change is gathered, washed, dried and sorted by maintenance before it is put into a government bank account. From there the money is given to the winner of the Centennial Flame Research Award. The award, which was begun in 2005, is given "to a person with a disability to enable him or her to conduct research and prepare a report on the contributions of one or more Canadians with disabilities to the public life of Canada or the activities of Parliament." The 2011 recipient, Andrew Morrison-Gurza, received $5,500. The 2012 recipient, Andrew St. Kitts, was a Masters student with cerebral palsy who planned on using the $5,000 he received to research "attitudes of able-bodied Canadians when they see people like him."

Because of the fire that burns above the water, the fountain does not freeze, even in the middle of the winter.

The flame is often confused for an eternal flame; however, it does not burn eternally. It may sometimes be extinguished due to bad weather or for maintenance purposes. In 2002, for example, during the G8 protest, Prime Minister Jean Chrétien decided to have the flame extinguished and the monument covered to avoid damage. It was covered by a welded steel lid attached to concrete.

== Sources ==
- Berton, Pierre (1997). 1967, the Last Good Year. Toronto: Doubleday Canada. ISBN 9780385256629.
- Francis, R. Douglas; Jones, Richard; Smith, Donald B. (2008). Origins: Canadian History to Confederation (6th ed.). Toronto: Nelson Education. ISBN 9780176442439.
- Public Works and Government Services Canada – Centennial Flame
