= John Barneson =

American businessman (1862–1941)

Captain John Barneson
- John Barneson
- Born: January 1, 1862; Wick, Scotland
- Died: February 26, 1941 (aged 79); San Mateo, California
- Occupation: Capitalist
- Spouse: Harriet Emily Harris (born 1866, died 1936) Married 1886
- Children: John Leslie Barneson, Muriel E. Barneson, Lionel T. Barneson, Harold James Barneson

Captain John Barneson (1862-1941) was one of the most important figures in commerce and development on the Pacific Coast of California. He was responsible for the first oil pipeline in the State of California and was the Founder of General Petroleum which he later sold to Standard Oil of New York. Captain Barneson was a Director and Vice President of Standard Oil after the merger.

Captain Barneson was also a pioneer in the use of oil as a fuel for ocean steamers. He was one of the most popular social and business figures in the early 1900s and helped transform the economy of California.

In his memoirs Herbert Hoover wrote:

The matter was not itself so important but it brought me the acquaintance of Captain John Barneson, the president of General Petroleum. Captain John was one of the choice souls in American life. Honest, courageous, frank, generous and loyal, and with a high quality of humor, he had started before the mast; risen to command a naval supply ship in the Spanish–American War; gone into the shipping business for himself; thence into oil fuel business; from there finally into oil production, where he built up the General Petroleum Company to a great industry." (The Memoirs of Herbert Hoover, pg 111)

== Career at sea ==
- Served as First officer of the bark "Wollahra" from 1880 to 1883
- Received his Captain's papers in 1883
- Commanded the English Clipper Ship "George Thompson" from 1885 to 1890
- Retired from the sea in 1890
- Entered the service of the U.S. Government at the outbreak of the Spanish–American War and commanded the USAT Arizona
- Appointed "Marine Superintendent" by the U.S. Government, in which he oversaw all vessels involved in the transportation of troops into the Pacific

== Personal life ==
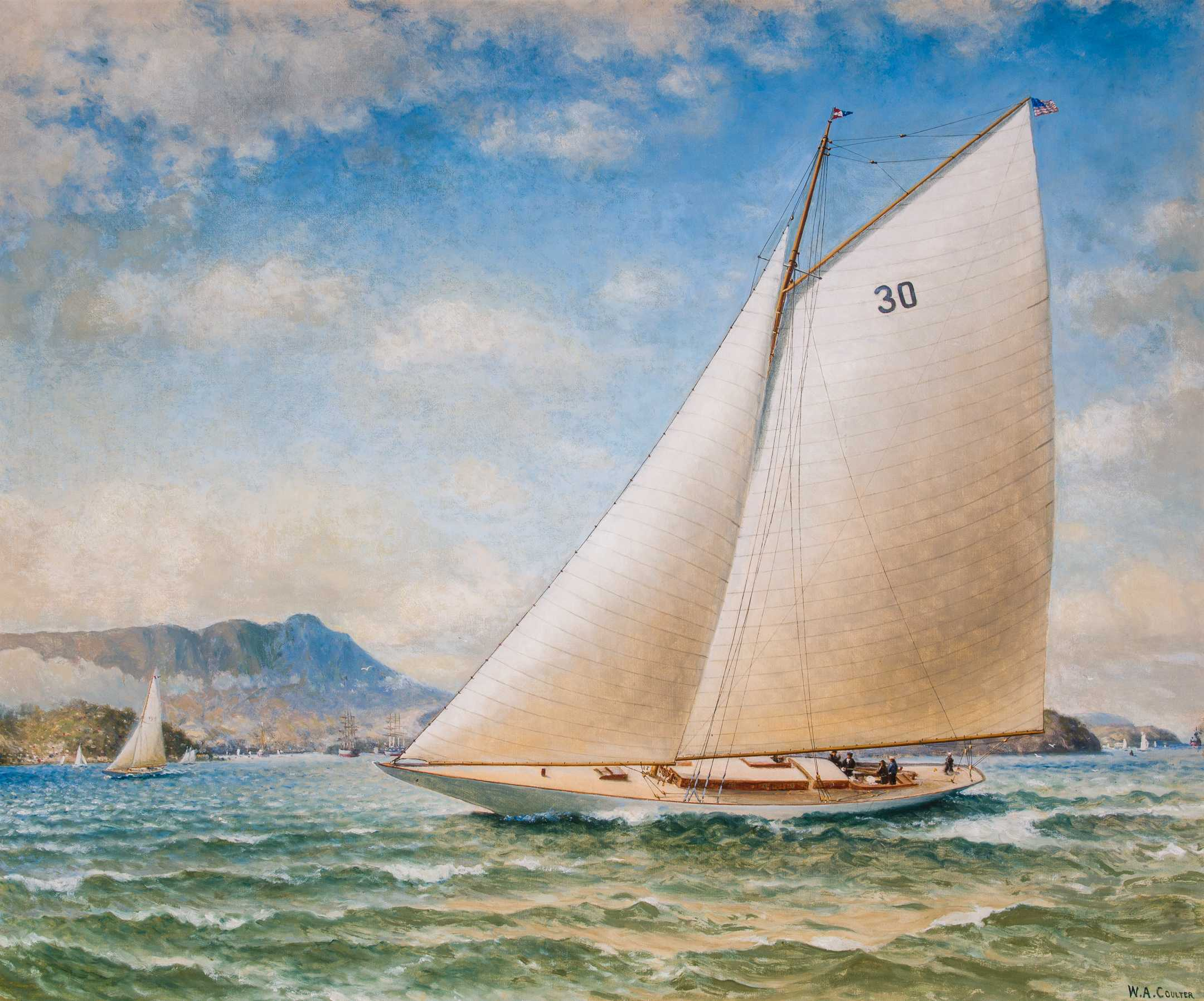
John Barneson's Westward Ho off Point Cavallo, San Francisco, by William A. Coulter

Captain Barneson was the son of James Barneson and Elizabeth Rose Bremner Barneson. He married Harriet Emily Harris in Sydney, Australia on January 8, 1886. They had four children; John Leslie Barneson, Muriel E. Barneson, Lionel T. Barneson and Harold James Barneson (b. 1896 Port, WA, d. 1945 Los Angeles, CA).

He received his education in the public schools of New South Wales.

== Affiliations ==
- American Institute of Mining Engineers
- Panama Pacific Expedition Board Member
- General Petroleum Founder and Managing Director
- General Pipe Line Company Founder and President
- General Construction Company President
- Wabash Oil Company President
- Las Flores Land and Oil Company President
- Coalinga Kettlemen Oil Company Vice President
- Sauer Dough Oil Company Director
- Bankline Oil Company President
- Union Oil Company Director
- Union Provident Director
- San Vincent Land Company
- Santa Barbara Improvement Company
- Residential Development Company
- San Mateo Improvement Company
- San Mateo Hotel Company President
- Barneson-Hibberd Co-founder
- Barneson-Hibberd Warehouse Company Co-founder
- Macondray & Company
- Tyee Whaling Company
- San Francisco Chamber of Commerce Director
- Seattle Yacht Club Member
- Northwest International Yachting Association Commodore 1893
- San Francisco Yacht Club Member
- St. Francis Yacht Club Member
- Pacific Union Club Member
- Union League Club Member
- Olympic Club Member
- Press Club Member
- Bohemian Club Member
- Commercial Club Member
- California Club of Los Angeles Member
- San Mateo Polo Club Vice President
