= James C. Flood Mansion =

Historic house in California, United States

- U.S. National Register of Historic Places
- U.S. National Historic Landmark
- San Francisco Designated Landmark
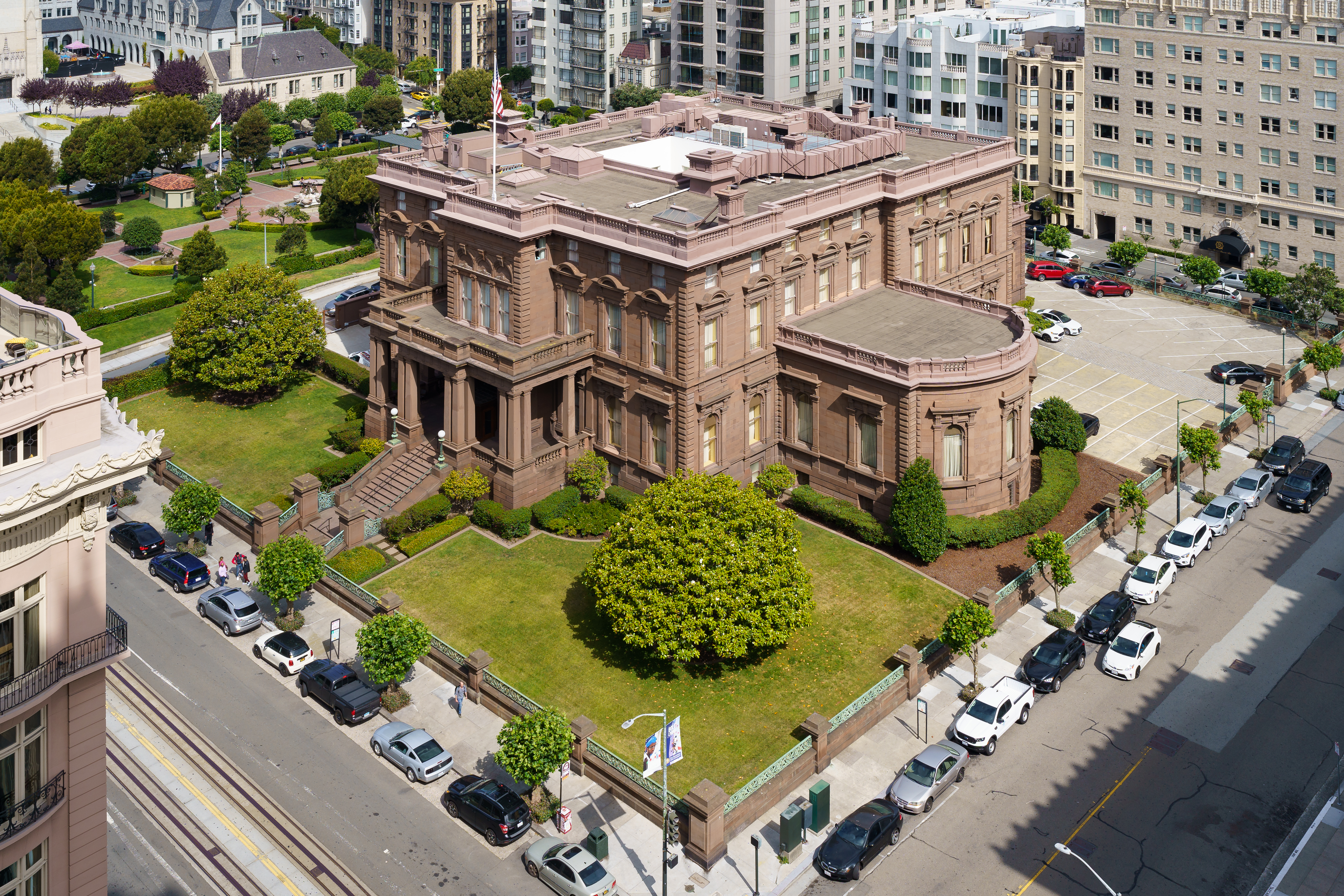
- James Clair Flood Mansion (Pacific-Union Club), 1000 California St, photographed from the 14th floor of the Mark Hopkins Hotel in July 2021

- Location within San Francisco County Location within California Location within the United States
- Location: 1000 California Street, San Francisco, California, USA
- Coordinates: 37°47′31″N 122°24′41″W
- Built: 1886
- Architects: Augustus Laver; Willis Polk
- Architectural style: Neoclassical
- NRHP reference No.: 66000230
- SFDL No.: 64

Significant dates
- Added to NRHP: November 13, 1966
- Designated NHL: November, 1966
- Designated SFDL: 1974

The James C. Flood Mansion is a historic mansion at 1000 California Street, atop Nob Hill in San Francisco, California, USA. Now home of the Pacific-Union Club, it was built in 1886 as the townhouse for James C. Flood, a silver baron. It was the first brownstone building west of the Mississippi River, and the only mansion on Nob Hill to structurally survive the 1906 San Francisco earthquake and fire. It was declared a National Historic Landmark in 1966.

== Description and history ==
The Flood Mansion occupies an entire city block on Nob Hill, bounded by California, Cushman, Mason, and Sacramento streets. The block is fenced on three sides by bronze fencing installed at the time of the mansion's construction. It is a large masonry structure, three stories in height, its exterior finished in brownstone quarried in Portland, Connecticut and shipped around Cape Horn. It is an elaborate expression of Classical Revival architecture, with corner quoining, a balustraded roof edge, and windows framed by pilasters and elaborate pediments. The main entrance, facing California Street, is sheltered by a broad and deep three-bay portico supported by clustered square columns.

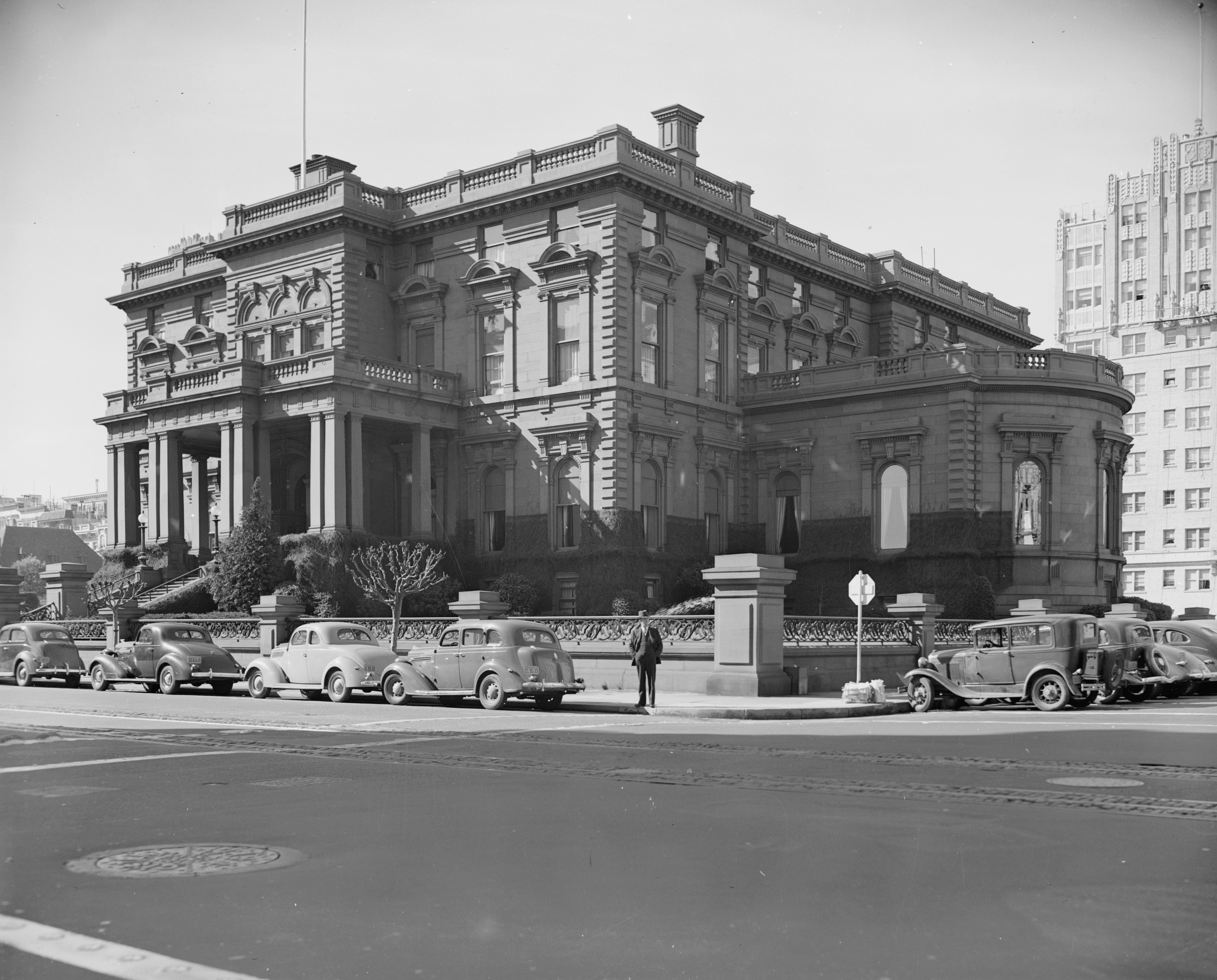
1940

The mansion was built by James C. Flood, who made his fortune in the silver mines of Nevada. His inspiration for the building was the Gilded Age mansions he saw on the East Coast of the United States, so he commissioned one from architect Augustus Laver. Completed in 1888, it was one of his homes until his death in 1889, and was occupied by his daughter when it was gutted during the 1906 earthquake and fire. She sold the shell of the building to the Pacific-Union Club, which originally contemplated tearing it down. It ended up commissioning Willis Polk to design alterations including a third floor and a new interior. These alterations included the use of additional brownstone, furnished from the same quarries as the original material.

The mansion was the only one on Nob Hill to survive the 1906 earthquake and fire; the other mansions on the hill were built of wood, with finishes that gave them the appearance of stone, and were destroyed.

== See also ==
- List of San Francisco Designated Landmarks
- List of National Historic Landmarks in California
- National Register of Historic Places listings in San Francisco
