= George Stephen House =

Mansion in Montreal, Canada

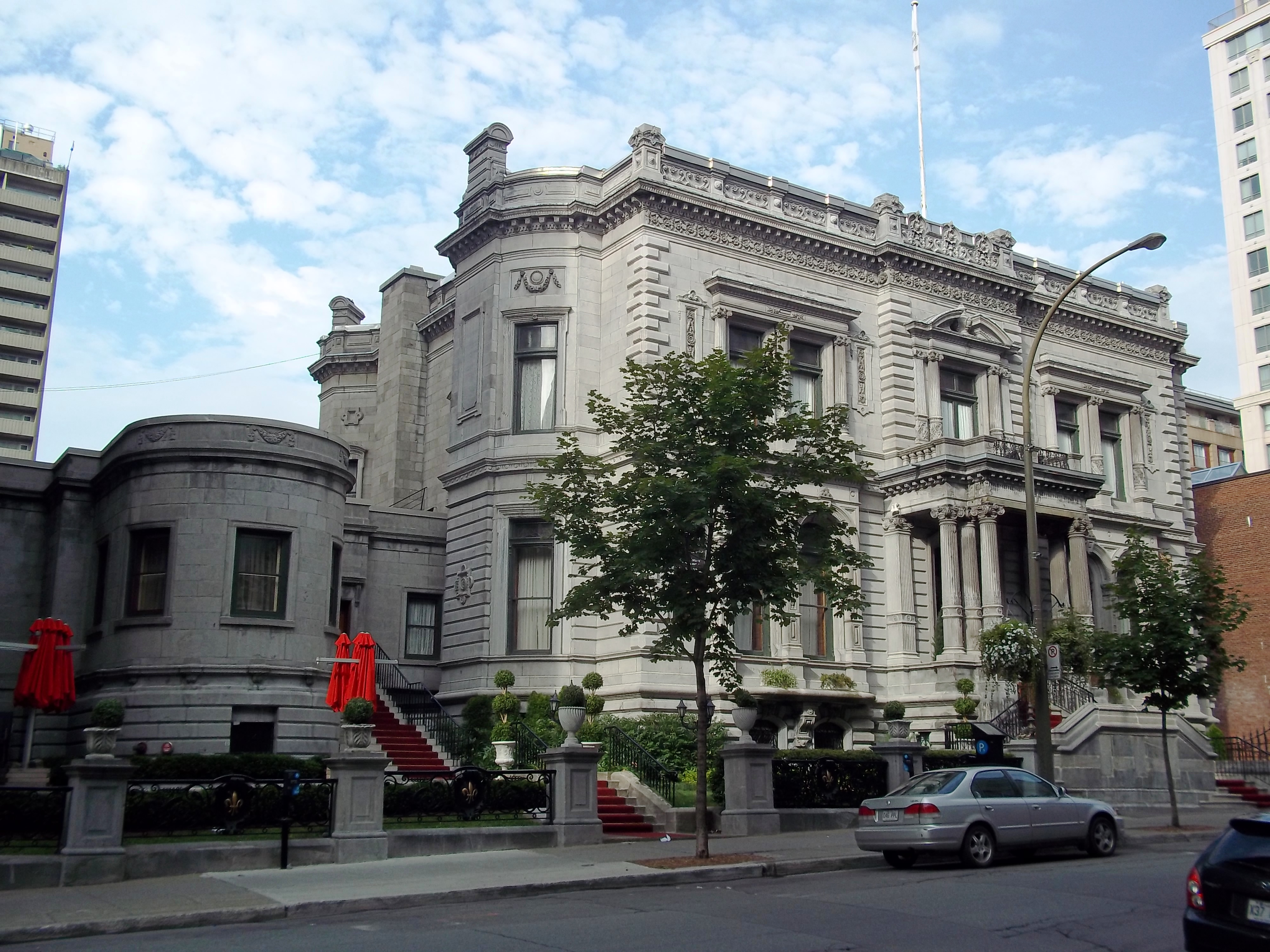
- George Stephen House in 2011, the final year of the Mount Stephen Club
- Interactive map of the George Stephen House area

General information
- Type: Mansion
- Architectural style: Renaissance Revival
- Location: Golden Square Mile, 1430–1440 Drummond Street, Montreal, Quebec, Canada
- Coordinates: 45.499025°N 73.575761°W
- Construction started: 1881
- Completed: 1883
- Client: George Stephen, 1st Baron Mount Stephen
- Owner: Tidan Hospitality and Real Estate Group

Height
- Height: 13.26 m (43.5 ft)

Dimensions
- Other dimensions: 45.72 m (150.0 ft) frontage

Technical details
- Floor count: 3 floors
- Floor area: 2,555 m (8,383 ft)

Design and construction
- Architect: William Tutin Thomas
- Main contractor: F. Casey (superintendant); Archibald McIntyre (woodwork); J. H. Hutchison (masonry); Robert Mitchell & Co. (plumbing, gas & electric fittings)

National Historic Site of Canada
- Official name: George Stephen House National Historic Site
- Designated: 1971

Patrimoine culturel du Québec
- Type: Immeuble patrimonial classé
- Designated: 1975

George Stephen House (also known as the Mount Stephen Club building) is a historic mansion located in the Golden Square Mile in Montreal, Quebec, Canada.

From 1883 to 1896, the house was the residence of George Stephen, 1st Baron Mount Stephen, and then, from 1896 to 1925, of his brother-in-law Robert Meighen and his successors . From 1927 to 2011, the building housed the Mount Stephen Club, a gentlemen's club that brought together Montreal's and international elite. In 2012, a luxury hotel project, called Le Mount Stephen, began to take shape, planned to occupy part of the residence. The project required the construction of a contemporary annexe at the rear, with 90 rooms, shops, and an indoor parking garage with 96 spaces. The hotel's opening, originally scheduled for June 2015, was postponed to May 1, 2017.

Built between 1881 and 1883, the residence was designed by architect William Tutin Thomas in a combination of architectural styles characteristic of Victorian architecture. It blends elements of the Italian Renaissance, Italian Baroque, and 17th-century English Baroque. The Italian Renaissance style, however, is the dominant style of the front façade. The interior, also designed by the same architect, was primarily decorated by the team of carpenter and joiner Archibald McIntyre, stained-glass artist John C. Spence, and the cabinet-making and interior design firm Jacques & Hay of Toronto. Cabinet-maker James Thomson also produced some bespoke furniture for the residence.

The building is subject to certain protection measures. On October 14, 1971, it was declared a National Historic Site of Canada by the Historic Sites and Monuments Board of Canada. It was also designated a heritage building by the Quebec Ministry of Culture and Communications on March 11, 1975. On December 10, 2004, the building was designated a immeuble de valeur patrimoniale exceptionnelle (building of exceptional heritage value) by the City of Montreal. The building was declared to be located within the aire de protection de l’édifice du club Mount Stephent (Mount Stephen Club building protection zone) on April 11, 1978, and within the secteur de valeur patrimoniale exceptionnelle Guy-Drummond (Guy-Drummond sector of exceptional heritage value) on December 10, 2004.

== Site ==
The George Stephen House is located at 1430-1440 Drummond Street in the Golden Square Mile of the Ville-Marie borough of Montreal. It is approximately 2.7 km from Old Montreal. The site is served by the Peel metro station on the green line.

== History ==
=== Before 1881 : land purchase and conception ===
From 1858 to 1863, George Stephen and his wife, Annie Charlotte Kane, lived in a row house in Beaver Hall Square. (Note: Mackay & 1859-1870, p. 315 (Montreal Directory), Year 1857-58) (Note: Mackay & 1859-1870, p. 388 (Montreal Directory), Year 1858-59) (Note: Mackay & 1859-1870, p. 291 (Montreal Directory), Year 1863-64) On September 23, 1863, George Stephen acquired (in his wife's name, Annie Charlotte Kane) the land and residence of William Carter, then located at 213 De la Montagne Street. (Note: Notorial Act, Registry no. 36098, September 23, 1863, A.N.Q.) (Note: Pinard 1987, p. 179) (Note: Mackay & 1859-1870, p. 369 (Montreal Directory), Year 1864-65) (Note: City Assessment for St. Antoine Ward, p. 28 (1863)) The residence was situated on a lot (lot 1525) approximately 44 meters (145 feet) wide by approximately 82 meters (270 feet) deep, bordering De la Montagne Street to the southwest and Drummond Street to the northeast. On February 18, 1875, George Stephen attempted, unsuccessfully, to sell the portion of his land bordering Drummond Street, likely to obtain additional capital needed for the establishment of the Canadian Pacific Railway.

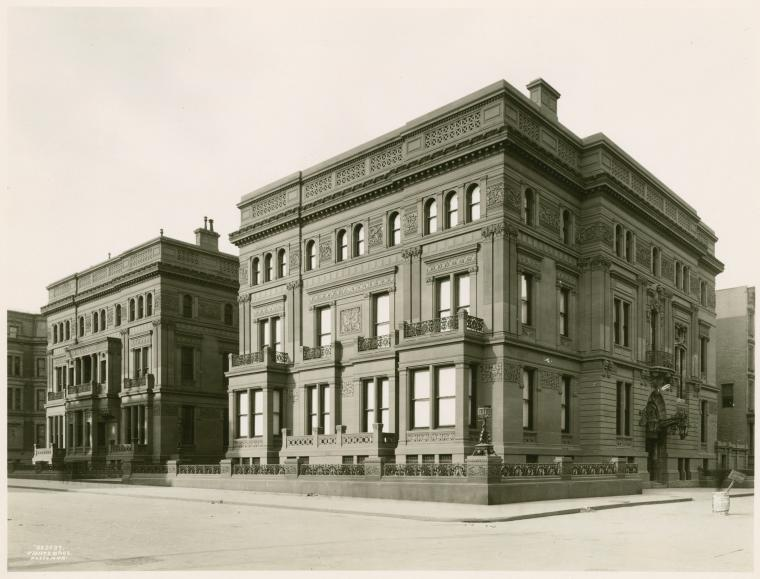
William H. Vanderbilt's mansion on Fifth Avenue in New York.

Around 1880, George Stephen decided to build a new residence on a portion of his property bordering Drummond Street. He then commissioned architect William Tutin Thomas to design and build his future home. Thomas conceived the house as an Italianate palazzo in the Renaissance Revival style or Italianate style. However, no information indicates why this style was chosen, nor whether it was a preference of the architect or the client. On the other hand, the architect is believed to have been inspired by the plans for William H. Vanderbilt's Fifth Avenue mansion in New York, which was then under construction (1880-1882). William Tutin Thomas conceived this residence as a complete work of art, meaning he also designed all the interior decorations as well as all the furniture, which he had custom-made.

=== 1881 to 1883 : construction ===
Years	Construction stages	Architects	Contractors
1881-1883	Construction	William Tutin Thomas	F. Casey (possibly of the Wm. Rutherford & Co. (general contractor)); J. H. Hutchison (masonry); Archibald McIntyre (cabinetmaking and interior woodwork), Robert Mitchell & Co. (plumbing, heating and gas lighting systems); Jacques & Hay (almost all of the furniture, wall hangings, curtains, etc.); James Thomson (part of the custom-made furniture); John Burns & Co. (stove).
Between 1901 and 1903	Replacing the front boundary wall with a wrought iron fence		
1927	Replacement of the greenhouse's glass wall panels with stone walls and extension at the rear	Grattan D. Thompson	Bremner Norris & Co. Limited (Note: City of Montreal Permits and Inspections Department, Permit no. 3176, 1927-07-21.)
1937	Reconstruction of the exterior front staircase on new foundations		The Purdy and Henderson Co. Ltd. (Note: City of Montreal Permits and Inspections Department, Permit no. 2947, 1937-10-20.)
1948	Extension of the south side of the greenhouse		J.L.E. Price & Co. Ltd. (Note: City of Montreal Permits and Inspections Department, Permit no. 2011, 1948-05-07.)
1953	North side extension	Philippe Lebel	L. Gordon Tarlton (Note: City of Montreal Permits and Inspections Department, Permit no. 3618, 1953-06-19.)
1956-57	Rear extension and interior modifications	P. Goodfellow	R. F. Walsh Co. Ltd (Note: City of Montreal Permits and Inspections Department, Permit no. 4817, 1956-07-06.)
1958	Interior modifications on the second floor		R. F. Walsh Co. Ltd (Note: City of Montreal Permits and Inspections Department, Permit no. 2622, 1958-06-02.)
1962	Changes to the kitchen		R. F. Walsh Co. Ltd (Note: City of Montreal Permits and Inspections Department, Permit no. 2307, 1962-06-05.)
Between 1985 and 1989	Cleaning of the exterior walls (Note: Communauté Urbaine de Montréal 1987, p. 674) (Note: Brian Merrett, « Maison Lord Mount Stephen, 1440, rue Drummond, Montréal » Online)		(?)
1996	Removal of 6 trees at the front of the property (Chinese elms) which were damaging the fence and the front yard (Note: City of Montreal Permits and Inspections Department, Permit no. 1001037596-96, 1996-12-03.)		
2004	Au sous-sol et rez-de-chaussée : réaménagement partiel des locaux, réfection des fondations, installation de pieux, aucun travail extérieur (Note: City of Montreal Permits and Inspections Department, Permit no. 1000074704-04, 2004-02-26.)		
2006	On the ground floor: interior redesign and addition of a central air conditioning system. At the rear of the building: a two-level extension (basement and ground floor), the addition of meeting rooms, and the addition of a lean-to for roof access. (Note: City of Montreal Permits and Inspections Department, Permit no. 3000014926-06, 2006-07-10.)		
2007	Construction of a 156 m2 café-terrace in the front courtyard (Note: City of Montreal Permits and Inspections Department, Permit no. 3000022657-07, 2007-05-10.)		
2012	Partial dismantling of the west and north annexes of the building. The rear annex, comprising two levels: the basement, the kitchen, and the Elizabeth room (ground floor level), with a total building area of 609 m2. The north annex, comprising the changing room, has a floor area of 131 m2. (Note: City of Montreal Permits and Inspections Department, Permit no. 3000300903-12, 2012-10-12.)		
2012-2016	Construction of a contemporary hotel at the rear, comprising 80 rooms, shops, and an underground parking garage with approximately 96 spaces. (Note: City of Montreal Permits and Inspections Department, Permit no. 3000319273-12, 2012-11-22.) (Note: City of Montreal Permits and Inspections Department, Permit no. 3000327867-13, 2013-05-01.) (Note: Permit No. 3000327867-13 mentions instead the construction of an 83-room hotel and 95 parking units.)	Lemay / Leclerc Architectes (Équipe d’architectes : Michel Lauzon, Gino Mauri, Didier Heckel, Sandra Neill, Jean-François St-Onge, Bryan Marchand, Jean-François Fortin-Gadoury, Virginie Pontbriand, Damien Leman, Geneviève Telmosse, François Desmarais)	Construction Tidan (Entrepreneur), Nicolet, Chartrand, Knoll Ltd. (Structure), Pageau Morel et associés inc. (Mécanique/Électrique), Technorm (Sécurité du bâtiment et normes), Lemay (Design intérieur)
2015	Unauthorized destruction of the three chimneys (1883), the wrought iron fence (1900-1903), and the wooden cornice on the North facade.	(?) (Five architects were involved in the construction.)	(?)
2016-2017	Installation of a reinforced concrete structure supporting the historic building, including 16 new pillars. Dismantling of the northern section of the east facade, replacement of the original red brick structure with concrete blocks, and reassembly of the facade. Reconstruction of the three chimneys and the wrought-iron fence. Other (miscellaneous).	(?) (Five architects were involved in the construction.)	Firme NCK (Ingénierie civile/Structure), St-Denis Thompson (Maçonnerie) et autres
February 2017	Restoration of the wrought iron fence		(?)
April 2017	Restoration of the exterior staircases		St-Denis Thompson (Masonry)
2026	Restoration of the exterior staircases		St-Denis Thompson (Masonry)

Construction of George Stephen's new residence began in 1881. The superintendance of construction was entrusted to a certain "F. Casey" (possibly Félix Casey of the Wm. Rutherford & Co.), who may also have executed some of the woodwork, such as the building wood structure and windows. J. H. Hutchison carried out the masonry work. The interior woodwork (cabinetmaking, wood paneling and decor, etc.) was done by the team of carpenter and joiner Archibald McIntyre. Robert Mitchell & Co. handled the plumbing, as well as the heating and gas lighting systems. The Jacques & Hay firm of Toronto produced most of the furniture according to the designs of architect William Tutin Thomas. Cabinetmaker James Thomson also contributed to the production of some furniture. George Stephen was able to closely observe the construction of his new residence from his home. (Note: Rémillard 1986, p. 107)

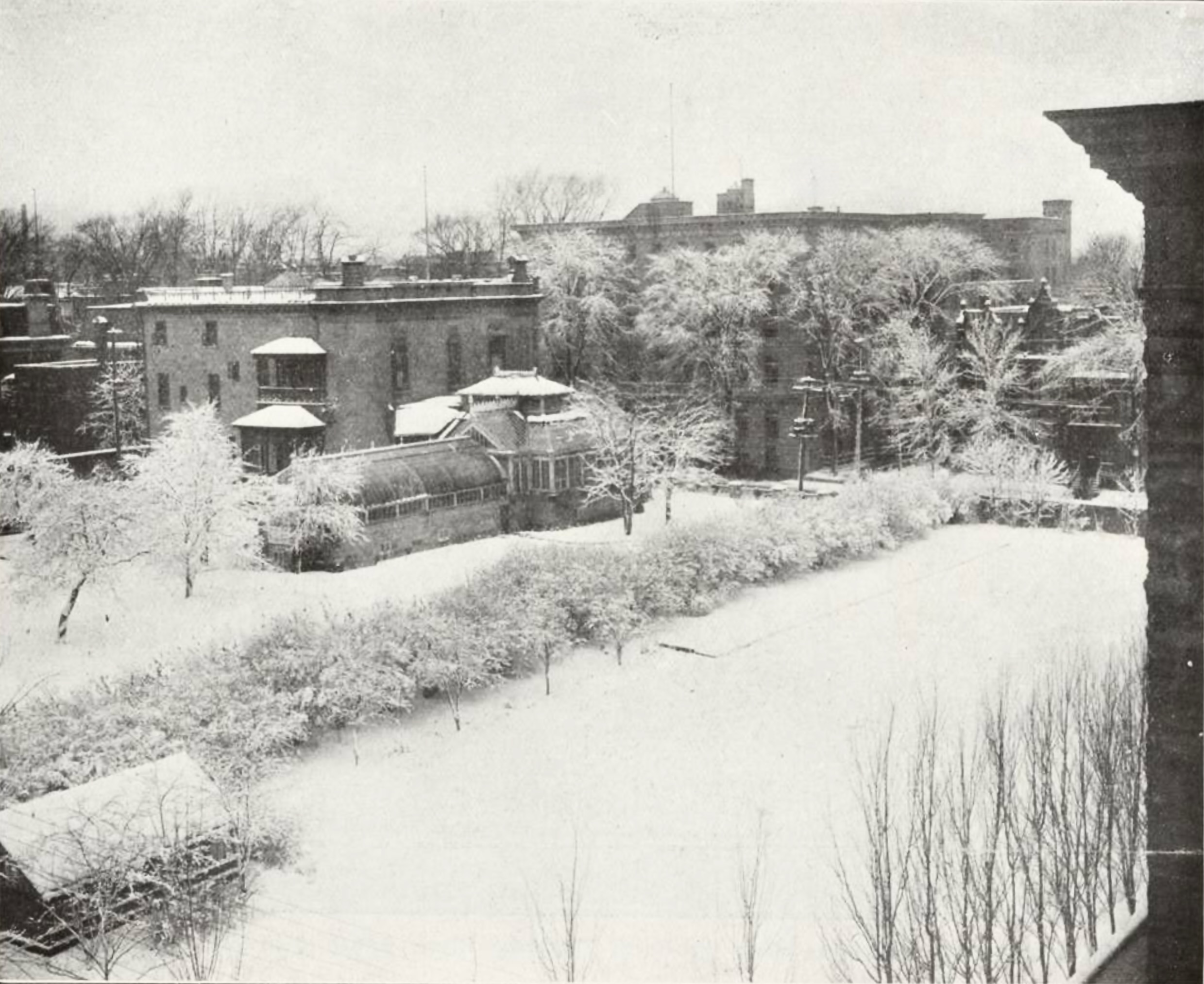
Photograph taken in 1912 showing the original extent of George Stephen's estate.

On March 25, 1882, the newspaper The Daily Witness reported that construction of the house was "nearing completion." However, work continued until the end of May 1883. Moreover, given the clay soil of the site, the foundations rested on five hundred wooden piles. George Stephen and his wife, Annie Charlotte Kane, moved into their new residence in June 1883. However, the interior decoration and furnishings, as well as the landscaping, were not yet finished. For example, the decorations in the main living room (paneling, fireplace, and wall hangings) were still not installed, nor were some of the stained-glass windows, including those in the stairwell. Outside, the stable was still not built.

During the summer of 1883, stained-glass artist John C. Spence completed the installation of the stained-glass windows. The decoration and furnishings of the main living room were also gradually completed during this period. A new stable facing De la Montagne Street was built. On September 6, 1883, George Stephen auctioned off all the furnishings from his previous residence at 339 De la Montagne Street. Toward the end of 1883 or the beginning of 1884, George Stephen's former home and its outbuildings were demolished. Consequently, the landscaping of the estate was likely completed during the summer of 1884.

Evolution of the Stephen's estate

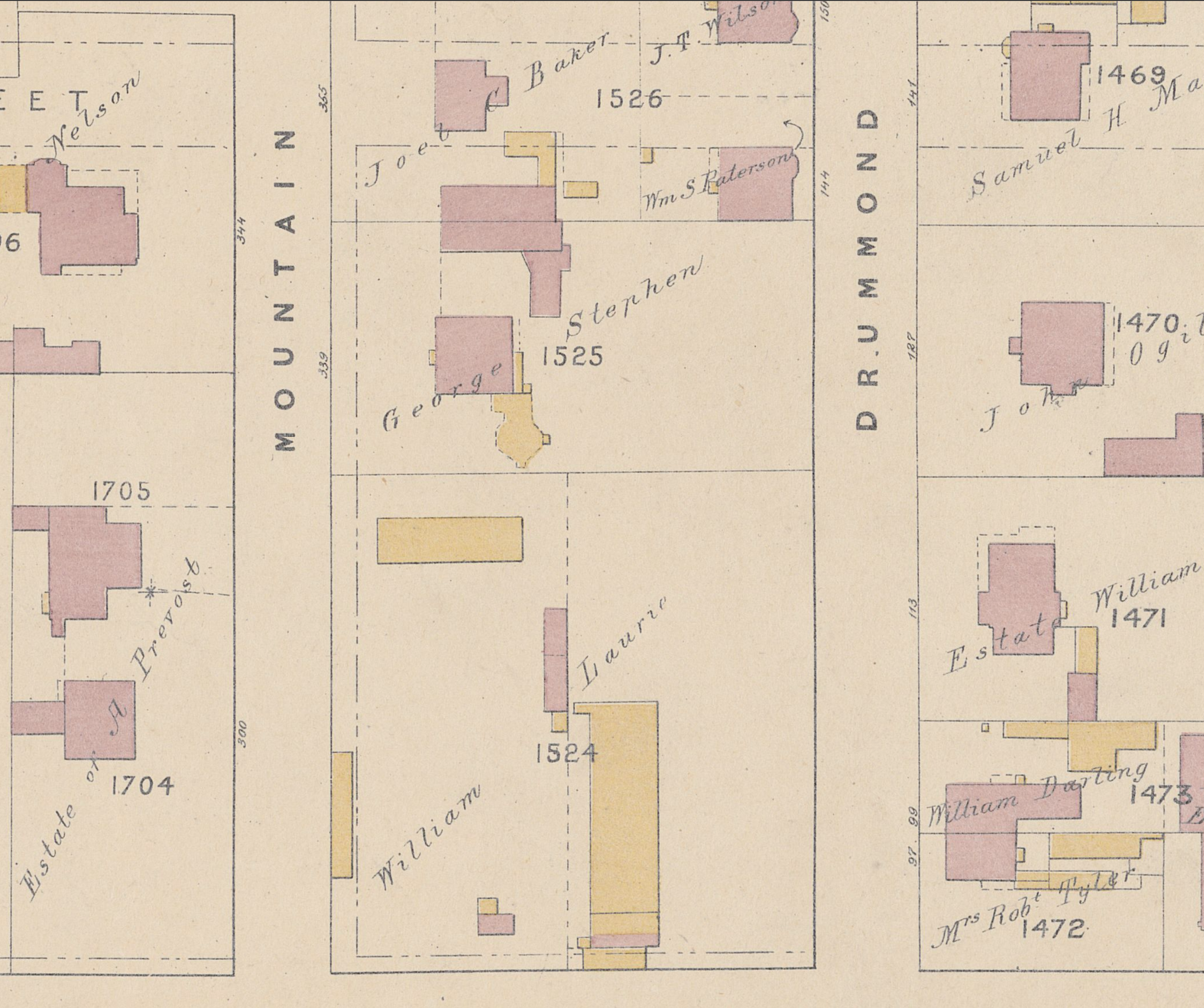
Circa 1881

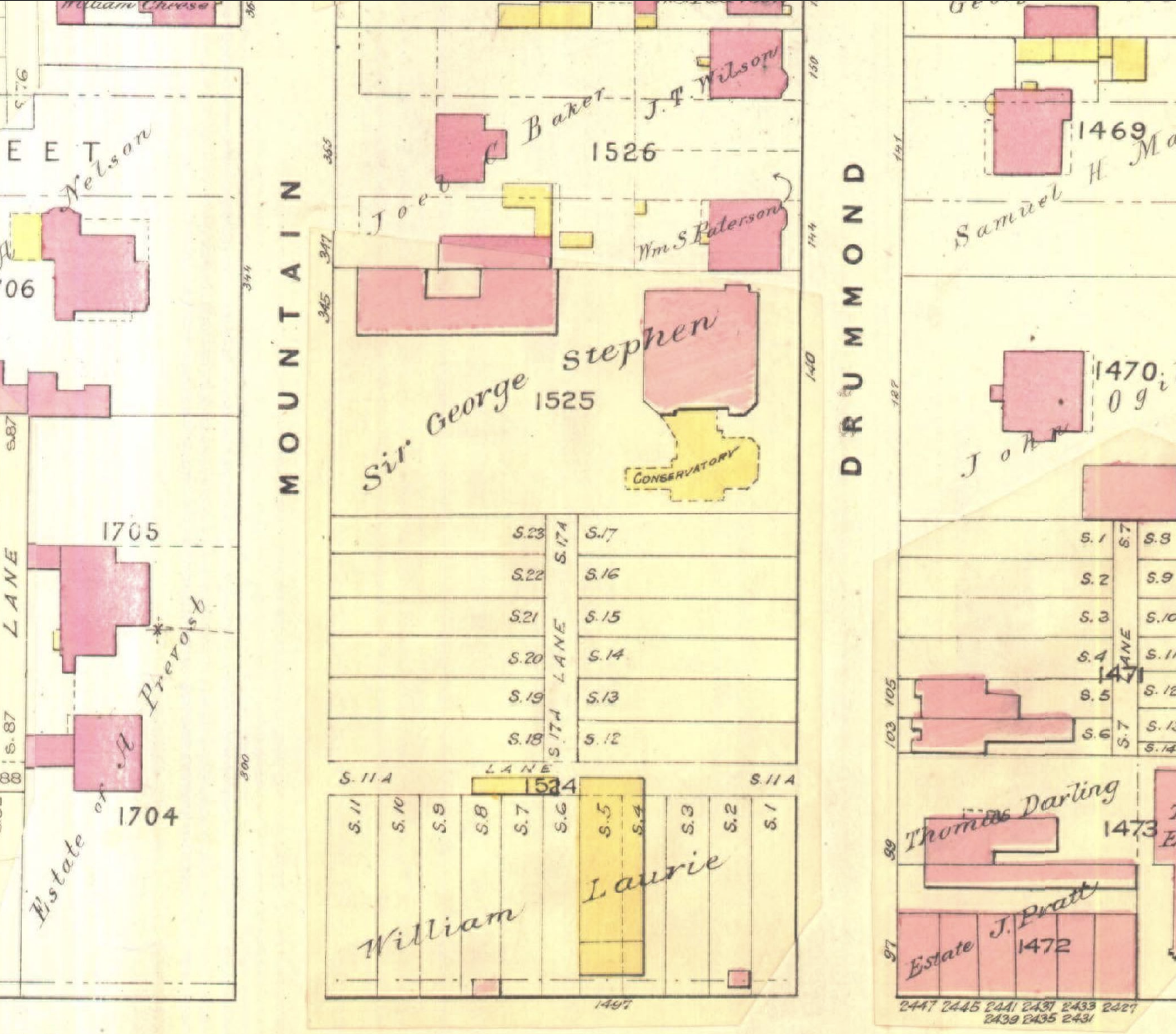
Circa 1890

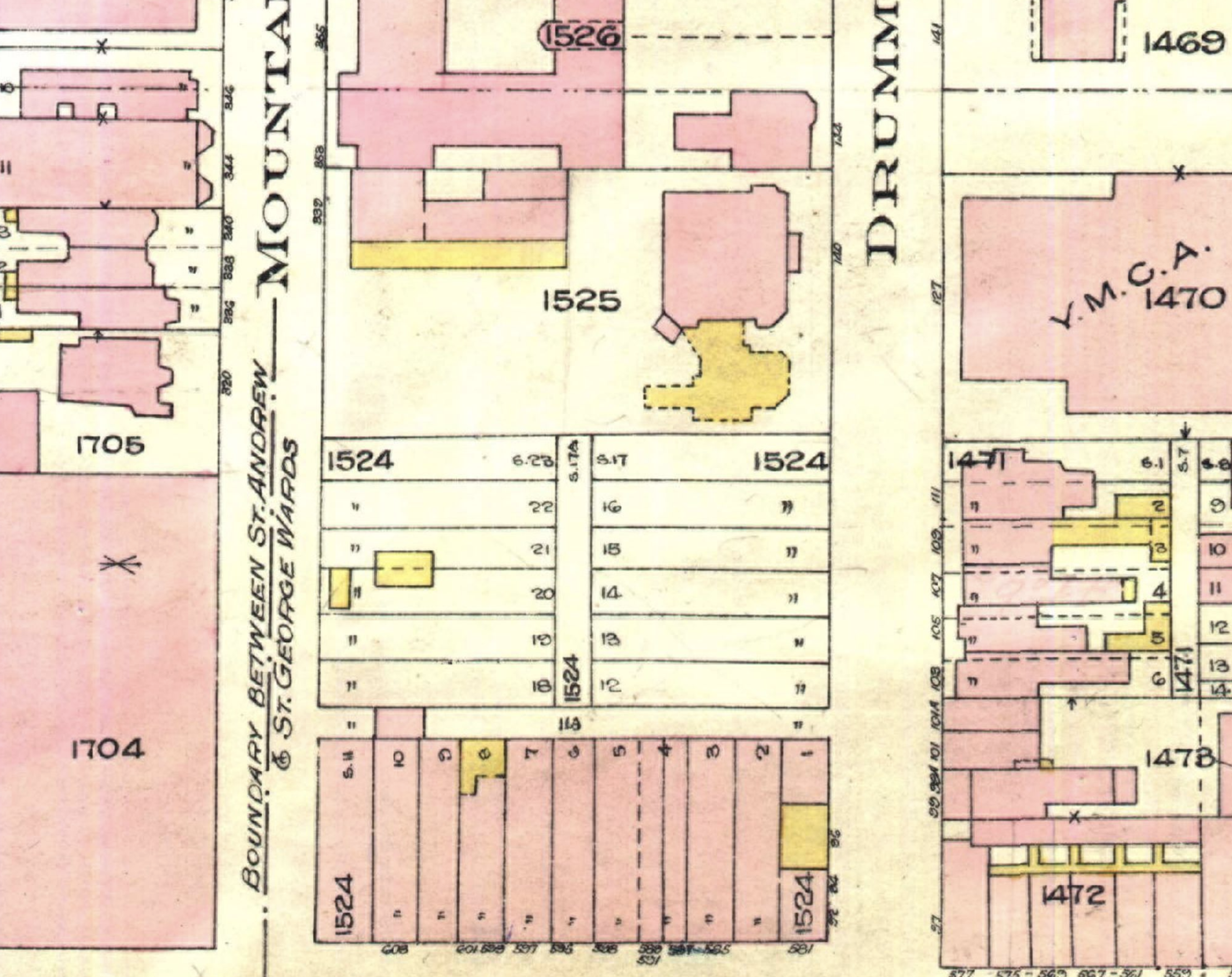
Circa 1912

=== 1883 to 1896 : George Stephen, 1st Baron Mount Stephen ===
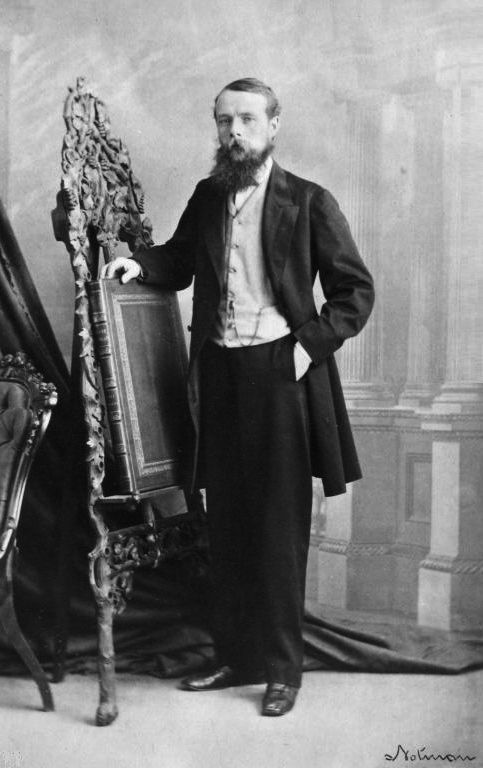
George Stephen, baron Mount Stephen

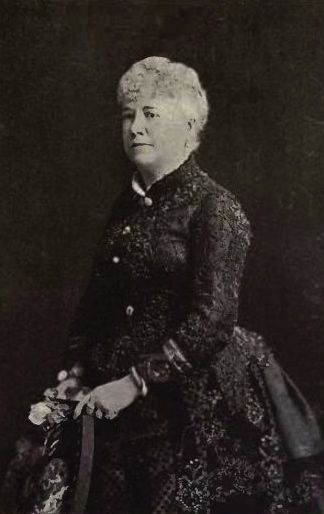
Annie Charlotte Kane, baroness Mount Stephen

On September 18, 1883, George Stephen inaugurated his new residence with a reception held in honour of Lord Carnarvon, who was visiting Montreal at the time. Among the guests were the Lieutenant Governor of Quebec, Théodore Robitaille, the Lieutenant Governor of Ontario, John Beverley Robinson, Sir Samuel Leonard Tilley, Sir Hector-Louis Langevin, and the Honourable Edward Blake.

On September 25, 1883, George Stephen received the Governor General of Canada, John Campbell, Marquess of Lorne, and his wife, Princess Louise, for a visit of a few days.

In addition to building a new residence in Montreal, George Stephen acquired a townhouse on Park Lane in London around October 1883.

During the summer of 1884, George Stephen had a piano delivered, specially designed for his residence by the architect William Tutin Thomas and manufactured by the Decker Brothers company of New York.

On September 15, 1884, George Stephen received Lord and Lady Lansdowne at his residence. They stayed at George Stephen's house again on January 26, 1885.

In March 1885, George Stephen's gardener, J. Stanford, won first prize from the Montreal Horticultural Society for the best-maintained greenhouses in the city. He won first prize again in March 1886.

In January 1886, George Stephen was created a baronet.

In August 1886, a delegation from the United Caledonian Association of North America visited George Stephen's house, among other residences. Among the members of this delegation was the mayor of Philadelphia, William Burns Smith.

In October 1886, George Stephen purchased the Métis River and seigneury from Judge U. J. Tessier for $CAD 20,000. He then commissioned his architect, William Tutin Thomas, to design a summer residence, called "Estevan Lodge", for him in Métis. The general construction contract was awarded to Simon Peters of Quebec City.

On October 31, 1887, George Stephen hosted a "Millionaires' Luncheon," bringing together Calvin S. Bryce, J. H. Shaw, Col. Payne, H. L. Terril, and J. G. Moore.

In August 1888, George Stephen announced his resignation as Chairman of the Board of Directors of the Canadian Pacific Railway. He explained his decision as follows: "From the moment I signed the contract with the federal government for the construction of the Canadian Pacific Railway and accepted the position of Chairman of the Company, I always intended to relinquish the operational management of the Company as soon as the task I had then undertaken was completed. This task was practically finished when the line was opened to traffic to the Pacific Ocean more than two years ago. [...] I agreed to remain in office for a certain time. However, my health has warned me: noting that the heavy and constant strain I have had to endure over the past eight years no longer allows me to perform the continuous and arduous duties of a workload [...]." Despite his resignation, he remained one of the principal shareholders of the Canadian Pacific Railway.

On October 13, 1888, George Stephen acquired lots 1524-12 to 1524-23 in the southeast of William Laurier's property for $CAD 49,000, thus expanding it "as far as the alley" near Saint Catherine Street. (Note: Notorial Act, Registry no. 116483, October 13, 1888, A.N.Q.)

On April 24, 1889, after spending a few months in the United Kingdom, George Stephen and his wife returned to Canada.

On May 5, 1890, the Stephens hosted a dinner in honor of the soprano Emma Albani, who was visiting Montreal.

On June 2 and 3, 1890, George Stephen and his wife hosted the Duke and Duchess of Connaught and Strathearn at their residence during their visit to Montreal. On June 2, they hosted a dinner for 24 guests in their honor, and on June 3, more than 270 guests were invited to a ball held in their honor at the residence. (Note: Mount Stephen Club, Montreal 1967, p. 10) George Stephen was created a baron in 1891, taking the name "Mount Stephen."

In April 1892, Lord Mount Stephen decided to put his Drummond Street residence up for sale, as he "now spends most of his time in England and Scotland and will probably be content with hotel accommodations during his visits to Montreal." William Christopher Macdonald expressed interest for a time, but ultimately did not purchase it. Some of the city's millionaires suggested turning it into a new private club, but the idea did not materialize. In November 1893, some proposed making it the residence of the Governor General of Canada in Montreal, but again, the idea did not materialize. In February 1896, newspapers announced that the residence had been "acquired" by Robert Meighen, general manager of the Lake of the Woods Milling Company and brother-in-law of George Stephen. The nature of the transaction was not explained in the newspapers, however, as the property was not officially transferred to Robert Meighen until October 4, 1900. (Note: Notorial Act, Registry no. 134267, October 4, 1900, A.N.Q.) In the meantime, Lord and Lady Mount Stephen moved to Brocket Hall in Herefordshire, England.

Upon the death of Annie Charlotte Kane on April 10, 1896, the residence at 140 Drummond became the property of George Stephen. (Note: Notorial Act, Registry no. 131156, July 6, 1896, A.N.Q.) Lord Mount Stephen died in 1921 and was buried in the small chapel at Brocket Hall, located near the entrance gate to the estate. His tombstone reads: "Wise in his benefactions, of stainless integrity."

=== 1896 to 1925 : Robert Meighen and Elsie Stephen ===
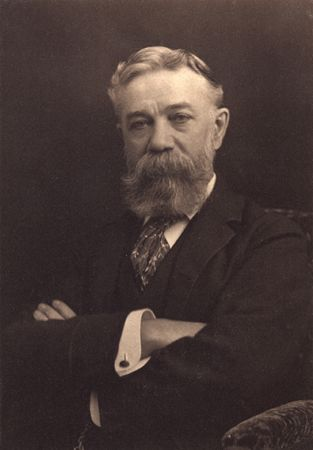
Robert Meighen

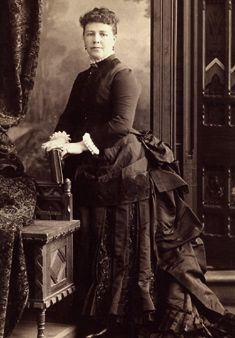
Elsie Stephen

In March 1896, Robert Meighen and Elsie Stephen moved into their new residence on Drummond Street. On April 15, 1896, they inaugurated their residence with a somber event: the funeral of Elsie Stephen and Lord Mount-Stephen's brother, John Stephen, who had settled in Guelph, Ontario. (Note: Mackay & 1859-1870, p. 825 (Montreal Directory), Year 1895-96) (Note: Mackay & 1859-1870, p. 824 (Montreal Directory), Year 1896-97)

On November 11, 1898, Robert Meighen and Elsie Stephen hosted a debutante ball in honor of their daughter, Margaret Meighen. More than two hundred people were invited.

On October 4, 1900, the residence officially became the property of Robert Meighen, who purchased it for $CAD 100,000.

Between 1901 and 1903, Robert Meighen made some alterations to the residence. For example, he replaced the stone wall bordering the Drummond Street sidewalk with a wrought-iron fence punctuated by stone pilasters. It is also possible that the raffia tapestries in the stairwell were installed during this same period. Around 1905, Robert Meighen spent CAD 1,600 to have the sidewalk along his Drummond Street residence repaved.

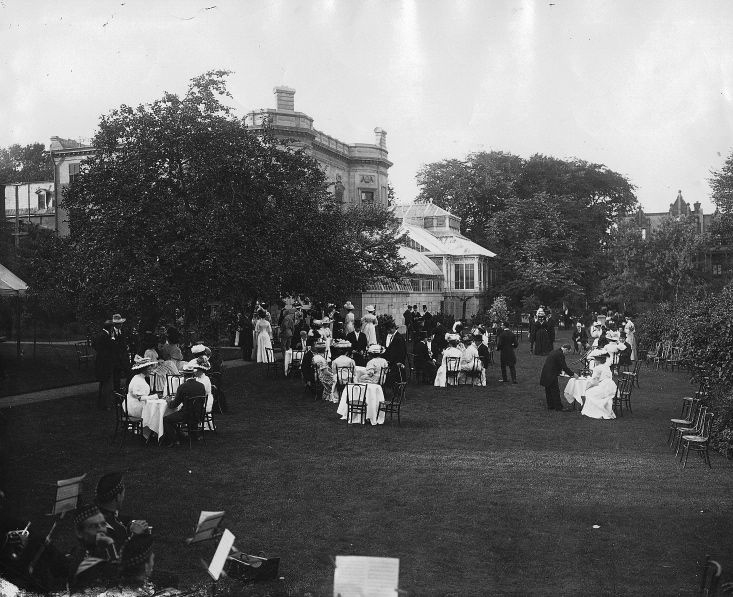
Garden party given in hornor of Lord Frederick Roberts in 1908

In 1907, Robert Meighen hosted Lord Northcote, former Governor-General of Australia, and his wife, Alice Stephen, known as Lady Northcote. (Note: Alice Stephen, known as Lady Northcote, was the adopted daughter of George Stephen. She married Lord Henry Northcote in 1873. (Source :Chris Cunneen (1988). "Henry Stafford Northcote (1846–1911)". Dictionary of Australian Biography. Sydney, Australia.: Melbourne University Press.))

To mark Quebec City's tercentenary in 1908, Meighen organized an open-air reception in honor of British Field Marshal and 1st Earl of Roberts, Frederick Roberts, and his wife, Nora Henrietta Bews, Countess of Roberts, during their visit to Montreal on July 31, 1908. Eight hundred people were invited to the reception.

On July 13, 1911, Robert Meighen died at his residence from a heart condition. Elsie Stephen died on July 12, 1917. Upon Robert Meighen's death, the residence passed to their daughter, Margaret Meighen (later Margaret Harley).

Their son, Colonel Frank Stephen Meighen, lived in the residence after his parents' death and continued the family's tradition of hospitality. In 1919, he hosted a ball there in honor of Edward Windsor, Prince of Wales.

During the First World War, the introduction of income tax to finance the war effort and the Great Depression forced many homeowners to abandon their elegant houses in the Golden Square Mile. The Stephen-Meighen family was not spared and, in 1925, decided to put the residence up for sale, along with all the surrounding land, which was subdivided. As for the furnishings, they were, according to Robert Meighen's last wishes, distributed among his children. (Note: Notorial Act, Registry no. 151528, December 7, 1906, A.N.Q.)

=== 1926 to 2011 : Mount Stephen Club ===
On July 16, 1926, Don Mar Realty Limited acquired the George Stephen House. This company then sold it on October 14, 1927, (Note: Notorial Act, Registry no. 157679, October 14, 1927, A.N.Q.) to the Mount Stephen Club, a gentlemen's club founded in 1926 by Noah Timmins, J. H. Maher, and J. S. Dohan. (Note: Mount Stephen Club, Montreal 1967, p. 11) These gentlemen were the first to advocate for the preservation of the George Stephen House and did everything in their power to protect this elegant townhouse from demolition and to preserve its original interior features. (Note: Rémillard 1986, p. 109) In fact, this objective was the key to the almost complete preservation of the residence until 2015. At that time, any additions, alterations, or modernization work on the former residence had to respect this preservation goal. Furthermore, they named the club "Mount Stephen" in honor of the residence's first owner, George Stephen.

The conversion of the residence into a private club, however, led the new owner to make some modifications. The most notable was the replacement in 1927 of the glass walls of the conservatory with cut stone walls. That same year, the building's new purpose also prompted the club to make changes to the kitchens, some of the equipment, and the basement rooms. The club officially opened on December 12, 1927.

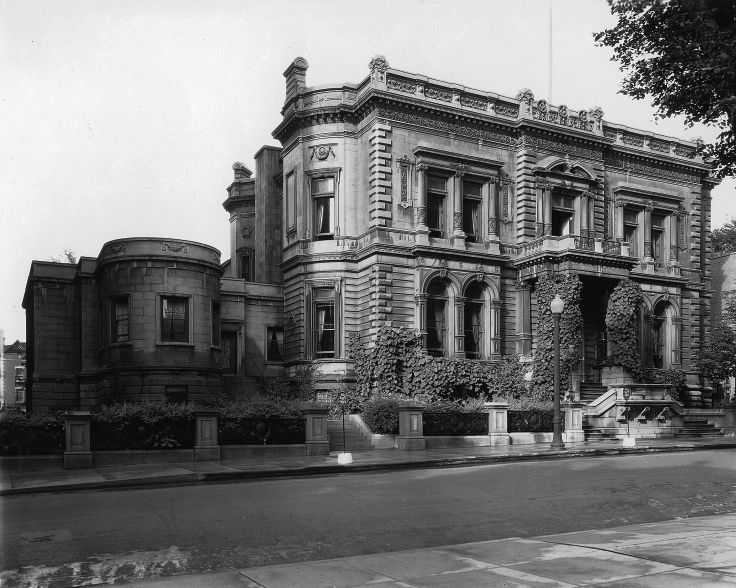
Mount Stephen Club (circa 1934-1935)

In 1937, the exterior staircase was rebuilt on new foundations. At that time, the small balcony supported by three elegant brackets decorated with flowers was removed.

Subsequently, the club undertook a series of expansions through the construction of annexes and interior modifications to better meet the needs of the club and its clientele. (Note: Communauté Urbaine de Montréal 1987, p. 675) In 1948, the club expanded the south side of the greenhouse. In 1953, the institution built an annex at the rear. It also carried out interior modifications from 1956 to 1958 and in 1962 (kitchens).

On October 14, 1971, the residence was declared a National Historic Site of Canada by the Historic Sites and Monuments Board of Canada. It was also designated a heritage building by the Quebec Ministry of Culture and Communications on March 11, 1975. On December 10, 2004, the building was declared a "immeuble de valeur patrimoniale exceptionnelle" (building of exceptional heritage value) by the City of Montreal. (Note: Règlement no. 04-047, Ville de Mtl) The building was also declared to be located within the "aire de protection de l’édifice du club Mount Stephent" (Mount Stephen Club building protection zone) on April 11, 1978, and within the "Secteur de valeur patrimoniale exceptionnelle Guy-Drummond" (Guy-Drummond sector of exceptional heritage value) on December 10, 2004.

In 2004, the club undertook emergency repairs costing two million dollars to correct structural problems identified since 2001, caused by the construction of several skyscrapers with nearby underground parking garages. The Ministry of Culture and Communications also contributed $50,000 to the club for this project.

In 2005, a hotel project emerged: the "Le Cristofe Alexandre" hotel. Designed by architect Karl Fischer, a twenty-one (21) story tower would have been erected at the corner of Drummond Street and De Maisonneuve Boulevard, adjacent to the George-Stephen House, but connected to it by a modern shared entrance. The hotel was originally scheduled to open in 2008. However, this project was cancelled.

In 2006, the name "Club Mount Stephen" was acquired by the Tidan hotel and real estate group. On May 26, 2006, this same group purchased the residence for $4 million from the former Club Mount Stephen, established in 1926. (Note: Online land registry, pp. Lot 1328870 (City of Montreal, Cadaster of Quebec)) The latter legal entity was officially dissolved on June 4, 2010. Starting in 2006, the club's new management sought to improve the facilities and services offered to its 400 members. First, they invested nearly $4 million, notably in adding a central air conditioning system, expanding some reception rooms, and adding new meeting rooms. They also attempted to adopt a new marketing strategy to attract young Montrealers to membership. Finally, they opened the club to the general public for musical dinners on Saturdays and musical brunches on Sundays. Despite all attempts to revitalize the club, the Tidan Group failed to make the institution profitable, even though their past investments had increased revenues. On December 23, 2011, management made the decision to permanently close the club, resulting in the loss of 70 full-time and part-time jobs. The club's closure prompted Heritage Montreal to place the George-Stephen House under observation on its list of threatened Montreal landmarks in 2012.

Throughout its history, the Mount Stephen club has welcomed Montreal's and international elite. Numerous dignitaries, politicians, and celebrities have graced the club, including Princess Benedikte of Denmark, Princess Margaret, Countess of Snowdon (in 1958), French Air Force General Edmond Jouhaud, Field Marshal and 1st Earl Wavell Archibald Wavell, John Diefenbaker, Percival Molson, Edgar Bronfman Sr., Pierre Elliott Trudeau, Brian Mulroney, René Lévesque, Lucien Bouchard, Louise Harel, Sarto Fournier, and Pierre Bourque. (Note: Piquette, Gerzovitz 2001, p. 8)

=== 2012 to present: Hotel Le Mount Stephen ===
In 2012, a luxury hotel project, the Hotel Le Mount Stephen, began to take shape, partially occupying the former residence. This project required the construction of a contemporary annex at the rear, costing $25 million. Designed by the firm Lemay / Leclerc Architects, this new eleven-story annex includes 80 guest rooms, reception and meeting rooms, a spa, a jacuzzi, a sauna, a massage and fitness room, a restaurant, boutiques, and an underground parking garage with nearly 96 spaces.

That same year, this architectural firm received an award of excellence from the Canadian Architect Awards of Excellence for the design of the Mount Stephen Hotel building. Construction of the hotel began in 2012 with the demolition of the west and north wings. Its opening was then scheduled for June 2015.

On May 29, 2012, the Quebec Ministry of Culture and Communications approved the project without any warnings regarding potential structural problems should a skyscraper be built nearby. Furthermore, the hotel plans were approved by the Ministry on April 11, 2013.

Construction of the hotel Le Mount Stephen

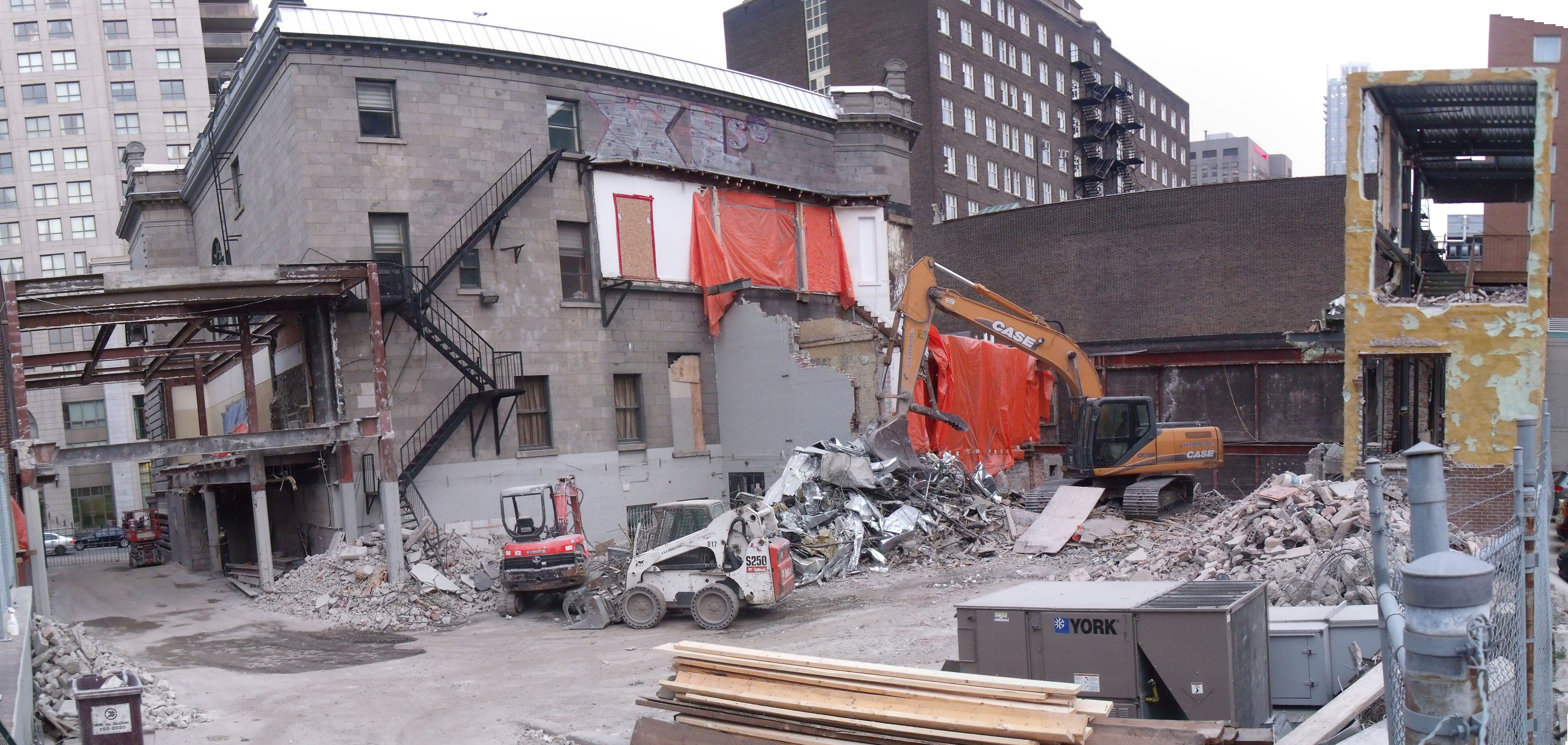
Destructions of annexes (November 2012)

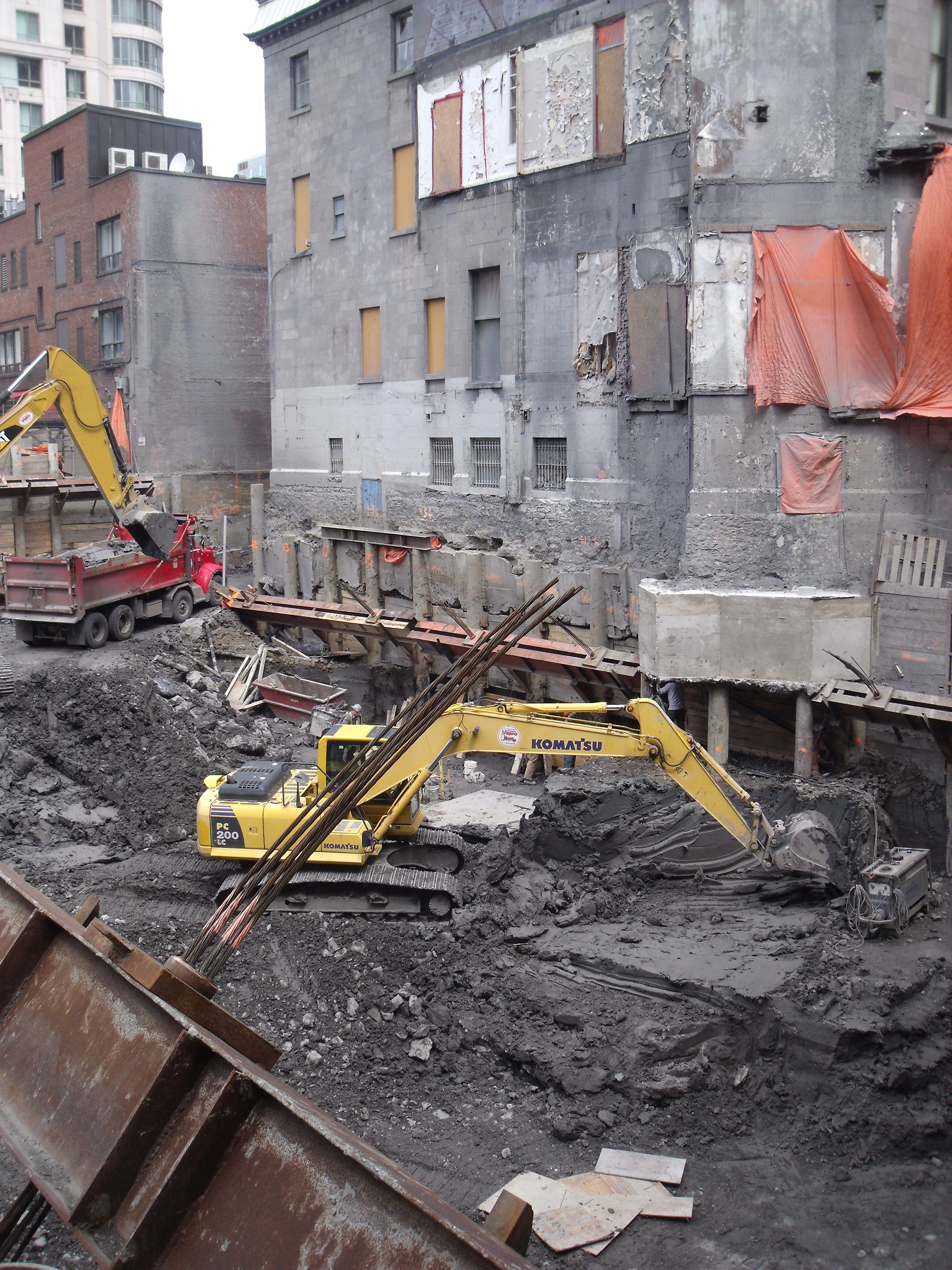
Excavation work (May 2013)

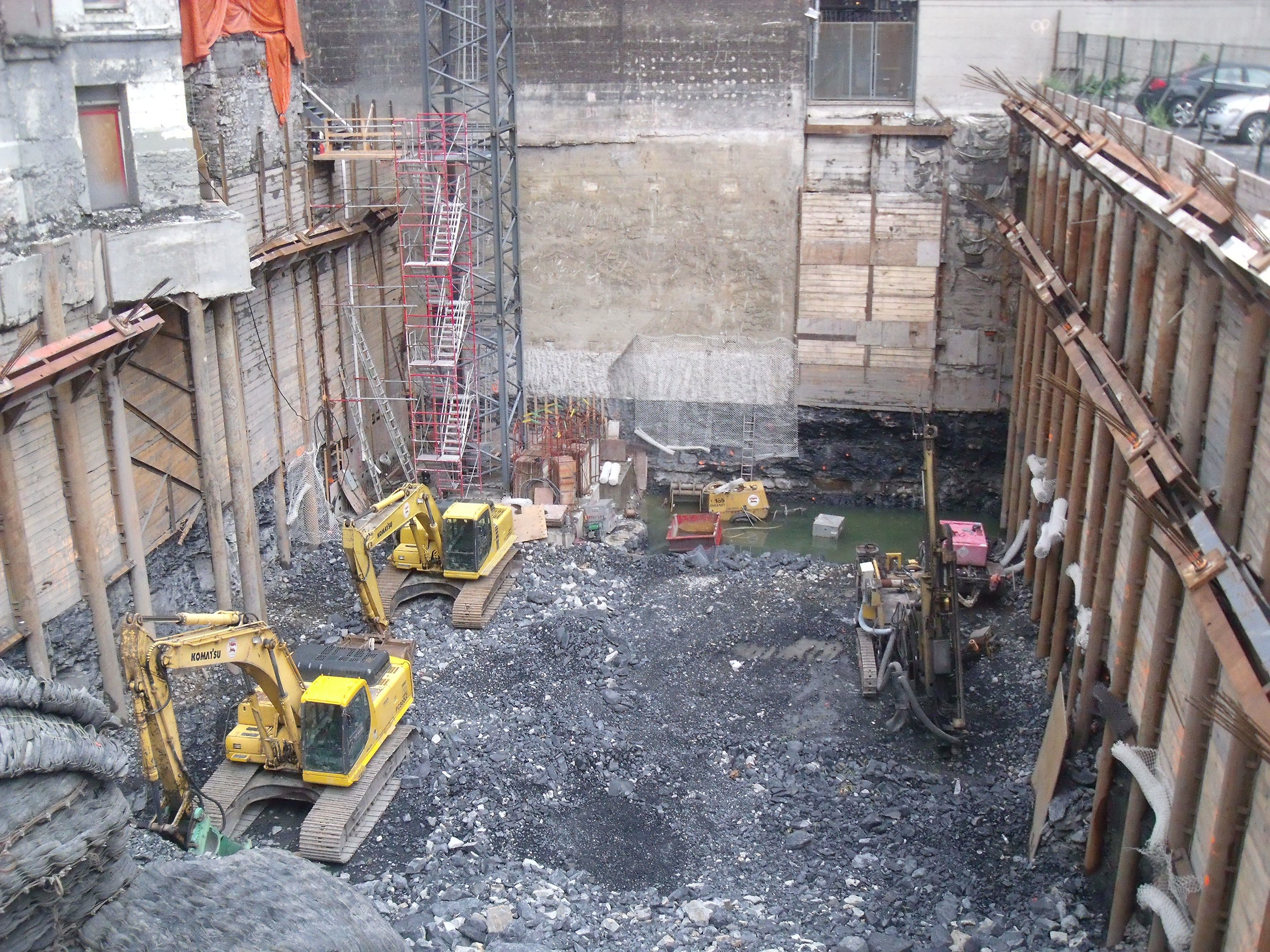
Excavation work (August 2013)

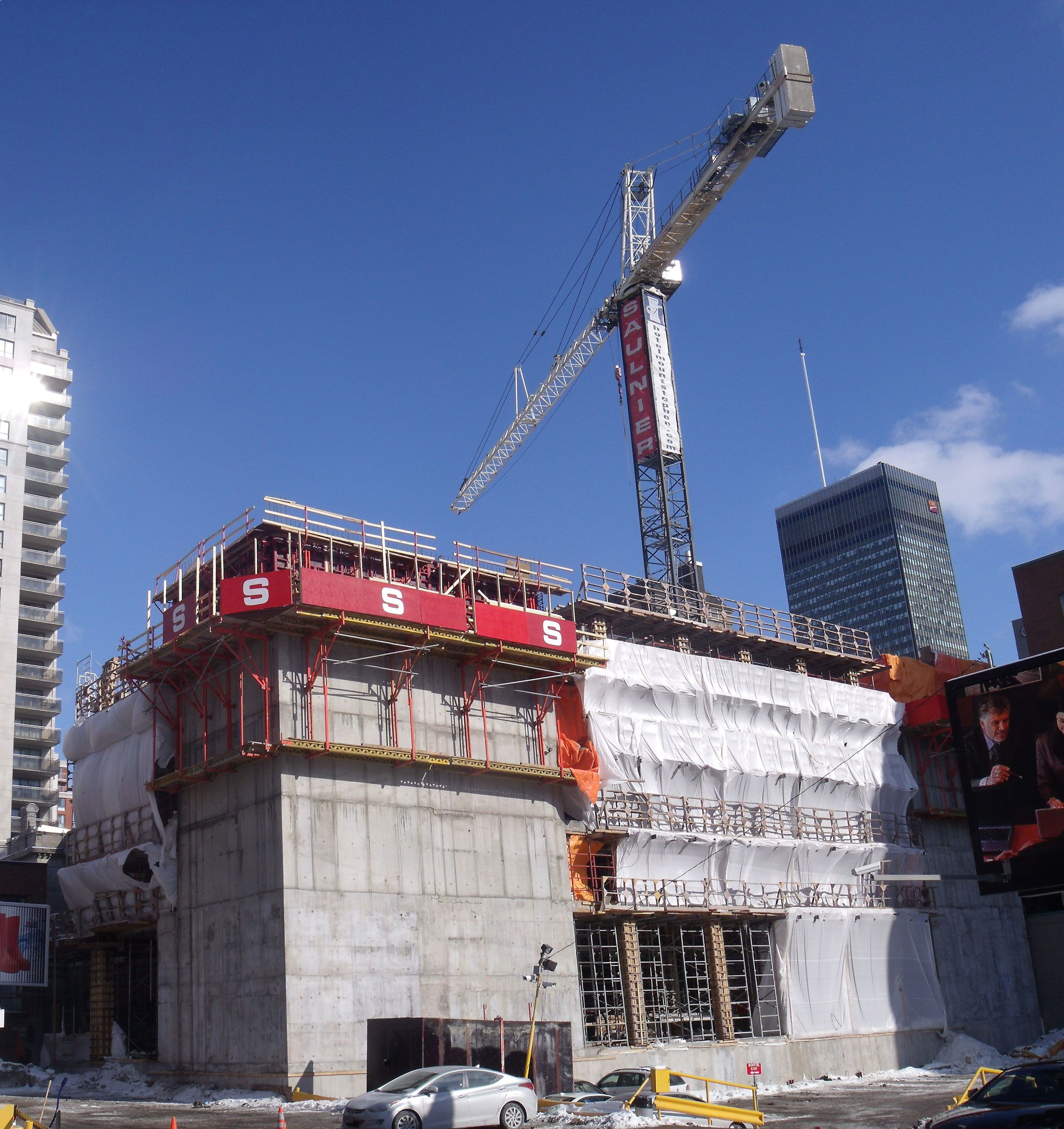
Construction of the hotel building (February 2014)

On January 26, 2016, The Montreal Gazette revealed that the house was suffering from a "significant structural problem" that developed during the construction of the hotel located behind it. Several cracks had appeared on the east (front) and north facades, forcing the construction team to erect temporary support beams to prevent the facade from collapsing. The damage was so "serious" that Franz Knoll, a civil engineer hired by the hotel, announced that the east facade would have to be demolished and rebuilt once the structure was reinforced.

According to Pieter Sijpkes of McGill University, measures should have been taken from the outset to reinforce the structure before proceeding with the excavation of the underground parking garage. He explains that Montreal is built on clay soil that subsides when it loses moisture. Therefore, when a construction crew excavates a site, they pump out water and, consequently, affect the soil's moisture levels.

In addition, the newspaper reveals that the Quebec Ministry of Culture and Communications is suing the owners of the house (Note: Jack Sofer, Meir (Mike) Yuval and their company 9166-9093 Quebec Inc.) for having modified historical architectural elements of the building without authorization, such as the demolition of three chimneys (built in 1883), the destruction of the wrought iron fence (built between 1900 and 1903) or the covering of cut stones with cement.

On March 22, 2016, The Montreal Gazette revealed that no building inspector from the Ville-Marie borough visited the George-Stephen house for 15 months during the construction of the hotel, that is, from August 19, 2014 to November 6, 2015.

The latest inspection report, produced in November 2015, states that a new concrete wall and concrete columns were installed without authorization. Furthermore, the inspector was advised that the owners need to install 16 new pillars under the foundations to support the structure of the historic building.

In December 2015, the same building inspector wrote that he and an architect had inspected the foundation pillars and numerous cracks. He noted that the construction crew had erected support beams on the east facade. Shortly thereafter, the structural engineering firm submitted its report recommending the dismantling of the east facade, a solution still under consideration as of March 2016.

On April 14, 2016, The Montreal Gazette revealed that the Ville-Marie borough had finally granted a permit authorizing the dismantling and reconstruction of the east façade. This operation lasted eight months, from April to November 2016. On this section of the façade, the structure, originally composed of red bricks, was replaced with concrete blocks. To conceal the reinforced concrete structure supporting the house, rusticated stone was added to the north portion of the east façade.

On May 3, 2016, The Montreal Gazette revealed that Quebec's Ministry of Culture and Communications had been aware for over 15 years of the potential structural problems with the historic building should a skyscraper be built nearby, according to documents obtained through access to information legislation. Furthermore, these same documents revealed that it took ministry officials three weeks to follow up on a citizen's complaint about the destruction of historic architectural elements of the building.

Furthermore, the newspaper reveals that it is not only the facade that must be dismantled, but also, inside the residence, the parquet floors, paneling and even the coffered ceilings, which have also "suffered significant damage".

Structural problems: dismantling and reassembly of the facade

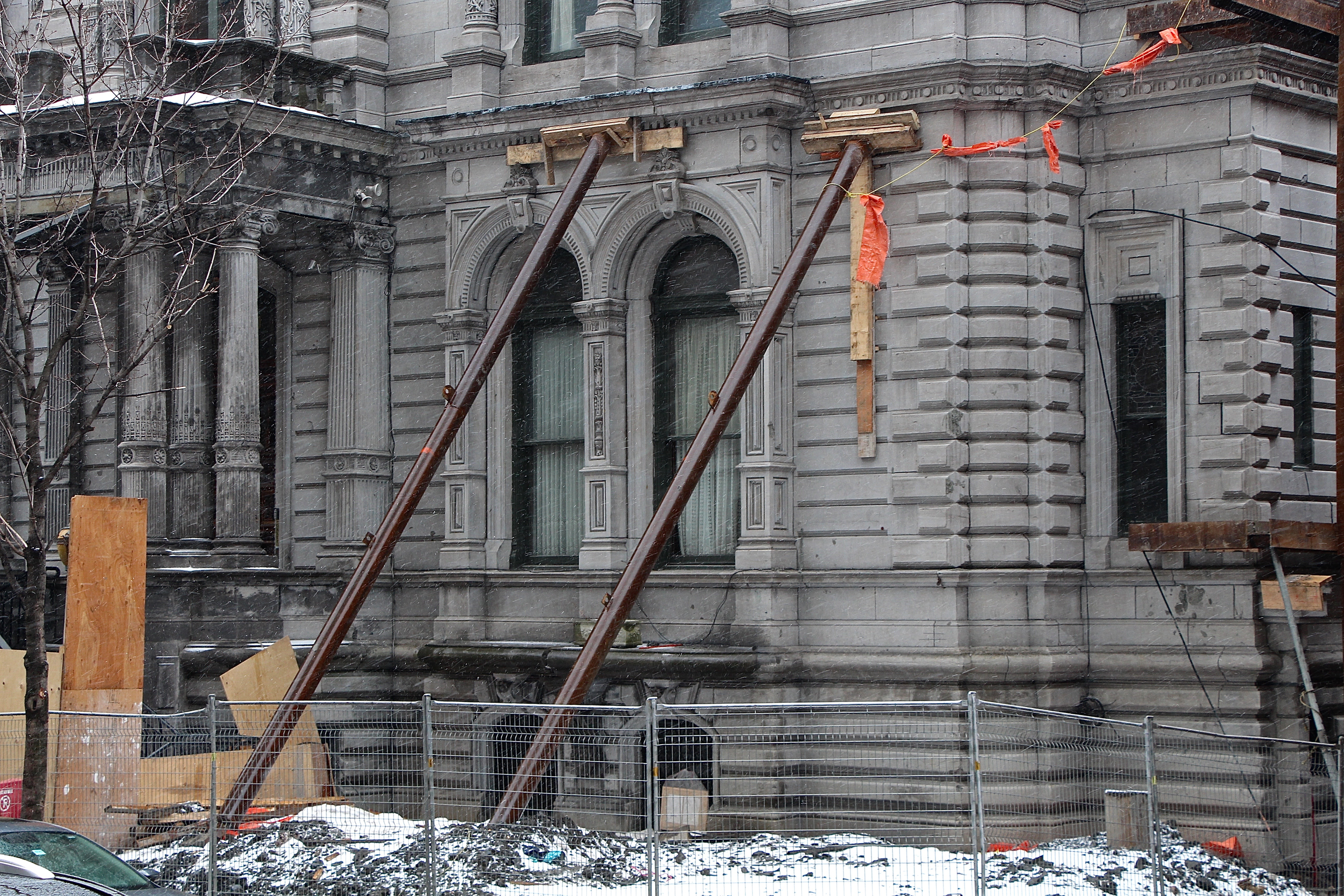
Support beams (January 2016)

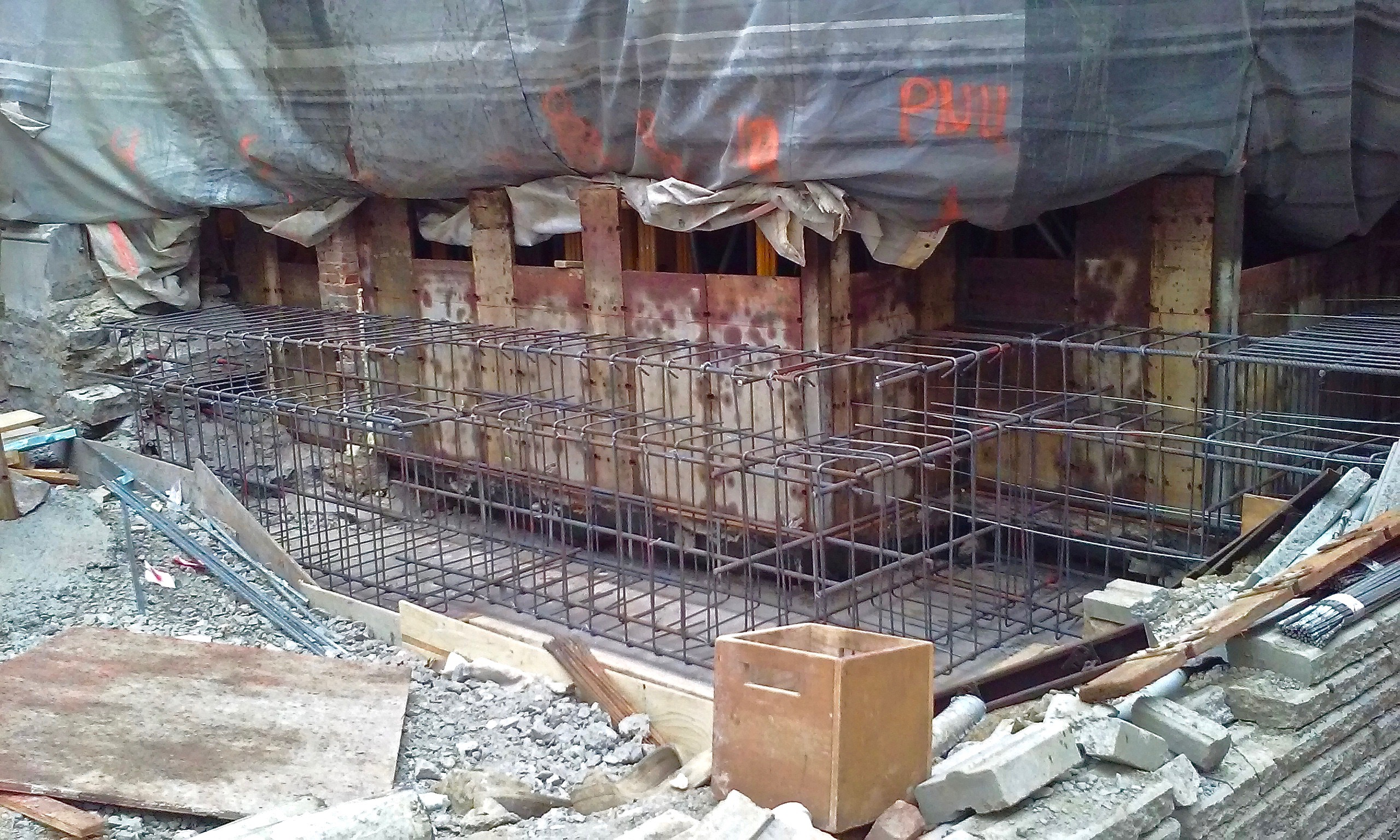
Reinforced concrete structure under construction (July 2016)

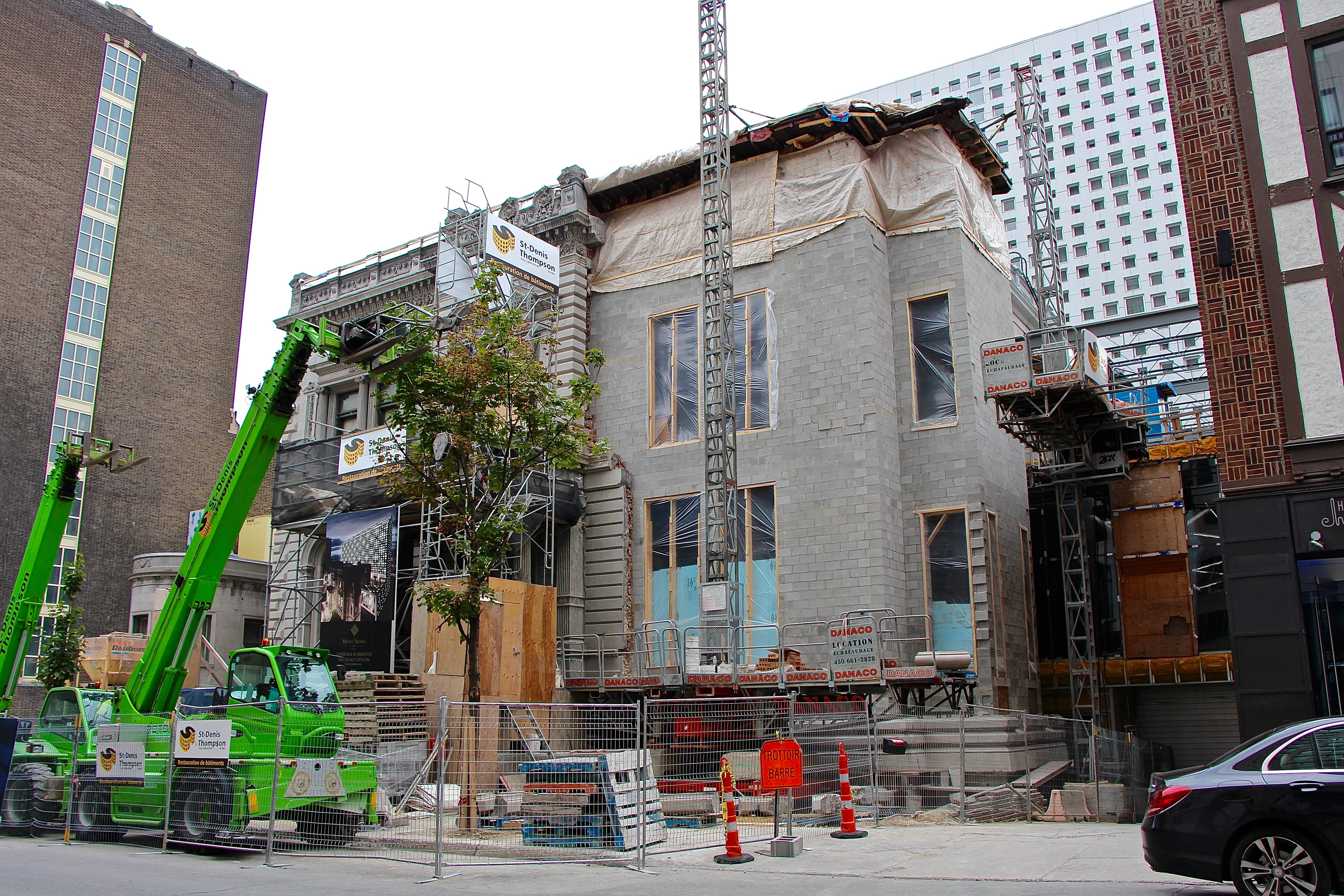
New structure made of concrete blocks (August 2016)

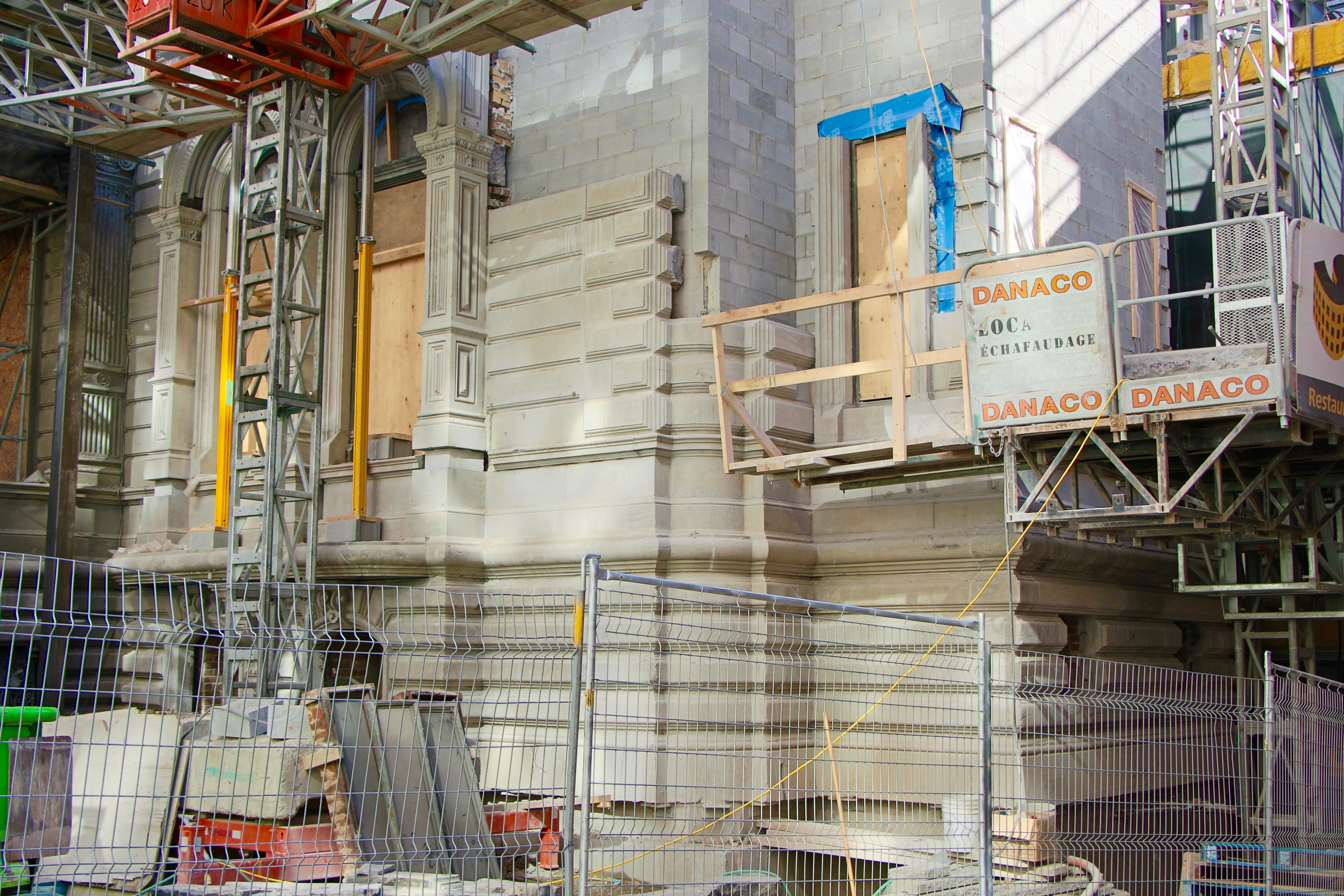
Reassembly of the facade (September 2016)

On May 1, 2017, the Mount Stephen Hotel, partly occupying the George Stephen House, officially opened to the public.

== Architecture ==
The grounds of the George Stephen house cover approximately 2,206 square meters. They are bordered by a wrought-iron fence to the north-east, the Drummond Medical Building to the south-east, Tudor Revival commercial buildings to the north-west (1448 Drummond Street/1230 De Maisonneuve Boulevard West), and a parking lot to the south-west.

Originally, this residence was part of an estate that included the house, a greenhouse, stables, and a garden.

=== Exterior ===
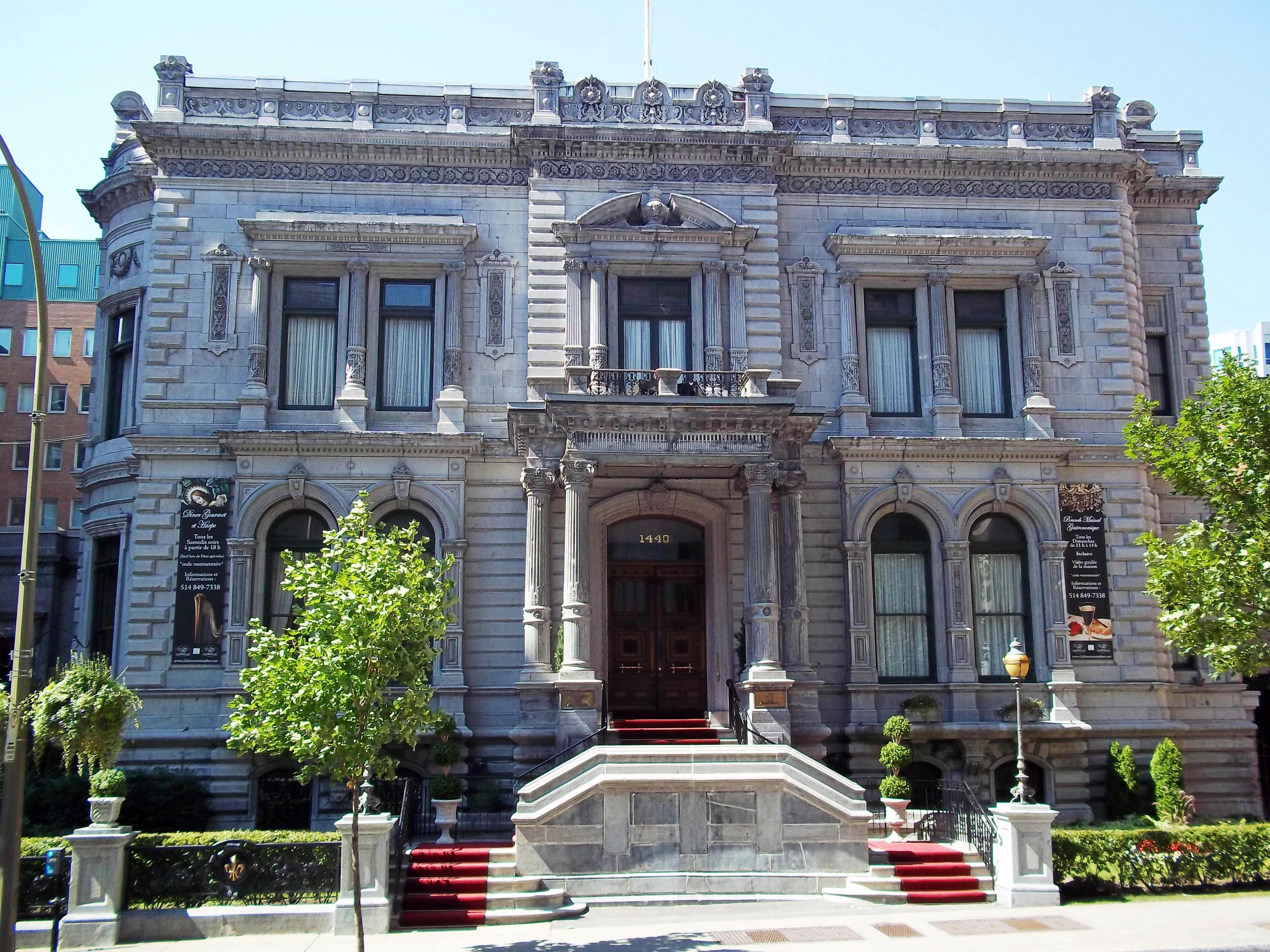
George Stephen House (2011)

Designed by architect William Tutin Thomas, the George Stephen House is built in a combination of architectural styles characteristic of Victorian architecture. It thus brings together the styles of the Italian Renaissance, Italian Baroque and 17th century English Baroque. (Note: Rémillard 1986, p. 108)

The residence consists of a four-story rectangular main building, including a basement and an attic level. The masonry, including the sculpted decoration, was executed by the firm of J. H. Hutchison. The front façade, constructed of grey Montreal limestone, features a central projection that divides the sculpted decoration in two, each side mirroring the other. This façade is primarily characterized by a double-flight staircase (flanked by two lampposts) that meets at the foot of the third flight, which leads to the main floor. This staircase, rebuilt in 1937 on new foundations, no longer includes the small balcony at the junction of the first two flights, which was supported by three corbels decorated with flowers. The staircase leads to the grand entrance, framed by a porch with columns and pilasters. The Ionic capitals of these columns are crowned with a molded abacus supported by four small scrolls and featuring a flower at its center. Their chines are adorned with egg-and-dart motifs, pearls, and pirouettes. The volutes, decorated with leaves, are tied together with garlands.

The double front door, thirteen centimeters thick, is made of Cuban mahogany and its handles are plated with twenty-two-carat gold. It is surmounted by a glazed transom and a segmental arch. This arch, with its keystone represented by a blank escutcheon, is adorned with an interlaced molding. (Note: Dictionnaire Larousse 1996, p. 726)

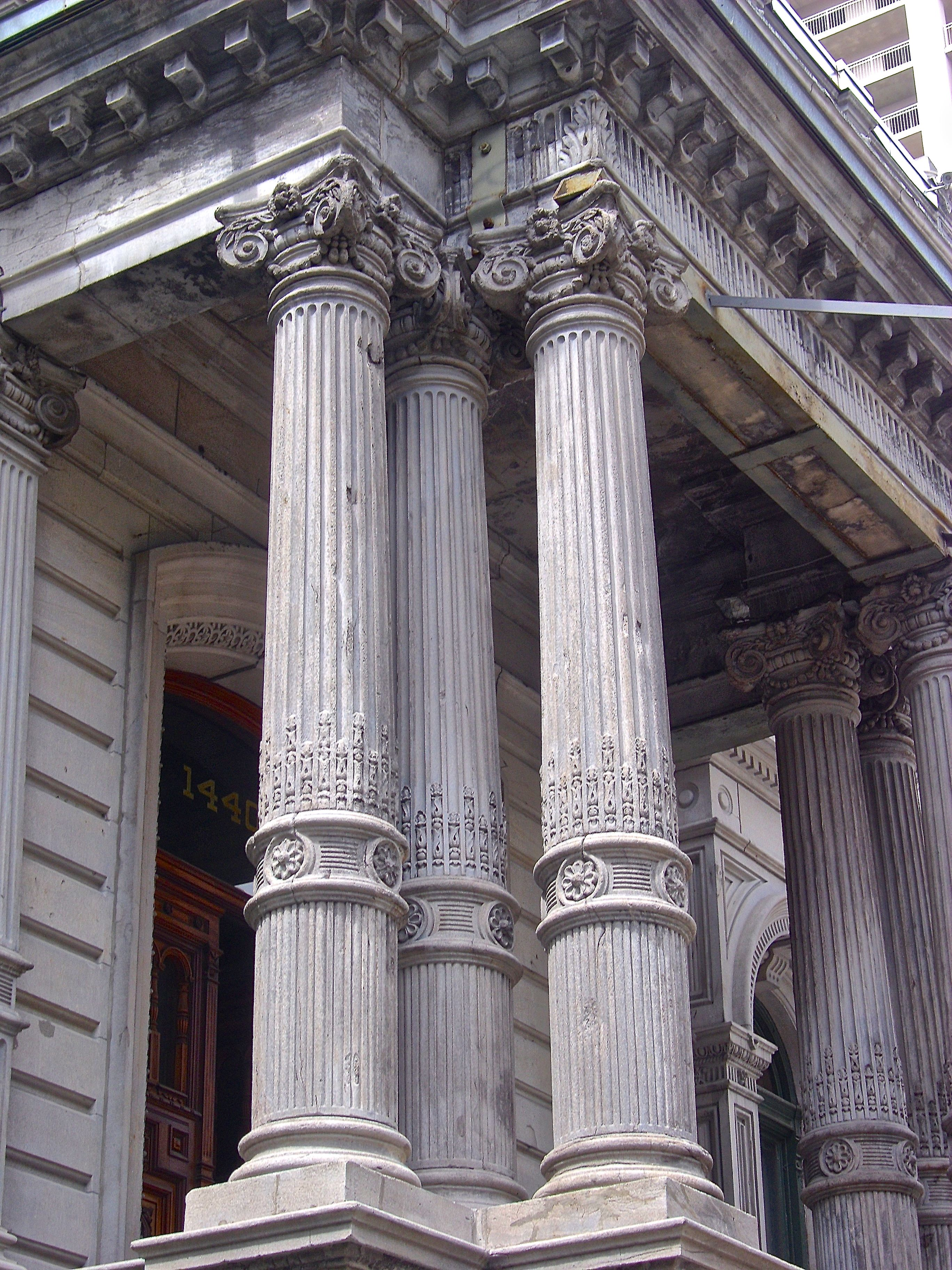
Detail of columns (2013)

The porch is surmounted by a balcony enclosed by a wrought-iron balustrade supported by stone pillars. The French window on the second floor, providing access to the balcony, is double-leaf and extended by a rectangular transom. On either side of this French window are successive pairs of columns and then pilasters in the Ionic order. Their capitals are crowned with a molded abacus supported by four small scrolls and featuring an acanthus leaf at its center. Their chines are adorned with egg-and-dart molding, pearls, and pirouettes. The volutes, embellished with acanthus leaves, are decorated with a cascade of grape or berry bunches. The base of the columns and pilasters appears to be decorated with mistletoe branches. These columns support an architrave surmounted by a frieze dominated by a molding of egg-and-dart motifs which supports a pediment with a low arch interrupted or broken in its center and where there is an urn. (Note: Pinard 1987, p. 181)

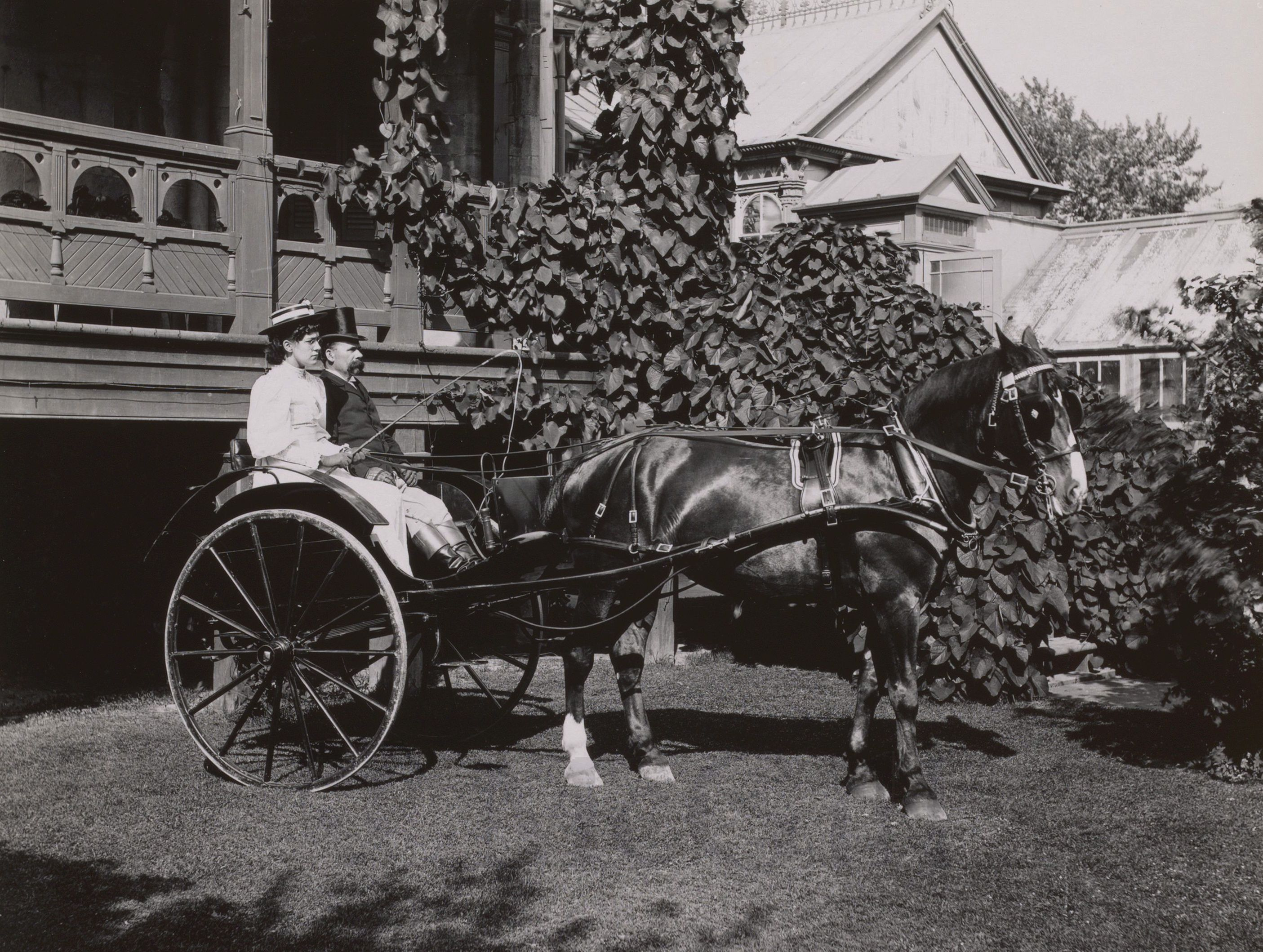
Detail of the balcony (on the left)

The basement, main floor, and second-floor windows on the facade are paired and symmetrically arranged on either side of the projection. In the basement, the windows are set into the chamfered stone plinth. These windows are protected by wrought-iron grilles. They are also separated from the first-floor windows by a shelf supported by three irregularly sized brackets, where flowerpots or plants were once placed and protected by a wrought-iron railing. (Note: Armstrong 1959, p. 22)

On the main floor, the windows are framed by Roman Doric pilasters adorned with sculpted elements from the Italian Renaissance style. These pilasters support semicircular arches that follow the shape of the windows and feature a false keystone at their center. These arches support a frieze surmounted by a modillion cornice, which in turn supports the Ionic columns that frame the second-floor windows. On the second floor, the columns flanking the windows display the same decoration as those surrounding the French doors leading to the balcony. They support a frieze surmounted by a modillion cornice. However, unlike those on the first floor, they frame windows extended by rectangular transoms.

The front façade features a chamfered stone wall at the basement and main floor levels, while the second floor has a dressed stone wall. The front façade wall is further emphasized by chamfered stone quoins on the main floor and second floor. The façade is crowned by a floral frieze and then by a series of modillion cornices supporting a stone parapet adorned with decorative elements, which conceals the flat roof.

As for the south-east wall, it features a circular oriel window extending the full height of the residence. A turret is also visible to the southwest of the wall. (Note: Pinard 1987, p. 182) This turret and the oriel window together frame a central section punctuated by a pair of rectangular windows topped with transoms. This façade is much less ornate than the front one. On the main floor, an opening provides access to the former greenhouse, which was completely walled up in 1927. A straight staircase was also installed that same year, providing direct access to the south wing from Drummond Street. A section of the front fence no longer exists to allow access.

The northwest and southwest elevations are completely devoid of ornamentation. However, a two-story porch once stood at the rear, on the west wall. Unlike the northwest, southwest, and northeast facades, the corbelled cornice on the west side has no parapet. The windows were originally covered with shutters during the summer.

Located in front of the building and bordering Drummond Street, the wrought iron fence is decorated with dragons, various flowers and a fleur-de-lis. It is supported by stone pillars.

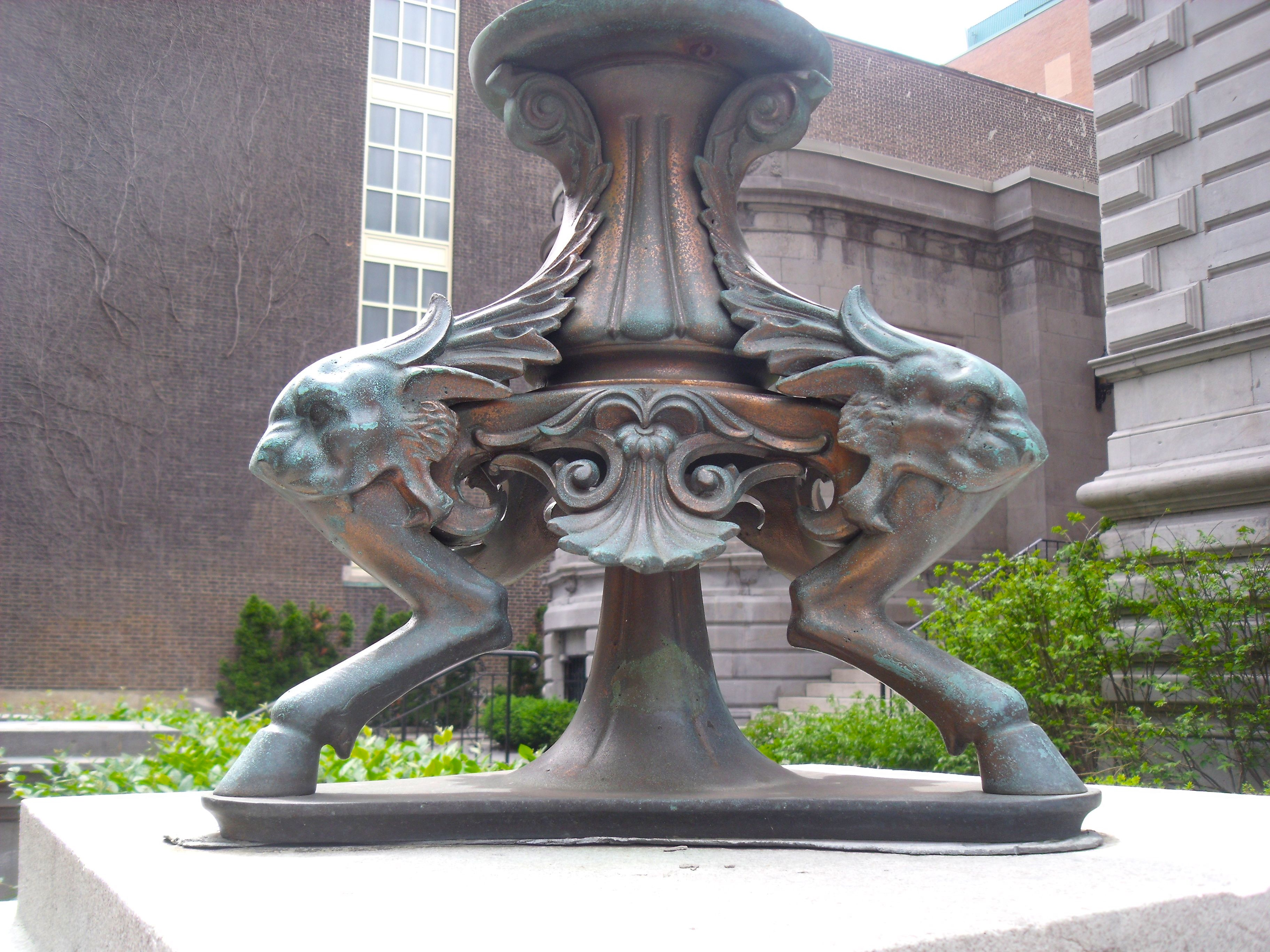
Detail of a lamppost (2013)

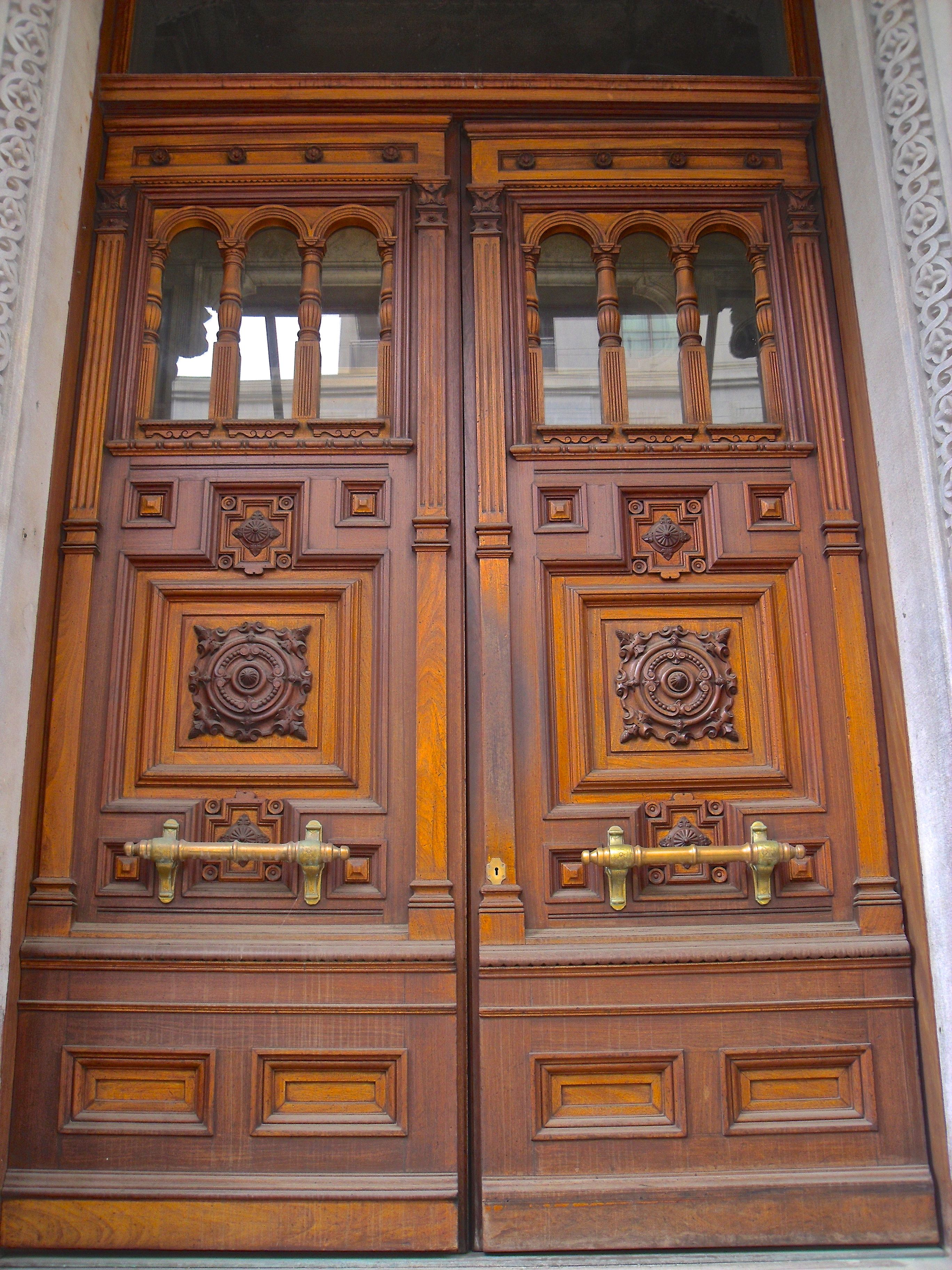
Central double-leaf door in Cuban mahogany (2013)

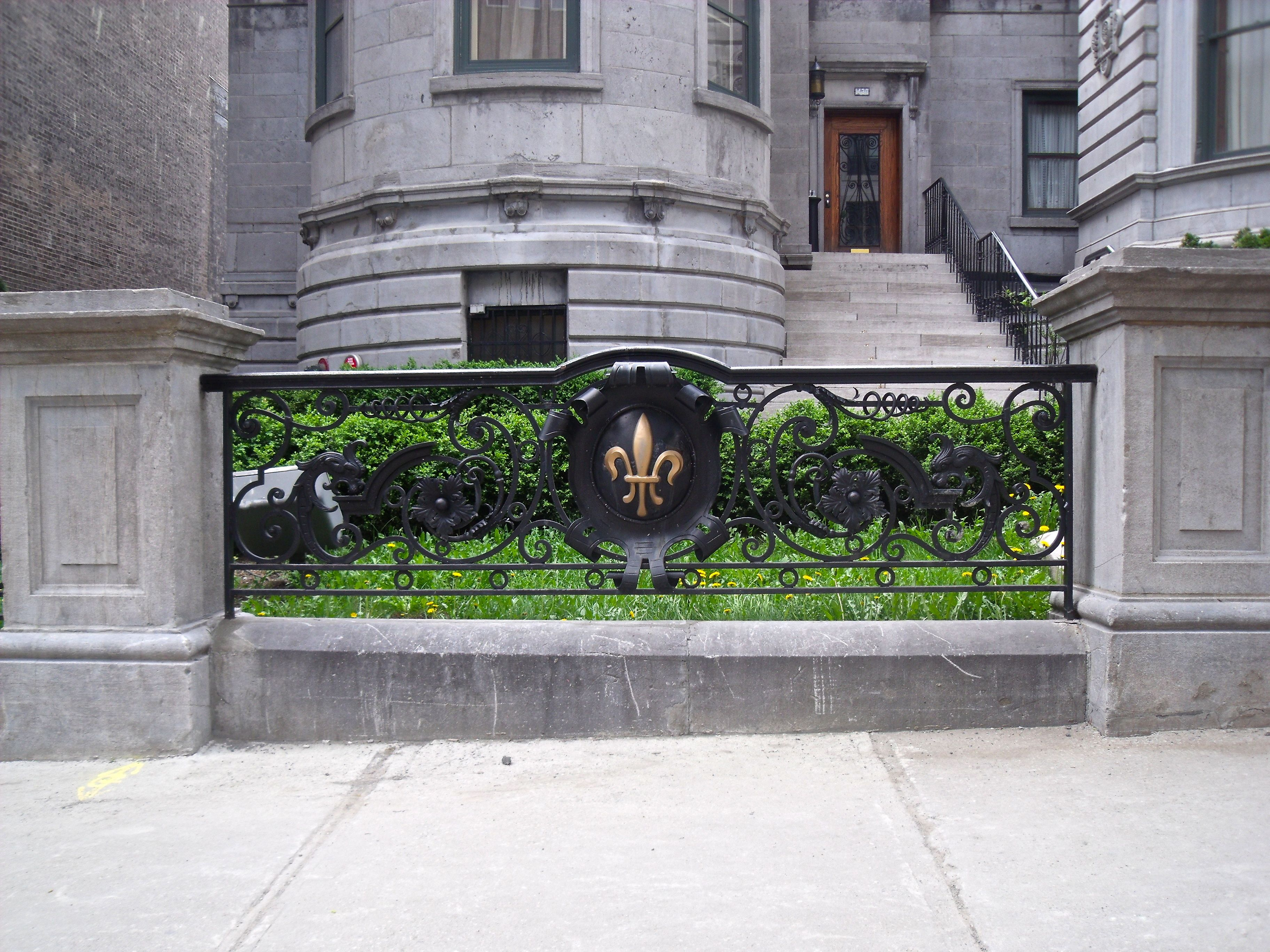
Wrought iron fence (2013)

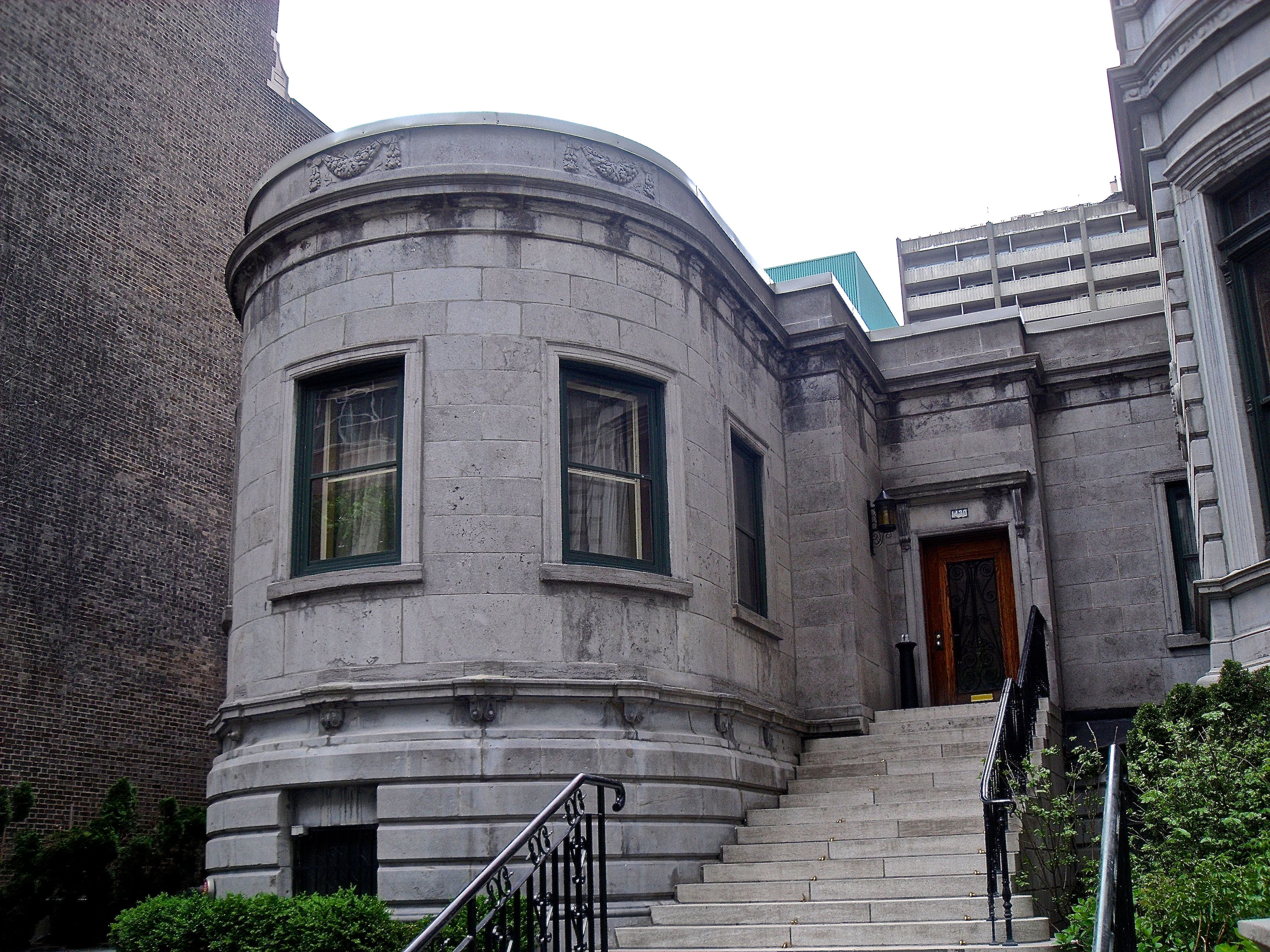
The club's former private ladies' lounge, previously the greenhouse (2013)

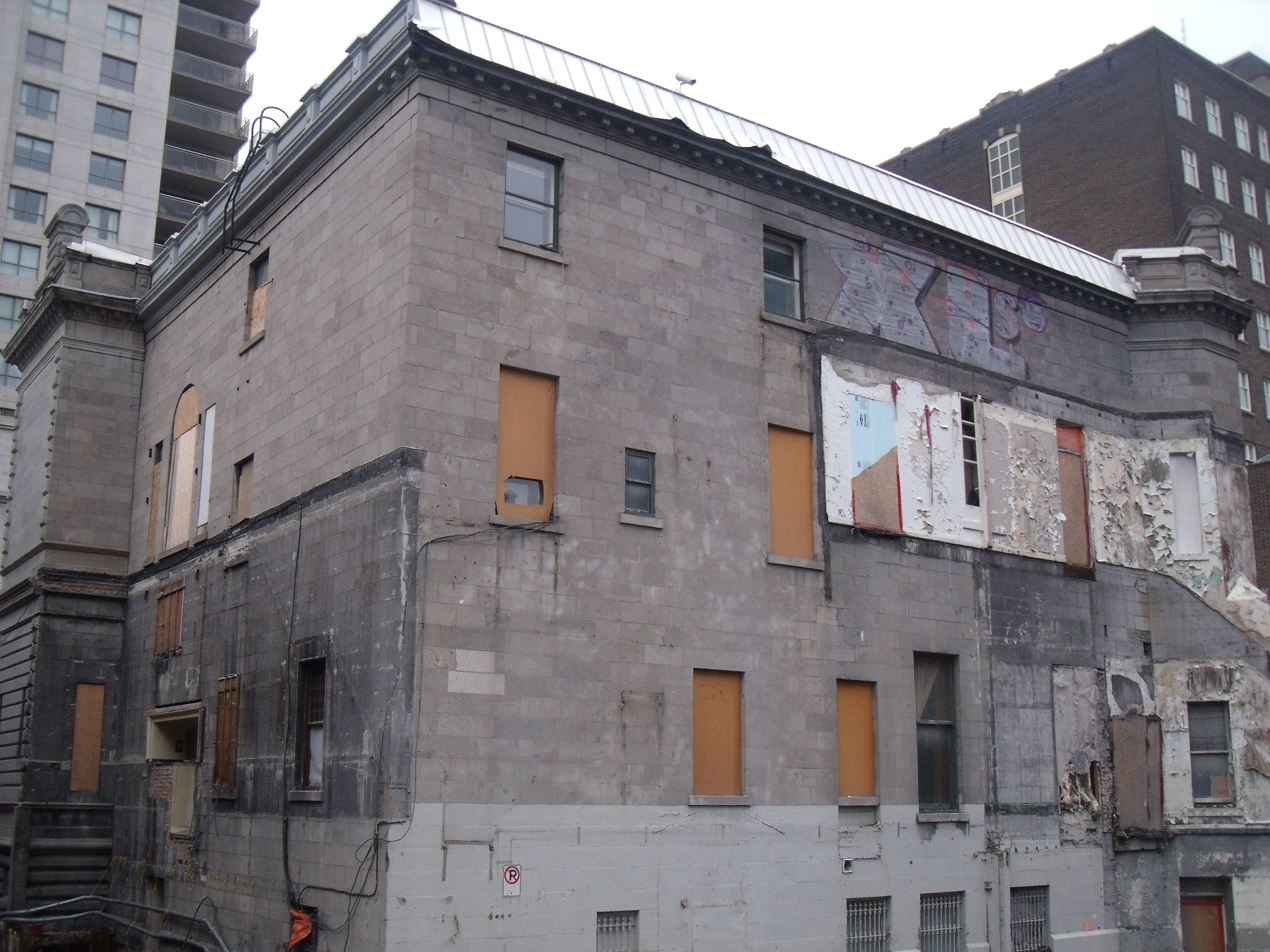
The northwest (left) and southwest (right) walls (2013)

Missing item	Description	Date of disappearance	Illustration
Balcony	The main staircase had, at the junction of the first two flights, a balcony supported by three consoles decorated with flowers.	Circa 1937	
Wrough-iron railings	The shelves beneath the windows of the main floor of the front facade featured wrought iron railings.	After 1985	

=== Interior ===
The interior of the residence occupies an area of 2,555 m2. The architect William Tutin Thomas conceived this residence as a total work of art, as he designed all the decorations as well as almost all of the furniture in the house which he had custom-built.

The woodwork
The team of carpenter and joiner Archibald McIntyre executed all the interior woodwork, based on the designs of architect William Tutin Thomas. However, little information exists to identify the artisans who contributed to the ornamental wood carvings incorporated into the building. The types of wood used for the carved decoration include Cuban mahogany, Burley oak, maple, stiff pine, English and French walnut, cherry wood, and Ceylon satinwood. The house's floors are oak decorated with walnut inlays. (Note: Pinard 1987, p. 183)

The furniture
To furnish the residence, architect William Tutin Thomas commissioned the Toronto-based cabinetmaking and interior design firm Jacques & Hay, which crafted nearly all the interior furniture according to the architect's designs. Several types of wood were used, including rosewood, Canadian black walnut, mahogany, satinwood, cherry, bird's eye figure wood, and oak.

Cabinetmaker James Thomson also created some furniture for the residence.

In 1884, the New York firm Decker Brothers built the grand piano for the main living room, also designed by architect William Tutin Thomas.

Robert Mitchell & Co. manufactured and installed all the wall sconces, ceiling lights, and radiator grilles, all of which were plated with 22-karat gold. The bronze chandelier in the northwest bedroom upstairs is a later addition. It was presented to the Mount Stephen Club by Stephen Vaughan, the American vice-consul in Berlin during World War II. (Note: Mount Stephen Club, Montreal 1967, p. 15)

No known source mentions the artisans of the Mexican onyx or Italian/Vienna marble pieces, including the fireplace mantels. It is possible, however, that some of them came from the workshops of Robert Forsyth in Montreal. As for the fireplace mantel in the main living room, made entirely of Mexican onyx, some sources from the Mount Stephen Club claim it was exhibited at the 1893 World's Columbian Exposition in Chicago, (Note: Mount Stephen Club, Montreal 1967, p. 13) but since it was already installed in the main living room in 1884, this assertion is unlikely. (Note: Wm. Notman & Son, « Living room, Mrs. George Stephen's house, Montreal, QC, 1884 », Gelatin silver glass plate negative , 1884, McCord-Stewart Museum, no. II-73825, Online) If a similar model from the same manufacturer was exhibited at this exposition, it could have been made by S. Kabler & Co. of New York, R. G. Leding of Philadelphia, or the Eureka Onyx Company of Indianapolis, among others. (Note: Moses P. Handy, Chicago 1893, p. 242) (Note: Moses P. Handy, Chicago 1893, p. 243)

Stained-glass windows
The house possesses a collection of stained glass windows from "Gibbs of London" (possibly Walter Gibbs & Sons) and Edmundson & Son of Manchester, based on designs by the artist Henry Holiday. These windows were ordered, adapted, and installed by the stained-glass artist John C. Spence of Montreal, who was given free rein in their creation, although collaboration with the architect and George Stephen is likely regarding the themes.

In the transoms of the windows in the main drawing room are allegorical figures representing poetry, music, embroidery, and literature by "Gibbs of London". In the dining room, the stained glass depicts fish, meat, poultry, fruit, and birds. In the conservatory, the stained glass features allegorical figures representing Pomona (fruit), Flora (flowers), and Ceres (grain). The transom window in the hallway represents domestic industry. In the stairwell, Shakespearean figures and scenes are depicted by Edmundson & Son of Manchester. To the left of the composition are two Shakespearean scenes from the plays Henry IV and Henry V. To the right are two Shakespearean scenes from the plays Twelfth Night and The Taming of the Shrew. In the center are Shakespearean scenes from the play As You Like It. The stained-glass windows in the stairwell ceiling illustrate the cardinal directions and the signs of the zodiac. In the double doors and their side panels, which separate the vestibule from the entrance hall, the stained-glass windows depict allegorical figures representing the four seasons, crowned by the motto "True friendship's laws are by this rule exprest, Welcome the coming, speed the parting guest" from Homer's Odyssey. This motto is surmounted by the monogram of George Stephen. In the waiting room and private study, the two stained-glass windows depict the muses of music and poetry, as well as comedy and tragedy. Upstairs, the stained-glass windows in the transoms illustrate allegorical figures representing night, dawn, and each of the four seasons.

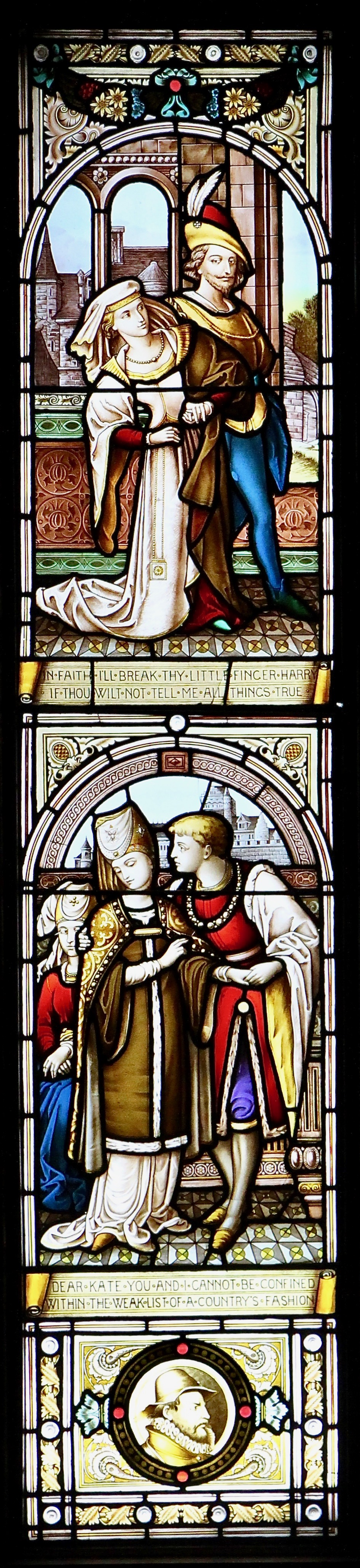
Stained-glass windows depicting two Shakespearean scenes from the plays Henry IV and Henry V by Edmundson & Son of Manchester

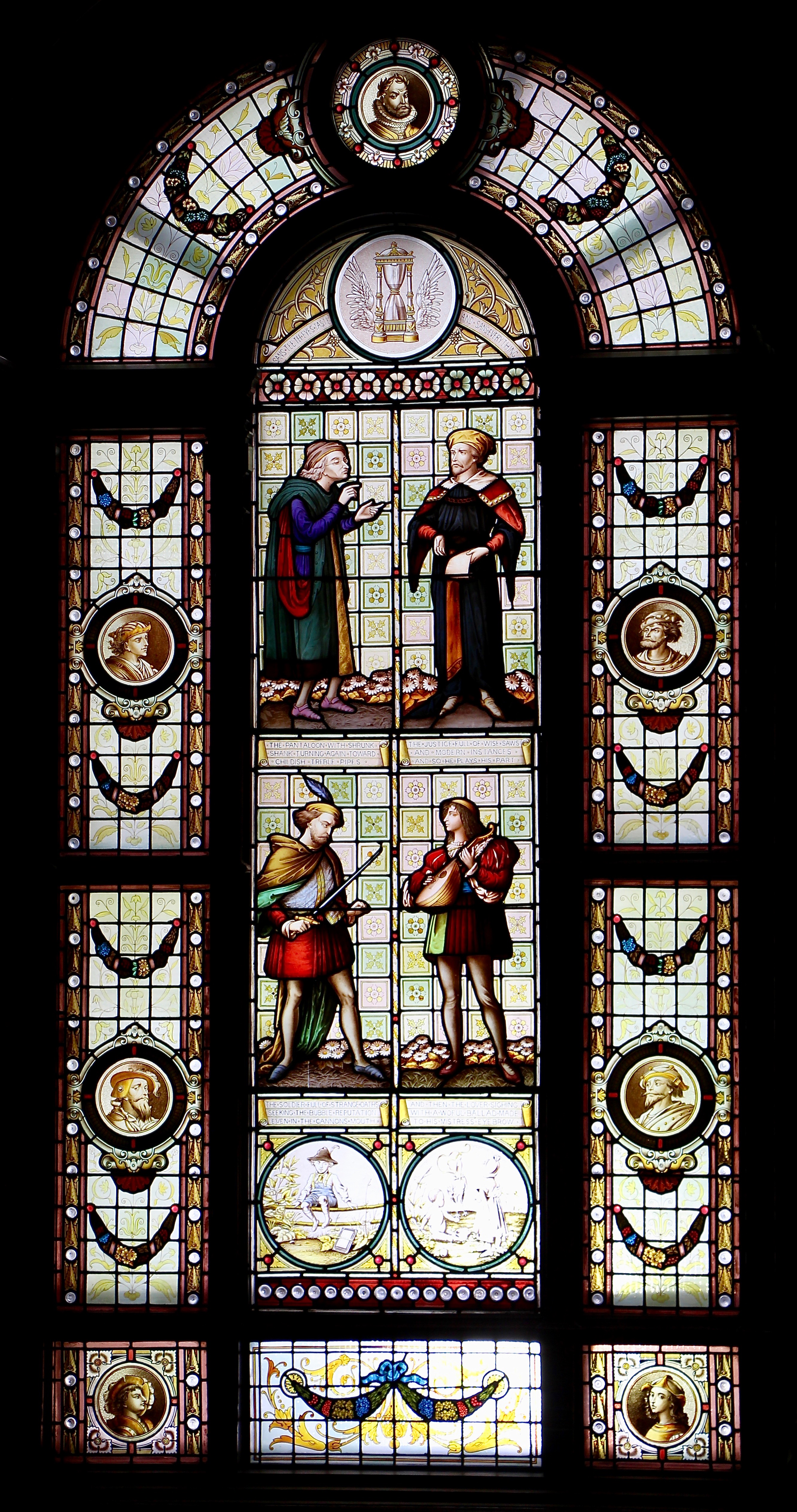
Stained-glass windows depicting Shakespearean scenes from the play As You Like It by Edmundson & Son of Manchester

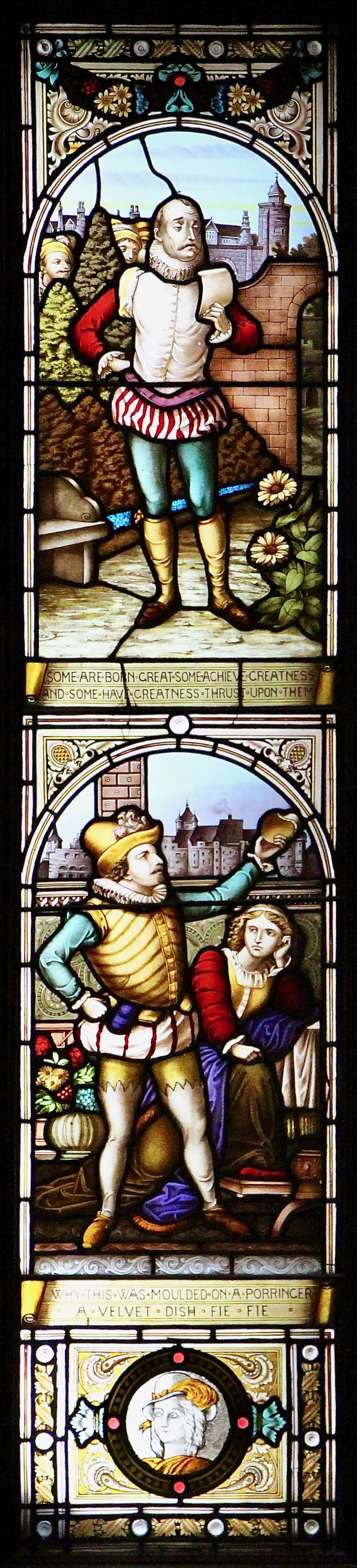
Stained-glass windows depicting two Shakespearean scenes from the plays Twelfth Night and The Taming of the Shrew by Edmundson & Son of Manchester

Missing item	Description	Date of disappearance	Illustration
Stained glass windows in the transoms of the windows in the waiting room and private study on the main floor	In the waiting room and private study, the two stained-glass windows above the transoms depict the muses of music and poetry, as well as comedy and tragedy.	Between 1967 and 1980 (Note: Photograph: Mount Stephen Club. Montreal City Archives. File : D03B-0233 à D03B-0243 : Rue Guy, rue Drummond, rue Bishop. - Avril 1980. Cote: VM097-Y-02-D003B-0236)	
Stained glass window in the transom of one of the windows in the northwest room	In the northwest room, the transom of the alcove window overlooking the front facade once contained a stained-glass window.	Before 1980	

Tapestries
In the stairwell, a series of paintings on raffia-woven canvases depicts, in the grotesque style, figures from Roman mythology, including Venus, Juno, and Minerva. It is possible that their theme was inspired by tapestries from the Gobelins Manufactory, based on designs by Claude Audran III, depicting the twelve months of the year and intended for the Château de Meudon. However, no known source mentions the artist of these tapestries or when they were installed. According to period photographs, these tapestries were installed between 1884 and 1927. (Note: Wm. Notman & Son, « Staircase, Mrs. George Stephen's house, Montreal, QC, 1884 », Gelatin silver glass plate negative, 1884, McCord-Stewart Museum, II-73823, Online) It is possible that they were installed between 1900 and 1906 by the Meighen family. Indeed, on one hand, they could be part of the alterations made by the Meighen family during this period: after Robert Meighen acquired the residence on October 4, 1900, he had the fence and sidewalk at the front of the property modified around 1903. Moreover, in 1906, Robert Meighen mentioned at a city hall committee meeting that he had "spent considerable sums to embellish the property." On the other hand, the use of raffia thread in the decorative arts seems to have been particularly popular at the very beginning of the 20th century. Finally, the grotesque style of these tapestries (drawn from French classicism and seemingly inspired by the style of Simon Vouet (Note: Vouet et Dorigny 1647)) contrasts with the rest of the interior decorations, which are in the Renaissance Revival style of the architect William Tutin Thomas.

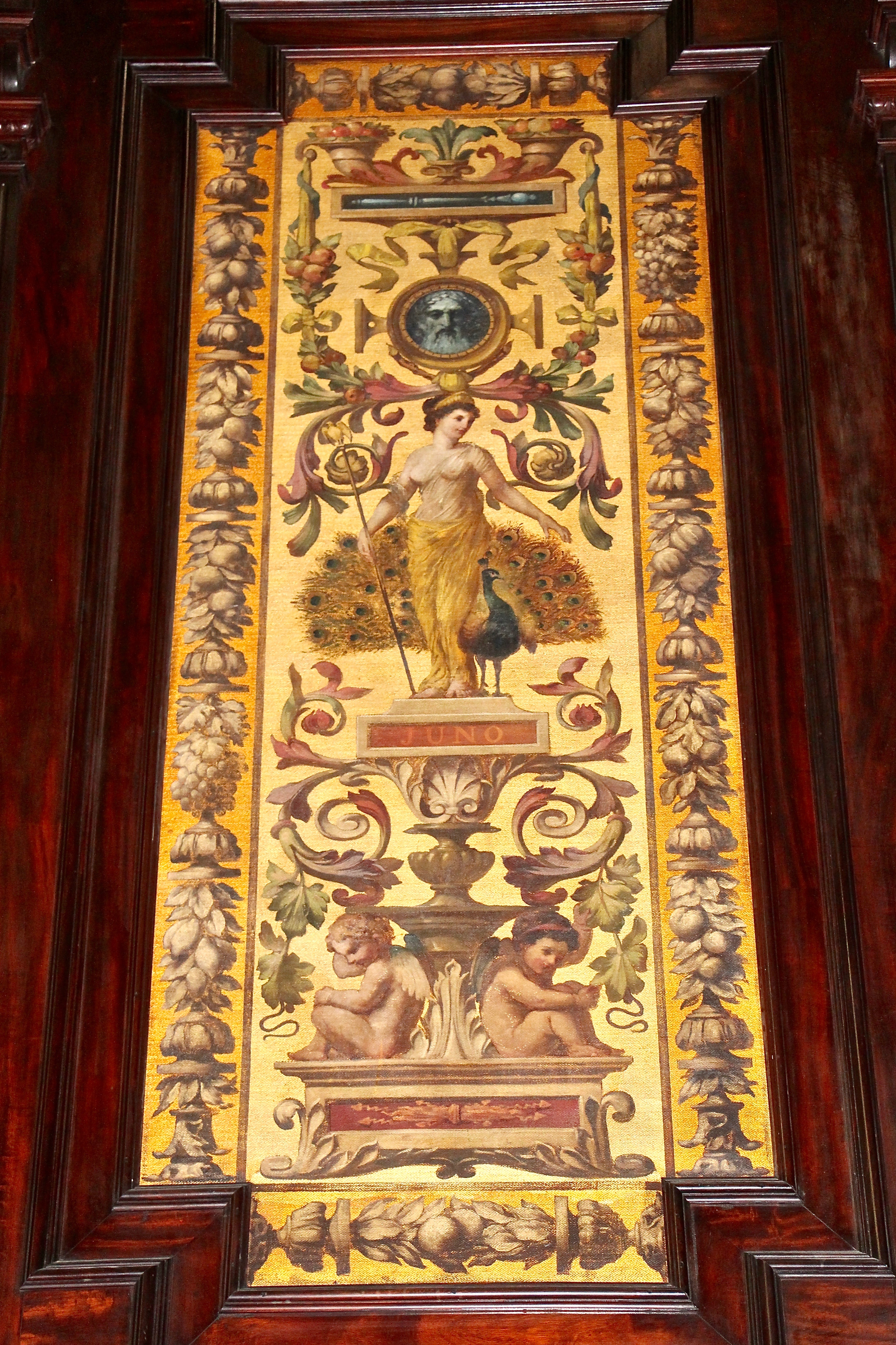
Tapestry depicting goddess Juno

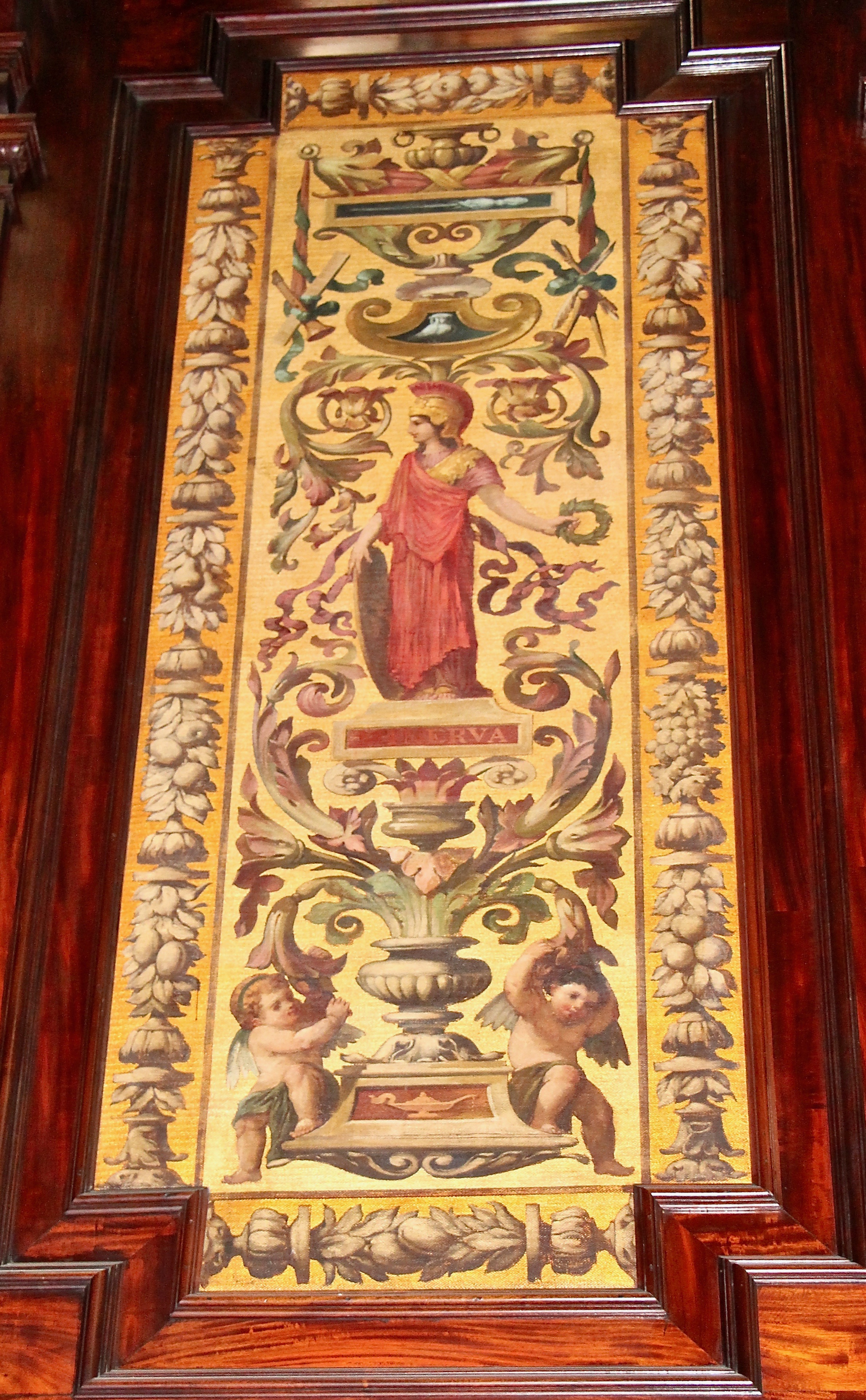
Tapestry depicting goddess Minerva

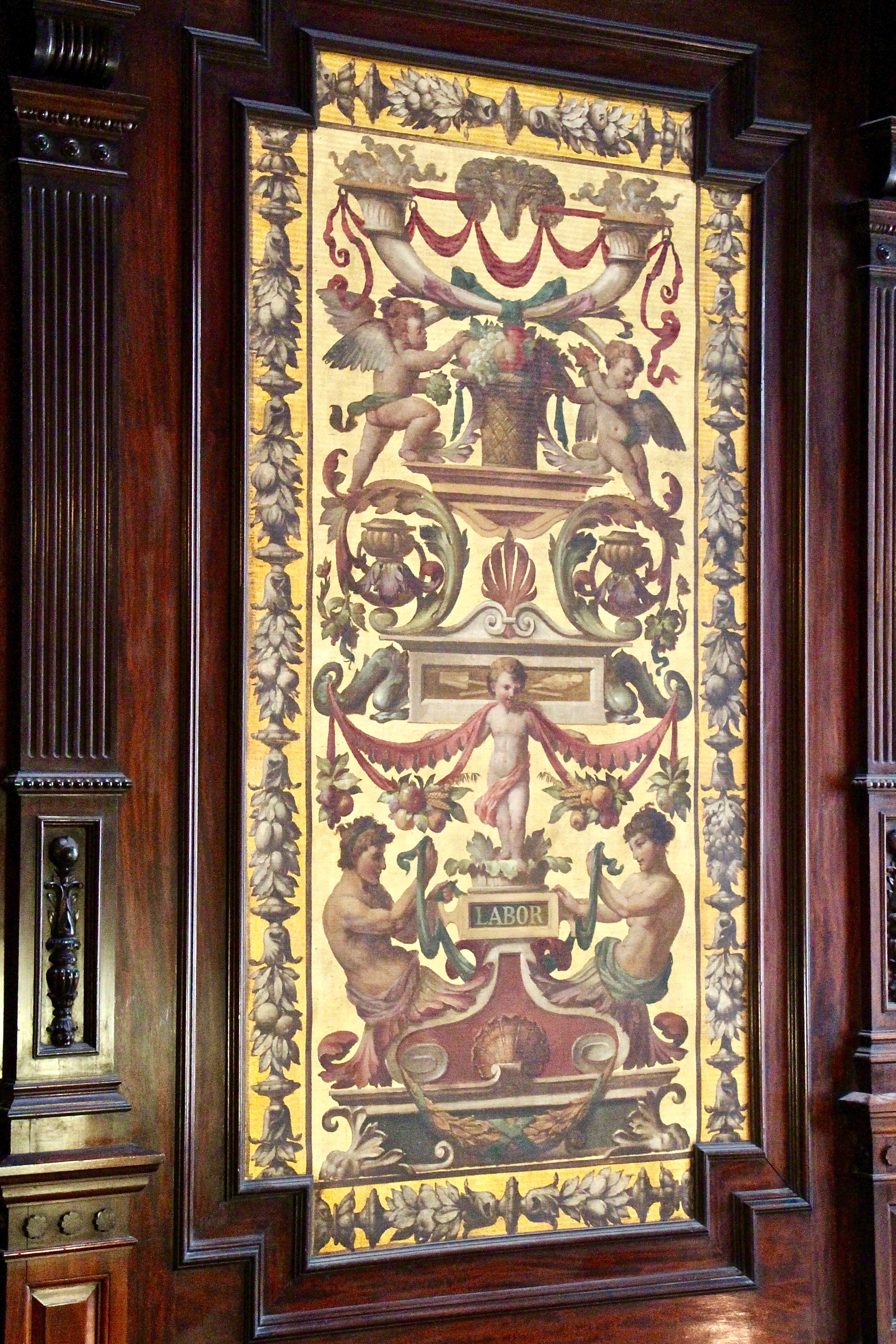
Tapestry depicting "Labor"

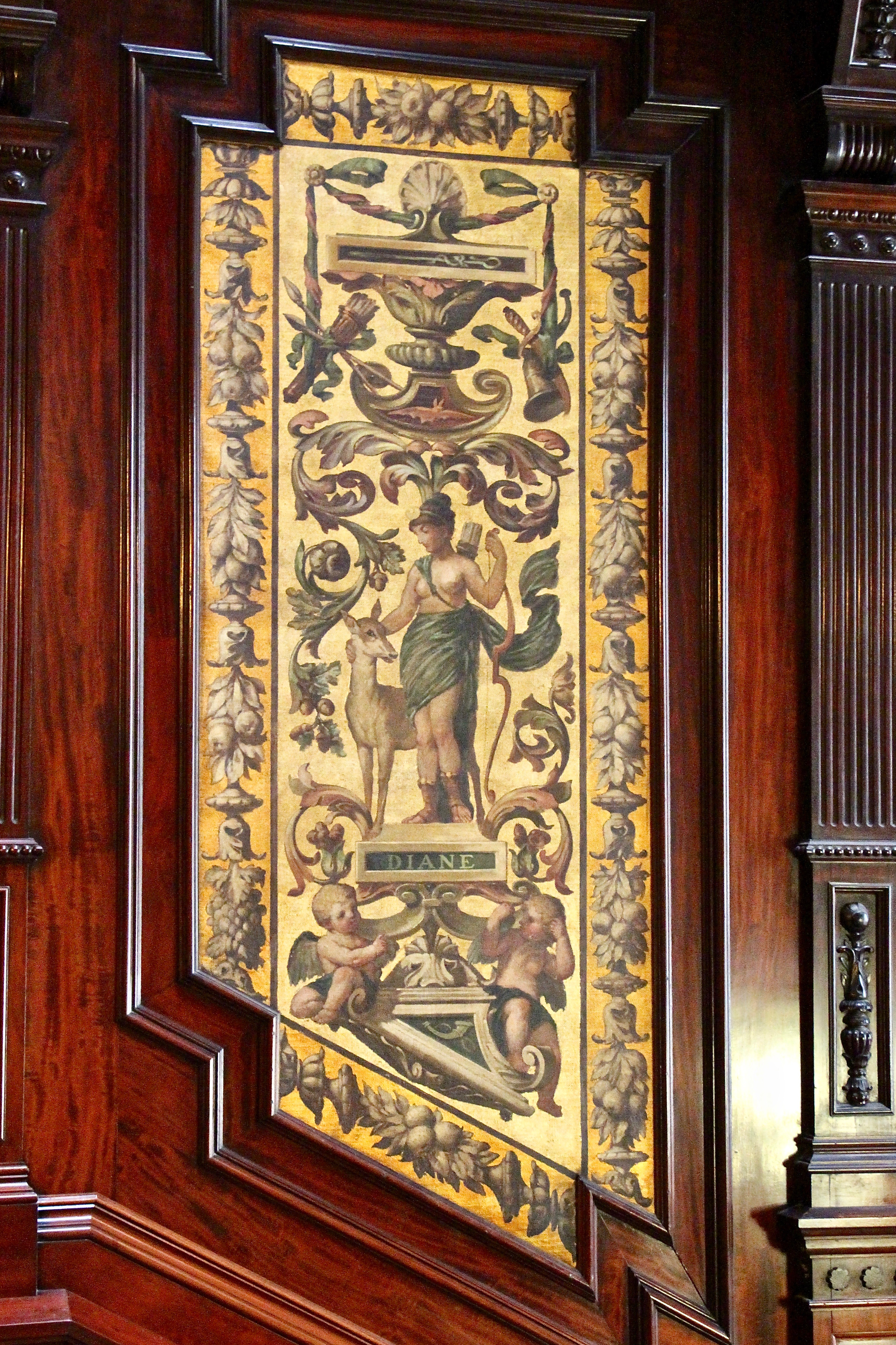
Tapestry depicting goddess Diana

Art collection
George Stephen and Robert Meighen exhibit at the residence their collection of paintings featuring works by Canadian and foreign artists such as Otto Reinhold Jacobi, Allan Aaron Edson, English portraitist John Hoppner and French landscape painters Adolphe Monticelli and Léon Augustin Lhermitte.

==== Basement ====
Originally, the basement included several rooms: a kitchen, a larder, a butter room, a scullery, a servant's hall, a laundry room, a wine cellar, various storage areas (including a coal room under the greenhouse), a bathroom, several servants' bedrooms, a stairwell, and a corridor. One room also housed the residence's heating system. (Note: Armstrong 1959, p. 41)

==== Ground floor ====
Originally, the main floor or ground floor included these rooms: a vestibule, an entrance hall, a monumental staircase, a private study or library, an antechamber or waiting Room, a breakfast room, a dining room, a drawing room and a greenhouse containing, among other things, a fountain.

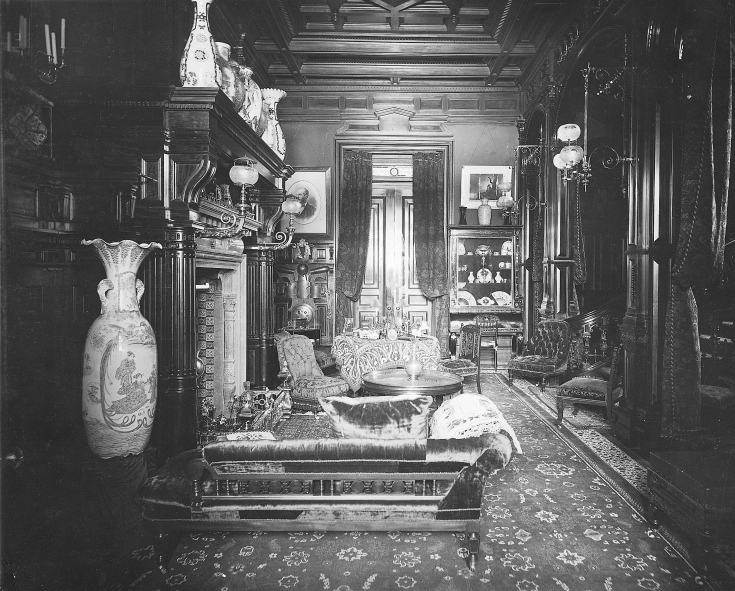
Entrance hall (1884)

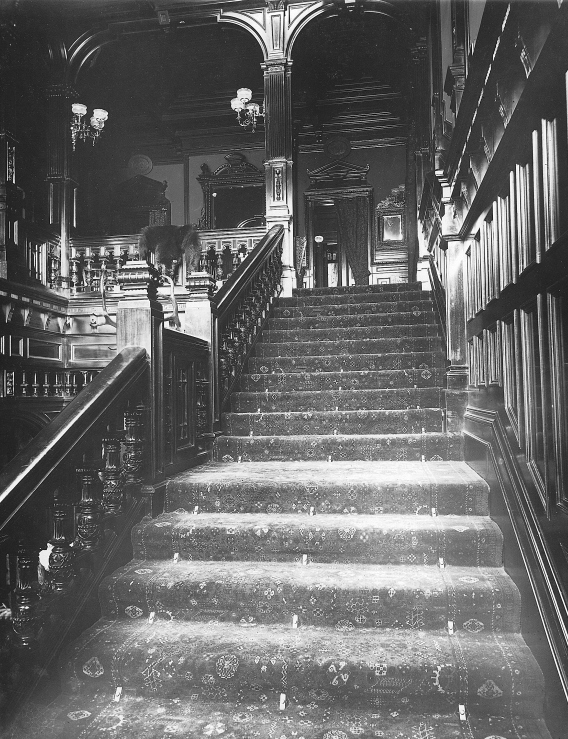
Staircase (1884)

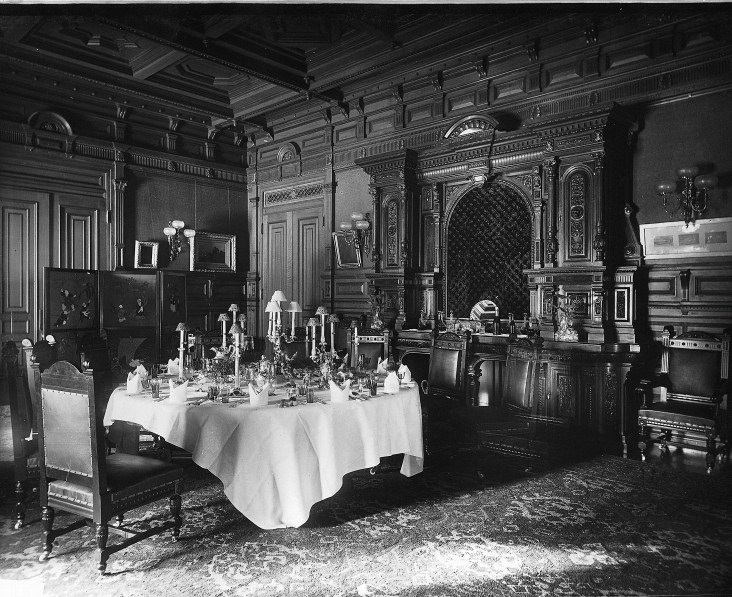
Dining room (1884)

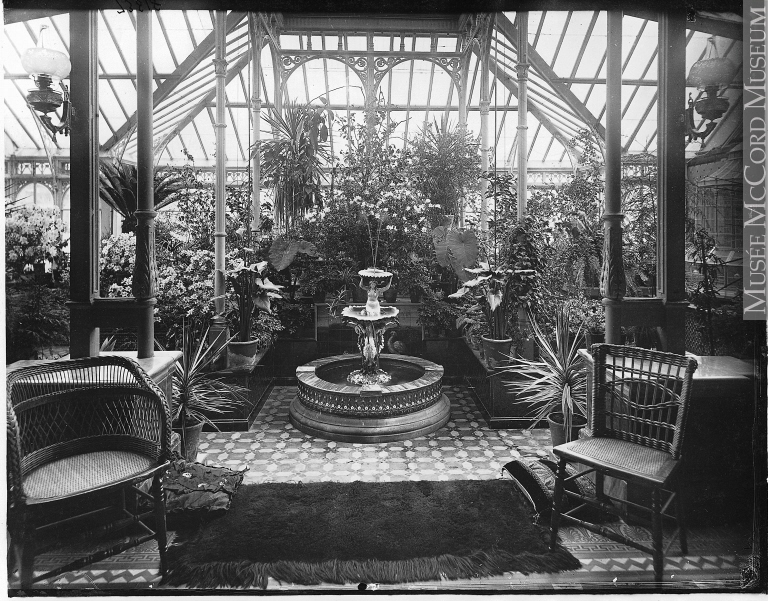
Conservatory (1884)

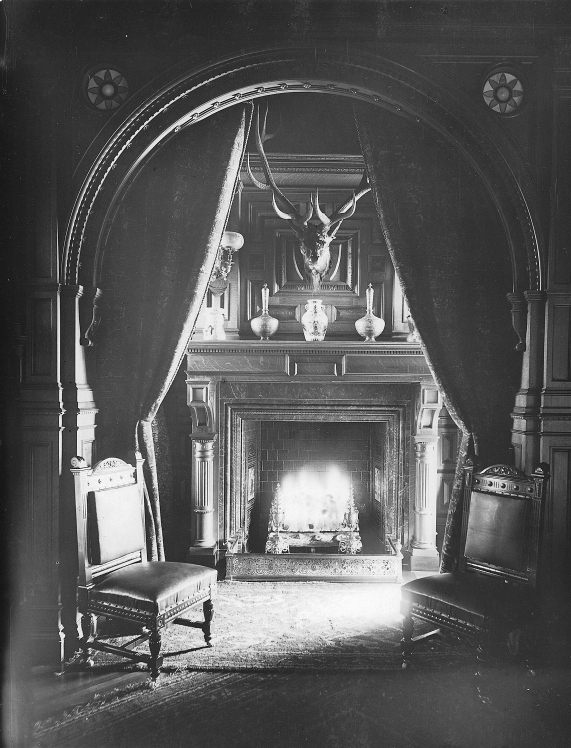
Dining room's fire mantel (1884)

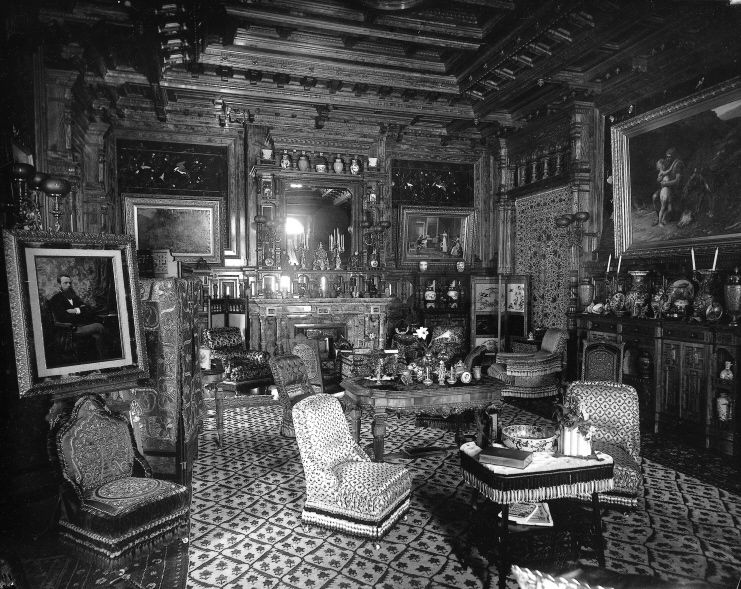
Drawing room (1884)

==== First floor ====
Originally, the main floor or ground floor included these rooms: a monumental staircase, a service staircase leading to the attic, a corridor, a master bedroom, two dressing rooms adjacent to the master bedroom, a sitting room, a guest room, a dressing room adjacent to the guest room, a corridor leading to the stairwell and a possible bathroom.

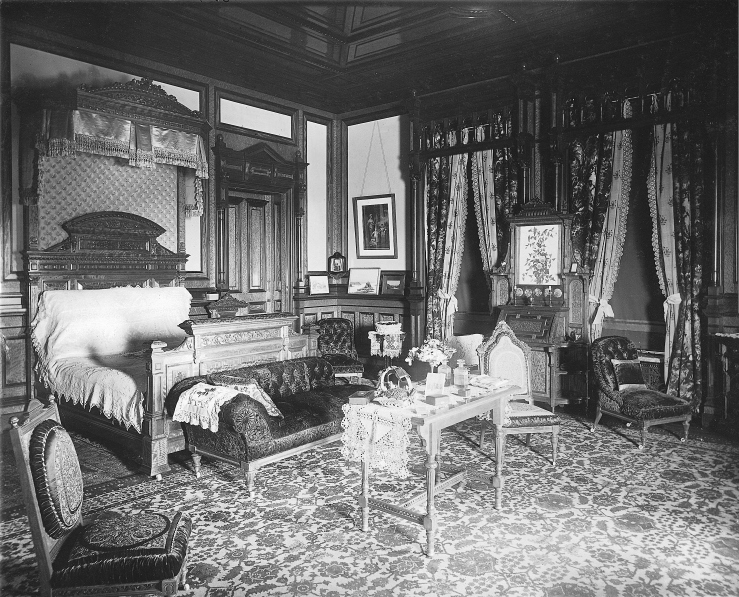
Master bedroom (1884)

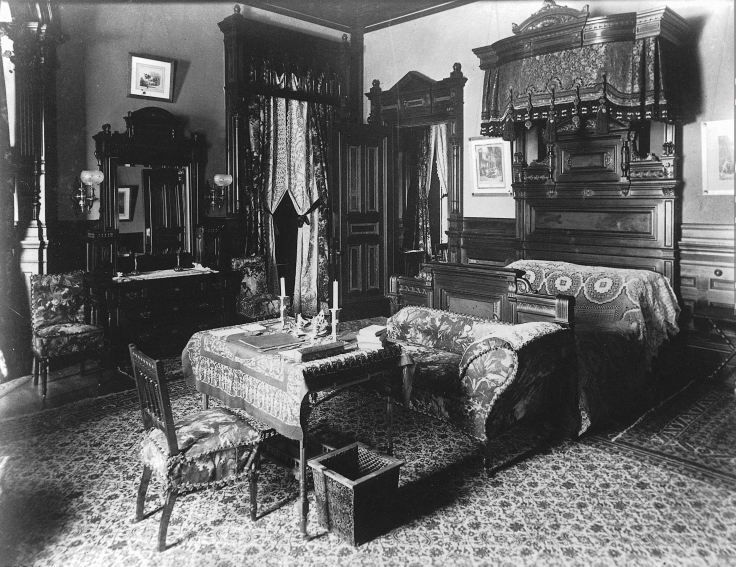
Guest's suite (1884)

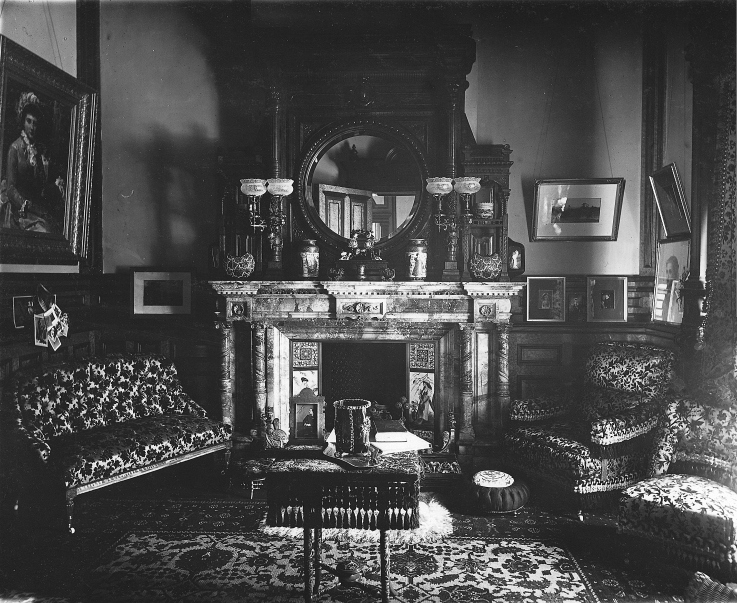
Lady's private sitting room (1884)

==== Attic floor ====
Originally, the attic floor included these rooms: a butler's room, a housekeeper's room, rooms reserved for higher-class servants, a pantry, a lobby containing the electric call panel for the servants (via electric bells placed in all the main rooms of the house) and a service staircase leading from the floor to the attic.

=== Garden ===
The extensive park or garden of the George-Stephen house was originally intended to enhance the residence. It once stretched as far west as Mountain Street and as far south as the alleyway. The garden was laid out in the English style. The park was once planted primarily with trees that provided shade for visitors. The park was also a place for entertainment and gatherings during the summer.

== The house in the cinema ==
The mansion has also been used as a filming location in numerous films and television series, including The Covenant (2006 film), Killer Wave (2007), The Mummy: Tomb of the Dragon Emperor (2008), The Smurfs 2 (2013), Warm Bodies (2013) and Bye Bye 2013. Alec Baldwin, Christopher Plummer, Eric Roberts, Pierre Nadeau, Brendan Fraser, Jennifer Love Hewitt and Richard Chamberlain are all actors featured in films that were shot in this residence.

== Sources ==
=== Books / works ===
List of publications in chronological order :

- Simon Vouet (First painter to the King); Michel Dorigny (engraver) (1647). Livre de diverses grotesques peintes : dans le cabinet de bains de la Reine Régente au Palais Royale (in French). Paris, France: Armand Guérinet. p. 65. SV.
- W. S. Mackay, Robert, ed. (1859–1870). The Montreal Directory. Montreal, Quebec: John Lovell. Lovell.
- Moses P. Handy (1893). The official directory of the World's Columbian exposition, May 1st to October 30th, 1893. A reference book of exhibitors and exhibits; of the officers and members of the World's Columbian commission, the world's Columbian exposition and the board of lady managers; a complete history of the exposition. Together with accurate descriptions of all state, territorial, foreign, departmental and other buildings and exhibits, and general information concerning the fair. Chicago, Illinois.: W. B. Gonkey Company. Handy.
- Gerald W. Armstrong (1959). The Mount Stephen Club, 1440 Drummond Street, Montreal, Quebec : a report on the former residence of Mr. George Stephen, later Lord Mount Stephen. Montreal (QC), Canada.: Student papers (McGill University. School of Architecture). p. 122. GWA-1959.
- Robert Lemire (1959). Inventaire des bâtiments construits entre 1919 et 1959 dans le vieux Montréal et les quartiers Saint-Georges et Saint-André. Montreal (QC), Canada.: Parcs Canada. p. 244. Parcs Canada1959.
- The story of the Mount Stephen Club, Montreal, Canada. Montreal (QC), Canada.: Mount Stephen Club. 1967. p. 24. MSC-1967.
- Rémillard, François (1986). Demeures bourgeoises de Montréal : le Mille carré, 1850-1930 : Maison George-Stephen (in French). Montreal, Quebec: Édition du Méridien. p. 242. ISBN 2-920417-08-8. Rémillard-1986.
- Communauté Urbaine de Montréal (1987). Répertoire d'architecture traditionnelle sur le territoire de la Communauté Urbaine de Montréal : Les résidences (in French). Vol. 1. Montreal, Quebec: Service de la planification du territoire (CUM). ISBN 2-920295-56-X. CUM.
- Pinard, Guy (1987). Montréal, son histoire, son architecture (in French). Vol. 2. Montreal, Quebec: Éditions La presse. p. 428. ISBN 2-89043-255-6.
- Péchoin, Diane (1996). Le petit Larousse illustré (in French). Paris, France: Éditions Larousse. p. 428. Dictionnaire Larousse1996.
- Piquette, Raymonde; Gerzovitz, Julia (2001). Club Mount Stephen : 75e anniversaire / Mount Stephen Club 75th Anniversary. Montreal (QC), Canada.: Mount Stephen Club. p. 43. MSC-2001.

=== Notorial acts ===
List of notorial acts in chronological order of publication:

- Doucet, J. (Notary) (September 23, 1863). Notorial Act en minute, Registry no. 36098 : "William Carter to Annie Charlotte Kane : Deed of Sale (Lot 1525)". Montréal Ancien : Montréal-Ouest. Notaries Records, Judicial District of Montreal: Superior Court Funds, National Archives of Quebec. AN-36098.
- Doucet, J. (Notary) (October 13, 1888). Notorial Act en minute, Registry no. 116483 : "William Laurie to Annie Charlotte Kane : Deed of Sale (Lot 1524-12 to Lot 1524-23)". Notaries Records, Judicial District of Montreal: Montréal Ancien : Montréal-Ouest. Superior Court Funds, National Archives of Quebec. AN-116483.
- Notorial Act en minute, Registry nos. 131156 and 131157 : "Declaration of transmission : Annie Charlotte Kane to George Stephen". Notaries Records, Judicial District of Montreal: Montréal Ancien : Montréal-Ouest. Superior Court Funds, National Archives of Quebec. July 6, 1896. AN-131156.
- Marler, William de M. (Notary) (October 4, 1900). Notorial Act en minute, Registry no. 134267 : "George Stephen to Robert Meighen : Deed of Sale". Notaries Records, Judicial District of Montreal: Montréal Ancien : Montréal-Ouest. Superior Court Funds, National Archives of Quebec. AN-134267.
- Marler, William de M. (Notary); Cholette, Edward (notary) (December 7, 1906). Notorial Act en minute, Registry no. 151528 : "Will of Robert Meighen". Notaries Records, Judicial District of Montreal: Montréal Ancien : Montréal-Ouest. Superior Court Funds, National Archives of Quebec. AN-151528.
- Reilly, E. H. (Notary) (October 14, 1927). Notorial Act en minute, Registry no. 157679 : "GDon Mar Realty Limited to Mount Stephen Club : Deed of Sale". Notaries Records, Judicial District of Montreal: Superior Court Funds, National Archives of Quebec. AN-157679.

=== Administrative Publications ===
- Assessment rolls for the Saint-Antoine Ward, City of Montreal. Montreal (Qc), Canada: Municipal Archives of the City of Montreal (Cote: CA M001 VM036-3-4). 1841–1917. AMVM.
- Registre foncier du Québec : Before July 20, 1999 : lots no. 1524-12 to 1524-23 and 1525 (Saint-Antoine Ward, City of Montreal). After July 20, 1999 : lot 1328870 (Montreal, Cadaster of Quebec). Long act, land district: "Montréal Ancien": Ministère des Ressources Naturelles et Faune. 1841–2025. RFQ.
- Land Management - Permits (Borough Ville-Marie) : 1430-1440, Drummond Street. Montreal (QC), Canada: City of Montreal. 1926–2026. PermitsMtl.

=== Newspaper Articles ===
List of newspaper articles in chronological order of publication:

- "Progress in Montreal. Drummond Street". Montreal Herald and Daily Commercial Gazette (Newspaper). Vol. 49, no. 165 (Robert Weir ed.). Montreal (QC), Canada. July 14, 1857. p. 1.
- "Splendid Villa Emplacement on Drummond Street". Montreal Herald and Daily Commercial Gazette (Newspaper). Vol. 67, no. 28 (Robert Weir ed.). Montreal (QC), Canada. February 3, 1875. p. 3.
- "City Items. (George Stephen House)". The Daily Witness (Newspaper). Vol. 20, no. 141 (John Dougall ed.). Montreal (QC), Canada. June 29, 1881. p. 8.
- "Special from Montreal. (Mr George Stephen's Mansion.)". Morning chronicle and commercial and shipping gazette (Newspaper). Vol. 35, no. 12868 (Charles St. Michel,1850-1888 ed.). Montreal (QC), Canada. June 30, 1881. p. 4.
- "Building Operations". The Daily Witness (Newspaper). Vol. 20, no. 160 (John Dougall ed.). Montreal (QC), Canada. July 23, 1881. p. 8.
- "Mr. George Stephen". Morning chronicle and commercial and shipping gazette (Newspaper). Vol. 35, no. 12946 (Charles St. Michel,1850-1888 ed.). Montreal (QC), Canada. September 30, 1881. p. 1.
- "Stephen Mansion". The Daily Witness (Newspaper). Vol. 21, no. 70 (John Dougall ed.). Montreal (QC), Canada. March 25, 1882. p. 8.
- "Arrivals from England. (Mr. George Stephen)". Montreal Herald and Daily Commercial Gazette (Newspaper). Vol. 74, no. 107 (Robert Weir ed.). Montreal (QC), Canada. May 5, 1882. p. 1.
- "Personal". Montreal Herald and Daily Commercial Gazette (Newspaper). Vol. 75, no. 79 (Robert Weir ed.). Montreal (QC), Canada. April 3, 1883. p. 3.
- "Personal". The Montreal daily star (Newspaper). Vol. 15, no. 128 (Graham & Co., proprietors, 1881-1951 ed.). Montreal (QC), Canada. June 1, 1883. p. 3.
- "Une demeure". L'évènement (Newspaper) (in French). Vol. 17, no. 18 (Québec : [L'événement], 1867-1938 ed.). Quebec City (QC), Canada. June 5, 1883. p. 7.
- "Montreal. George Stephen's Mansion". The Regina Leader (Newspaper). Vol. 1, no. 15. Regina, Saskatchewan, Canada. June 7, 1883. p. 1.
- "La splendide maison de M. Stephen". Le Sorelois (Newspaper) (in French). Vol. 5, no. 24 (Sorel : Cie d'imprimerie Richelieu, 1879-1966 ed.). Sorel (QC), Canada. June 8, 1883. p. 4.
- "Mr. George Stephen's House". The Montreal Star (Newspaper). Vol. 15, no. 135 (George T. Lanigan; Hugh Graham. ed.). Montreal (QC), Canada. June 9, 1883. p. 4.
- "Départs". L'évènement (Newspaper) (in French). Vol. 17, no. 23 (Québec : [L'événement], 1867-1938 ed.). Quebec City (QC), Canada. June 11, 1883. p. 7.
- "The Stained Glass at Mr. Geo. Stephen's Mansion". The Montreal Gazette (Newspaper). Vol. 112, no. 141 (Postmedia Network Inc. ed.). Montreal (QC), Canada. June 13, 1883. p. 3.
- "A Millionaire's Mansion. The Grandeur Of A Railway Magnate's Residence". The Globe (Newspaper). Vol. 40, no. 144 (The Globe and Mail (1844-1936) ed.). Toronto (ON), Canada. June 16, 1883. p. 7.
- "Offices on St. James Street". Montreal Herald and Daily Commercial Gazette (Newspaper). Vol. 75, no. 182 (Robert Weir ed.). Montreal (QC), Canada. August 1, 1883. p. 7.
- "Highly Important Sale, Thursday, 6th September. (Thomas J. Potter)". Montreal Herald and Daily Commercial Gazette (Newspaper). Vol. 75, no. 204 (Robert Weir ed.). Montreal (QC), Canada. August 27, 1883. p. 5.
- "Auction Sales. By Thomas J" Potter". Montreal Herald and Daily Commercial Gazette (Newspaper). Vol. 75, no. 214 (Robert Weir ed.). Montreal (QC), Canada. September 7, 1883. p. 5.
- "Lord Carnarvon". The Montreal daily star (Newspaper). Vol. 15, no. 220 (Graham & Co., proprietors, 1881-1951 ed.). Montreal (QC), Canada. September 18, 1883. p. 4.
- "Reception in honor of Lord Carnarvon". Morning chronicle and commercial and shipping gazette (Newspaper). Vol. 37, no. 13554 (Charles St. Michel, 1850-1888 ed.). Montreal (QC), Canada. September 19, 1883. p. 1.
- "Arrival of the Gorverner-General and the Princess". Morning chronicle and commercial and shipping gazette (Newspaper). Vol. 37, no. 13560 (Charles St. Michel, 1850-1888 ed.). Montreal (QC), Canada. September 26, 1883. p. 2.
- "The Viceregal Party. Arrival in Montreal - His Excellency visits Bonsecours Church. Guests of Mr. Geo. Stephen". Morning chronicle and commercial and shipping gazette (Newspaper). Vol. 37, no. 13561 (Charles St. Michel, 1850-1888 ed.). Montreal (QC), Canada. September 27, 1883. p. 2.
- "A Canadian Railway King. Career of Mr. George Stephen". Montreal Herald and Daily Commercial Gazette (Newspaper). Vol. 75, no. 260 (Robert Weir ed.). Montreal (QC), Canada. October 31, 1883. p. 6.
- "A Millionaire's Mansion. A Railway Magnate's Palatial Residence. George Stephen's Home. One Million Dollars Invested in Luxury". The Brantford Daily Expositor (Newspaper). Vol. 11, no. 251. Brantford (ON), Canada. February 8, 1884. p. 1.
- "Montreal's Buildings. The Mansion of Mr. Geor. Stephen. President of the Canadian Pacific Railway". Montreal weekly witness commercial review and family news paper (Newspaper). Vol. 38 (Bibliothèque nationale du Québec, 1972 ed.). Montreal (QC), Canada. March 12, 1884. p. 1.
- "Les édifices de Montréal. Le palais de M. Geo. Stephens, président du chemin de fer du Pacifique Canadien". L'évènement (Newspaper) (in French). Vol. 17, no. 252 (Québec : [L'événement], 1867-1938 ed.). Quebec City (QC), Canada. March 17, 1884. p. 2.
- "A Magnificent Instrument. The Piano Constructed for Mr. George Stephen". The Montreal daily star (Newspaper). Vol. 16, no. 148 (Graham & Co., proprietors, 1881-1951 ed.). Montreal (QC), Canada. June 24, 1884. p. 1.
- "George Stephen House". Ottawa Daily Citizen (Newspaper). Vol. 16, no. 157. Ottawa (ON), Canada. July 5, 1884. p. 2.
- "A Pullman Caravansary". The Montreal daily star (Newspaper). Vol. 16, no. 164 (Graham & Co., proprietors, 1881-1951 ed.). Montreal (QC), Canada. July 14, 1884. p. 2.
- "Their Excellencies Lord and Lady Lansdowne". Montreal Herald and Daily Commercial Gazette (Newspaper). Vol. 76, no. 221 (Robert Weir ed.). Montreal (QC), Canada. September 16, 1884. p. 4.
- "Arrival of Lord Lansdowne". The Montreal daily star (Newspaper). Vol. 17, no. 22 (Graham & Co., proprietors, 1881-1951 ed.). Montreal (QC), Canada. January 27, 1885. p. 4.
- "Horticultural Society". The Montreal daily star (Newspaper). Vol. 17, no. 51 (Graham & Co., proprietors, 1881-1951 ed.). Montreal (QC), Canada. March 2, 1885. p. 4.
- "Wm. Rutherford & Co. (Ad)". The Daily Witness (Newspaper). Vol. 26, no. 197 (John Dougall ed.). Montreal (QC), Canada. August 19, 1885. p. 3.
- "Personals. (George Stephen's baronetcy)". Morning chronicle and commercial and shipping gazette (Newspaper). Vol. 40, no. 14277 (Charles St. Michel, 1850-1888 ed.). Montreal (QC), Canada. January 21, 1886. p. 2.
- "Among the flowers. The Montreal Horticultural Society's Prizes for Private Conservatories and Window Gardens". The Montreal daily star (Newspaper). Vol. 18, no. 51 (Graham & Co., proprietors, 1881-1951 ed.). Montreal (QC), Canada. March 2, 1886. p. 3.
- "Window Gardens". The Daily Witness (Newspaper). Vol. 27, no. 51 (John Dougall ed.). Montreal (QC), Canada. March 3, 1886. p. 2.
- "Our Own Canadian Tweeds". The Daily Witness (Newspaper). Vol. 27, no. 53 (John Dougall ed.). Montreal (QC), Canada. March 5, 1886. p. 5.
- "The Scottish Delegates. Visiting the Lions of the City to Day". The Montreal daily star (Newspaper). Vol. 18, no. 191 (Graham & Co., proprietors, 1881-1951 ed.). Montreal (QC), Canada. August 16, 1886. p. 4.
- "Résidence princière (Métis)". L'électeur (Newspaper) (in French). Vol. 7, no. 84 (Québec : Co. d'impr. de Québec, 1880-1896 ed.). Quebec City (QC), Canada. October 22, 1886. p. 3.
- "Sir George Stephens' House at Metis". Morning chronicle and commercial and shipping gazette (Newspaper). Vol. 40, no. 14524 (Charles St. Michel, 1850-1888 ed.). Montreal (QC), Canada. October 25, 1886. p. 2.
- "Sir George's Summer House". The Daily Witness (Newspaper). Vol. 27, no. 250 (John Dougall ed.). Montreal (QC), Canada. October 25, 1886. p. 6.
- "Sir George's New House. (Metis)". The Montreal daily star (Newspaper). Vol. 18, no. 252 (Graham & Co., proprietors, 1881-1951 ed.). Montreal (QC), Canada. October 25, 1886. p. 1.
- "Sir George Stephen's lovely residence". The Montreal daily star (Newspaper). Vol. 19, no. 194 (Graham & Co., proprietors, 1881-1951 ed.). Montreal (QC), Canada. August 20, 1887. p. 6.
- "Personal. Lunch by Sir Geo. Stephen". The Montreal daily star (Newspaper). Vol. 19, no. 256 (Graham & Co., proprietors, 1881-1951 ed.). Montreal (QC), Canada. November 1, 1887. p. 8.
- "To Build the Finest Residence in Canada". The Daily Times (Newspaper). April 27, 1889. p. 2.
- "A Genuine Surprise. Sir George Stephen, Bart. confirms the Rumor that he has resigned the Presidency of the C.P.R.". The Montreal daily star (Newspaper). Vol. 20, no. 184 (Graham & Co., proprietors, 1881-1951 ed.). Montreal (QC), Canada. August 7, 1888. p. 4.
- "Transactions". The Montreal daily star (Newspaper). Vol. 20, no. 239 (Graham & Co., proprietors, 1881-1951 ed.). Montreal (QC), Canada. October 10, 1888. p. 4.
- "Sir George Stephen returns to the city from Europe". The Montreal daily star (Newspaper). Vol. 21, no. 96 (Graham & Co., proprietors, 1881-1951 ed.). Montreal (QC), Canada. April 24, 1889. p. 4.
- "The Duke and Duchess of Connaught". The Daily Witness (Newspaper). Vol. 31, no. 81 (John Dougall ed.). Montreal (QC), Canada. April 7, 1890. p. 5.
- "Mme Albanie est arrivée". L'électeur (Newspaper) (in French). Vol. 10, no. 245 (Québec : Co. d'impr. de Québec, 1880-1896 ed.). Quebec City (QC), Canada. May 6, 1890. p. 4.
- "Le duc de Connaught à Montréal". Le Courrier du Canada : journal des intérêts canadiens (Newspaper) (in French). Vol. 12, no. 273 (Québec, 1857-1901 ed.). Quebec City (QC), Canada. May 31, 1890. p. 3.
- "A Most Pleasant Impression". The Montreal daily star (Newspaper). Vol. 22, no. 130 (Graham & Co., proprietors, 1881-1951 ed.). Montreal (QC), Canada. June 4, 1890. p. 2.
- "Vente par Autorité de Justice. (Rutherford & Co.)". La Minerve (Newspaper) (in French). Vol. 63, no. 86 (Augustin-Norbert Morin ed.). Montreal (QC), Canada. October 22, 1890. p. 2.
- "Canada's First Lord Arrives". The Montreal herald (Newspaper). Vol. 84, no. 200 (The Herald Company ed.). Montreal (QC), Canada. August 21, 1891. p. 8.
- "Lord Mount-Stephen's Montreal Residence for Sale". The Montreal daily star (Newspaper). Vol. 24, no. 94 (Graham & Co., proprietors, 1881-1951 ed.). Montreal (QC), Canada. April 21, 1892. p. 8.
- "Palatial Residences for Sale". The Montreal herald (Newspaper). Vol. 85, no. 95 (The Herald Company ed.). Montreal (QC), Canada. April 22, 1891. p. 8.
- "Proposed Millionaire's Club". The Montreal daily star (Newspaper). Vol. 24, no. 121 (Graham & Co., proprietors, 1881-1951 ed.). Montreal (QC), Canada. May 23, 1892. p. 6.
- "Dernières dépêches. Nouvelles de Montréal. Émigration de millionnaires". L'électeur (Newspaper) (in French). Vol. 12, no. 250 (Québec : Co. d'impr. de Québec, 1880-1896 ed.). Quebec City (QC), Canada. April 25, 1892. p. 4.
- "A Vice-Regal Residence in Montreal". The Montreal daily star (Newspaper). Vol. 25, no. 267 (Graham & Co., proprietors, 1881-1951 ed.). Montreal (QC), Canada. November 13, 1893. p. 8.
- "Les jolies résidences de Montréal offertes à la Ville pour un choix d'un château vice-royal". Le Monde Illustré (Newspaper) (in French). Vol. 10, no. 500 (Berthiaume et Sabourin, 1884-1902 ed.). Montreal (QC), Canada. December 3, 1893. p. 7.
- "The Month of Weddings. Mr. Robert Redford Wedded to Miss Meighen in St. Paul's". The Gazette (Newspaper). Vol. 123, no. 141 (Graham & Co., proprietors, 1881-1951 ed.). Montreal (QC), Canada. June 13, 1894. p. 5.
- "The indicator. A New Real Estate Monthly Makes It Appearance". Montreal daily herald (Newspaper). Vol. 88, no. 9 (James N. Greenshields, 1892-1896 ed.). Montreal (QC), Canada. January 10, 1895. p. 6.
- "Handsome Residence Sold. Lord Mount Stephen's House Changes Hands". The Montreal daily star (Newspaper). Vol. 28, no. 49 (Graham & Co., proprietors, 1881-1951 ed.). Montreal (QC), Canada. February 27, 1896. p. 8.
- "La Maison de Lord Stephens". La presse (Newspaper) (in French). Vol. 12, no. 99 ([La presse], 1884-2017 ed.). Montreal (QC), Canada. February 28, 1896. p. 1.
- "Mount-Stephens Residence Sold". Montreal daily herald (Newspaper). Vol. 89, no. 51 (James N. Greenshields, 1892-1896 ed.). Montreal (QC), Canada. February 28, 1896. p. 3.
- "Handsome Residence Sold. Lord Mount Stephen's House Changes Hands". Quebec morning chronicle (Newspaper). Vol. 50, no. 18301 (John J. Foote, 1888-1898 ed.). Quebec City (QC), Canada. February 29, 1896. p. 2.
- "The Late Mr John Stephen". The Daily Witness (Newspaper). Vol. 37, no. 90 (John Dougall ed.). Montreal (QC), Canada. April 16, 1896. p. 3.
- "Mr. J. H. Hutchison". The Canadian Architect and Builder (Newspaper). Vol. X, no. 1. Montreal (QC), Canada. January 1, 1897. p. 22.
- "Dazzling City in Fairyland. How Montreal Looked Las Evening By the Electric Light. Up Beaver Hall Hill". The Herald (Newspaper). Vol. 90, no. 145 (The Herald Publishing Company, 1896-1899 ed.). Montreal (QC), Canada. June 23, 1897. p. 6.
- "Residence of Lord Mount Stephen". The Canadian Architect and Builder (Newspaper). Vol. XII, no. 3. Montreal (QC), Canada. March 3, 1899. p. 52.1.
- "Delightful ball at Mr. and Mrs. Robert Meighen's Residence". The Herald (Newspaper). Vol. 91, no. 267 (The Herald Publishing Company, 1896-1899 ed.). Montreal (QC), Canada. November 12, 1898. p. 6.
- "Mrs. Meighen's Ball". The Montreal daily star (Newspaper). Vol. 30, no. 267 (Graham & Co., proprietors, 1881-1951 ed.). Montreal (QC), Canada. November 12, 1898. p. 11.
- "Meighen Buys". The Montreal Herald (Newspaper). Vol. 93, no. 248 (The Herald Publishing Company, 1899-1914 ed.). Montreal (QC), Canada. October 20, 1900. p. 1.
- "Beautiful Homes of Montreal. Mr. Robt. Meighen's Residence". The Montreal Herald (Newspaper). Vol. 94, no. 305 (The Herald Publishing Company, 1899-1914 ed.). Montreal (QC), Canada. December 28, 1901. p. 18.
- "The Building Trade. Mr. Robert Forsyth". The Daily Witness (Newspaper). Vol. 43, no. 287 (John Dougall ed.). Montreal (Qc), Canada. December 6, 1902. p. 15.
- "Tapestries (Les Douze Mois Grotesques). Grafton Galleries". London Daily News (Newspaper). No. 17872. London, UK. July 2, 1903. p. 8.
- "Raffia Embroidery". The Daily Witness (Newspaper). Vol. 45, no. 255 (John Dougall ed.). Montreal (QC), Canada. October 31, 1903. p. 18.
- "Mrs. Meighen's Ball". Beautiful Homes in Old Montreal. The Residence Mr. Robert Meighen. (Newspaper). Vol. 35, no. 289 (Graham & Co., proprietors, 1881-1951 ed.). Montreal (QC), Canada. December 5, 1903. p. 2.
- "Mr. W. Stephen Died at 1 O'Clock". The Montreal Herald (Newspaper). Vol. 96, no. 204 (The Herald Publishing Company, 1899-1914 ed.). Montreal (QC), Canada. September 2, 1904. p. 3.
- "Stables and Residences. Two Influential Deputations Wait on the fire Committee. A stop to Stable Construction on Stanley and Mackay Streets". The Daily Witness (Newspaper). Vol. 47, no. 83 (John Dougall ed.). Montreal (QC), Canada. April 6, 1906. p. 9.
- "Uses of Raffia and Rattan". The Queen (Newspaper). Vol. 121, no. 3143. London, UK. March 23, 1907. p. 58.
- "Conservatories Open". The Daily Witness (Newspaper). Vol. 49, no. 44 (John Dougall ed.). Montreal (QC), Canada. February 21, 1908. p. 3.
- "Lord Roberts". La patrie (Newspaper) (in French). Vol. 30, no. 125 (Montréal, 1879-1957 ed.). Montreal (QC), Canada. July 20, 1908. p. 8.
- "Lord Roberts". The Standard. (Newspaper). Vol. 4, no. 31 (The Montreal Standard Publishing Company Limited, 1905-1951 ed.). Montreal (QC), Canada. August 1, 1908. p. 14.
- "Lord Roberts". The Gazette (Newspaper). Vol. 138, no. 184. Montreal (QC), Canada. August 1, 1908. p. 16.
- "Canadian Business Life Poorer to-day by Death of Mr. Robert Meighen". The Daily Witness (Newspaper). Vol. 52, no. 162 (John Dougall ed.). Montreal (QC), Canada. July 13, 1911. p. 1.
- "A Picturesque Snowscape in Montreal. The Residence of Col. Meighen". The Standard. (Newspaper). Vol. 8, no. 52 (The Montreal Standard Publishing Company Limited, 1905-1951 ed.). Montreal (QC), Canada. December 28, 1912. p. 2.
- "Our Needlework Corner. Raffia Embroidery For Cushion Covers". Montreal witness and Canadian homestead the people's paper (Newspaper). Vol. 79, no. 27 (Bibliothèque nationale du Québec, 1972 ed.). Montreal (QC), Canada. July 2, 1924. p. 17.
- "Riche demeure qui est vendue". Le nouvelliste (Newspaper) (in French). Vol. 6, no. 170 (Le nouvelliste,[1920]- ed.). Three-Rivers (QC), Canada. May 21, 1926. p. 1.
- "Robert Meighen Residence is Sold". The Gazette (Newspaper). Vol. 155, no. 121. Montreal (QC), Canada. May 21, 1926. p. 14.
- "$225,000 Paid For Fine Old Mansion. Mount Stephen Club Secures Monument to Building Art At Big Reduction". The Gazette (Newspaper). Vol. 155, no. 271. Montreal (QC), Canada. November 12, 1926. p. 10.
- "Quebec Companies Granted Charters. Mount Stephen Club". The Montreal daily star (Newspaper). Vol. 59, no. 1 (Graham & Co., proprietors, 1881-1951 ed.). Montreal (QC), Canada. January 3, 1927. p. 8.
- "To Open in November. Mount Stephen Club Now Undergoing Alteration". The Gazette (Newspaper). Vol. 156, no. 163. Montreal (QC), Canada. July 7, 1927. p. 14.
- "For Sale. The Best Looking Property in Montreal. (Ad by James H. Maher)". The Gazette (Newspaper). Vol. 156, no. 183. Montreal (QC), Canada. August 2, 1927. p. 20.
- "Famous Mansion is Reopened as Mount Stephen Club". The Montreal daily star (Newspaper). Vol. 59, no. 290 (Graham & Co., proprietors, 1881-1951 ed.). Montreal (QC), Canada. December 7, 1927. p. 8.
- "Two Exceptional Properties. (Ad by Property Corporation of Canada Limited.)". The Montreal daily star (Newspaper). Vol. 60, no. 70 (Graham & Co., proprietors, 1881-1951 ed.). Montreal (QC), Canada. March 23, 1928. p. 28.
- "An Exclusive Medical Building". The Gazette (Newspaper). Vol. 159, no. 257. Montreal (QC), Canada. October 27, 1930. p. 18.
- "Déjeuners-Causeries". Bulletin mensuel de la Chambre de commerce française au Canada (Newspaper) (in French). Vol. March–April (La Chambre, 1931-1935 ed.). Montreal (QC), Canada. January 1, 1935. p. 11.
- Run Marsh (January 1, 1947). "Escape from Business Life Found In Montreal's Luxurious Clubs". The Gazette (Newspaper). Vol. 169, no. 1. Montreal (QC), Canada. p. 13.
- "New director of Mount Stephen Club". The Westmount examiner (Newspaper). Vol. 35, no. 10 (Examiner Publishing Company Limited, 1935-2015 ed.). Westmount (QC), Canada. March 9, 1967. p. 5.
- Helene Rochester (October 27, 1969). "Mount Stephen chef says "This is life"". The Montreal daily star (Newspaper). Vol. 101, no. 250 (Graham & Co., proprietors, 1881-1951 ed.). Montreal (QC), Canada. p. 10.
- Josette Bourbonnais (July 13, 1972). "Le club le plus somptueux d'Amérique est à Montréal". La patrie : l'hebdo des canadiens-français (Newspaper) (in French). Vol. 93, no. 29 (La Chambre, 1931-1935 ed.). Montreal (QC), Canada. p. 5.
- Dusty Vineberg (July 21, 1973). "Victorian Sherbrooke Street. More Buildings Threatened". The Montreal daily star (Newspaper). Vol. 105, no. 176 (Graham & Co., proprietors, 1881-1951 ed.). Montreal (QC), Canada. p. A1 et A6.
- Dusty Vineberg (July 21, 1973). "Quebec launches building study. Three may get special statuts". The Montreal daily star (Newspaper). Vol. 105, no. 176 (Graham & Co., proprietors, 1881-1951 ed.). Montreal (QC), Canada. p. A6.
- Edgar Andrew Collard (May 25, 1974). "Of Many Things... Life inside Montreal's old mansions". The Gazette (Newspaper). Vol. 196. Montreal (QC), Canada. p. 8.
- Michael Ballantyne (April 12, 1975). "The Stately Home of Clubland". The Montreal daily star (Newspaper). Vol. 107, no. 86 (Graham & Co., proprietors, 1881-1951 ed.). Montreal (QC), Canada. p. 144.
- David Gersovitz (April 12, 1975). "A man's club is his castle". The Montreal daily star (Newspaper). Vol. 107, no. 86 (Graham & Co., proprietors, 1881-1951 ed.). Montreal (QC), Canada.
- "Old club becomes historic site". The Montreal daily star (Newspaper). Vol. 107 (Graham & Co., proprietors, 1881-1951 ed.). Montreal (QC), Canada. April 15, 1975. p. A10.
- "Le Mount Stephen Club et les moulins à vent de Repentigny et Verchères monuments historiques". Le Devoir (Newspaper) (in French). Vol. 67, no. 160 (Le devoir, 1910- ed.). Montreal (QC), Canada. July 15, 1975. p. 3.
- "Tandis que les hommes d'Affaires francophones y prennent goût, les clubs privés en déclin chez les anglophones". La presse (Newspaper) (in French). Vol. 95, no. 77 ([La presse], 1884-2017 ed.). Montreal (QC), Canada. March 31, 1979. p. A9.
- Guy Pinard (August 20, 1989). "Le club Mount Stephen". La presse (Newspaper) (in French). Vol. 105, no. 296 ([La presse], 1884-2017 ed.). Montreal (QC), Canada. p. D6.
- Marion McCormick (November 10, 1990). "The anglophone elite : high noon to twilight". The Gazette (Newspaper). Vol. 212. Montreal (QC), Canada. p. 106.
- Alan Hustak (November 12, 1990). "The Elite's Retreats. How Montreal's private clubs are coping with the recession". The Gazette (Newspaper). Vol. 212. Montreal (QC), Canada. p. 41.
- François Berger (March 23, 1996). "La maison George-Stephen : un bijou de bois sculpté". La presse (Newspaper) (in French). Vol. 112 ([La presse], 1884-2017 ed.). Montreal (QC), Canada. p. MontToit.
- Daniel Lemay (January 8, 2010). "Les clubs privés s'adaptent au siècle". La presse (Newspaper) (in French) ([La presse], 1884-2017 ed.). Montreal (QC), Canada.
- "Le Mount Stephen Club ferme ses portes". La presse (Newspaper) (in French) ([La presse], 1884-2017 ed.). Montreal (QC), Canada. October 18, 2011.
- "Le Mount Stephen Club ferme après 85 ans". Argent (Newspaper) (in French). Montreal (QC), Canada. December 23, 2011.
- "Le Club Mount Stephen deviendra un hôtel". Journal de Montréal (Newspaper) (in French). Montreal (QC), Canada. September 26, 2012.
- Marian Scott (January 26, 2016). "Facade of heritage jewel Mount Stephen Club "has to be taken down"". Montreal Gazette (Newspaper). Montreal (QC), Canada.
- René Bruemmer (March 22, 2016). "City inspectors did not visit Mount Stephen Club for 15 months". Montreal Gazette (Newspaper). Montreal (QC), Canada.
- Marian Scott (April 13, 2016). "The good, the bad and the ugly: French expert assesses Montreal architecture". Montreal Gazette (Newspaper). Montreal (QC), Canada.
- Marian Scott (April 14, 2016). "Dismantling of Mount Stephen Club facade to begin". Montreal Gazette (Newspaper). Montreal (QC), Canada.
- Marian Scott (May 3, 2016). "Mount Stephen Club's structural problems date back at least 15 years: documents". Montreal Gazette (Newspaper). Montreal (QC), Canada.
- Marian Scott (May 16, 2016). "Culture officials initially opposed hotel tower for Mount Stephen Club: documents". Montreal Gazette (Newspaper). Montreal (QC), Canada.
- Andréanne Chevalier (May 1, 2017). "L'hôtel Mount Stephen ouvre ses portes". Journal Métro (Newspaper) (in French). Montreal (QC), Canada.

=== Statutes, regulations and decrees ===
- Règlement révisant le plan d'urbanisme de la ville de Montréal [Regulation revising the urban planning plan of the City of Montreal] (Regulation 04-047) (in French). City Council of the City of Montreal (Quebec). December 10, 2004. REG-04-047.

=== Websites ===
- Canadian Architect Awards of Excellence (December 1, 2012). "Mount Stephen Club. Lemay (LemayLab)". canadianarchitect.com. Quebec City (QC), Canada.: Canadian Architect.
- The Historic Sites and Monuments Board of Canada (December 1, 2012). "George Stephen House National Historic Site of Canada". historicplaces.ca. Ottawa (ON), Canada.: Canadian Register of Historic Places (CRHP).
- Alexander Reford (2005). "STEPHEN, GEORGE, 1st Baron MOUNT STEPHEN". Dictionary of Canadian Biography, vol. 15. Toronto (ON), Canada.: University of Toronto / Université Laval.
- Alexander Reford (2005). "MEIGHEN, ROBERT". Dictionary of Canadian Biography, vol. 15. Toronto (ON), Canada.: University of Toronto / Université Laval.
- Chris Cunneen (1988). "Henry Stafford Northcote (1846–1911)". Dictionary of Australian Biography. Sydney, Australia.: Melbourne University Press.
- "Le Mount Stephen Hotel". Le Mount Stephen Hotel. Montreal (QC), Canada.: Groupe hôtelier et immobilier Tidan. 2017.
- "Sites emblématiques menacés". heritagemontreal.org. Montreal (QC), Canada.: Héritage Montréal. 2011.
- Lemay / Leclerc Architectes (2012). "Mount Stephen Club and Hotel Complex, Montreal, Quebec, Canada" (PDF). Lemay.qc.ca/. Montreal (QC), Canada.: Héritage Montréal.
- Gouvernement du Québec (2007). "Édifice du Mount Stephen Club". Répertoire du patrimoine culturel du Québec. Quebec City (QC), Canada.: Ministère de la Culture.
- "Mount Stephen Club". Registre des entreprises du Québec. Quebec City (QC), Canada.: Registraire des entreprises.
- SkyscraperPage. "Le Cristofe Alexandre". SkyscraperPage.com.
- Montreal City Hall. "Rôle de l'évaluation foncière : 1430-1440 Rue Drummond". Montreal City Assessment.
- Montreal City Hall. "George Stephen House". Grand répertoire du patrimoine bâti de Montréal.
