= List of gentlemen's clubs in Canada =

The following list is of gentlemen's clubs that operated in Canada. A gentlemen's club is a private social club that serves as a place for men to dine, drink, read, and socialize. They originated in the 18th century as a type of British social institution and flourished particularly in the 19th century. Around 50 such clubs operated at one time or other in Canada, though by the turn of the millennium, virtually none continued to exist in this form.

== History ==
As a part of the British Empire, Canadians adopted the gentlemen's club tradition enthusiastically. Most of Canada's clubs were founded during the Victorian era and used similar rules to their British counterparts, including: a proscription on discussions about politics and religion, silence in reading rooms, and a ban on smoking in dining areas. Moreover, clubs oriented towards businessmen prohibited briefcases in dining rooms.

Wallace Clement described Canada's gentlemen's clubs as "one of the key institutions which form an interacting and active national upper class." Clement listed the six most important clubs as the National, York, Toronto, Mount Royal, Saint James's, and Rideau. Meanwhile, Peter C. Newman stated that the clubs that "really count" were the York, Toronto, National, Mount Royal, Saint James's, Rideau, and Vancouver.

By the 1970s, gentlemen's clubs had started to decline in prestige and importance. Several factors contributed to this decline. During the preceding decade, Canada had begun to abandon its British culture, traditions, and symbols. Bryan Palmer described this process as a shift in "self-conception away from an age-old attachment to empire, in which comfort could be taken from a prideful understanding of keeping alive European traditions." As quintessentially British institutions, gentlemen's clubs suffered from this transformation. Another reason was that the baby boomer generation that had come of age during the countercultural revolution was skeptical of authority, tradition, and formality, all of which gentlemen's clubs embodied. Consequently, baby boomers joined private clubs in far smaller numbers than preceding generations. Finally, changes to Canadian tax law forbade members from writing off club dues as business expenses.

In his 1975 tome The Canadian Establishment, author and journalist Peter C. Newman devoted a chapter to gentlemen's clubs, entitled "Clubland on the Rocks." Newman described the generational change that was leading to the decline in clubs, saying,

Not so very long ago, at lunchtime on any given weekday, the nation's Establishment conducted most of its charitable, commercial, and political liaisons inside club dining rooms. This is no longer true. The new-breed wheelers are dealing downtown in the smart places where they can sniff out the fast money, looking past their luncheon companions' shoulders to see who's breaking bread with their competitors.

In the 1970s, many clubs began to struggle financially. These financial difficulties, coupled with pressure from feminists who opposed all-male clubs, led all of Canada's gentlemen's clubs to cease operating as such and begin accepting female members. During the following decades many clubs continued to struggle attracting new members.

By 1998, in his third volume of the Canadian Establishment series, Newman concluded that Canada's clubs had faded into total irrelevancy. In a chapter entitled "Boarding Up the Private Clubs," he wrote,

the classic men's dining clubs have become relics of another age. Like the Old Establishment adherents whom they fed, housed and cosseted, there institutions depended on exclusivity for their justification. Now that the Establishment is open to anybody, regardless of their pedigree or school tie, the clubs that perpetuated those notions have lost their reason for existence. To be clubbable means precisely nothing.

Since the 1980s, many clubs have closed, merged, or reformed. Today, Canada's former gentlemen's clubs function mostly as business and networking institutions and provide themed event nights for their members. Along with moving to a mixed-sex format, most clubs have adopted more casual dress and behavioural codes.

== List of clubs ==
Name	Province	City	Established	Became mixed-sex	Original affiliation	Fate
400 Club	Alberta	Calgary	1951	1989	Petroleum industry	Closed in 2002
Albany Club	Ontario	Toronto	1882	1979	Conservative Party	
American Club of Toronto	Ontario	Toronto	1913	-	American expats	Closed in 1916
Arts and Letters Club of Toronto	Ontario	Toronto	1908	1985	Arts	
Assiniboia Club	Saskatchewan	Regina	1882	1988	none	Closed in 2007
Beaver Club	Quebec	Montreal	1785	-	Fur trade	Closed in 1827
Brantford Club	Ontario	Brantford	1898	1990	none	
British Public Schools Club	British Columbia	Victoria	1926	-	Public schools	Closed in 1978
British Public Schools Club of Vancouver	British Columbia	Vancouver	1932	-	Public schools	Closed in 1968
Calgary Petroleum Club	Alberta	Calgary	1948	1989	Petroleum industry	
Carleton Club	Manitoba	Winnipeg	1901	1991	none	Closed in 1995
Chinook Club	Alberta	Lethbridge	1901	199?	none	Closed
Club Saint-Denis	Quebec	Montreal	1874	198?	Francophone	Closed in 2009; reopened in 2023
Cypress Club	Alberta	Medicine Hat	1903	19??	none	
Edmonton Club	Alberta	Edmonton	1899	1986	none	Closed in 1994
Edmonton Petroleum Club	Alberta	Edmonton	1950	1987	Petroleum industry	Closed in 2015; reorganised in 2020 as the Edmonton City Club
Engineers' Club of Toronto	Ontario	Toronto	1895	198?	Engineering	Merged into the Ontario Club in 1992
Engineers' Club of Montreal	Quebec	Montreal	1902	?	Engineering	Closed in 1979
Frontenac Club	Ontario	Kingston	1907	-	none	Closed in 1931; Frontenac Club Inn opened in 2000
Garrison Club	Quebec	Quebec City	1879	1984	Army	Merged in 1984 with the Cercle Universitaire to become the Cercle de la Garrison
Halifax Club	Nova Scotia	Halifax	1862	1986	none	Closed in 2025
Hamilton Club	Ontario	Hamilton	1873	1986	none	
High River Club	Alberta	High River	1906	-	none	
Kent Club	Ontario	Chatham	1932		none	
Laurentian Club	Ontario	Ottawa	1904		none	Closed in 2000
London Club	Ontario	London	1880	1993	none	
Manitoba Club	Manitoba	Winnipeg	1874	1991	none	
Montefiore Club	Manitoba	Winnipeg	1910		Jewish	Closed
Montefiore Club	Quebec	Montreal	1880	2005	Jewish	Closed in 2010
Montreal Club	Quebec	Montreal	1865		none	Closed in 1970
Mount Royal Club	Quebec	Montreal	1899	1990	none	
Mount Stephen Club	Quebec	Montreal	1926	198?	none	Closed in 2011
National Club	Ontario	Toronto	1874	1992	Canada First	
Niagara Falls Club	Ontario	Niagara Falls	1948		none	Closed in 1994
Ontario Club	Ontario	Toronto	1909	1985	Liberal Party	Merged into the National Club in 2010
Ottawa Club	Ontario	Ottawa	1888	-	none	Closed ca. 1910
Pacific Club	British Columbia	Victoria	1885	-	none	Closed in 1966
Primrose Club	Ontario	Toronto	1907		Jewish	Closed ca. 1996
Quadra Club	British Columbia	Vancouver	1922	-	none	Closed in 1940; reopened as a tavern in 1941
Ranchmen's Club	Alberta	Calgary	1892	1993	none	
Renfrew Club	Alberta	Calgary	1929	-	none	Merged into Calgary Petroleum Club in 1950
Rideau Club	Ontario	Ottawa	1865	1979	none	
Rossland Club	British Columbia	Rossland	1896	-	none	Closed in 1969
Saint James's Club	Quebec	Montreal	1857	1979	none	
Saskatoon Club	Saskatchewan	Saskatoon	1907	1989	none	
St Catharines Club	Ontario	St. Catharines	1878	1985	none	
Terminal City Club	British Columbia	Vancouver	1892	1991	none	
Toronto Club	Ontario	Toronto	1835	1993	none	
Union Club	New Brunswick	Saint John	1884	1936	none	
Union Club of British Columbia	British Columbia	Victoria	1879	1994	none	
United Services Club	Quebec	Montreal	1922	-	Military	Closed in 1994
University Club of Montreal	Quebec	Montreal	1906	1988	University graduates	
University Club of Ottawa	Ontario	Ottawa	1913		University graduates	Closed in 1978
University Club of Toronto	Ontario	Toronto	1906	1988	University graduates	
University Club of Vancouver	British Columbia	Vancouver	1911	-	University graduates	Merged into the Vancouver Club in 1986
Vancouver Club	British Columbia	Vancouver	1893	1993	none	
Waterloo Club	Ontario	Waterloo	1913	2015	none	Closed in 2021
Western Club	British Columbia	Vancouver	1901	-	none	Merged with part of the University Club to form the Quadra Club in 1922
Windsor Club	Ontario	Windsor	1903	1985	none	
York Club	Ontario	Toronto	1909	1992	none	

== Gallery of clubhouses ==
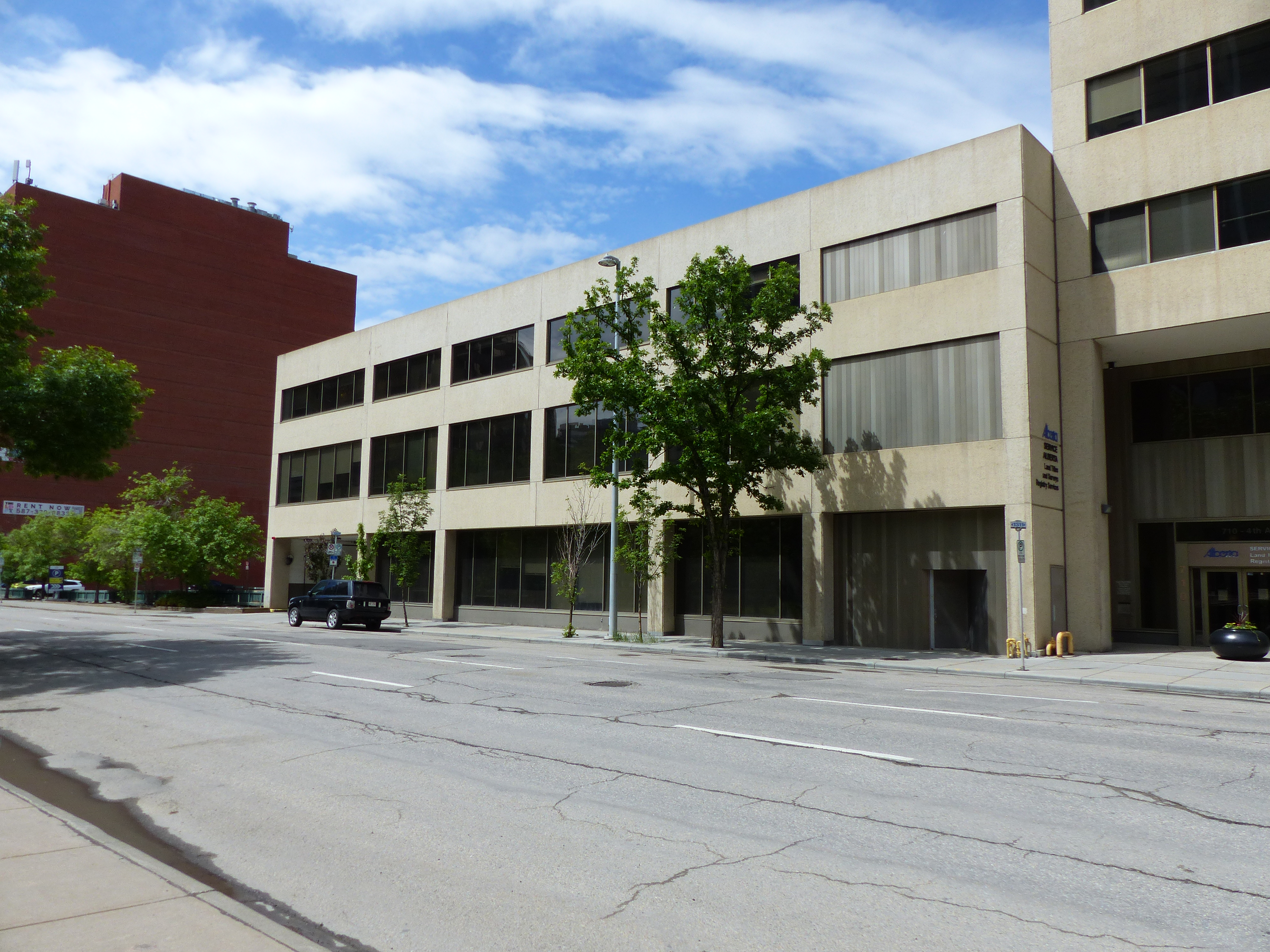
400 Club

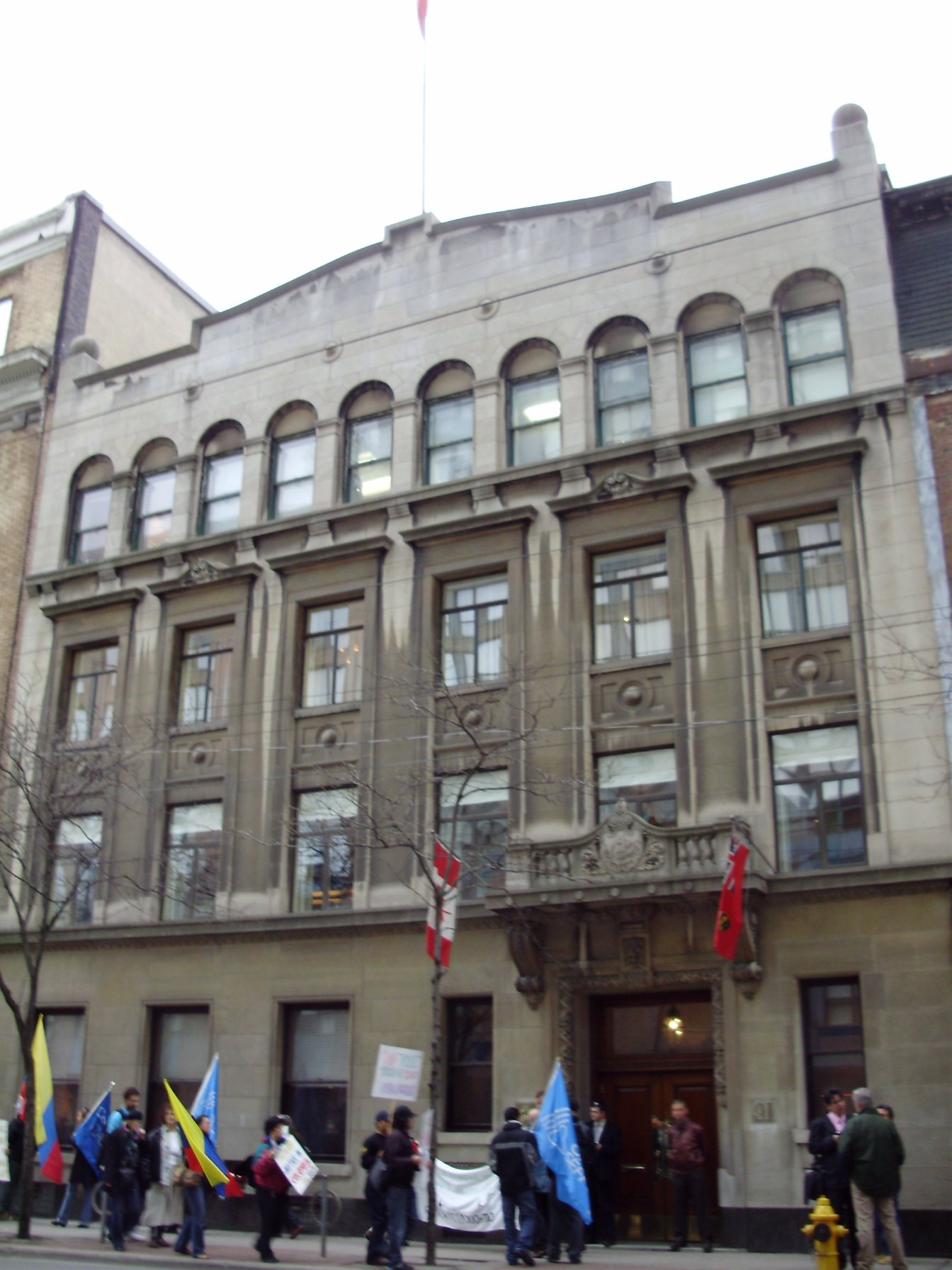
Albany Club

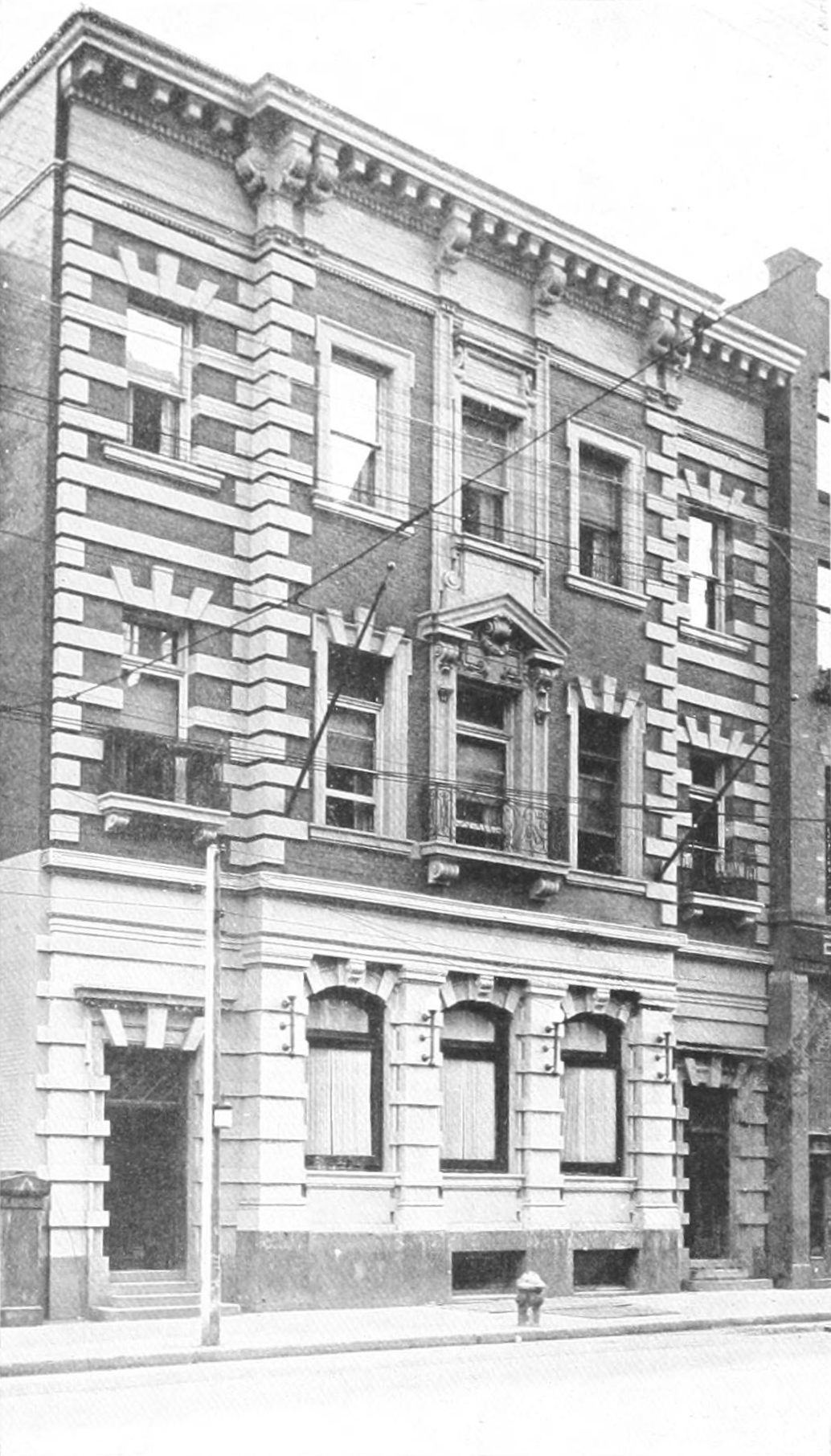
American Club of Toronto

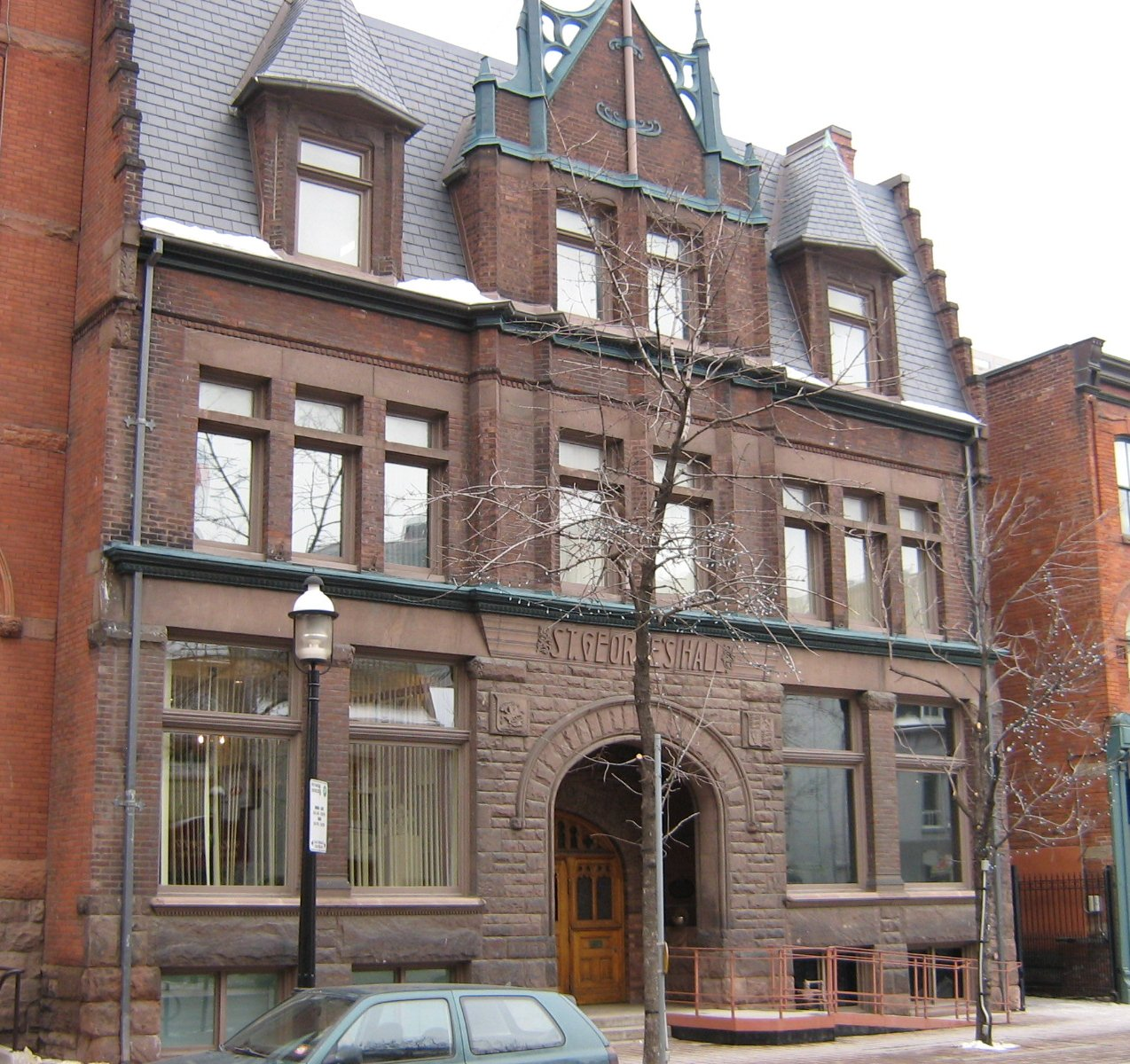
Arts and Letters Club of Toronto

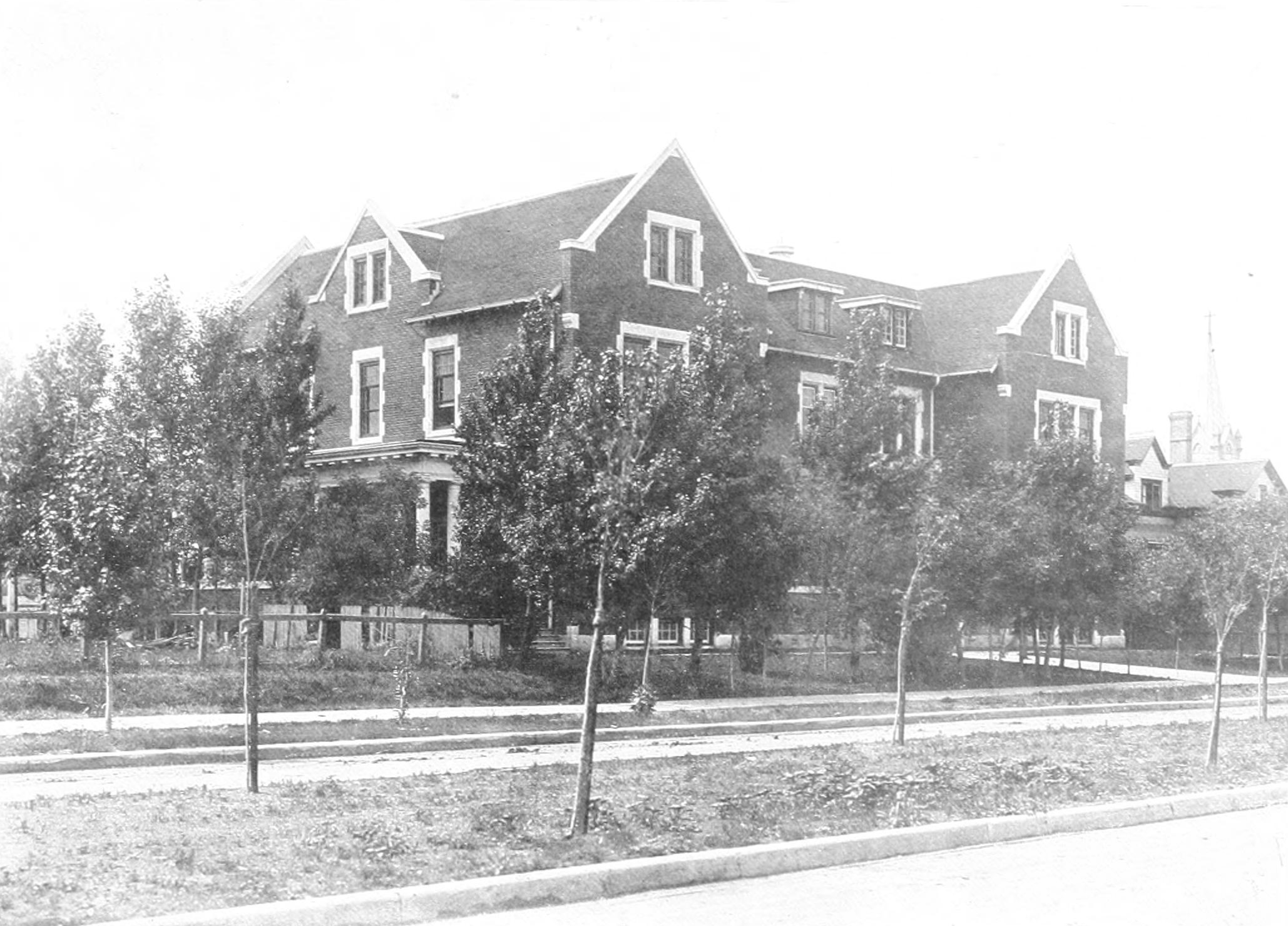
Assiniboia Club

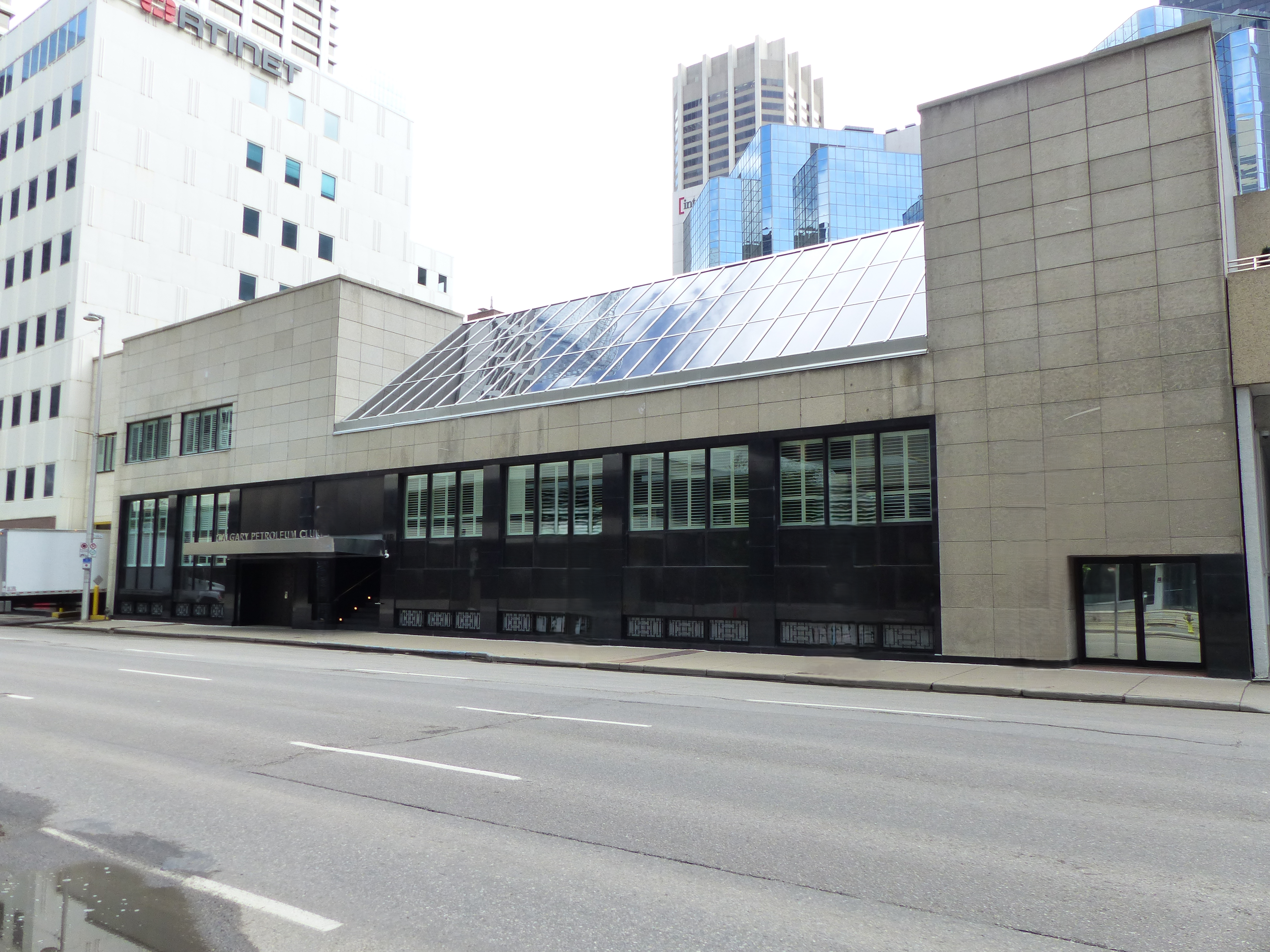
Calgary Petroleum Club

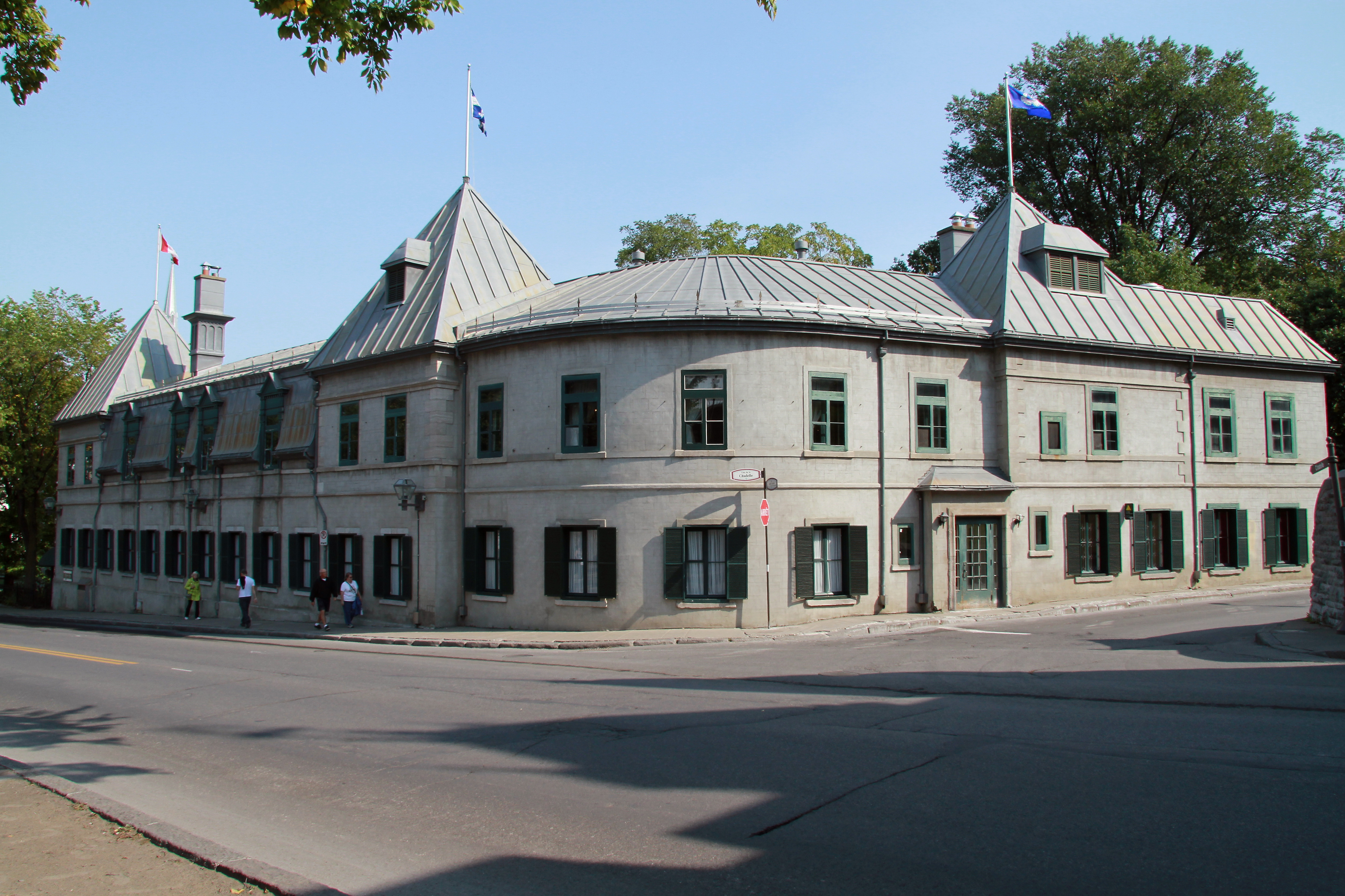
Garrison Club

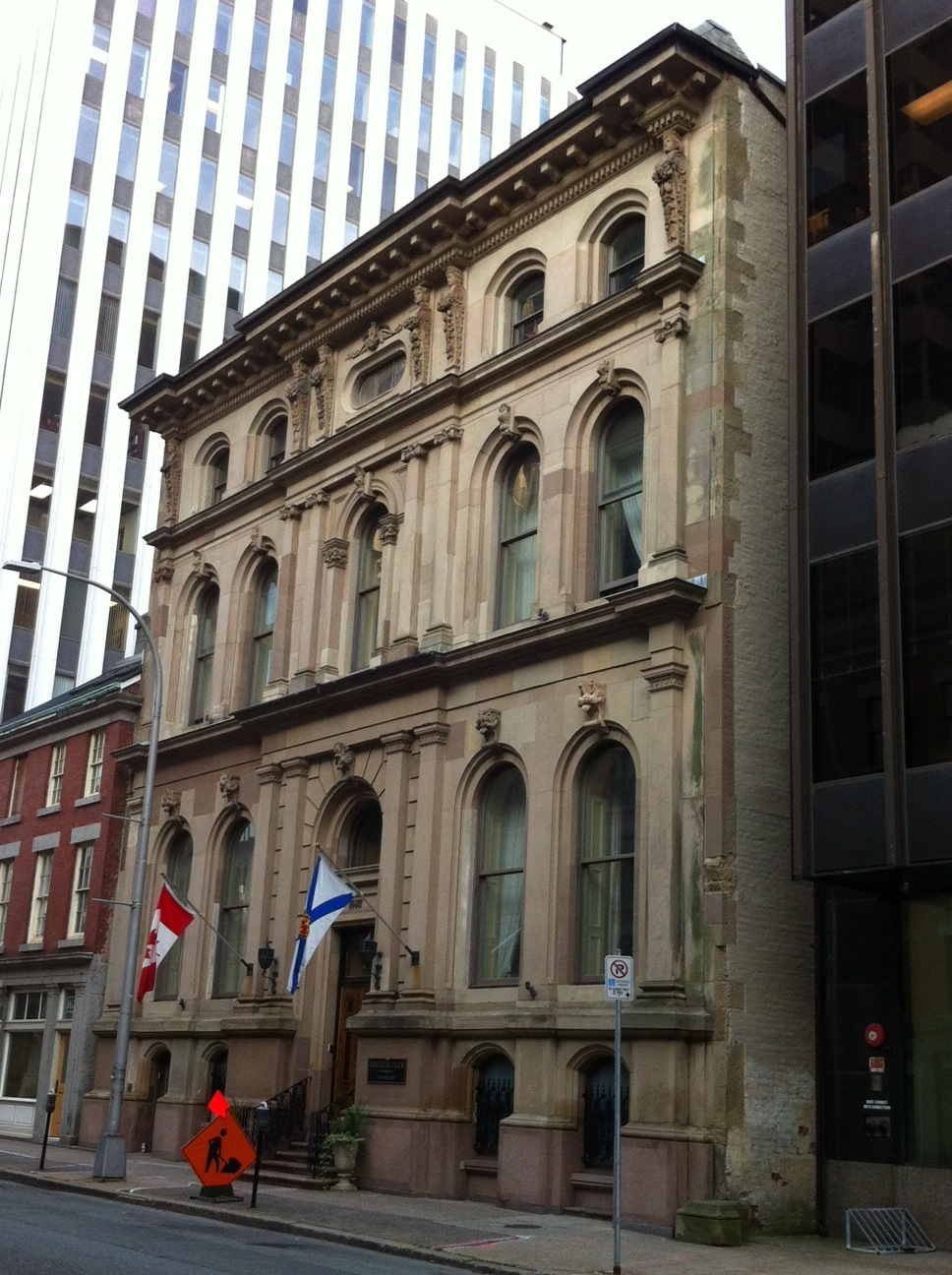
Halifax Club

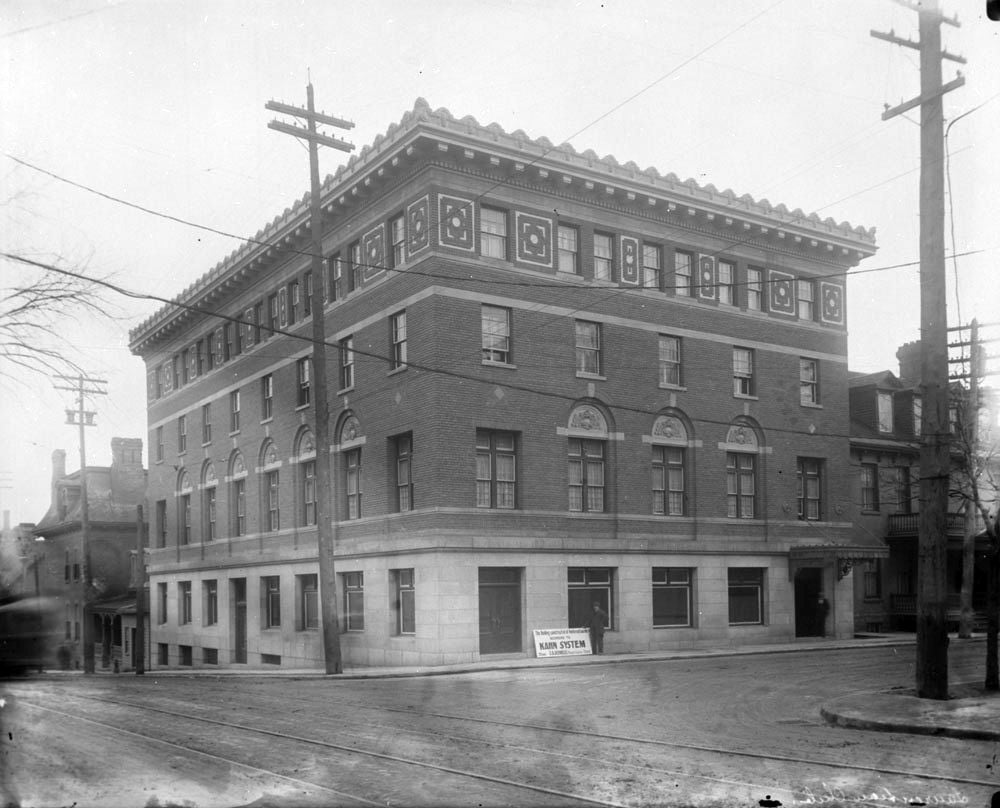
Laurentian Club

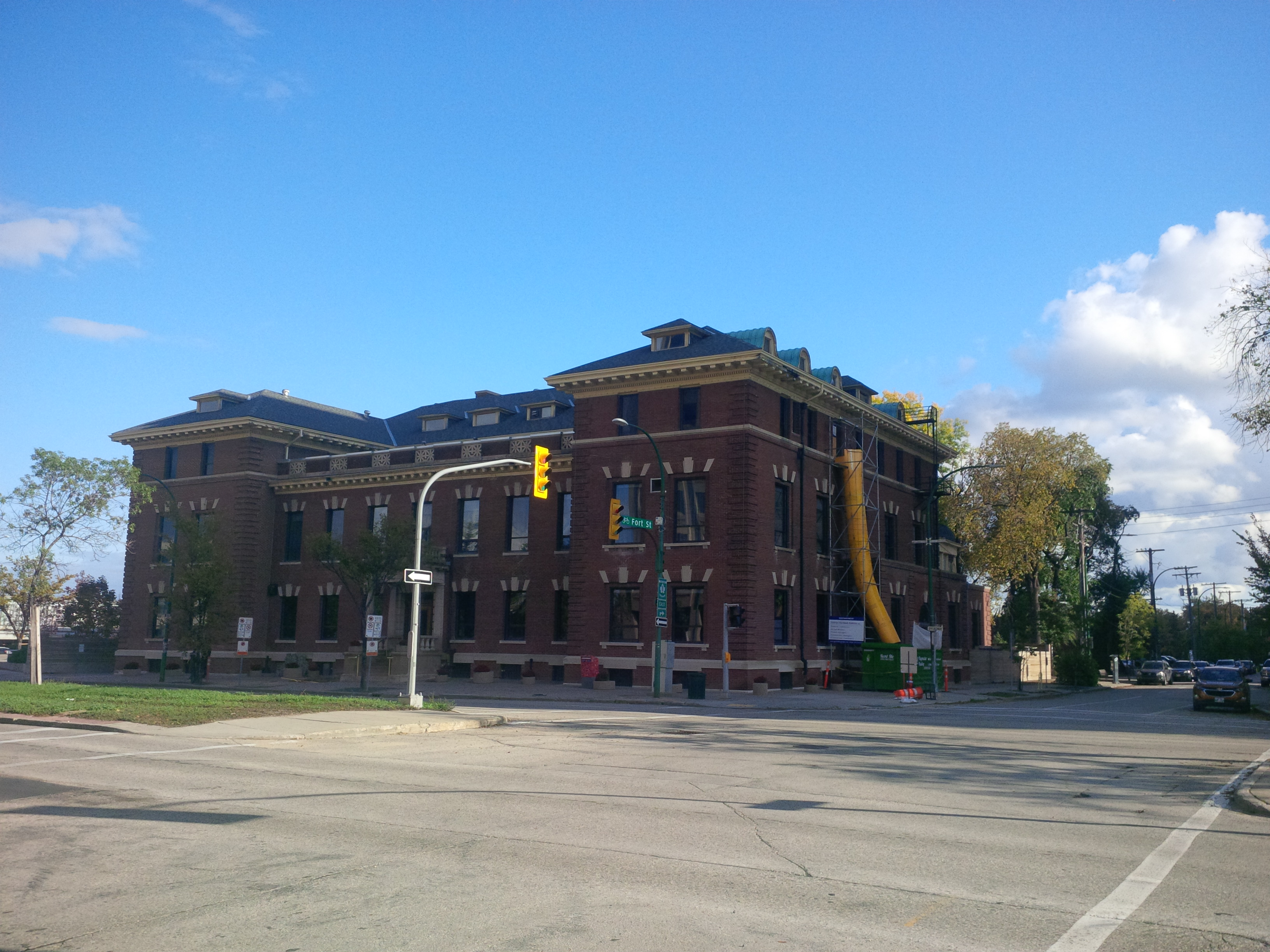
Manitoba Club

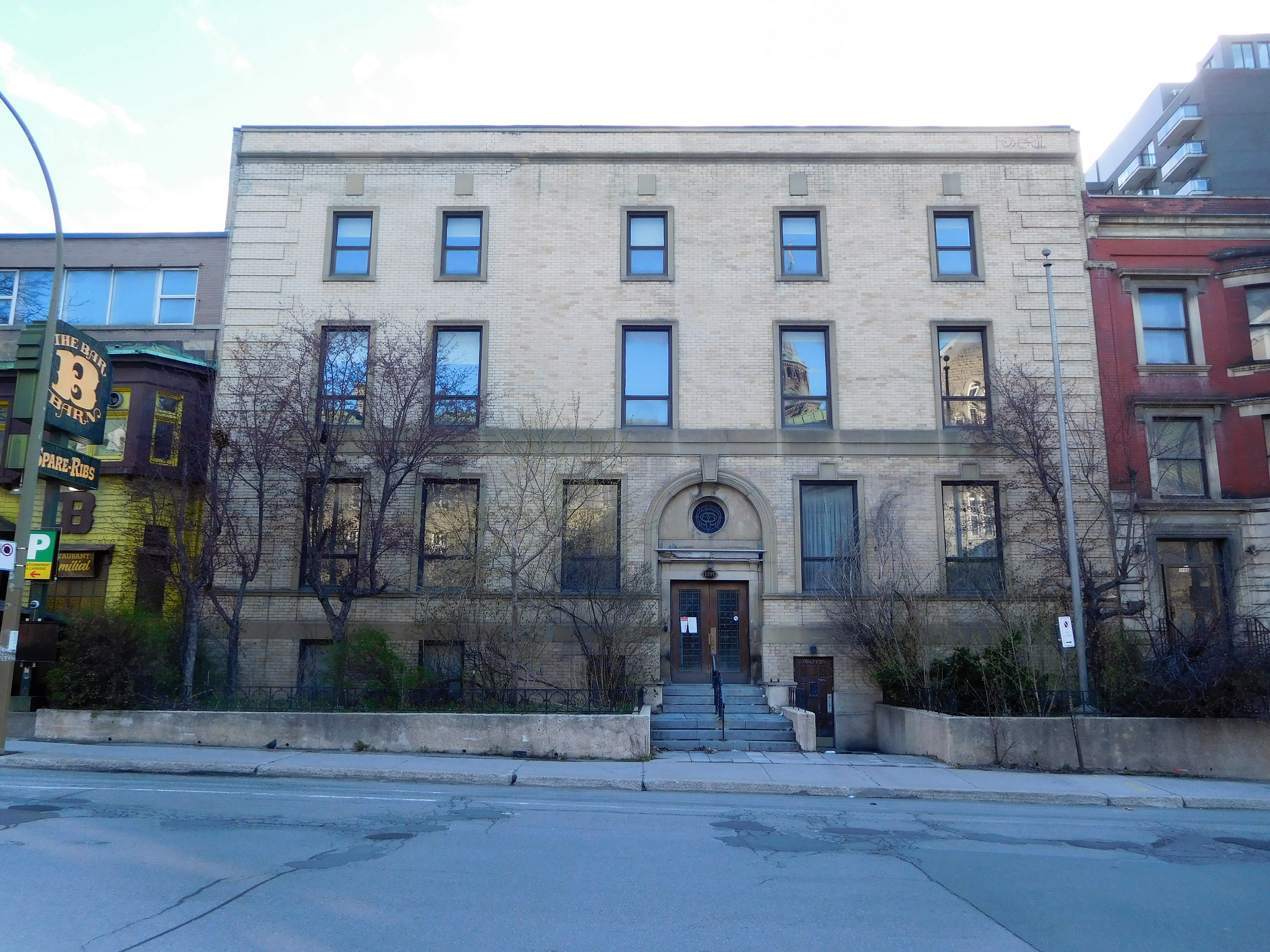
Montefiore Club

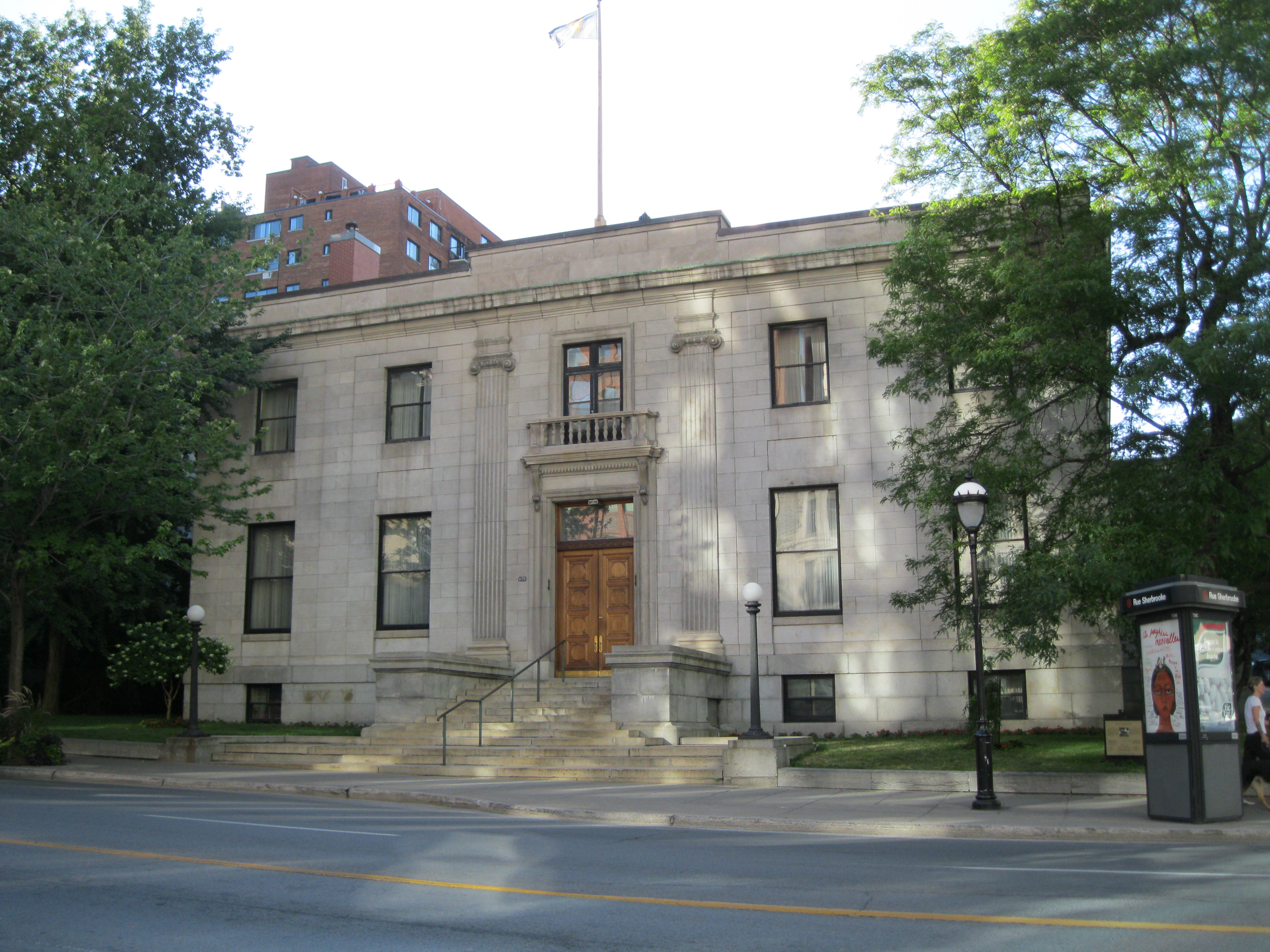
Mount Royal Club

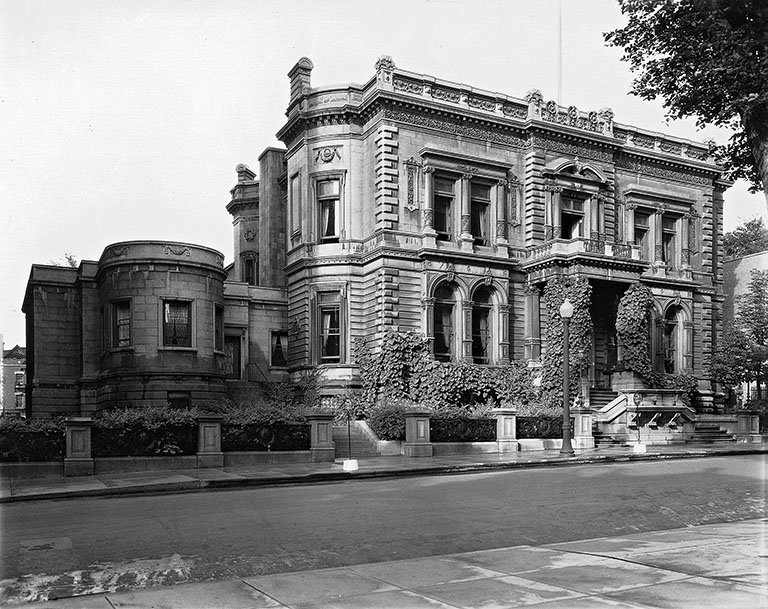
Mount Stephen Club

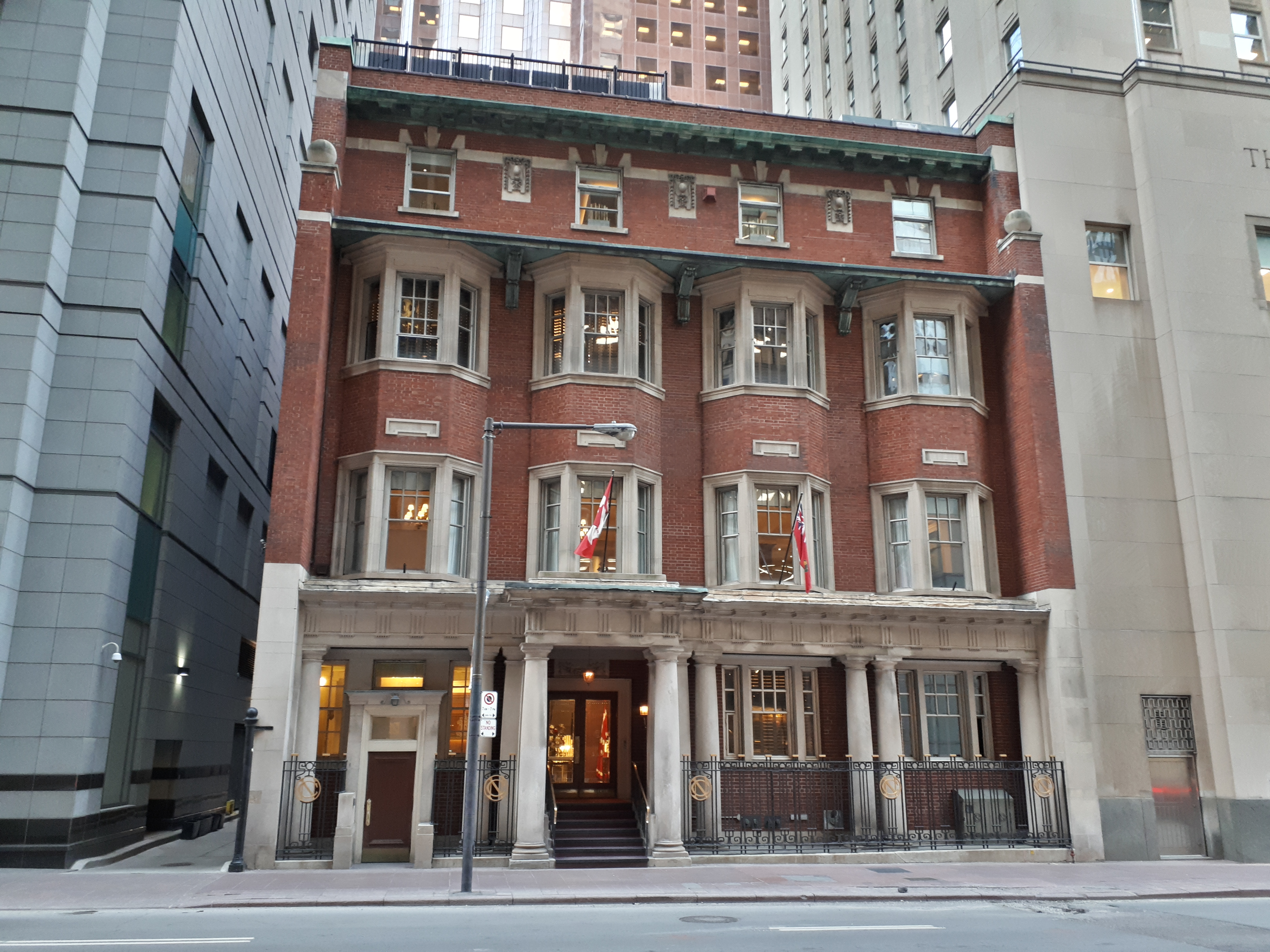
National Club

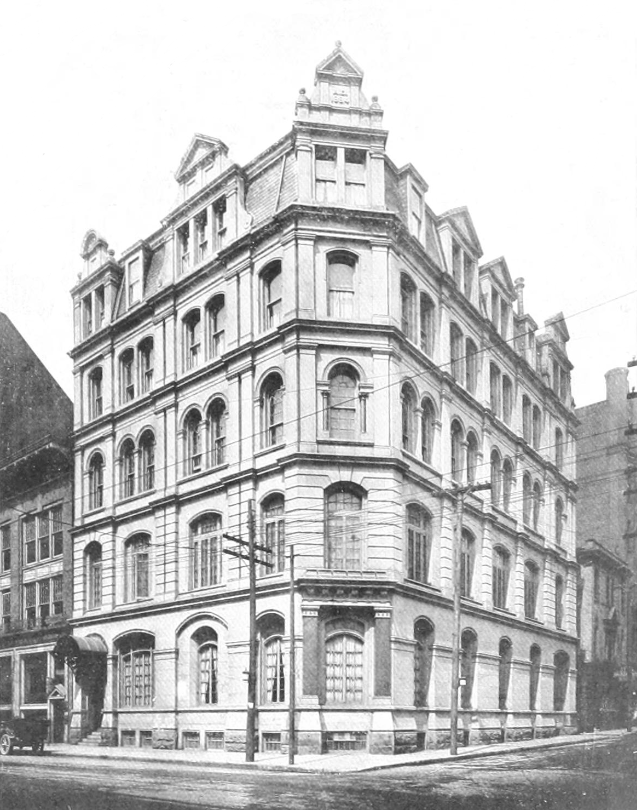
Ontario Club

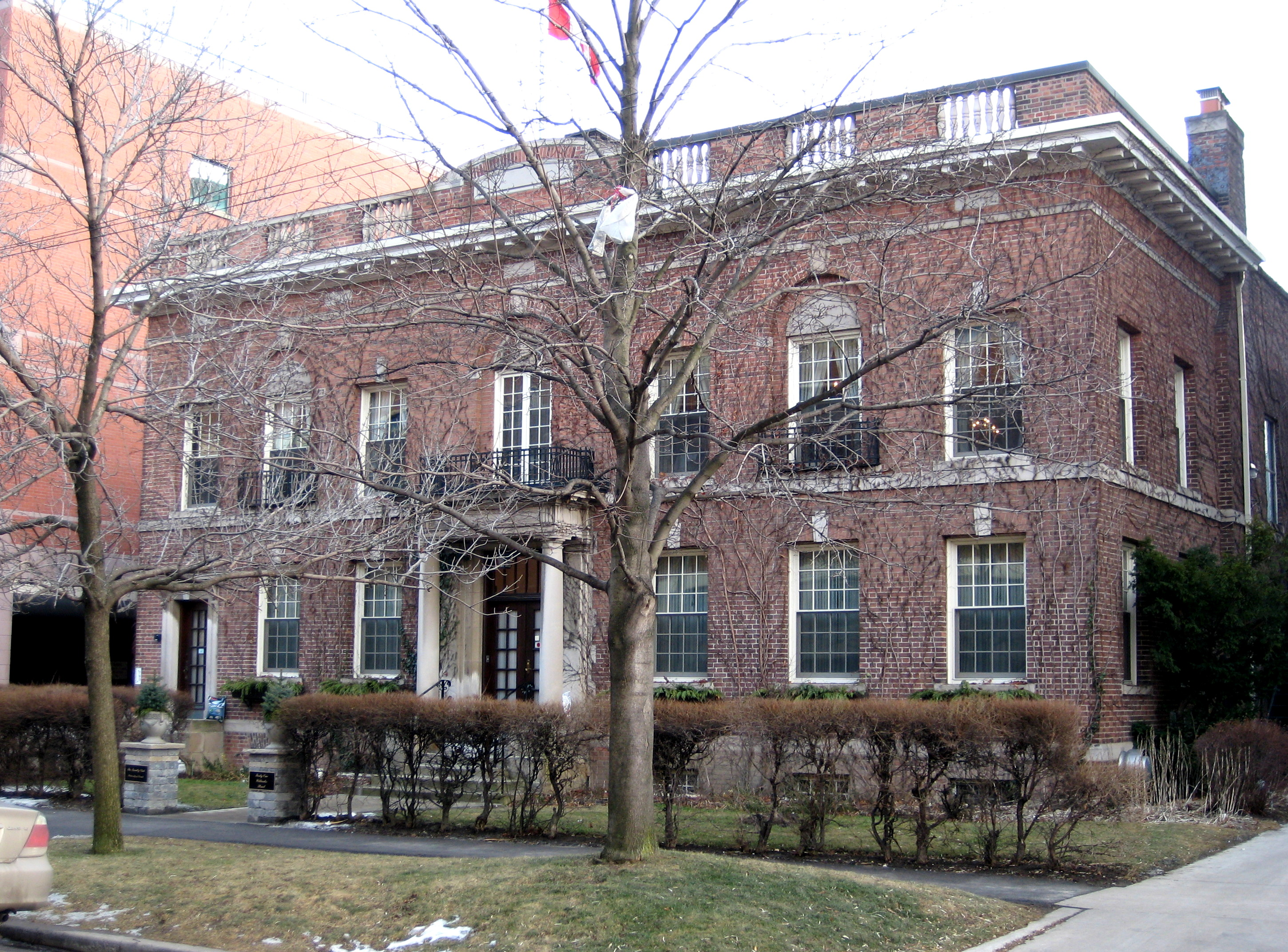
Primrose Club

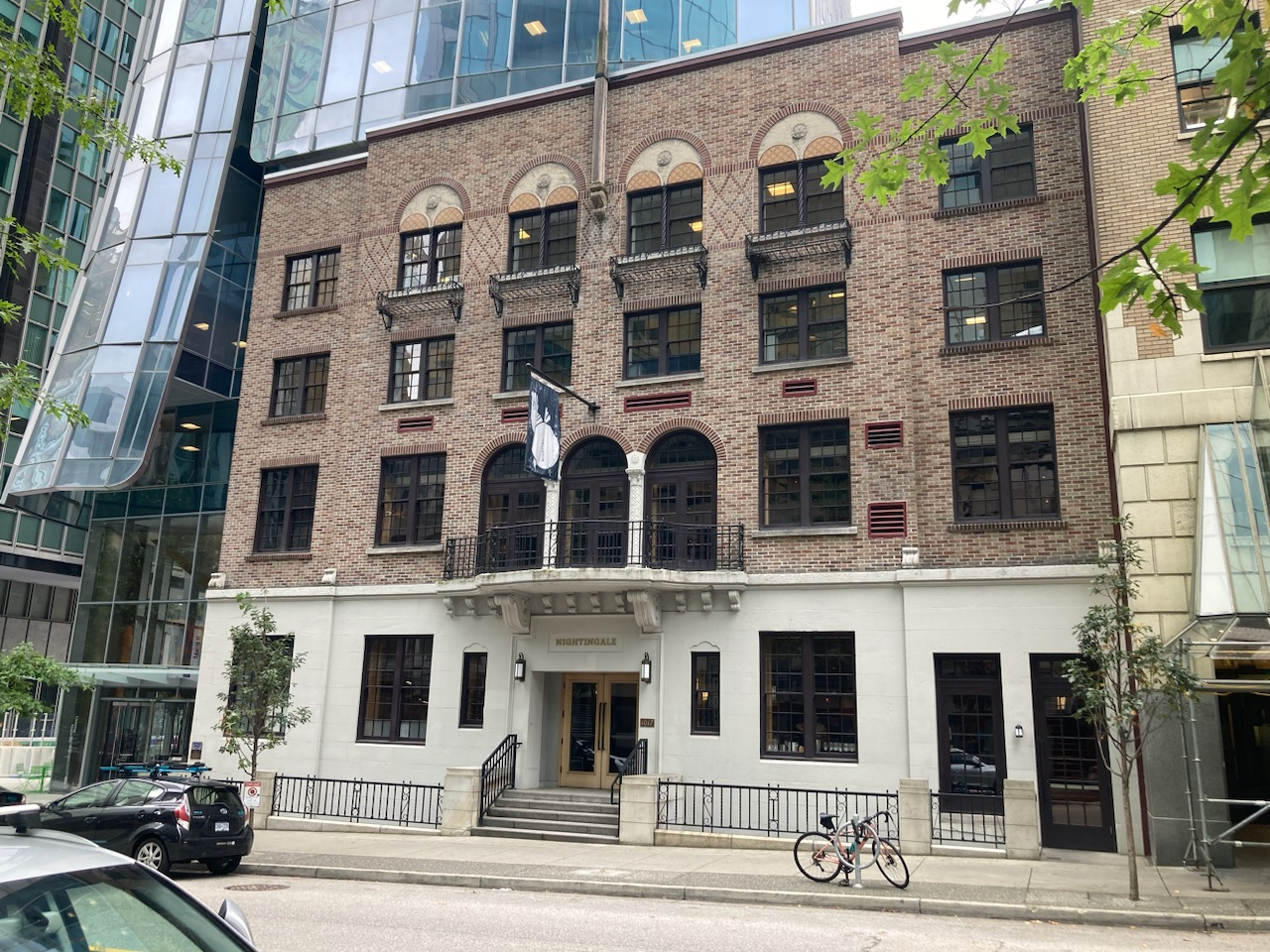
Quadra Club

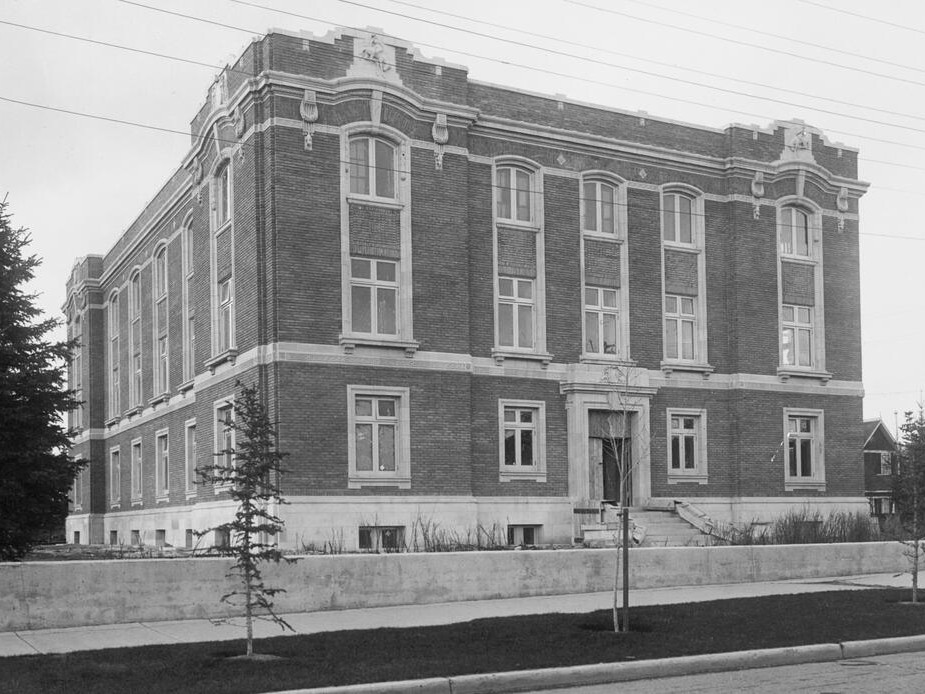
Ranchmen's Club

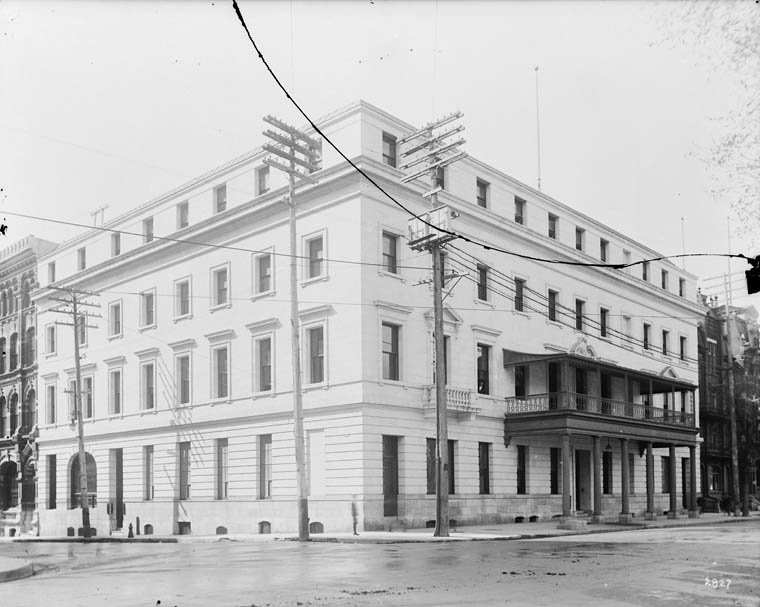
Rideau Club

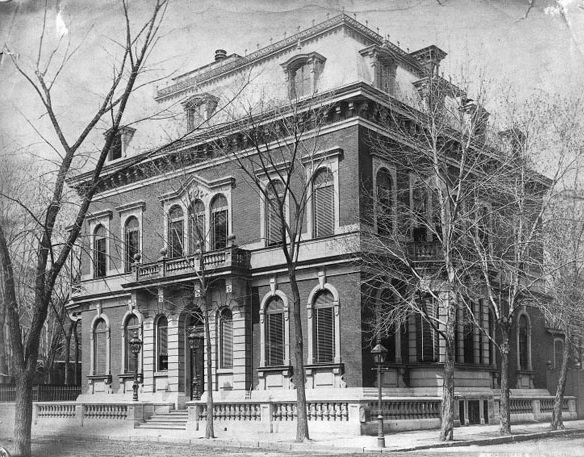
Saint James's Club of Montreal

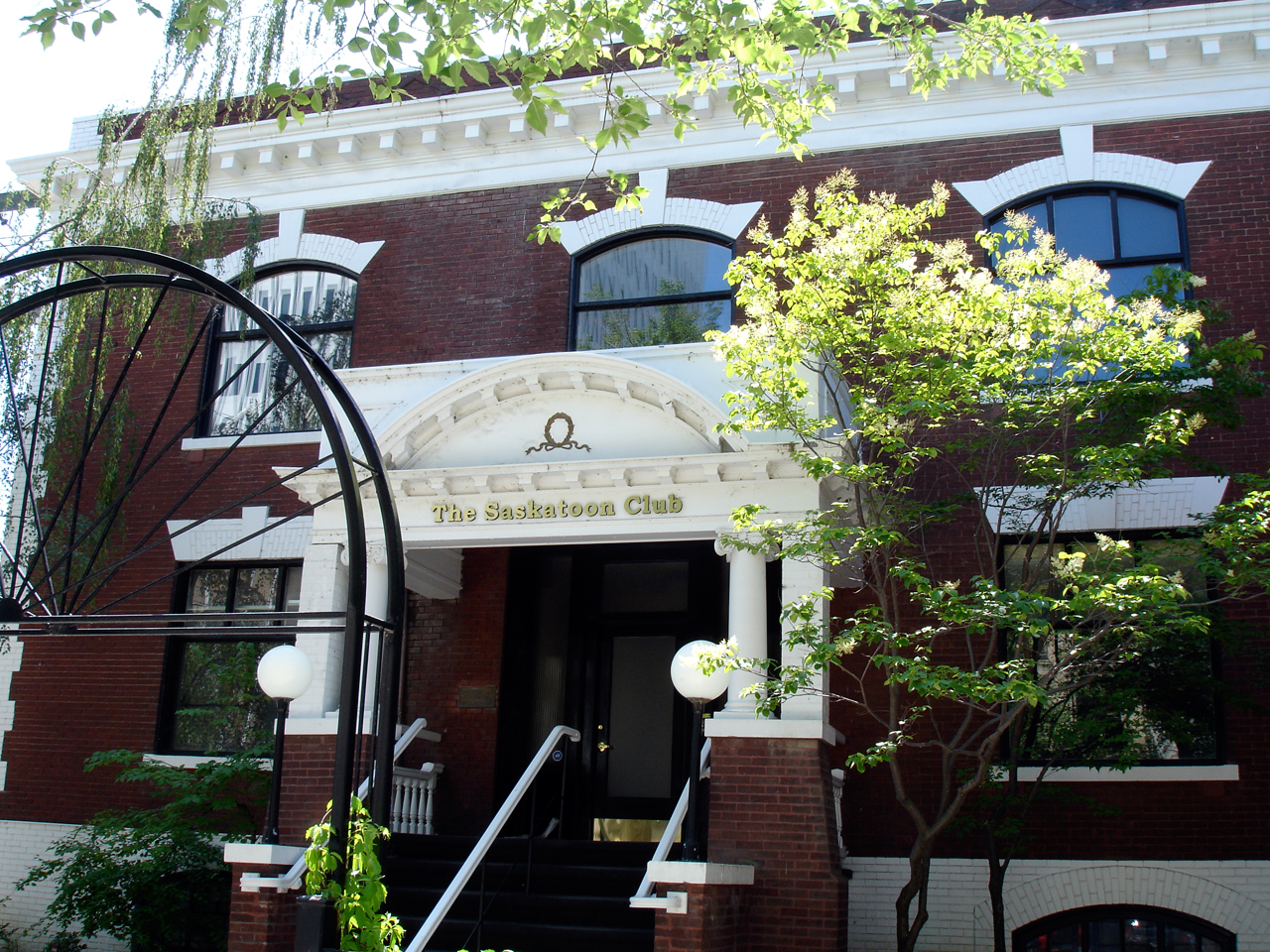
Saskatoon Club

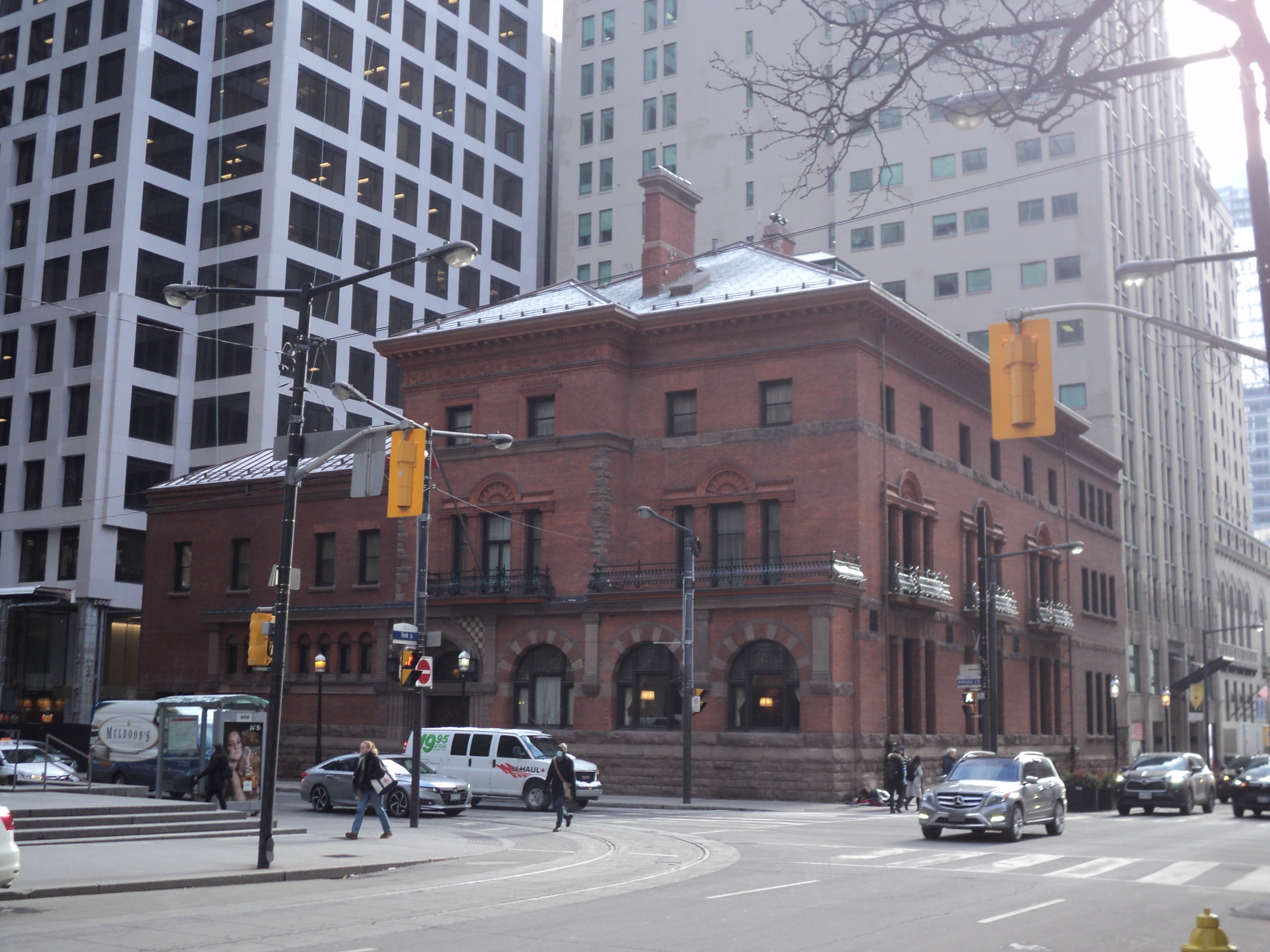
Toronto Club

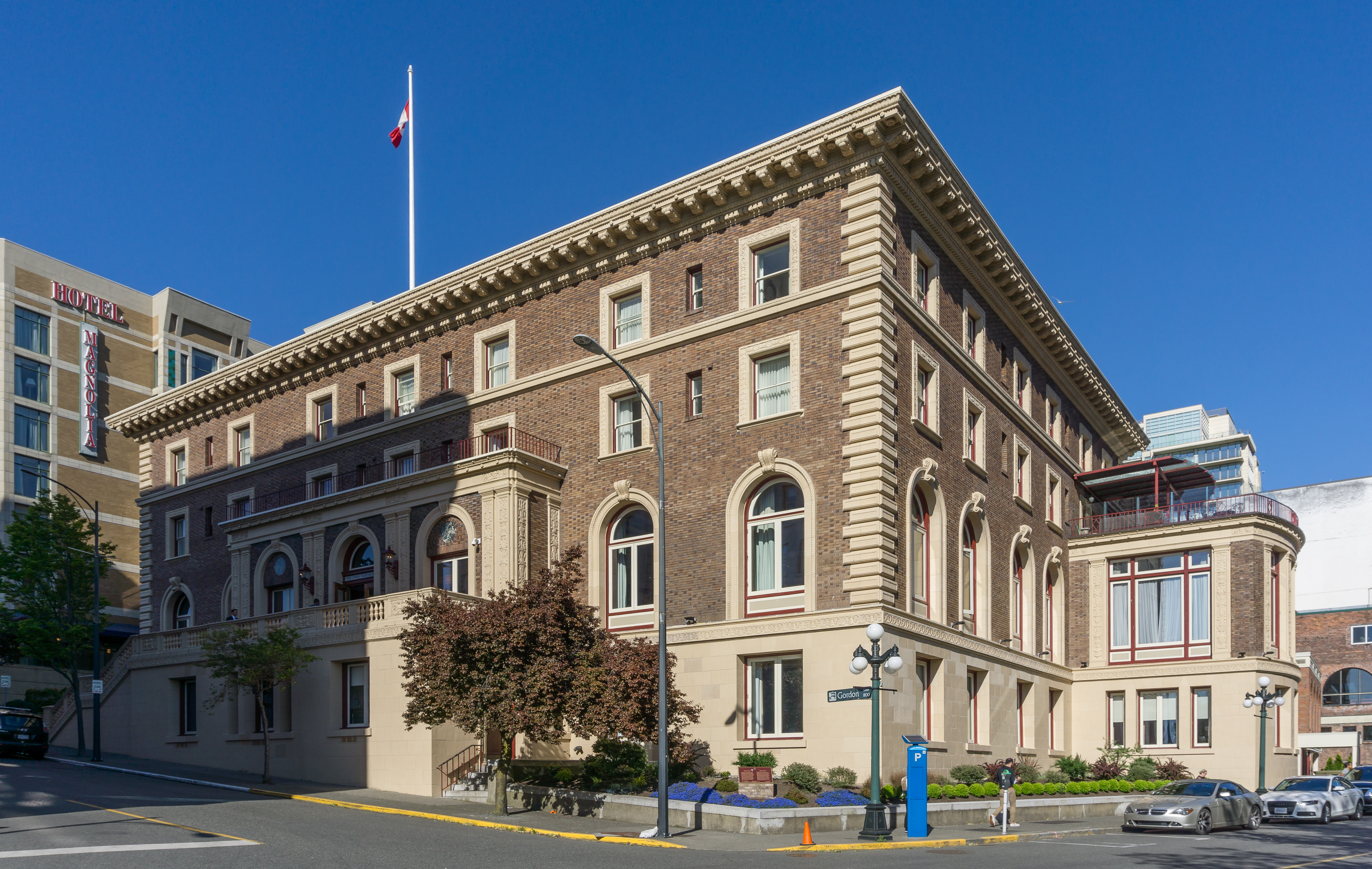
Union Club of British Columbia

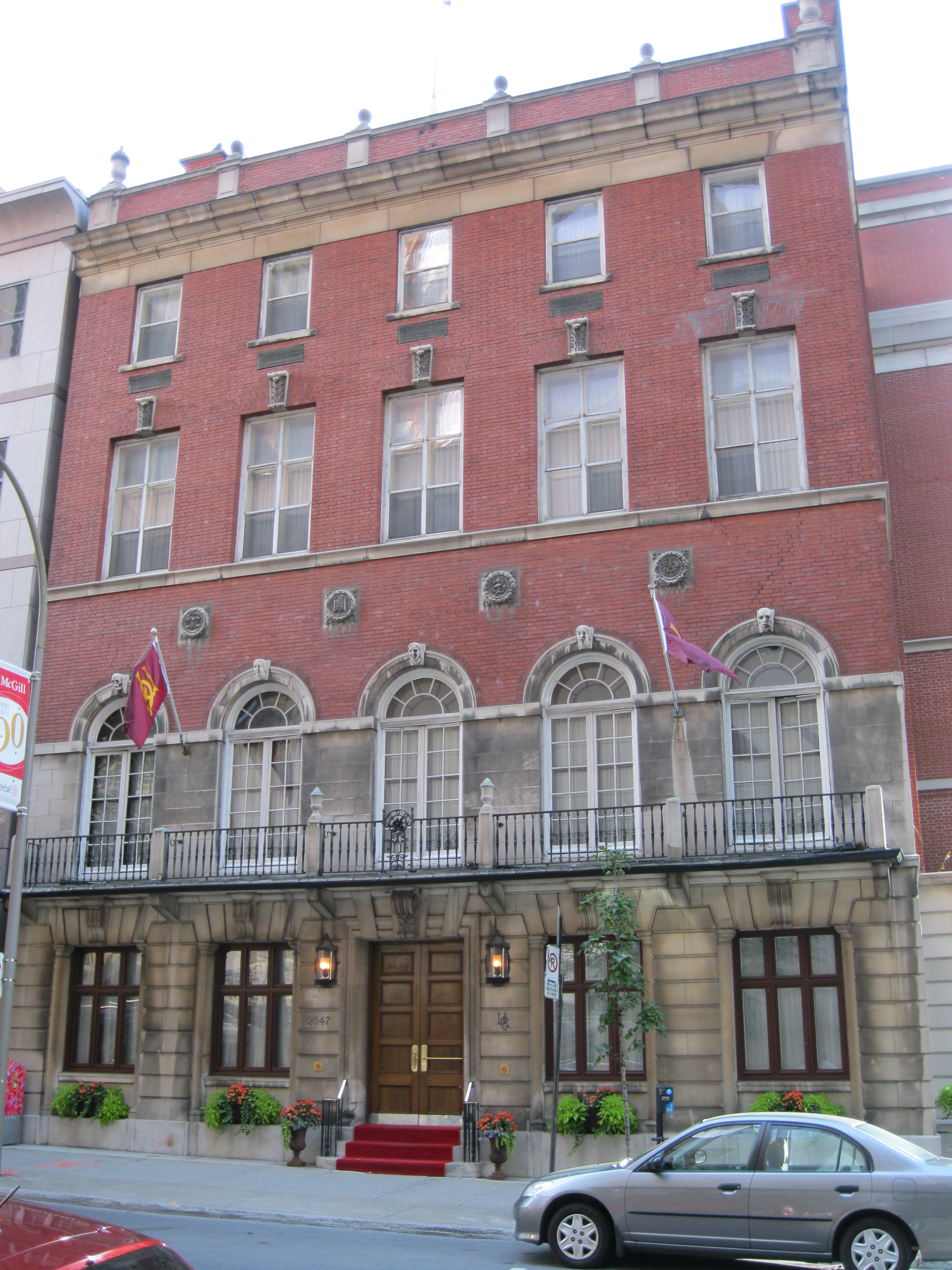
University Club of Montreal

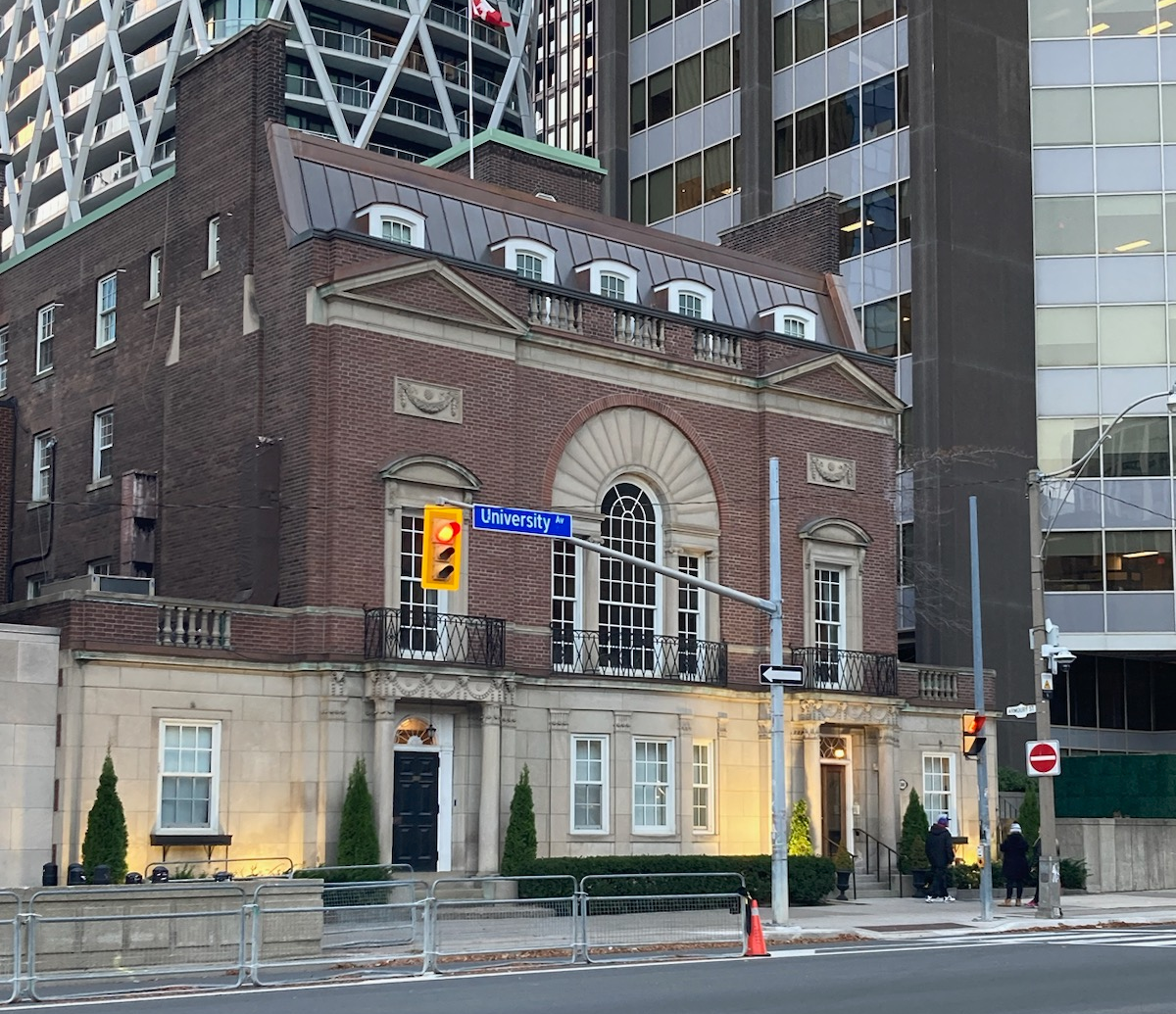
University Club of Toronto

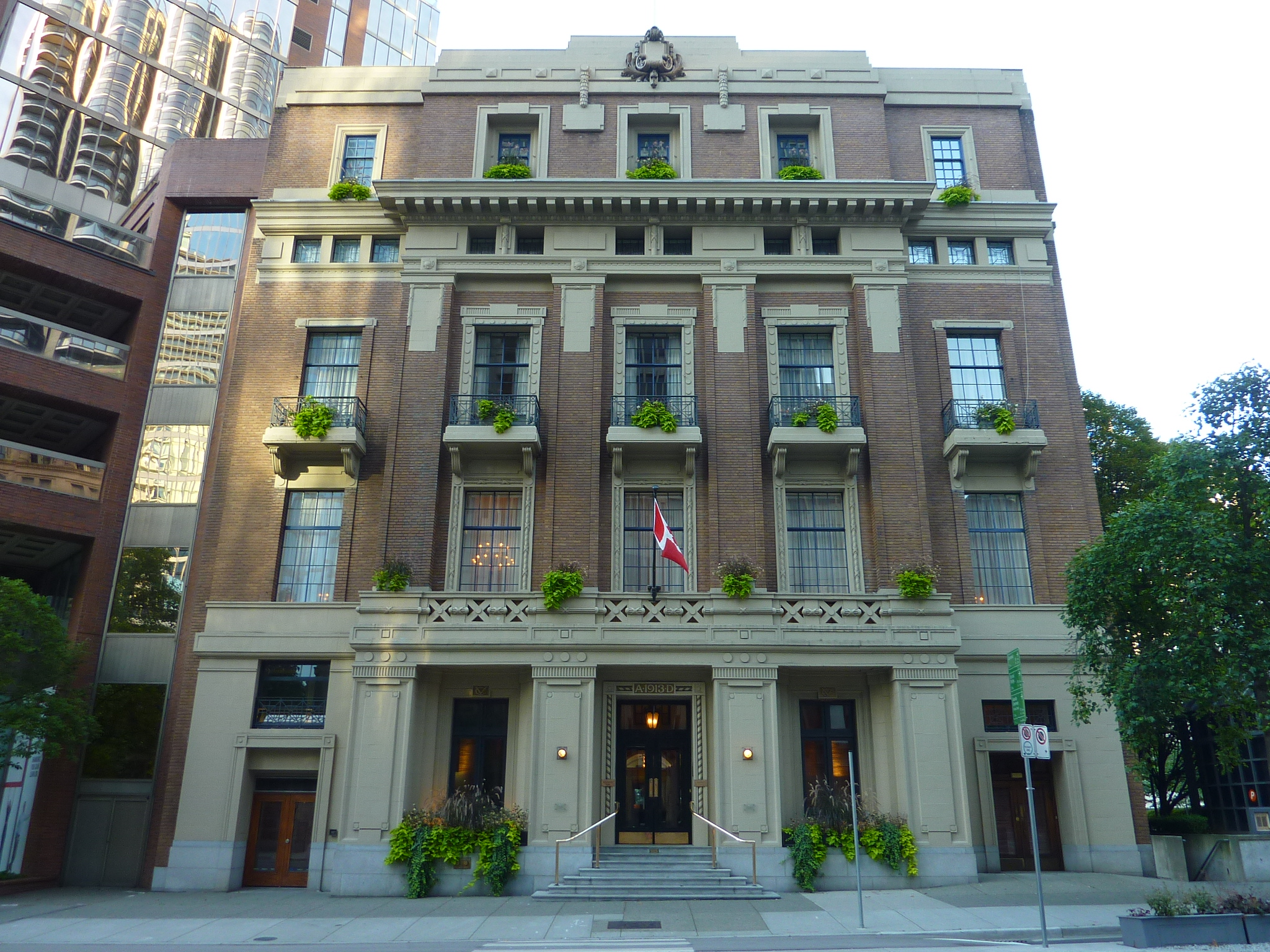
Vancouver Club

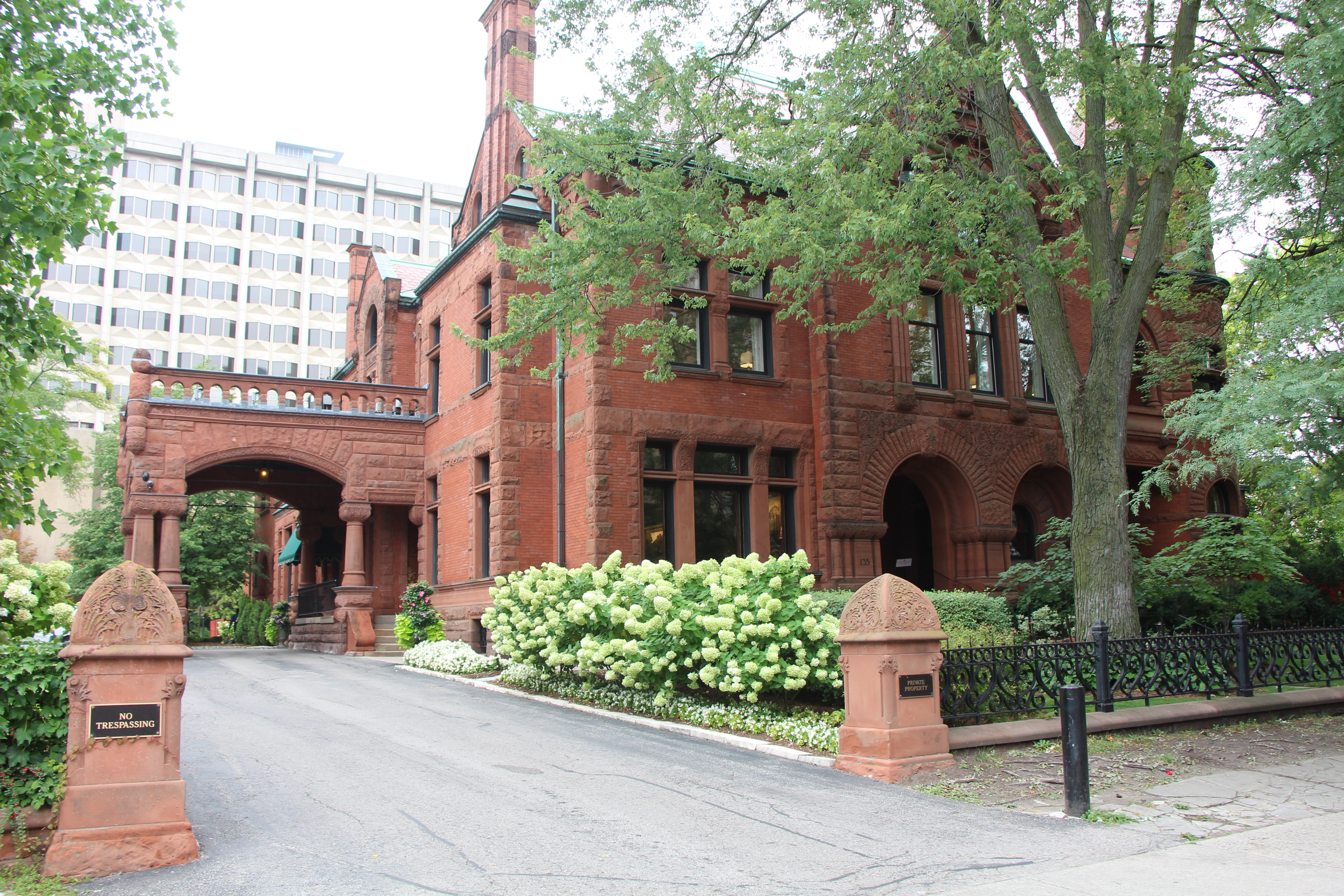
York Club

== See also ==
- Gentlemen's club
- List of gentlemen's clubs in India
- List of gentlemen's clubs in London
- List of gentlemen's clubs in Sri Lanka
- List of gentlemen's clubs in the United States
