= Saint James's Club of Montreal =

Private club in Montreal, Quebec

- Formation: June 30, 1858; 167 years ago
- Headquarters: 1145 Avenue Union
- Website: stjamesclub..ca

The Saint James's Club of Montreal (French: Club Saint-James de Montréal) is a private social club in Montreal, Quebec. The club was founded in 1857 as a gentlemen's club, but since 1979 has been mixed-sex. As with many upper-class Montreal institutions, the Saint James's Club underwent a significant upheaval during the Quiet Revolution of the 1960s and 1970s, when much of the city's Anglo-Scottish establishment relocated to Toronto. In recent decades the club has reinvented itself as a predominantly Francophone institution.

== History ==
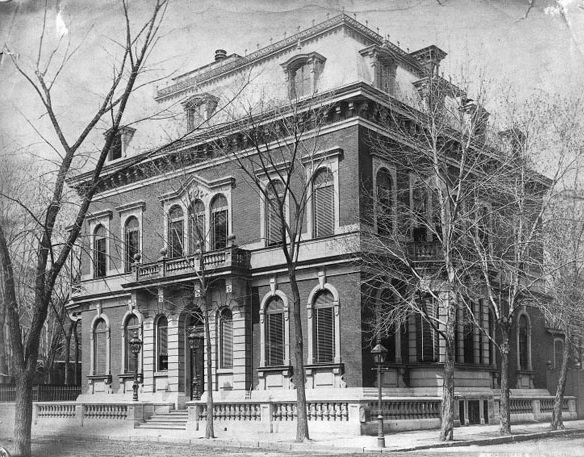
The original clubhouse opened in 1864 at the corner of Dorchester and University. It was demolished in 1961 to make way for Place Ville Marie.

In 1864 the club opened its original clubhouse, designed by John William Hopkins and Frederick Lawford, at the northwest corner of Dorchester Boulevard and University Avenue. The clubhouse was demolished in 1961 to make way for the construction of Place Ville Marie. In 1960 the club partnered with the Yale Building Corporation to construct a combination club and office building, designed by Durnford Bolton Chadwick and Ellwood, at 620 Dorchester Boulevard West. The first three floors were to be occupied by the club while the upper ten storeys were office space. After a 60-year period, title and ownership of the building were to revert to the club.

== Club histories ==
- Collard, Edgar A. The Saint James's Club: The Story of the Beginnings of the Saint James's Club. Gazette Printing, 1957.
- Hudon, François. L'Histoire du Club Saint-James de Montréal/History of the Saint James's Club of Montreal: 1857-1999. Anchor-Harper, 2000.

== See also ==
- List of gentlemen's clubs in Canada
