= Mount Stephen Club =

Gentlemen's club in Montreal, Canada

Coordinates: 45.498997°N 73.575078°W

- Founded: December 12, 1927
- Defunct: 23 December 2011
- Type: Private members' club
- Location(s): 1440 Drummond Street; Montreal, Quebec, Canada

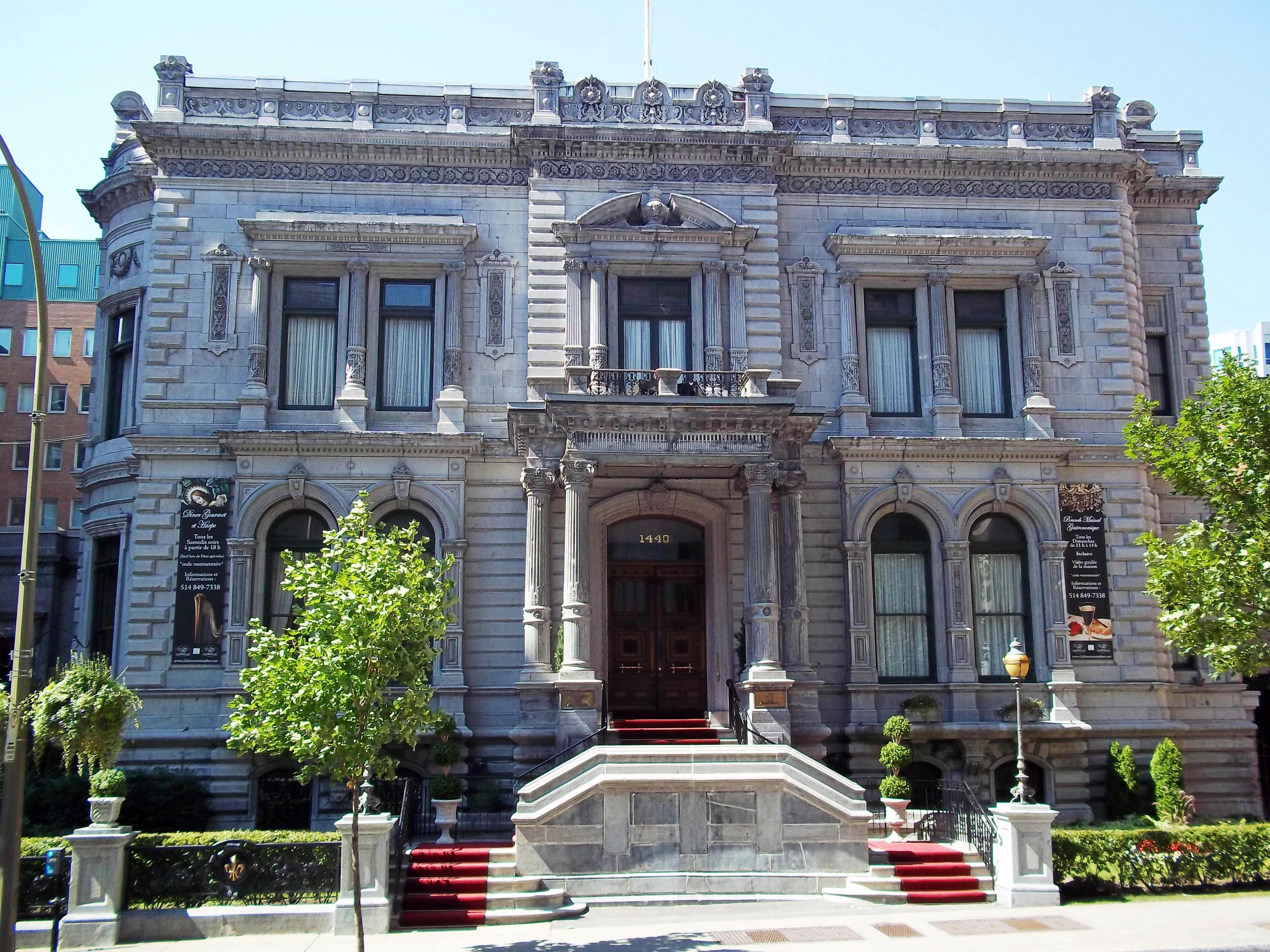
George Stephen House in 2011, the final year of the Mount Stephen Club

The Mount Stephen Club was a private members' club located in the former George Stephen House at 1430-1440 Drummond Street in Montreal (Quebec), Canada.

The club was founded in 1926 as a gentlemen's club for businessmen by mining magnate Noah Timmins, J.H. Maher and J.S. Dohan. It took its name from the mansion's first owner, Lord Mount Stephen, who built the house in 1883 as a family home. The club officially opened to members on December 12, 1927, after adapting the house for its needs. It was then considered to be an exclusive meeting place for wealthy Anglophone Montrealers. Starting in 1964, women visiting the club were allowed to come in by the same entrance as men, but only on Thursdays. During the mid-1970s, women became equal members of the club, which continued until it closed on December 23, 2011.

Various well-known people visited the club over the years, including Princess Margaret, Countess of Snowdon, Princess Benedikte of Denmark, John Diefenbaker, Pierre Trudeau, Brian Mulroney, Percival Molson, Lucien Bouchard, Louise Harel and Edgar Bronfman.

== History ==
On July 16, 1926, Don Mar Realty Limited acquired the George Stephen House. This company then transferred it on October 14, 1927, to the new Mount Stephen Club, a gentlemen's club founded in 1926 by Noah Timmins, J. H. Maher, and J. S. Dohan (Note: Rémillard 1986, p. 109). They were the first advocates for the preservation of the George Stephen House and did everything in their power to protect this elegant townhouse from demolition and to preserve its original interior. They named the club "Mount Stephen" in honor of the residence's first owner, George Stephen. (Note: Pinard 1987, p. 179).

The conversion of the residence into a private club, however, led the new owner to make some modifications to adapt it to its needs. The most notable was the replacement in 1927 of the glass walls of the conservatory with cut stone walls. (Note: Communauté Urbaine de Montréal 1987, p. 674)That same year, the building's new purpose also prompted the club to make changes to the kitchens, some of the equipment, and the basement rooms. On December 12, 1927, the club opened its doors to members.

Subsequently, the club undertook a series of expansions through the construction of annexes and interior modifications to better meet the needs of the club and its clientele. In 1948, the club expanded the south side of the former conservatory (Note: City of Montreal Permits and Inspections Department, Permit no. 2011, 1948-05-07). In 1953, the institution built an annex at the rear and carried out interior modifications from 1956 to 1958 and in 1962 (kitchens). (Note: City of Montreal Permits and Inspections Department, Permit no. 3618, 1953-06-19) (Note: City of Montreal Permits and Inspections Department, Permit no. 4817, 1956-07-06) (Note: City of Montreal Permits and Inspections Department, Permit no. 2622, 1958-06-02) (Note: City of Montreal Permits and Inspections Department, Permit no. 2307, 1962-06-05)

Starting in 1964, women visiting the club were allowed to come in by the same entrance as men, but only on Thursdays. During the mid-1970s, women became equal members of the club.

In 2005, a hotel project emerged: the "Le Cristofe Alexandre" hotel. Designed by architect Karl Fischer, a twenty-one (21) story tower would have been erected at the corner of Drummond Street and De Maisonneuve Boulevard, adjacent to the George Stephen House, but connected to it by a modern shared entrance. The hotel was originally scheduled to open in 2008. However, this project was cancelled.

In 2006, the club is bought by the Tidan hotel and real estate group. On May 26, 2006, this same group purchased the residence for $4 million from the former Club Mount Stephen, which had been incorporated in 1926.[18] This latter legal entity was officially dissolved on June 4, 2010. Starting in 2006, the club's new management attempted to improve the facilities and services offered to its four hundred members. First, it invested nearly $4 million, notably in adding a central air conditioning system, expanding some reception rooms, and adding new meeting rooms. It also attempted to adopt a new marketing strategy to attract young Montrealers to become members. Then, she opened the club to the general public for musical dinners on Saturdays and musical brunches on Sundays. Despite all attempts to revitalize the club, the Tidan group failed to make the institution profitable, even though their past investments had increased revenues. On December 23, 2011, management made the decision to permanently close the club,[3][4] resulting in the loss of 70 full-time and part-time jobs. The club's closure prompted Heritage Montreal to place the George Stephen House under observation on its list of Montreal's endangered landmarks in 2012.

== List of presidents of the club ==
This non-exhaustive list includes the club presidents.

List of presidents of the club
Name	Presidency period
M. K. Pike	From 1927 to 1929
Lt.-Co. H. J. Trihey, K. C.	1930
J. L. Lawson	1931
Wm. Carswell	1932
W. L. Bayer	1933-34
Arthur Surveyer	1935
A. P. Earle	1936
H. G. Hesler	1937
J. Austin Murphy	1938
H. B. Wickes	1939
A. L. Brown	1940
H. F. Glass	1941
L. A. Daigle	1942
C. M. Carmichael	1943
M. A. Janin	1944
J. P. Kavanagh	1945
A. F. McLachlin	1946
H. R. Churchill	1947
Hon. W. Gagnon	1948
J. H. Davey	1949
L. H. Laffoley	1950
C. T. Medlar	1951
J. C. Kenkel	1952
H. W. Tritt	1953
J. A. Savoy	1954
W. H. Wilson	1955
James Fergus	1956
A. Samoisette, O.B.E.	1957
J. M. Dowie	1958
A. G. Pinard	1959
G. W. Kindersley	1960
W. Howard Wert	1961
G. E. Hervey	1962
A. G. Farquharson	1963
J. C. Clapinson	1964
W. D. Ardell	1965
J. W. Bedbrooke	1966
T. D. Jotcham	1967
M. J. Bourgault	1968
Maurice Riel	1969
J. E. King	1970
R. F. Powell	1971
J. K. Cullen	1972
C. A. Phelan	1973
J. R. Brabant	1974
H. T. Olivier	1975
J. G. McCarten	1976
N. W. Benson	1977
G. M. Simpson	1978
J. K. Cullen	1978

== List of affiliated clubs ==
This list indicates the clubs that were affiliated with the Mount Stephen club around 1967

List of affiliated clubs
Name	Address
Halifax Club	Hollis Street, Halifax, Nova Scotia
Union Club	St. John, New Brunswick
Club Garrison	P.O. Box 300, Quebec City, Quebec
Laurentian Club	252 Metcalfe Street, Ottawa, Ontario
Ontario Club	16 Wellington Avenue, Toronto, Ontario
London Club Ltd.	London, Ontario
Carleton Club	Winnipeg, Manitoba
Assiniboia Club	1925 Victoria Ave, Regina, Saskatchewan
Calgary Petroleum Club	319 5th Ave South-West, Calgary, Alberta
Calgary Professional Club	321, 8th Ave South-West, Calgary, Alberta
Edmonton Club	10020, 100th Street, Edmonton, Alberta
Terminal City Club	837 Hastings Street West, Vancouver, British Columbia
Washington Athletic Club	Seattle, Washington, United States
Olympic Club	524 Post Street, San Francisco, California, 94102
Lotos Club	5, 66th Street East, New York, 10021, New York, United States
Los Angeles Athletic Club	431, 7th Street East, Los Angeles, Californie, 90014, United States
Arctic Club	700, 3rd Ave, Seattle, Washington State, United States
Denver Athletic Club	P.O. Box 988, Denver, Colorado, 80201, United States
Columbia University Club	4, 43rd Street West, New York, New York, United States
Davenport Club	Davenport, Iowa, United States
Downtown Athletic Club	19th Street West, New York, 10004, New York, United States
Wisconsin Club	Milwaukee, Wisconsin, 53233, United States

== See also ==
- List of gentlemen's clubs in Canada

== Sources ==
=== Works / Books ===
- Communauté Urbaine de Montréal (1987). Répertoire d'architecture traditionnelle sur le territoire de la Communauté Urbaine de Montréal : Les résidences (in French). Vol. 1. Montreal, Quebec: Service de la planification du territoire (CUM). ISBN 2-920295-56-X. CUM.
- Rémillard, François (1986). Demeures bourgeoises de Montréal : le Mille carré, 1850-1930 : Maison Hugh-Allan (in French). Montreal, Quebec: Édition du Méridien. pp. 55–57. ISBN 2-920417-08-8. Rémillard-1986.
- Pinard, Guy (1987). Montréal, son histoire, son architecture : Ravenscrag (in French). Vol. 2. Montreal, Quebec: Éditions La presse. ISBN 2-89043-255-6. Pinard-1987.
- The story of the Mount Stephen Club, Montreal, Canada. Montreal, Quebec: Mount Stephen Club, Montreal. 1967. MSC-1967.

=== Newspaper articles ===
- "Quebec Companies Granted Charters. Mount Stephen Club". The Montreal Daily Star (Newspaper). Vol. 59, no. 1 (Graham & Co., proprietors, 1881-1951 ed.). Montreal (QC), Canada. January 3, 1927. p. 8.
- "To Open in November. Mount Stephen Club Now Undergoing Alteration". The Gazette (Newspaper). Vol. 156, no. 163. Montreal (QC), Canada. July 7, 1927. p. 14.
- "Famous Mansion is Reopened as Mount Stephen Club". The Montreal Daily Star (Newspaper). Vol. 59, no. 290 (Graham & Co., proprietors, 1881-1951 ed.). Montreal (QC), Canada. December 7, 1927. p. 8.
- Daniel Lemay (January 8, 2010). "Les clubs privés s'adaptent au siècle". La presse (Newspaper) (in French). Montreal (QC), Canada.
- "Le Mount Stephen Club ferme après 85 ans". Argent (Newspaper) (in French). Montreal (QC), Canada. December 23, 2011.
- "Le Club Mount Stephen deviendra un hôtel". Métro (Newspaper) (in French). Montreal (QC), Canada. September 26, 2012.
- "Le Mount Stephen Club ferme ses portes". La presse (Newspaper) (in French). Montreal (QC), Canada. October 18, 2011.

=== Administrative Documents ===
- Registre foncier du Québec : Before July 20, 1999 : lot no. 1525 (Saint-Antoine Ward, City of Montreal). After July 20, 1999 : lot 1338870 (Montreal, Cadaster of Quebec). Long act, land district: "Montréal Ancien": Ministère des Ressources Naturelles et Faune. 1841–2025. RFQ.
- Land Management - Permits (Borough Ville-Marie) : 1440, Drummond Street. Montreal (QC), Canada: City of Montreal. 1926–2026. PermitsMtl.

=== Websites ===
- Commission des lieux et monuments historiques du Canada. "George Stephen House". Historic Places of Canada. Ottawa (ON), Canada.: Lieux patrimoniaux du Canada.
- "The Mount Stephen Club". Mount Stephen Club.
- Tidan Hotel and Real Estate Group. "Le Mount Stephen Hotel". Le Mount Stephen Hotel Official Website. Montréal (QC), Canada.: Le Mount Stephen Hotel.
- "Sites emblématiques menacés". heritagemontreal.org. Montreal (QC), Canada.: Héritage Montréal.
- "Mount Stephen Club and Hotel Complex, Montreal, Quebec, Canada" (PDF). Lemay.qc.ca. Montreal (QC), Canada.: Lemay / Leclerc Architectes.
- "Le Cristofe Alexandre". SkyscraperPage.com. SkyscraperPage.
- "Club Mount Stephen (Constitué en 1926)". Registre des entreprises du Québec en ligne. Quebec City (QC), Canada: Registraire des entreprises.
- Registraire des entreprises. "Club Mount Stephen (Constitué en 1926)". Registre des entreprises du Québec en ligne.
- "Maison George-Stephen". Grand répertoire du patrimoine bâti de Montréal. Montreal City.
- "Mount Stephen Club Building". Répertoire du patrimoine culturel du Québec. Government of Quebec.

=== Notorial Act ===
- Reilly, E. H. (Notary) (October 14, 1927). Notorial Act, registry no. 157679 : "Deed of Sale". Long act, land district: "Montréal Ouest": Registre foncier du Québec. AN-157679.
