= Quadra Club =

Gentlemen's club in Vancouver, Canada

- Formation: 23 December 1922
- Dissolved: January 1940
- Headquarters: 1017 W Hastings St

The Quadra Club was a gentlemen's club in Vancouver, British Columbia that existed from 1922 to 1940. Named after Juan Francisco de la Bodega y Quadra, the club was an important social institution in Vancouver during the 1920s and 1930s and counted many of the city's élite among its members. For its first several years, the club occupied the former clubhouse of the Vancouver Club. In 1930 it opened a new clubhouse on Hastings Street where it remained for the duration of its existence. During the Great Depression, the club struggled financially and eventually ceased operations in 1940.

In 1941 the Quadra reopened at a new location on Seymour Street in the form of a private tavern rather than a traditional gentlemen's club. During the 1950s the club began featuring music, and in 1965 became a public cabaret. The club moved in 1973 to Homer Street, its third and final location. The Quadra name died in 1984 when new owners bought the business and renamed the club. The Homer Street location remained a music venue under several different names until it closed in 2002 and was demolished the following year.

== Gentlemen's club, 1922–1940 ==
The Quadra Club was formed as the Union Club of Vancouver. The club was incorporated on 23 December 1922 under the Societies Act under certificate number 1117. The club was formed through the merger of the Western Club and a faction of members from the University Club of Vancouver. The Western Club had been founded in 1901, while the University Club had been founded in 1911. The two clubs had been sharing the same building at Dunsmuir and Hornby since 1917, and the merger was a way to resolve the difficulties of sharing the same space. Shortly thereafter, on 7 March 1923, the Union Club changed its name to the Quadra Club. The new name referred to the Spanish naval officer Juan Francisco de la Bodega y Quadra. In 1792, Quadra had met with George Vancouver at Nootka Sound and established cordial relations. The name Quadra thus referred to the spirit of friendship.

At the time the club formed in late 1922, it arranged to lease the former clubhouse of the Vancouver Club. After the Vancouver Club had moved to its new clubhouse in 1914, the old building was rented first to the Seaforth Highlanders, and later to the Great War Veterans' Association. The Quadra took possession in early 1923; its lease was for three years with an option to extend it for another two. On 1 February 1924, the Quadra hosted its first ball. The Quadra ball, which always took place in early February, became a mainstay of the Vancouver social calendar through the 1920s and 1930s.

In June 1927, the club released a proposal to build a new clubhouse. The club had secured an option on a 66' (one chain) wide and 140' deep lot on West Hastings Street (at the time Seaton Street) beside the Marine Building. The lot belonged to the Terminal City Club which had purchased it with the aim of building a new clubhouse, but later made the decision to remain in its current quarters in the Metropolitan Building. To building the clubhouse, the Quadra would form a holding company to finance and building the clubhouse. The estimated total cost for the project was $155,000 (roughly $2.7 million in 2023); the club would secure a $75,000 mortgage at 7 per cent interest, and the remaining $80,000 would be raised via shares and debentures of the holding company.

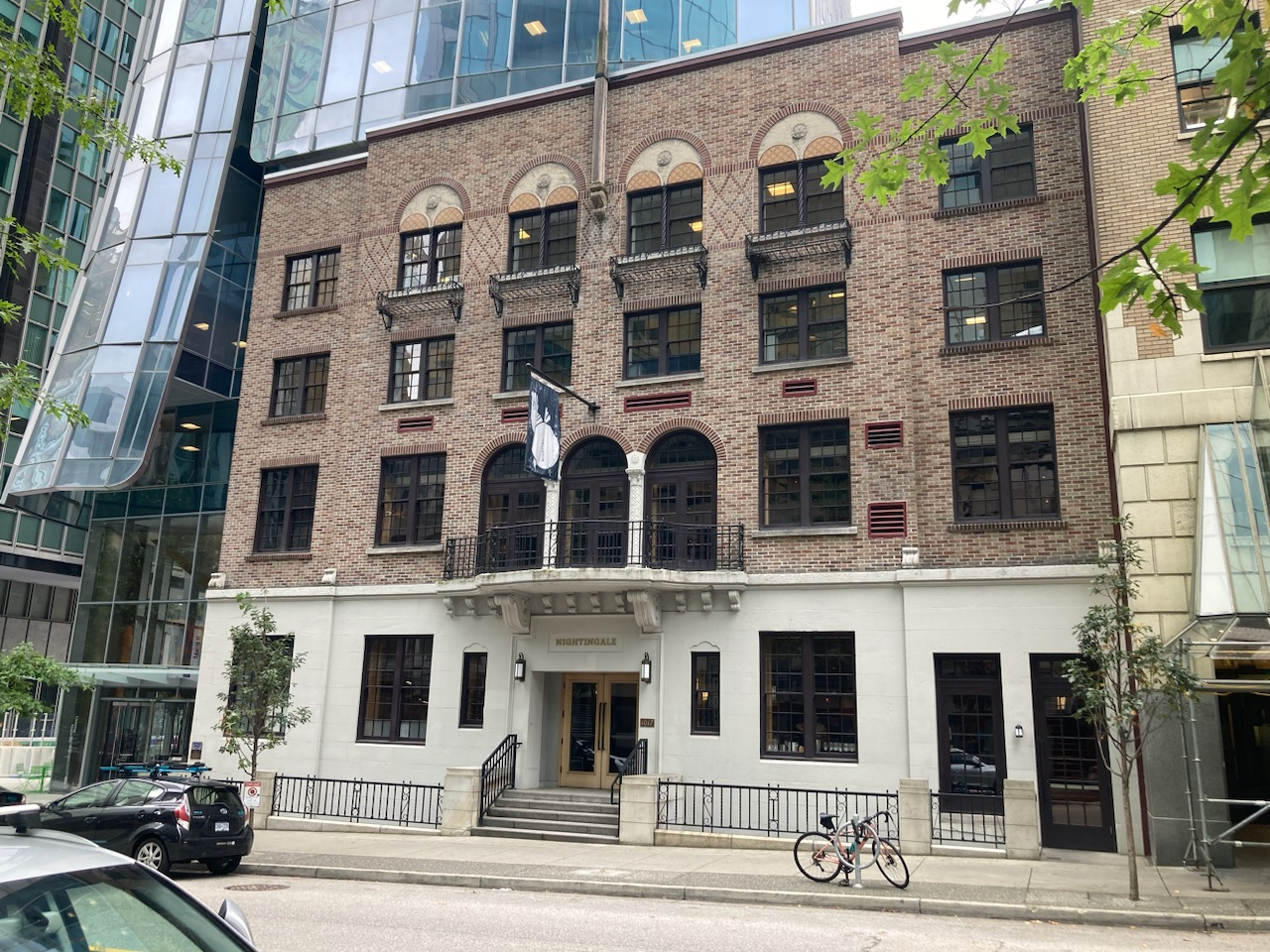
The Spanish Revival clubhouse, designed by Sharp & Thompson, opened in January 1930

The holding company, the Quadra Holding Company, Limited, received its certificate of incorporation on 28 July 1928. The club received its building permit in May 1929. Architects for the new building were Sharp and Thompson. Their design was for a four-story building in the Spanish Colonial Revival style, which reflected the club's Spanish namesake. In the basement was the billiards room and lounge; at the back of the first floor was the reading room; the second floor held the dining rooms and kitchen; and the third and fourth floors held 10 bedrooms each. The new clubhouse opened on Saturday, 11 January 1930. An announcement said, "the reception will be of an informal nature and will take place chiefly in the main dining-room, where tea will be served from large tables, beautifully arranged with the season's flowers." On Valentine's Day 1930, the annual ball took place for the first time in the new clubhouse. The Province wrote, "the Quadra ball is every one of the most important functions of the early New Year, but this season there will be an added lustre to its usual brilliance, for it is taking place in spacious new quarters, and guests will have the added attraction of inspecting the various rooms thrown open for their convenience."

The details are unclear, however, the Quadra Club apparently ran into financial difficulties during the Great Depression. In 1937 the club failed in some fashion, however, an article in December of that year stated that the club had been "newly reorganised." In November 1939, the clubhouse was sold at a tax auction for $10,000, despite an assessed value of $98,960. It is uncertain if the buyer obtained title or if the club freed itself from arrears within the one-year redemption period. Whether or not the club was still open at this time is also unclear. In any case, in February 1940, the Quadra Club vacated its clubhouse, which was taken over by the Loyal Order of Moose No. 888. On 27 January 1940, a notice was given that "unless cause is shown to the contrary," the Quadra Club would be dissolved two months hence.

The Moose remained in the building until 1950, when it was taken over as the headquarters of Vancouver's Royal Canadian Air Force Reserves. In 1957 the reconstituted University Club of Vancouver purchased the building. During the construction of their new quarters in the 1990s, the Terminal City Club occupied it. At present, the former Quadra Club building is home to the restaurant Nightingale.

== Tavern and cabaret, 1941–2003 ==
=== 724 Seymour, 1941–1973 ===
The next news of the Quadra Club came 24 March 1941, when it was announced that the Quadra Club was applying for a liquor license at 732 Seymour Street. By the summer the club was advertising jobs, and seems to have opened by the fall at 724 Seymour. It is unclear who was responsible for the club's revival. The newly-opened Quadra remained a private club, however, it had become, in essence, a tavern rather than a traditional gentlemen's club. When British Columbia repealed in 1921 the British Columbia Prohibition Act, which had been in force since 1917, it replaced prohibition with the Government Liquor Act. The new laws, which were upheld by the Liquor Control Board, barred the public sale of alcohol. However, at the time the laws were made, the province's private clubs had lobbied to be allowed to sell liquor on the premises. Accordingly, a bar could exploit this loophole by classifying itself as a "private club" and charging a nominal membership fee to anyone who wished to drink. Thus, the Quadra Club morphed into a drinking establishment. In the mid-1950s, Gordon Hazelwood Town (1906–1986) bought the club and became its president. In 1956, Town found himself in the middle of the "Mulligan affair," when he testified that one of police chief Walter Mulligan's associates had attempted to extort him at the Quadra for $3,000. Town began bought a piano for the club and began featuring music. During the 1950s, many of Canada's jazz greats performed at the club. Chris Gage was engaged at the club from 1955-57 in a trio with Stan Johnson and Jimmy Wightman. In the fall of 1964 Gage returned in a trio with Don Thompson and Terry Clarke. The night of his death, Gage had missed his gig at the Quadra. After liquor laws liberalised and the public sale of alcohol became legal, on 15 February 1965 the Quadra became a public cabaret.

=== 1055 Homer, 1973–2003 ===
In 1969, the British Columbia Telephone Company purchased the property at 724 Seymour to expand its exchange building next door. Thus, the Quadra was forced to find a new location. On 24 May 1973, the Quadra opened its new building on Homer Street. A year later, Town retired. In March 1978, the club was purchased by Barry Barenbaum and Doug Anderson. The partners redecorated the club and re-launched it as an upscale supper club with music and dancing. In May 1979, Barenbaum was arrested in California by the FBI. Barenbaum and his girlfriend, Marguerite Louise Baxter, an employee of the Bank of Nova Scotia, siphoned off $2.8 million from the bank into an American bank account. He was sentenced that September to three years in prison. In July 1979 the club was purchased by Suzan Krieger and Heather Farquahar, who ran it for the next four years as a lesbian bar. During this time it was known as Lulu's, though it is unclear whether this was the legal name or merely a nickname for what was still the Quadra. In May 1984, the venue was purchased by a group who reopened it under the name Club Soda. The new ownership group consisted of Bruce Allen, Lou Blair, Roger Gibson, Sam Feldman, Sandy McRae, and Bill Race. In 1992, the club was renamed the Big Easy and redecorated in a New Orleans theme. In late 1993 it was purchased by Nick Smith and it became the Starfish Room. Smith's daughter, Charlotte, ran the club along with Keith Buckingham and Peter McCullough. The Starfish Room closed in 2002 and the building was demolished in 2003.

== See also ==
- List of gentlemen's clubs in Canada
