= Saskatoon Club =

Coordinates: 52.1261°N 106.6604°W

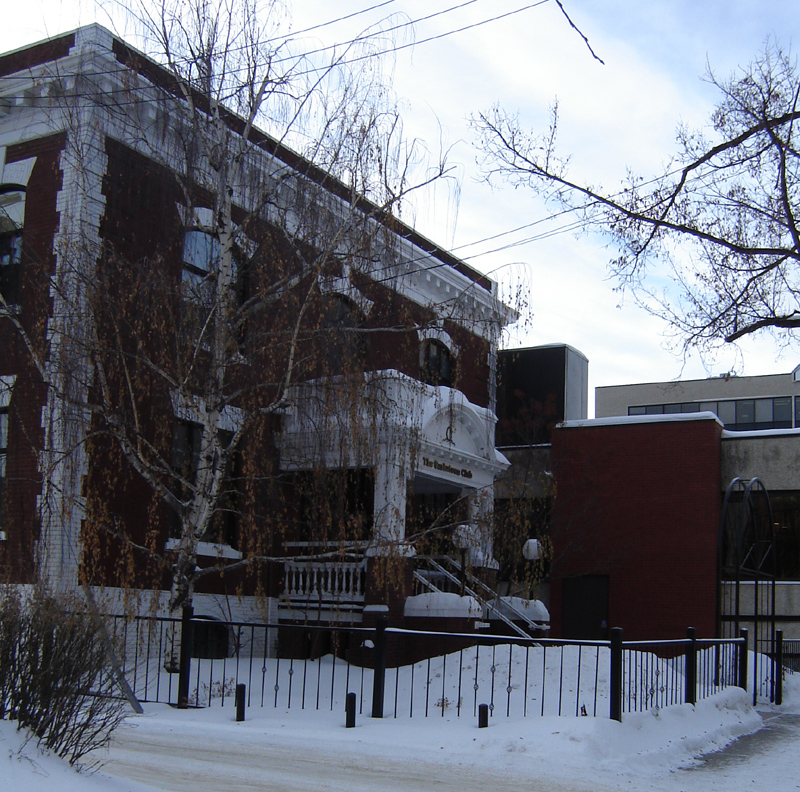
- Saskatoon Club
- Interactive map of the Saskatoon Club area

General information
- Location: Saskatoon, Saskatchewan, Canada
- Construction started: 1911
- Completed: 1912
- Client: Saskatoon Club

Technical details
- Floor count: 2

Design and construction
- Architect: Norman Livingston Thompson

The Saskatoon Club is a business club originally established as a gentleman's club in 1907. The club is located in the Central Business District of Saskatoon, Saskatchewan. The Club operates a dining room, lounge, meeting facilities and a fitness centre. It was incorporated by a private act of the Saskatchewan Legislature.

William Charles Sutherland, Fred Engen, F. S. Cahill, H. L. Jordan and James Straton were the first members of the Executive Committee for the Saskatoon Club.

== Club building ==
The club building is located in the downtown core of the city. By 1909 the club had moved into the MacBeth Block before moving into the current club building in 1912. The current building was designed by Norman Thompson from the firm of Thomson, Daniel and Colthurst. The structure was constructed at the cost of $5000 CDN in February 1911.

== See also ==
- List of gentlemen's clubs in Canada
