= University Club of Montreal =

Private club in Montreal, Quebec

Coordinates: 45.502937°N 73.574274°W

- Formation: 8 November 1907; 118 years ago
- Headquarters: Maison James-Reid-Wilson, 1201, rue Sherbrooke Ouest
- Website: ucmontreal.ca

The University Club of Montreal is a private social club in Montreal, Quebec. Established in 1907, it has been a cornerstone of the city’s social and intellectual community for over a century. Initially conceived in December 1906 as a gentlemen's club for university graduates, it was officially incorporated on November 8, 1907.

== History ==
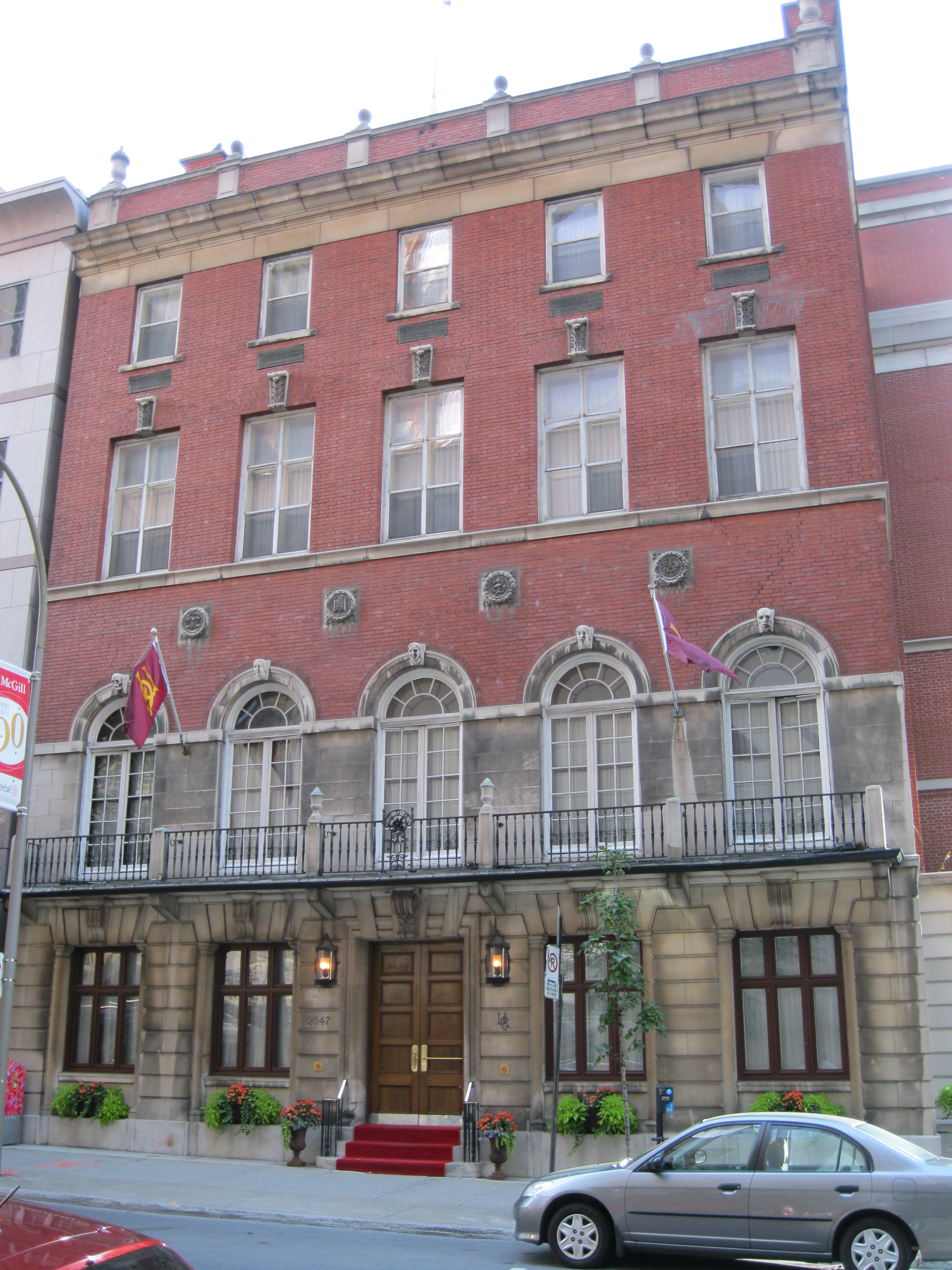
The 1913 clubhouse at 2047 Mansfield, designed by Percy Nobbs. The club relinquished the building in 2017.

=== Early years ===
The University Club initially occupied a three-story building on Dorchester Street West, opposite St. Paul’s Presbyterian Church.In 1911, it purchased the residence of Edward Benjamin Ibbotson at 176 Mansfield Street. Seeking a permanent home, the club acquired property directly opposite and commissioned Scottish architect Percy Erskine Nobbs, then Director of the McGill School of Architecture, to design a new clubhouse. Completed in 1913, the building showcased a Neo-Georgian façade with a limestone ground floor and red brick upper stories. The interior featured exquisite spaces, notably the main dining hall, which remains largely unchanged since its inception.

=== Social evolution ===
Throughout its history, the University Club has evolved to reflect societal changes. In the early 1920s, a women’s annex was added, though women were initially limited to specific areas unless accompanied by a member. Women gained full membership rights in 1988. The club began admitting Jewish members in the 1960s, and in 1973, the requirement for a university degree was removed, broadening its inclusivity.

=== Relocation and modern developments ===
Facing financial challenges, the club sold its historic Mansfield Street building in 2017. In 2022, it relocated to the Maison James-Reid-Wilson at 1201 Sherbrooke Street West, a heritage property restored by Provencher_Roy. This move marked a new chapter, blending the club’s rich traditions with modern amenities.

== Art and cultural contributions ==
The club has an art collection, featuring nearly one hundred works by Canadian artists.

== Notable milestones ==
In 2007, the club celebrated its centennial, commemorated by the publication of a detailed history book.

== Leadership ==
=== President ===
- 1907-1918 – Seargent Prentiss Stearns
- 1918-1920 – Robert Fulford Ruttan
- 1920-1921 – Frederick Edmund Meredith
- 1921-1922 – Alexander D. Blackader
- 1922-1923 – Eugène Lafleur
- 1923-1924 – William Forrest Angus
- 1924-1925 – W. C. Chisholm
- 1925-1926 – Dr Herbert Stanley Birkett
- 1926-1927 – Allan Angus Magee
- 1927-1928 – John J. Creelman
- 1928-1929 – H. M. Little
- 1929-1931 – Charles W. Colb
- 1931-1932 – F. M. G. Johnson
- 1932-1933 – A. T. Bazin
- 1933-1934 – George Selkirk Currie
- 1934-1935 – E. M. McDougall
- 1935-1936 – E. Peter Flintoff
- 1936-1937 – Conrad Dawson Harrington
- 1937-1938 – John Morrice Roger Fairbairn
- 1938-1939 – K. M. Perry
- 1939-1940 – Edward G. Hanson
- 1940-1941 – Gregor Barclay
- 1941-1942 – Edouard de Bellefeuille Panet
- 1942-1943 – J. C. McDougall
- 1943-1944 – W. A. Merrill
- 1944-1945 – T. S. Morrisey
- 1945-1946 – E. S. McDougall
- 1946-1947 – J. H. H. Robertson
- 1947-1948 – Donald A. White
- 1948-1949 – Orville S. Tyndale
- 1949-1950 – James Blain Woodyatt
- 1950-1951 – Reuben Ewart Stavert
- 1951-1952 – Chilion H. G. Heward
- 1952-1953 – A. D. Campbell
- 1953-1954 – Hugh A. Crombie
- 1954-1955 – B. E. Norrish
- 1955-1956 – Shirley G. Dixon
- 1956-1957 – Kenneth A. Creery
- 1957-1958 – John K. Wilson
- 1958-1959 – Kenneth B. Roberton
- 1959-1960 – R. D. Harkness
- 1960-1961 – Paul P. Hutchison
- 1961-1962 – G. P. Hedges
- 1962-1963 – Harrison C. Hayes
- 1963-1964 – Bartlett McLennan Ogilvie
- 1964-1965 – A. James de Lalanne
- 1965-1966 – George M. Hobart
- 1966-1967 – Anson C. McKim
- 1967-1968 – U. C. Cushing
- 1968-1969 – S. Boyd Millen
- 1969-1970 – W. P. Carr
- 1970-1971 – William T. G. Hackett
- 1971-1972 – James E. Pepall
- 1972-1973 – A. Blaikie Purvis
- 1973-1974 – M. Laird Watt
- 1974-1975 – J. E. Morgan
- 1975-1976 – Reford MacDougall
- 1976-1977 – Robert C. Paterson
- 1977-1978 – Peter N. Quinlan
- 1978-1979 – John Lynch-Staunton
- 1979-1980 – Donald S. Wells
- 1980-1981 – Herbert B. McNally
- 1981-1982 – John J. Peacock
- 1982-1983 – Philip E. Johnston
- 1983-1984 – Joseph S. Connolly
- 1984-1985 – R. Douglas Bourke
- 1985-1986 – A. D. Lloyd
- 1986-1987 – Conrad H. Harrington
- 1987-1988 – Stuart H. Cobbett
- 1988-1989 – James A. Robb
- 1989-1990 – Eric L. Clark
- 1990-1992 – David H. Laidley
- 1992-1993 – Philip L. Webster
- 1993-1994 – A. Jean de Grandpré
- 1994-1995 – K. Warren Simpson
- 1995-1996 – Philip P. Aspinall
- 1996-1997 – Claudette Bellemare
- 1997-1998 – David C. A. Hannaford
- 1998-1999 – Bruce Kent
- 1999-2000 – Barrie Drummond Birks
- 2000-2001 – Harvey M. Romoff
- 2001-2002 – Patrick J. Kenniff
- 2002-2003 – E. Lee Hambleton
- 2003-2004 – Mark J. Oppenheim
- 2004-2006 – Pierre Matuszewski
- 2006-2007 – James G. Wright
- 2007-2008 – John F. Lemieux
