= University Club of Toronto =

Private club in Toronto, Ontario

Coordinates: 43.653149°N 79.388068°W

- Formation: 1906; 120 years ago
- Type: Private club
- Headquarters: 380 University Avenue
- Website: universitycluboftoronto.com

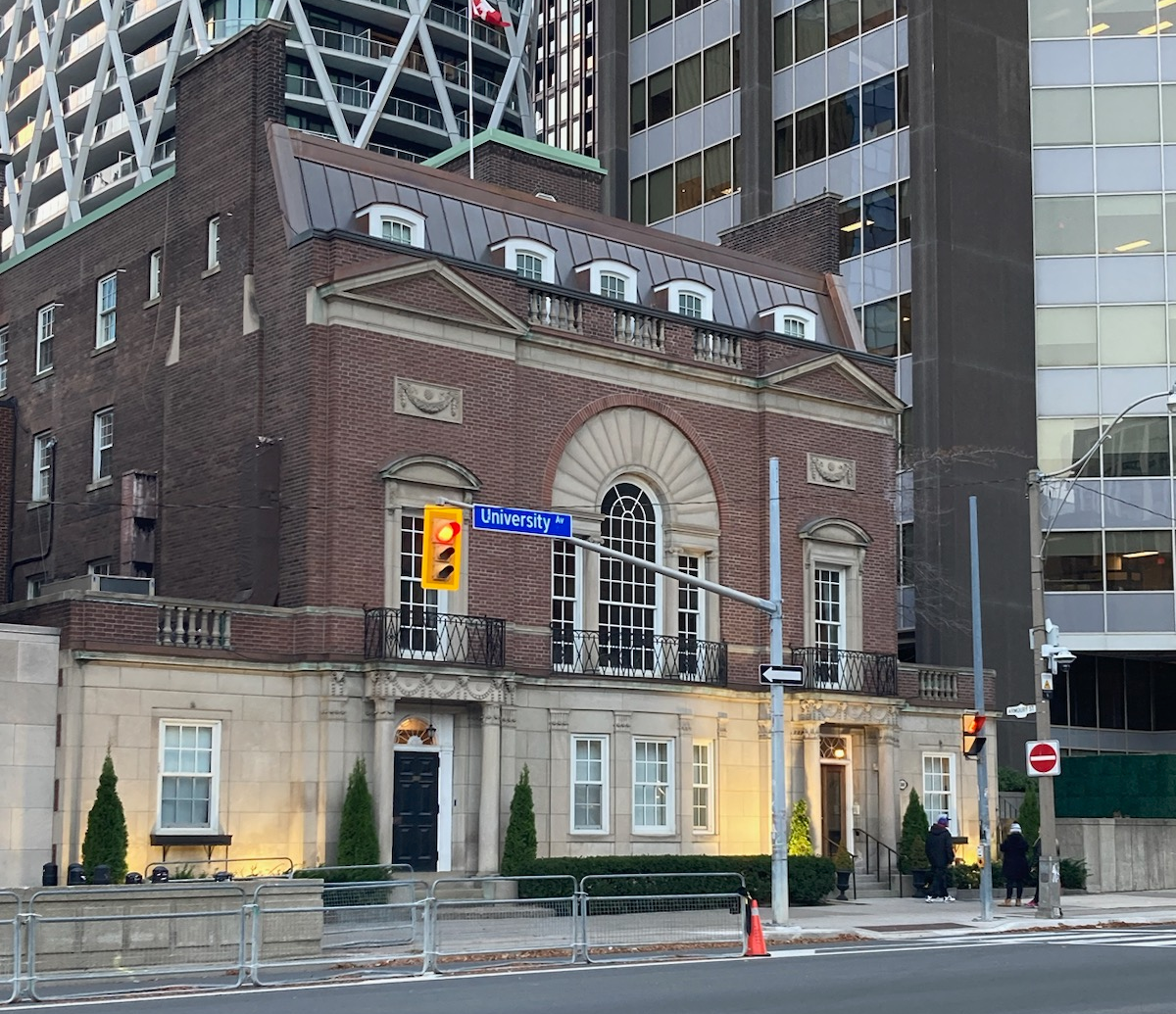
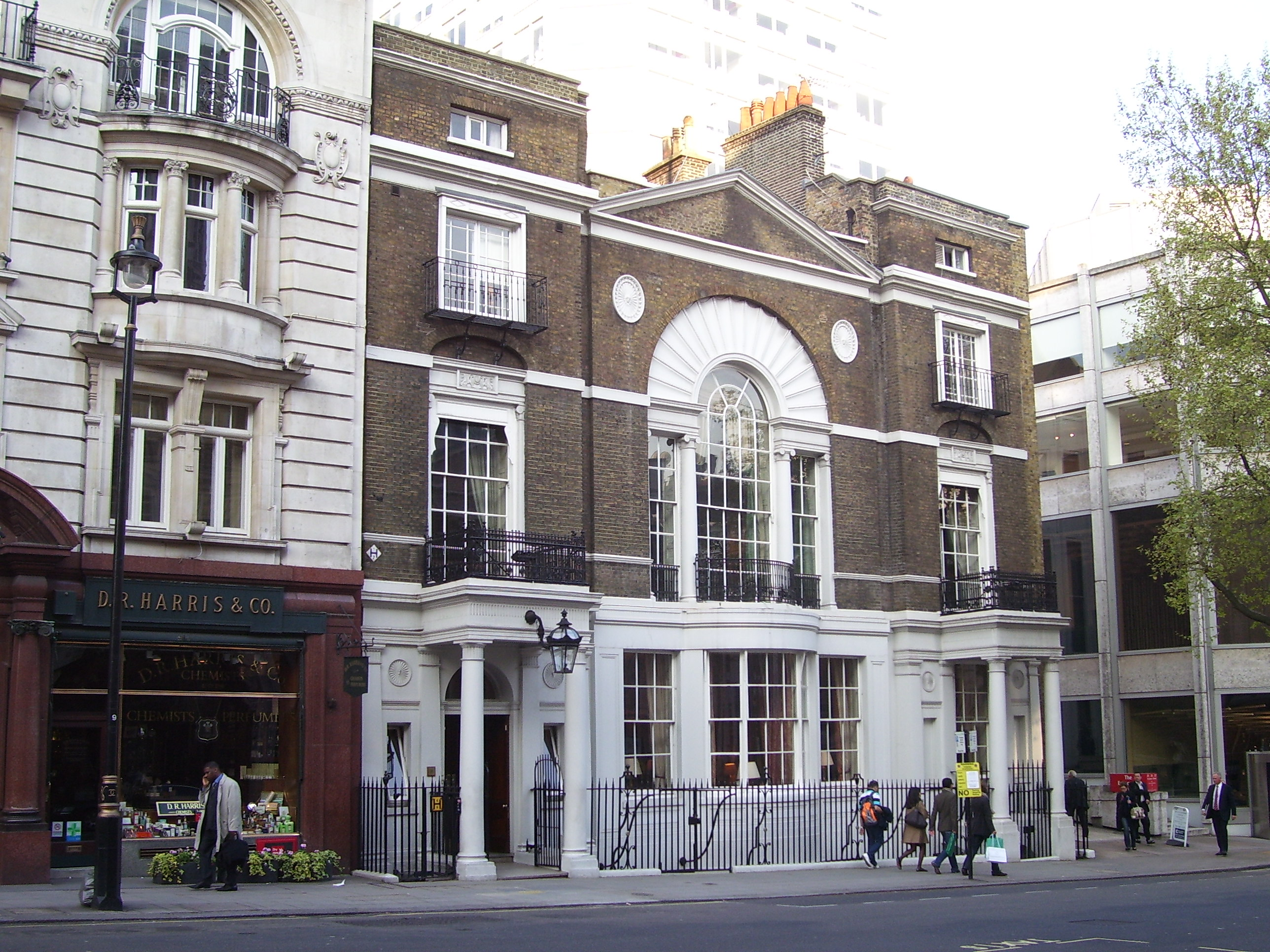
The 1929 University Club (top) was designed by Mathers & Haldenby with Francis Wilkes. It was based on Boodle's (bottom) in London.

The University Club of Toronto is a private social club in Toronto, Ontario that has operated since 1906. The club was founded as a gentlemen's club for men who had attended university, in an era when this was uncommon. As university degrees became increasingly prevalent over the ensuing decades, the club's original purpose diminished. The University Club remained a gentlemen's club until 1988, when it became mixed-sex.

In 1929, the club constructed a new clubhouse on a prominent lot on University Avenue. The design was modeled after Boodle's in London, another famous gentlemen's club.

== Presidents ==
- 1909 – G. F. McFarland
- 1913 – G. S. Hodgson
- 1914 – Lesslie Wilson
- 1919 – J. R. Bone
- 1920 – A. C. Snively
- 1921 – G. H. Sedgewick
- 1922 – G. B. Strathy
- 1923 – S. S. Mills
- 1924 – A. Foulds
- 1925 – Scott Griffin
- 1926 – A. M. Ivey
- 1927 – G. T. Cassels
- 1928 – A. W. R. Sinclair
- 1929 – Alan E. Stewart
- 1930 – G. H. Sedgewick
- 1931 – E. H. Blake
- 1932 – W. R. West
- 1933 – J. Harvey Douglas
- 1934 – N. S. Macdonnell
- 1935 – T. W. Lawson
- 1936 – C. Blake Jackson
- 1937 – Alan B. Garrow
- 1938 – A. A. Walker
- 1939 – M. McCrimmon
- 1940 – R. D. Torrance
- 1941 – Earl Smith
- 1942 – R. M. Fowler
- 1943 – Dr D. L. Selby
- 1944 – Dr H. B. Speakman
- 1945 – R. K. Northey
- 1946 – R. B. Duggan
- 1947 – P. K. Heywood
- 1948 – M. S. Haas
- 1949 – W. W. Stratton
- 1950 – H. C. Symons
- 1951 – G. L. Boone
- 1952 – R. G. Ferguson
- 1953 – J. R. Woods
- 1954 – J. C. McCaul
- 1955 – H. D. Scully
- 1956 – J. C. Stewart
- 1957 – J. G. Edison
- 1958 – R. A. Harris
- 1959 – D. H. Jupp
- 1960 – G. M. MacLachlan
- 1961 – V. C. Wansbrough
- 1962 – F. W. Woods
- 1963 – James Flintoft
- 1964 – G. H. Curtis
- 1965 – J. R. O'Kell
- 1966 – R. T. Payton
- 1967 – J. W. Walker
- 1968 – J. B. Matchett
- 1969 – J. D. Woods
- 1970 – Stan BIggs
- 1971 – Philip Jackson
- 1972 – Fraser M. Fell
- 1973 – F. R. Southmayd
- 1974 – W. C. Weber
- 1975 – G. Dembroski
- 1976 – G. Tiviluk
- 1977 – John Richardson
- 1978 – Aubrey Russell
- 1979 – J. P. Bunting
- 1980 – Paul Jeffrey
- 1981 – William Livingston
- 1982 – Bryce Hunter
- 1983 – D. Mills
- 1983 – L. Clark
- 1984 – Ron Ritchie
- 1985 – Gord Cunningham
- 1986 – David Grierson
- 1987 – Lee Woods
- 1988 – Donald Rumball
- 1990 – Doug Mills
- 1991 – Angus Scott
- 1993 – Ed Saunders
- 1995 – John Swinden
- 1996 – Dan Damov
- 1997 – Bill Mounfield
- 1998 – Blake Hutcheson
- 2000 – Don Rickerd
- 2001 – Tim Reid
- 2003 – George Strathy
- 2005 – Rainer Beltzner

== Sources ==
- Rumball, Donald. The University Club of Toronto: Its Life, Its Times, 1906-2006. University Club of Toronto, 2008.
