= Ontario Club =

Private club in Toronto (1909–2011)

Coordinates: 43.6478°N 79.3788°W

- Formation: 8 February 1909
- Dissolved: 25 November 2011
- Type: Private club
- Headquarters: 16 Wellington Street W

The Ontario Club was a private club in Toronto, Ontario that existed from 1909 to 2011. The club was founded as a gentlemen's club, but in 1978 became mixed-sex. The Ontario was organised as a home for members of the Liberal Party of Canada, and as such, was the counterpart to the Albany Club, which was for members of the Conservative Party of Canada. From 1912 to 1969, the Ontario Club had a clubhouse on Wellington Street. After it sold the property to the Canadian Imperial Bank of Commerce, from 1972 to 2007, it occupied the top floor of Commerce Court South. In 2011, the Ontario Club merged into the National Club.

== History ==
=== Early history and first clubhouse, 1909–1972 ===
The origins of the Ontario Club lie in the 1908 Canadian federal election. In that election, the Liberal Party of Canada won 133 seats, while the opposition parties won 88. However, all seats in Toronto went to members of the Conservative Party of Canada. In response to this situation, a group of Liberal supporters decided to form a gentlemen's club to provide a social home for party members in Toronto, and to enhance the party's status in the city. The founders of the club were Michael John Haney (1856–1927), James Houston Spence (1867–1939), George Tower Ferguson (1856–1932), Gabriel Thomas Somers (1867–1926), and Dr Thomas Franklin McMahon (1852–1925). In late 1908, the five founders created a list of 300 individuals they would approach to become members, and by January 1909 there were 312 applications to join the club. Original members of the club paid a $25 initiation fee, $10 of which was paid upon application, and the balance paid when the club incorporated. The club met for the first time on 20 January 1909 to choose a name and elect a provisional board. Directors elected to the first board were Haney, Somers, Ferguson, and McMahon from the founders group, as well as James Herbert Denton, Peter Charles Larkin, Maj Charles Alexander Moss, Thomas Saunders Hobbs, and James Frederick Martin Stewart. During the first meeting, a debate arose about the issue of temperance. William Raney, who led the group in favour of temperance, argued that the club should not create a possible policy conflict with the party. Haney, who was chairman of the meeting, was also in favour of a dry club. He said, "I'm not a temperance crank, but I believe the club will be better off without liquor." Attendees voted 50-9 in favour of asking for liquor privileges in their application to incorporate. The club was granted a charter on 8 February 1909, and held its first board meeting on 26 March of that year. At that meeting, members elected an official board. Further directors added to the provisional board were Lloyd Harris, Leighton McCarthy, J. W. Curry, Dr John Herbert McConnell, John Bain, and Joseph Fisher Eby. Edward Clarkson was elected auditor. His firm, Clarkson Gordon & Co, would remain the club's auditors for decades. By November, the club had 433 resident and 130 non-resident members.

In the late summer of 1909, the club moved into the former Bay Street clubhouse of the National Club, which that year had moved into its new clubhouse a block to the north. This building stood on the current site of the Toronto Stock Exchange Building. On 5 January 1910, the club hosted its first banquet, and Sir Wilfrid Laurier was its guest of honour. At the banquet, Laurier delivered a speech that began, "yet once again it is my privilege to be among the Grits of Toronto, because there is a double merit attached to being a Grit in Toronto. There are places in which it is as natural to be a Grit as to breathe the air of heaven. Of such I know many. But of such Toronto is not one. It must be recognised that the atmosphere of Toronto has never been conducive to Gritism." The Ontario Club remained at its first location until 31 December 1910. After the lease expired, in January 1911 the club moved into the Lumsden Building on Yonge Street.

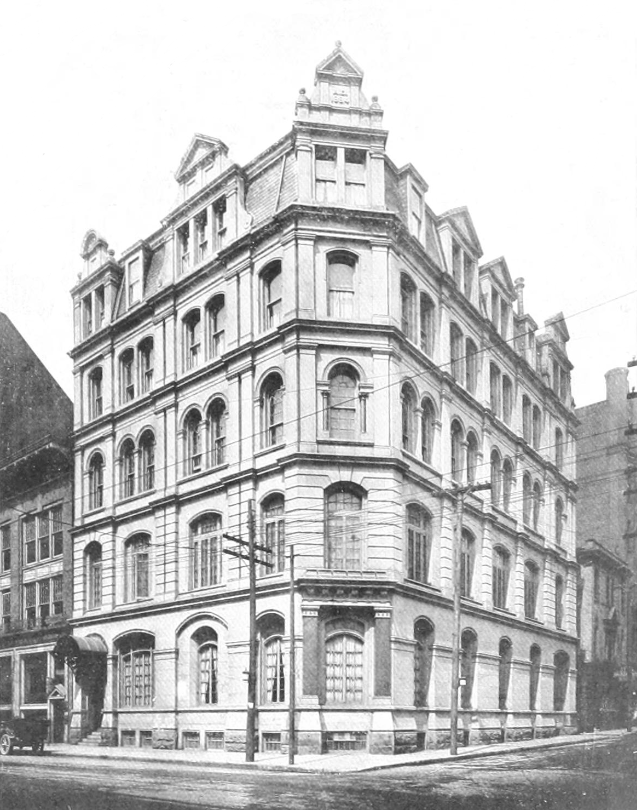
The clubhouse at 16 Wellington opened in 1912. The building was demolished in July 1969.

In 1910, Larkin, the chairman of the club's New Quarters Committee, began negotiating with the Standard Bank of Canada to acquire its head office building at 16 Wellington Street. The building had been erected in 1884 and was designed by David Brash Dick. In 1911 the club arranged a deal with the bank to acquire the building for $120,000. To complete the purchase, the club paid $20,000 in cash and received a $100,000 mortgage from Manulife. Once the sale was finalised, work began to raise money for the conversion of the building into a clubhouse. Costs for the renovations were estimated at $80,000, therefore, the club issued $75,000 in 20-year five per cent gold bonds maturing in 1931. Work was completed in the summer of 1912, at which time the club moved into its new quarters. The first banquet at the new clubhouse took place in November 1913, and again Sir Wilfrid Laurier attended as the guest of honour.

The renovations on the bank were designed by Sproatt & Rolph. While the exterior walls of the building were kept, the structure was otherwise gutted and rebuilt with new columns and floor beams. The basement of the club held a barber shop and cloak room. The entrance hall, main dining room, and servery were on the main floor. The second floor held the library, magazine room, and two private dining rooms. The third floor had a billiards room and two card rooms. The fourth and fifth floors consisted of bedrooms for members, though the kitchen occupied half of the fifth floor.

By November 1913, membership was around 800, with around 500 resident members. The club's initiation fee had been set in December 1912 at $300 (approximately $8,000 in 2023) and annual fees for resident members were $50 (approximately $1,300 in 2023). Seven members of the Ontario Club were killed in World War I. During the war, all clubs in Toronto stopped serving drinks after 8 pm. In 1925, membership reached an all-time high of 925, with 654 resident members. By 1929, total membership dropped to 845. The club struggled financially during the Great Depression and in 1938 imposed two assessments of $50 each. During World War II, any military officer could receive a membership free of charge, however, these memberships were revoked when the war ended. By the summer of 1945, membership was 419, with 309 resident members. To increase membership, that year the club created a new "junior member" category for gentlemen aged 21 to 29, with an amortised initiation fee and annual dues of $33 ($570 in 2023). Also that year, the initiation fee for regular members was reduced to $200 ($3,450 in 2023).

During the late 1940s, the fifth floor was insulated, and roofing, painting, plumbing, and electrical improvements were undertaken. In 1954, air conditioning was installed in the dining room, the billiard and card rooms were relocated, and the cocktail lounge was redecorated. At the same time, much of the electrical system and plumbing were replaced. Consequently, an assessment of $100 was imposed on resident members. In 1955, the entrance fee was increased to $400 ($4,500 in 2023) and annual dues increased to $140 ($1,500 in 2023). In 1959, three private dining rooms were added to the fifth floor, which reduced the total number of bedrooms to five. That year, total membership was 749, with 556 resident members.

In 1968, the club decided to sell its building for $1.5 million to the Canadian Imperial Bank of Commerce to allow for the construction of the Commerce Court complex. The sale included an agreement for the club to lease the top floor of the south building in the group. In May 1969, the club vacated its historic quarters and moved temporarily into the 19th and 20th floors of the Royal York Hotel.

=== Later years and second clubhouse, 1972–2010 ===
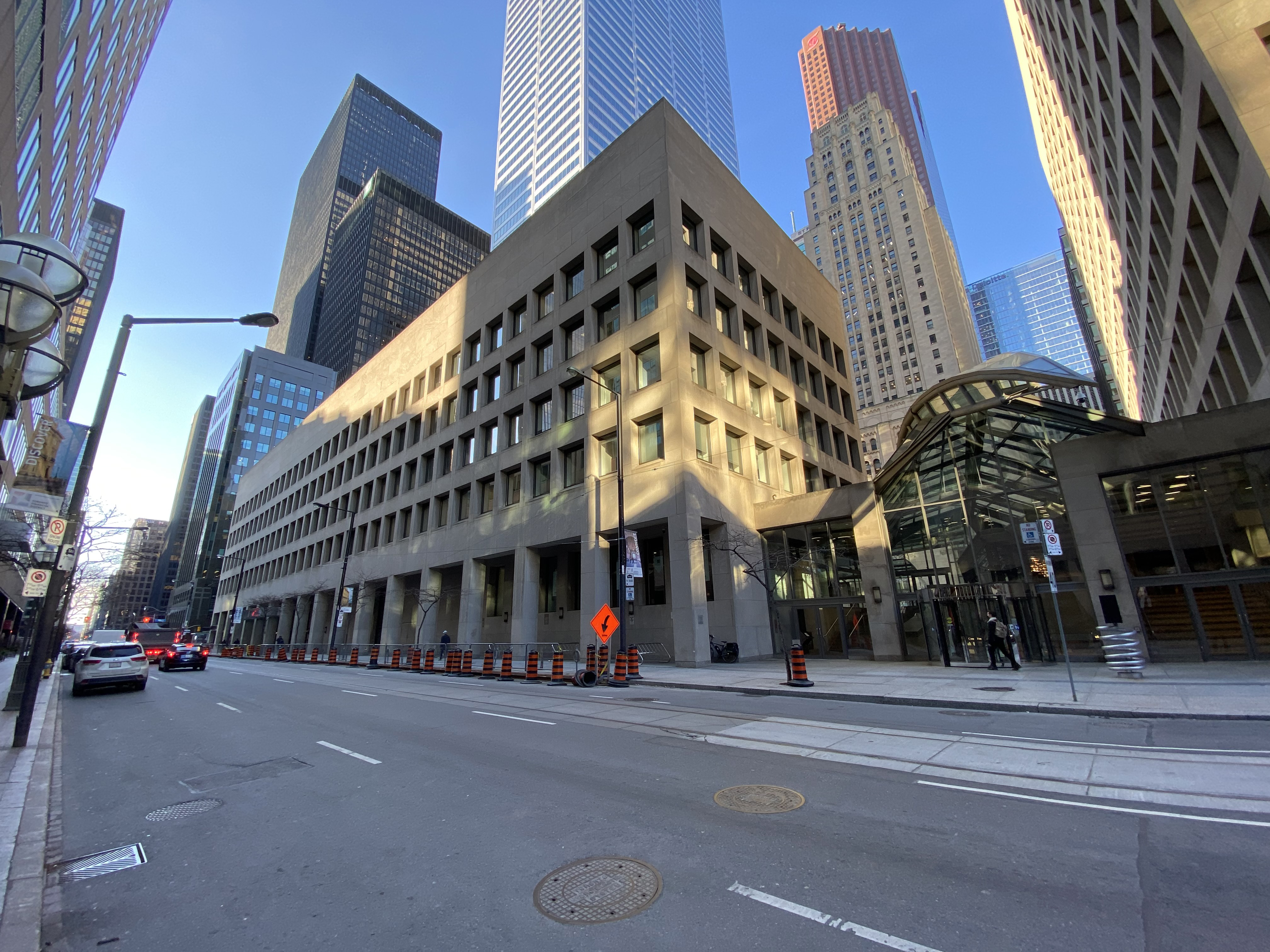
The club occupied the top floor of Commerce Court South from 1972 to 2007. The building stands on the site of the original clubhouse.

On Tuesday, 9 May 1972, Premier Bill Davis opened the new quarters in Commerce Court South. The new clubhouse featured Louis XVI, Chippendale, Hepplewhite, and Queen Anne armchairs, Sheraton buffets, Persian carpets, 18th-century pewter chandeliers, silk draperies, Botticino marble walls, and 11-foot high beamed ceilings. At the opening, Davis and John Robarts were given honorary memberships.

In 1978, the club created a new membership category called "diplomatic," and was the first club in Toronto to have such a class. In January of that year, it admitted 16 new members to that category, all from foreign countries. Among them was Rita de Arismendi, the consul general of Venezuela. In 1985, the club voted to amend its bylaws to allow women to become full members.

In 1989, the Engineers' Club, which had been founded in 1895, made the decision to redevelop its clubhouse at 105 Victoria Street. The new clubhouse would have retail at street level, club quarters on the first three floors, and 40 condominiums above. When the real estate market collapsed in January 1990, the club lost its building and was forced to find a new home. In November 1992, the Engineers' Club decided to merge into the Ontario Club. At the time, the Ontario's membership was around 755, while the Engineers' was 545, creating a total membership of around 1300. Although both clubs had in the 1980s ceased to be gentlemen's clubs, both still had less than 50 female members. The Star commented that, "the reason there isn't a higher proportion of female members is that luncheon clubs aren't recruiting many members of either sex these days. Times are tough, and habits have changed."

At the end of March 2007, the club's lease in Commerce Court expired. At that time, it moved into new quarters on the 12th and 13th floors of the One King West Hotel & Residence. However, at the end of February 2009, the club lost its lease and was left homeless. In 2010, remaining members of the Ontario Club merged into the National Club.

== Presidents ==
- 1909-10 – M. J. Haney
- 1911-13 – Peter Charles Larkin
- 1914-20 – C. M. Bowman
- 1921-24 – James Houston Spence
- 1925-26 – William Henry McGuire
- 1927-28 – Charles Bauckham
- 1929-30 – J. A. McLaren
- 1931-32 – H. M. Forbes
- 1933 – Georgie Wilkie
- 1934-35 – J. C. MacFarlane
- 1936-37 – H. G. Ratcliffe
- 1938 – R. G. Meech
- 1939-40 – P. E. F. Smily
- 1941-43 – H. J. Welch
- 1944 – H. H. Johnson
- 1945-47 – J. Cameron
- 1948 – C. H. Spooner
- 1949-50 – T. C. Chisholm
- 1951-52 – Donald Taylor
- 1953 – E. V. Larson
- 1954-55 – D. A. Keith
- 1956 – D. M. Andrews
- 1957 – A. H. Wait
- 1958-59 – Norman G. Cummings

== Club histories ==
- The Ontario Club, Toronto: Golden Anniversary, 1909–1959. Toronto, 1959.

== See also ==
- List of gentlemen's clubs in Canada
