= Soldiers' Tower =

Memorial at the University of Toronto St. George

- Canada
- The Soldiers' Tower seen from the south on Hart House Circle
- For members of the University of Toronto who served in the World Wars
- Unveiled: 1924
- Location: 43°39′48.5″N 79°23′42.5″W; Toronto, Ontario, Canada
- Designed by: Henry Sproatt and Ernest Ross Rolph
- names of alumni lost in the Great War (1914–18) and in the Second World War (1939–45).

The Soldiers' Tower is a bell and clock tower on the St. George campus of the University of Toronto that commemorates members of the university who served in the World Wars. Designed by architects Henry Sproatt and Ernest Ross Rolph, the Gothic Revival tower stands at 143 feet (43.6 m) tall and houses a carillon of 51 bells. It is attached to Hart House.

== History ==
After the Great War, university alumni raised $397,141 to erect the tower as a war memorial. The cornerstone was laid in 1919 by Victor Cavendish, 9th Duke of Devonshire, the 11th Governor General of Canada. Construction was completed in 1924 at a cost of $252,500, with the surplus funds endowed for scholarships in perpetuity. The names of those lost in the Great War (1914–18) are etched on a sheltered stone screen adjacent to the tower's base, while the inner walls of the tower's stone archway are inscribed with the names of those lost in the Second World War (1939–45).

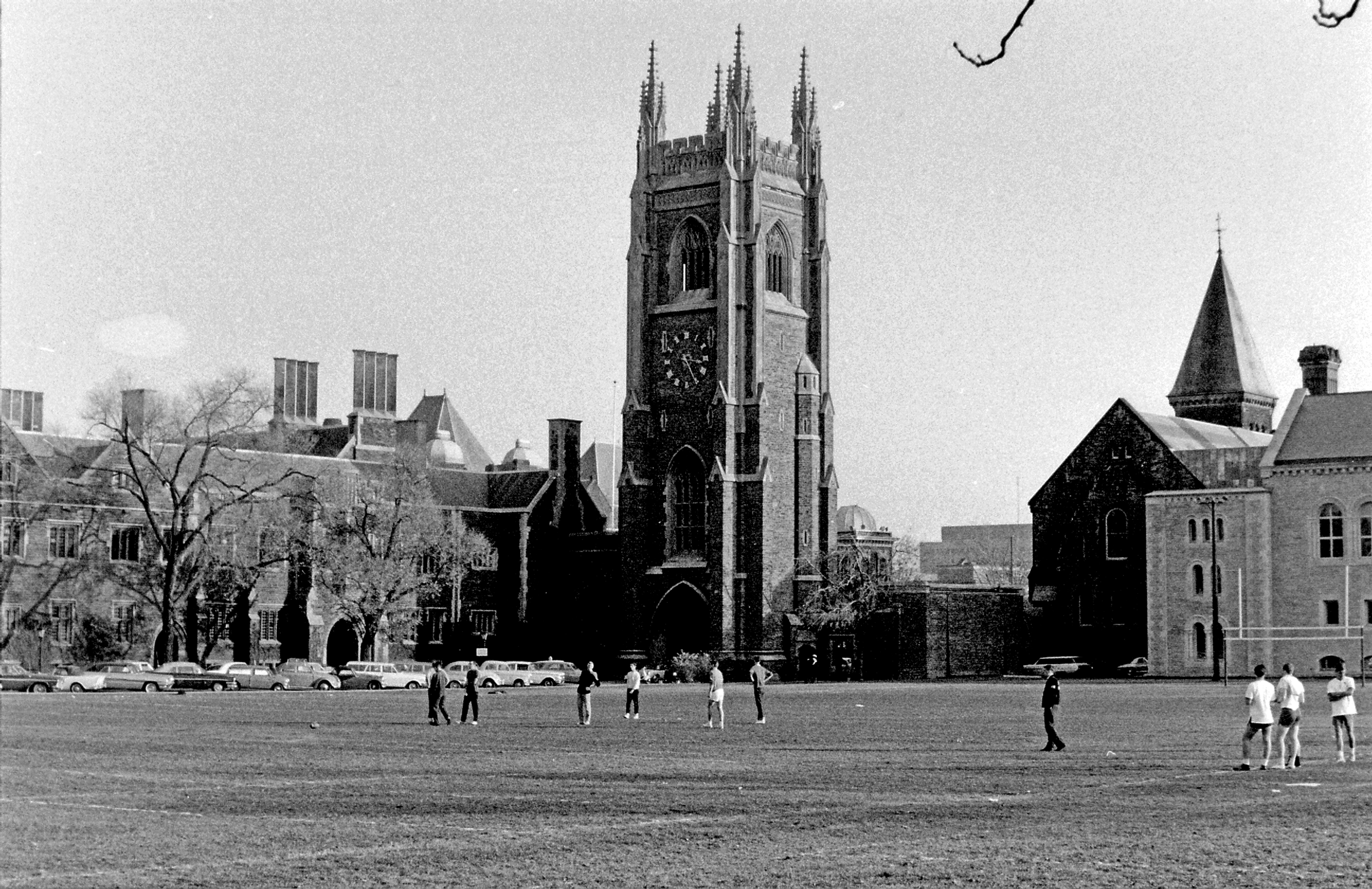
The Soldiers' Tower seen from Back Campus in 1964

In 1927, the clock was installed and the carillon was dedicated with its first 23 bells. Both were purchased by the alumni association from the famous British firm Gillett & Johnston, which also cast the bells atop the Peace Tower on Parliament Hill. An additional 19 bells were added in 1952 to commemorate World War II, but were replaced in 1976 and more bells added. The carillon was rededicated that year at its present size with the addition of these 28 bells from Petit & Fritsen. In that same operation the transposition of this carillon was unfortunately raised: whereas the instrument at first transposed down a major second, its 51 bells now speak at concert pitch. The bells of the Soldiers' Tower Carillon range in weight from 23 pounds to the bourdon's 4 tons, and are performed on special occasions such as convocation, reunions, homecoming and Remembrance Day in addition to regular recitals attended by university members and the general public. Remembrance Day Ceremonies at the University of Toronto are held yearly, on or about the 11th of November. During the ceremonies on the St. George campus, representatives from many Canadian institutions lay wreaths at the foot of the Soldier's Tower in honour of alumni who, as soldiers, made the ultimate sacrifice during WWI and WWII.

== Memorials ==
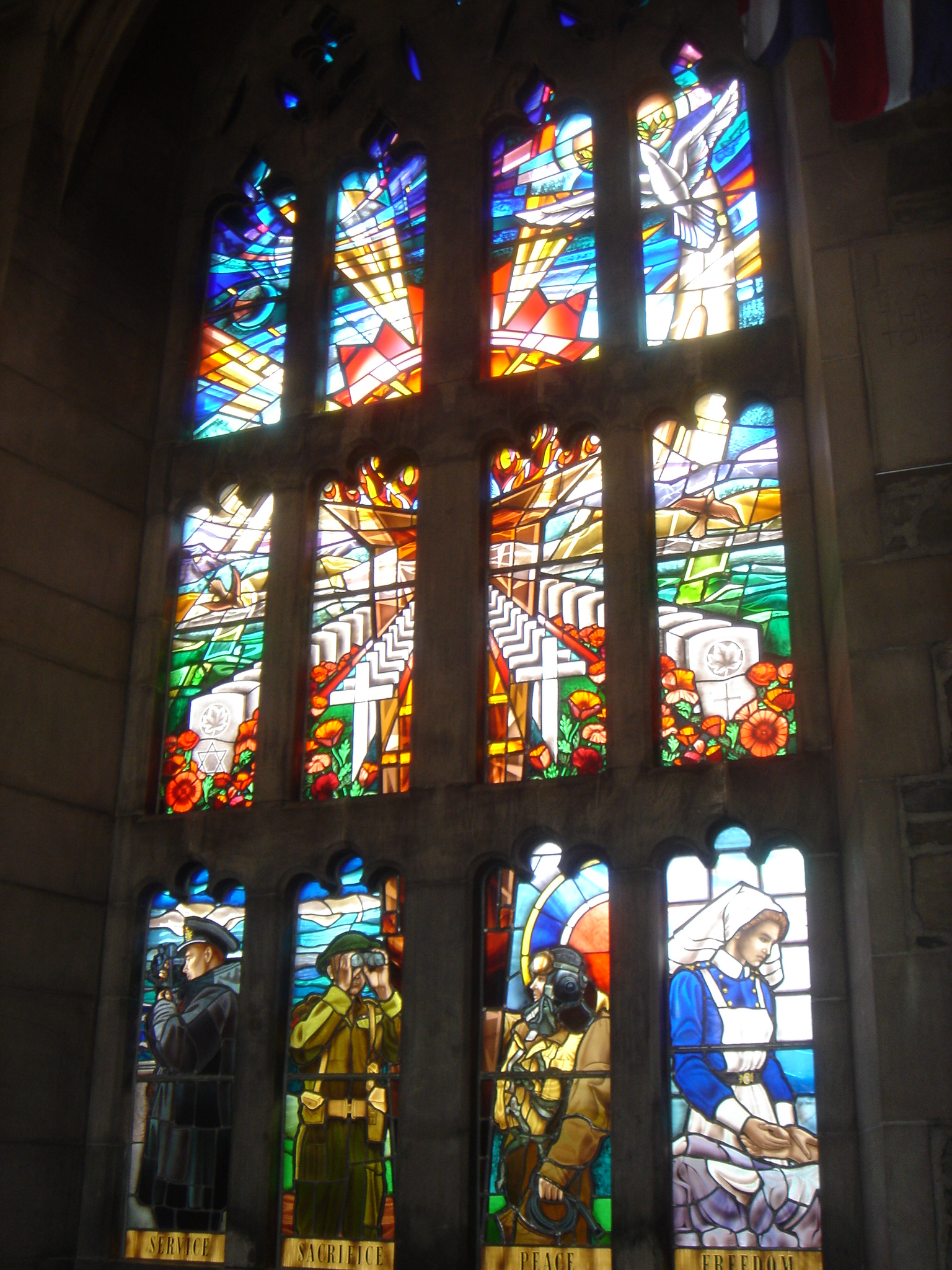
One of the stained glass windows at the tower

The Soldiers' Tower features a dramatic 12-panel stained-glass window that is partly a visual interpretation of John McCrae's "In Flanders Fields", along with 8 smaller stained-glass windows that depict men and women of the armed forces at wartime. This memorial is dedicated to members of the University of Toronto who served in the First and Second World Wars. A museum within the tower showcases a collection of medals, memorial books, portraits, photographs, flags and miscellaneous memorabilia from the period. A memorial stained glass window is dedicated to three University College students (Malcolm Mackenzie, I.H. Mewburn, and William Tempest) killed in the Fenian Raids. High on the wall of the Memorial Room there is a memorial carved in stone for each of the Carillon of 51 bells (iron plus playing console) which memorialize individuals at the University of Toronto who lost their lives in World War I.

== Inscriptions ==
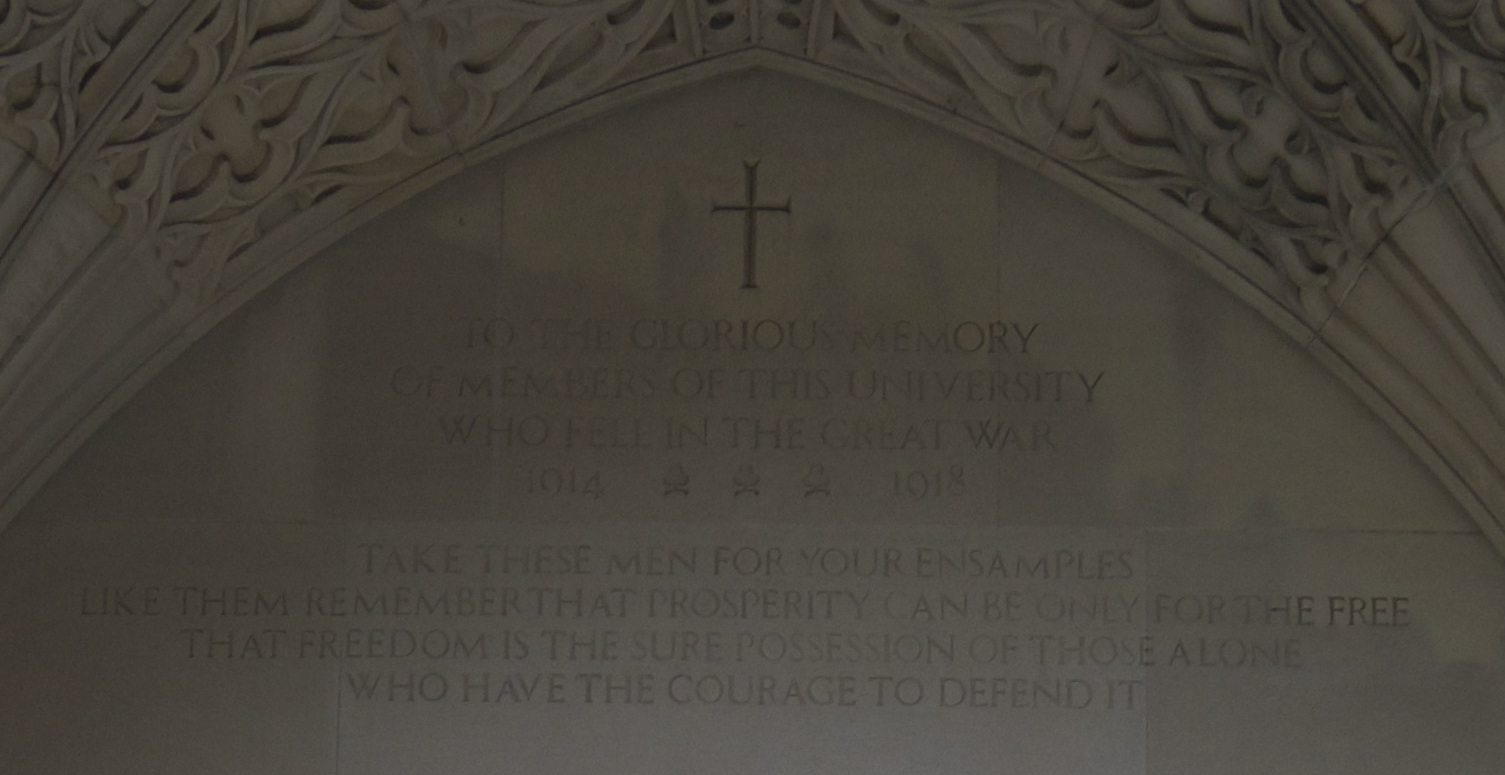
WWI inscription on the Soldiers' Tower

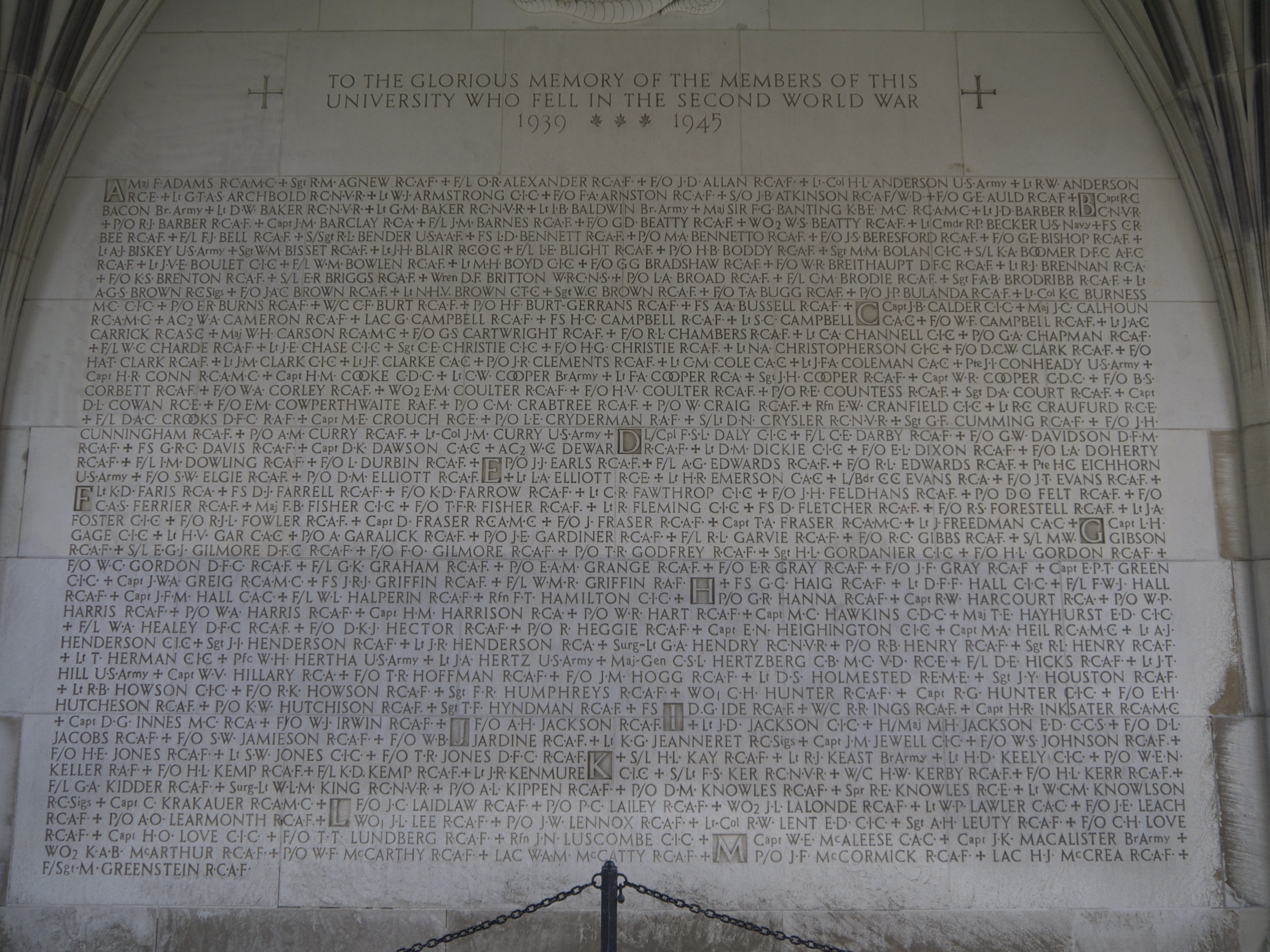
First WWII memorial panel

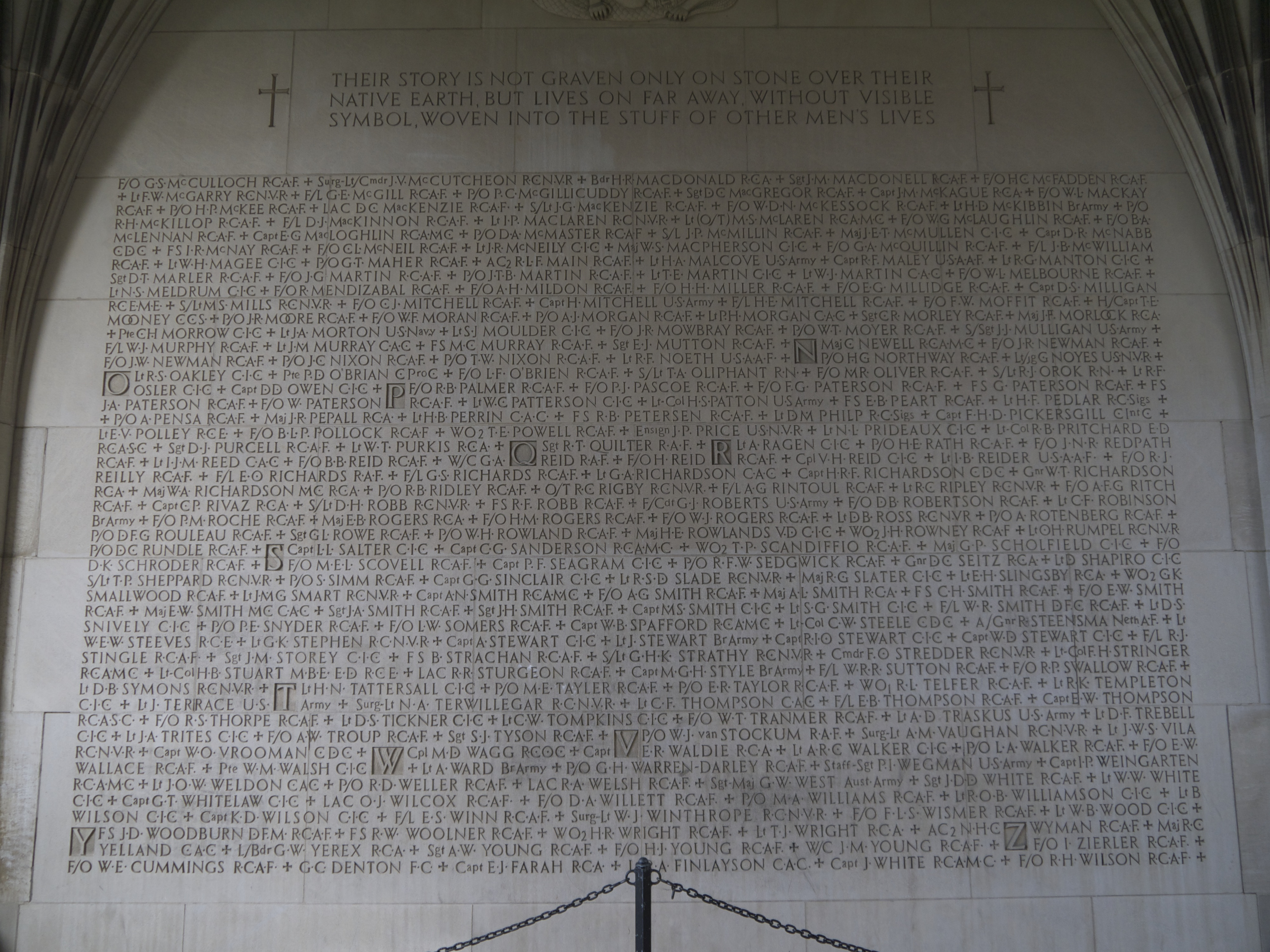
Second WWII memorial panel

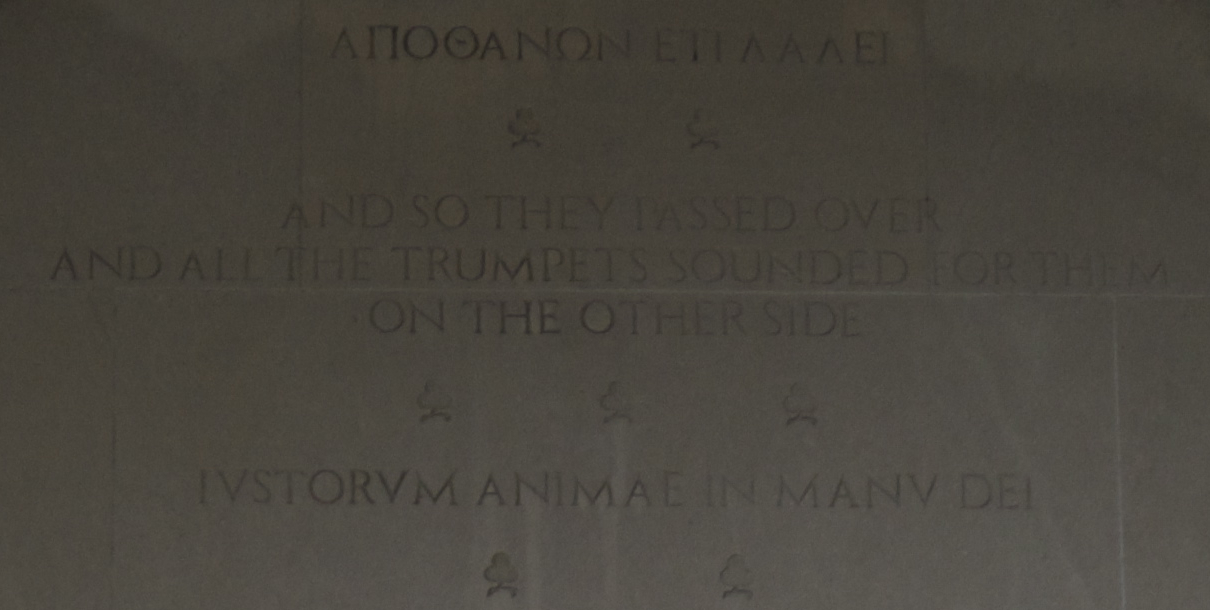
Additional WWI inscription

The First World War inscription on the memorial panels of the Soldiers' Tower is:

To the glorious memory
of members of this University
who fell in the Great War
1914–1918

Take these men for your ensamples
like them remember that prosperity can be only for the free
that freedom is the sure possession of those alone
who have the courage to defend it.

The Second World War inscription on the memorial panels is:

To the glorious memory of the members of this
University who fell in the Second World War
1939–1945

Their story is not graven only in stone over their
native earth, but lives on far away, without visible
symbol, woven into the stuff of other men's lives.

An additional set of inscriptions on the First World War panels includes two biblical quotes in Ancient Greek and Latin, respectively:

apothanōn eti lalei

And so they passed over
and all the trumpets sounded for them
on the other side.

Iustorum animae in manu Dei

The first biblical quote is from Hebrews 11:4: "Though dead, he still speaks." The second biblical quote is taken from Wisdom 3:1: "The souls of the just [are] in the hands of God."

Reproduced is the poem "In Flanders Fields". Among the list of the dead in WWI is the poem's author, John McCrae.

== See also ==
- List of carillons
- Halifax Town Clock – a clock tower in Halifax, Nova Scotia
- Montreal Clock Tower – a clock tower in Montreal, Quebec
