= Frank Darling =

Frank Darling may refer to:

- Sir Frank Fraser Darling (1903–1979), English ecologist, ornithologist, farmer, conservationist and author
- Frank Darling (architect) (1850–1923), Canadian architect
