= Books of Remembrance (Canada) =

- Commonwealth War Graves Commission
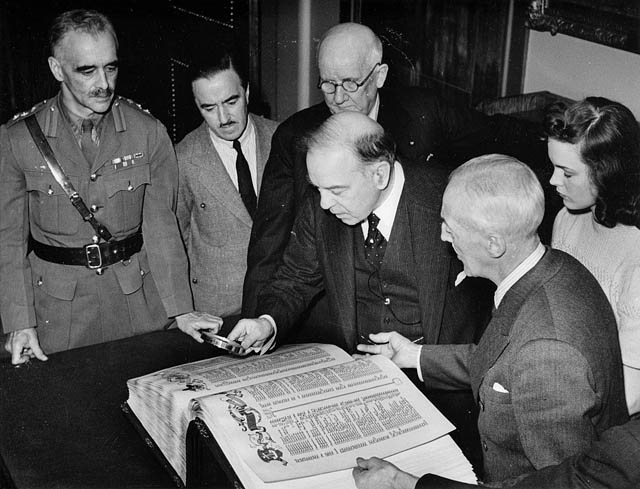
- William Lyon Mackenzie King examines the first Book of Remembrance in 1942.
- For members of the Canadian Forces and Canadian Merchant Navy killed on active service in wartime, and in other conflicts
- Unveiled: August 3, 1927
- Location: near Ottawa, Ontario, Canada
- Designed by: James Purves 1929–1940; Alan Beddoe 1940–1975; ...

The eight Books of Remembrance (French: Livres du Souvenir) housed in the Memorial Chamber in the Peace Tower of the Canadian Parliament Buildings in Ottawa are illuminated manuscript volumes recording the names of members of the Canadian Forces and Canadian Merchant Navy killed on active service in wartime, and in other conflicts. There are eight separate books, beginning with the first to be commissioned listing the names of the dead from the First World War.

The display case for the first book was designed by John A. Pearson, architect of the Peace Tower, and made by Bromsgrove Guild Limited (Great Britain) and Robert Mitchell Company in 1928. Made of bronze, enamel and other metals, it is decorated with four kneeling angels and a ribbon encircling a laurel. It rests on an altar of English Hopton Wood Stone that was a British gift to Canada, situated at the centre of the chamber. Later books are displayed on altars of Hopton Wood Stone and bronze, decorated with poppies, located against the walls of the chamber.

The pages of each of the books are turned every day of the year at 11 a.m. by a constable of the Parliamentary Protective Service, so that every name is on display to visitors at least once during each calendar year.

== Conception of the books ==
During the First World War on July 1, 1917, Prime Minister Robert Borden announced a Memorial Chamber would be included in the soon-to-be constructed Peace Tower, part of the rebuild of the Centre Block of the Canadian parliament buildings after a 1916 fire. He said that it would be a "memorial to the debt of our forefathers and to the valour of those Canadians who, in the Great War, fought for the liberties of Canada, of the Empire, and of humanity".

Although it was originally hoped to inscribe the names of the dead Canadians upon the walls of the chamber, it was decided that it was more practical to follow Colonel A. Fortesque Duguid's idea to house Books of Remembrance inside the chamber instead.

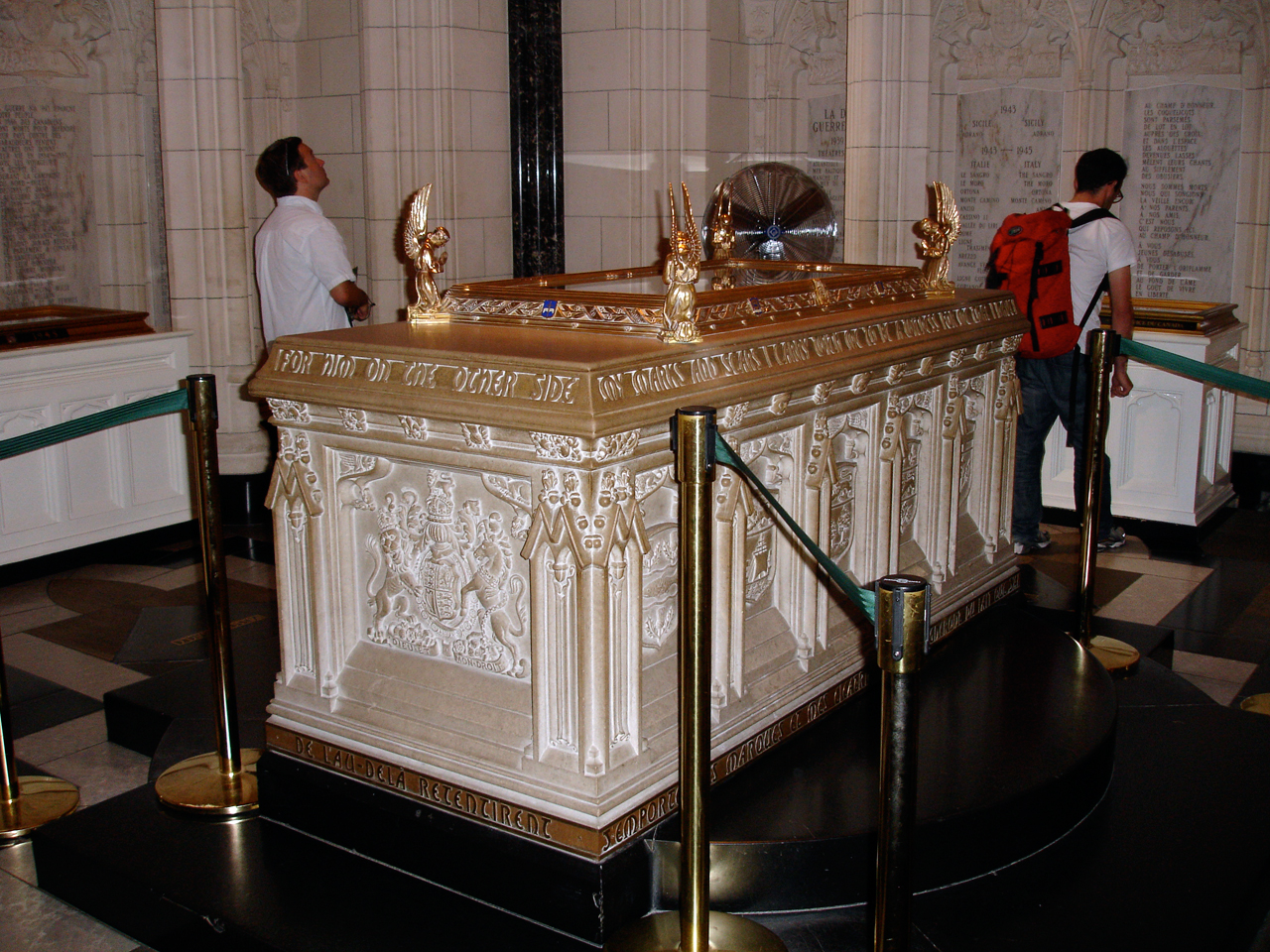
The altar upon which sits the First World War Book of Remembrance

On August 3, 1927, while in Ottawa, the Prince of Wales (later King Edward VIII) unveiled an altar, a gift from the British government, upon which the book of the First World War would rest. The stone for the steps came from quarries in Flanders Fields and the brass nameplates were cast from spent shell casings from the war.

=== Illumination ===
All the books have some illumination; those for the two world wars having the most, with each page having a wide border at the top decorated with plant motifs, usually leaves, and a unit badge. Other books only have illumination on the title page.

== The Books ==
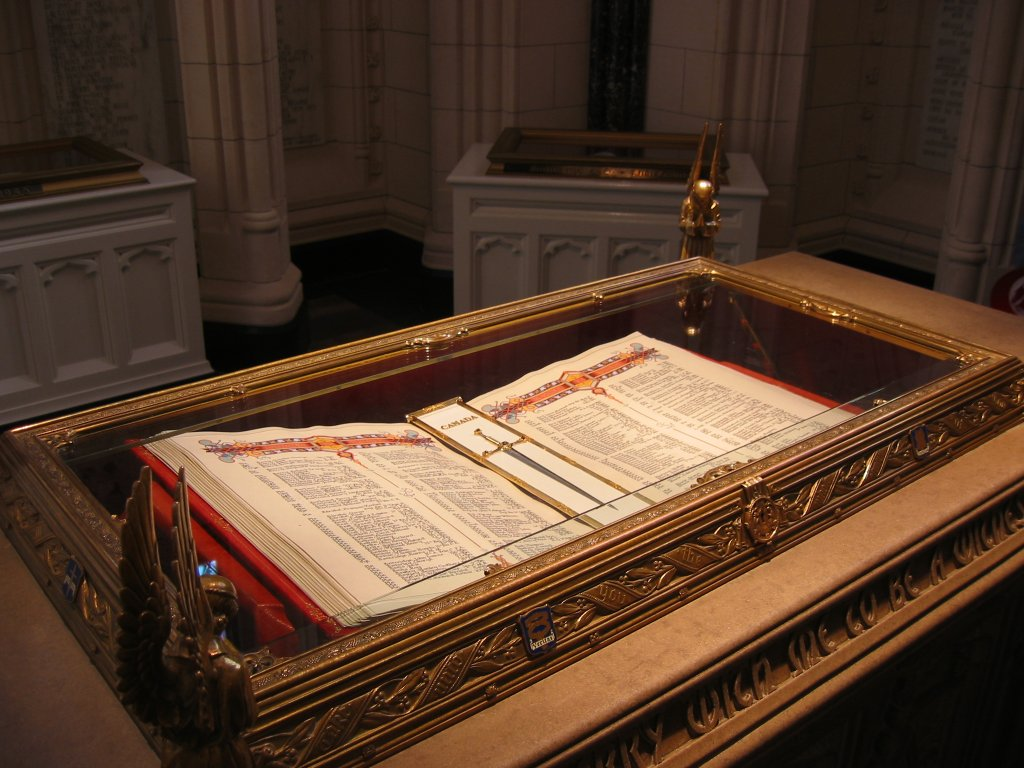
One of the Books of Remembrance

=== First World War ===
The book of the First World War is the largest of the books, containing 66,655 names. It took James Purves of London, Ontario, eleven years to gather the necessary materials to begin work on the book, and upon his death in 1940, work passed to his assistant Alan Beddoe, who completed the book by 1942. (Beddoe spent the next thirty years of his life as the chief artist of the books, dying in 1975.) Contributors to the first book included Evelyn Lambart, who would go on to become an animator at the National Film Board of Canada.

=== Second World War ===
In 1948, it was announced that a second book would be created to memorialize the 44,893 Canadians who had died in the Second World War. This time Beddoe was given a chief assistant, five assistant artists, two writers, an accounting officer and a proof-reader to help with the book, scheduled to be completed in 1952. A series of delays, however, slowed the progress of the book – notably after the government decided that work should be restarted in 1951, to re-write all the names, this time including the abbreviations of individual regiments. The book was completed in 1957, and that Remembrance Day was placed in the Memorial Chamber alongside the first book.

In 1959, humidity destroyed the bindings of the two World War books, requiring them to be re-bound.

=== Newfoundland ===
The Newfoundland book, commemorating over 2300 Newfoundlanders who died in the First and Second World War (before Newfoundland became a province of Canada), was placed in the Memorial Chamber in 1973.

=== Korean War ===
516 Canadians died in the Korean War (1950–1953).

=== South African War and Nile Expedition ===
Canada's first overseas war, the Nile Expedition (1884–1885) claimed the lives of 16 volunteers from the 400-man Canadian Nile Voyageurs.

Of the 7,000 Canadian troops deployed in the South African War, about 250 died and are listed in the book.

=== Merchant Navy ===
From the Canadian Merchant Navy, more than 570 Canadian men and women died during the First World War and more than 1600 during the Second World War. This book was dedicated in 1993.

=== 7th book, "In the Service of Canada" ===
A seventh Book of Remembrance, dedicated on November 11, 2005, lists members of the Canadian Forces who died on active duty in the service of Canada (other than those already covered by the Korean War book) since the close of the Second World War book. Unlike the others, which were designed after the end of each period of hostilities, the seventh book is ongoing and is expected to continue "for generations to come". A second volume for the 7th Book of Remembrance in currently in production.

As of 2018 the calligrapher for the 7th Book of Remembrance, Vol. I & II, was Ottawa resident Richard Draffin.

=== War of 1812 ===
In 2019, an eighth book was unveiled from the War of 1812, listing more than 1,600 dead who served in Canadian fencible or militia units, or with the forces of First Nation Crown allies, during the War of 1812.

=== Copies ===
A copy of the books for the First and Second World Wars and Korea are displayed at Canadian Memorial United Church in Vancouver, BC.
