= S. George Curry =

Canadian architect (1854–1942)

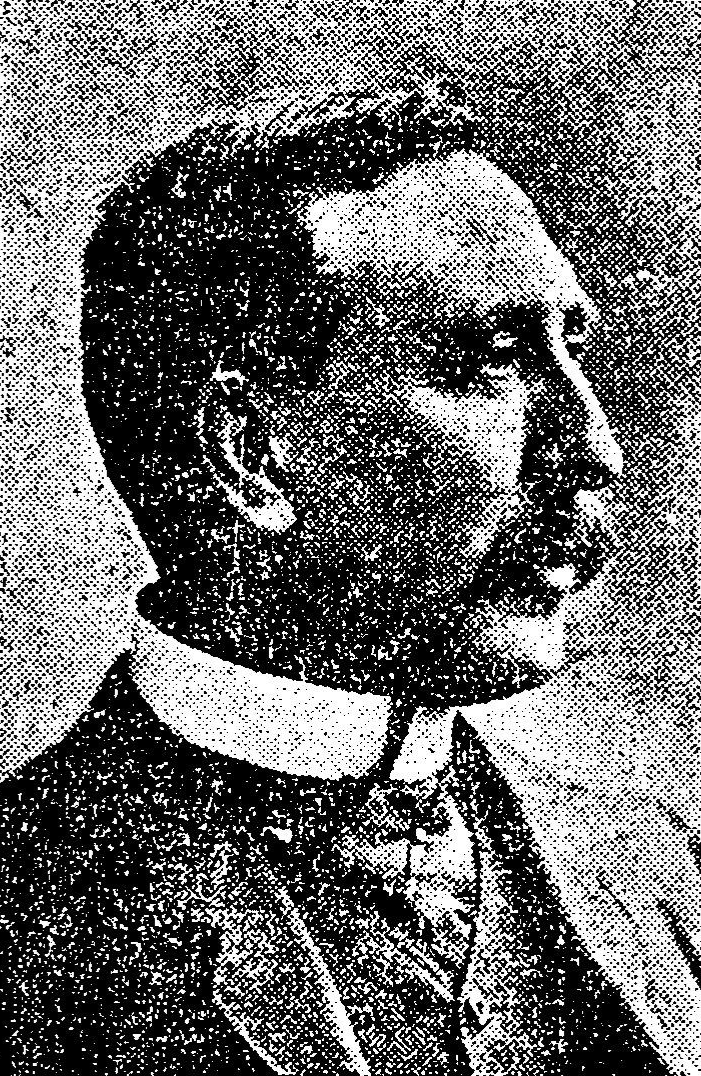
- Born: 15 July 1854; Port Hope, Ontario
- Died: 11 February 1942 (aged 87); Toronto, Ontario
- Spouse: Helen Stewart Glass (m. 1904)

Samuel George Curry RCA (15 July 1854 – 11 February 1942) was a Canadian architect who practiced in Toronto as the junior partner of several of Toronto’s leading architects, among them Frank Darling and from 1892 Darling's partner John A. Pearson, Henry Sproatt, Francis S. Baker, Ernest Rolph and W. F. Sparling.

In 1880, in partnership with Frank Darling (architect), he designed the first-place entry for the new Provincial Parliament Buildings in Toronto; through delay and politicking the design was not executed. Darling and Curry designed the former Bank of Montreal building at the corner of Yonge and Front streets (now housing the Hockey Hall of Fame) and the Victoria Hospital for Sick Children, on College Street, Toronto.

Curry, who was a member of the Toronto Architectural Guild also worked on his own, designing the John McKay Store (1898) formerly located 36 King Street West and in the 1980s relocated at 11 Adelaide Street West, to form part of Scotia Plaza. The structure is an example of Renaissance Revival style and incorporates architectural terracotta details.

Curry is also associated with a few other firms, with Francis Spence Baker as Curry and Baker, from 1895 to 1897, with William Frederick Sparling as Curry and Sparling 1909 to 1917 and on his own 1898 to 1904 and in from the 1920s to his retirement.

Curry was a member of the Royal Canadian Academy of Arts.

From 1902 to 1903 Curry was an alderman on Toronto City Council.

Curry died in 1942 in Toronto.

== Works ==
Building	Year Completed	Architect	Style	Source	Location	Image
Bank of Montreal (since 1993, location of the Hockey Hall of Fame)	1885	Frank Darling (architect) & S. George Curry	Romanesque Revival	W	Northwest corner of 30 Yonge Street and Front Street, downtown Toronto, Ontario	
The Toronto Club	1888	Frank Darling S. George Curry	Palladian, Renaissance Revival, Richardson Romanesque Style	15	107-109 Wellington Street West, Toronto, Ontario	
Victoria Hospital for Sick Children	1889-92	Frank Darling & S. George Curry	Romanesque Revival	W, 3	College Street and Elizabeth Street Toronto, Ontario	
John Kay Store - facade only	1898	S. George Curry	Renaissance Revival	15	11 Adelaide Street West, Toronto, Ontario	
St. George's Cathedral (Kingston, Ontario) -restoration after a fire	1899-1900	S. George Curry with Joseph Power	Renaissance Revival		King Street at Johnson Street, Kingston, Ontario	
Highland Arts Theatre - constructed as SYDNEY, N.S., St. Andrew's Presbyterian Church	1910-1911	Curry and Sparling	Gothic Revival		40 Bentinck Street, Sydney, Nova Scotia	

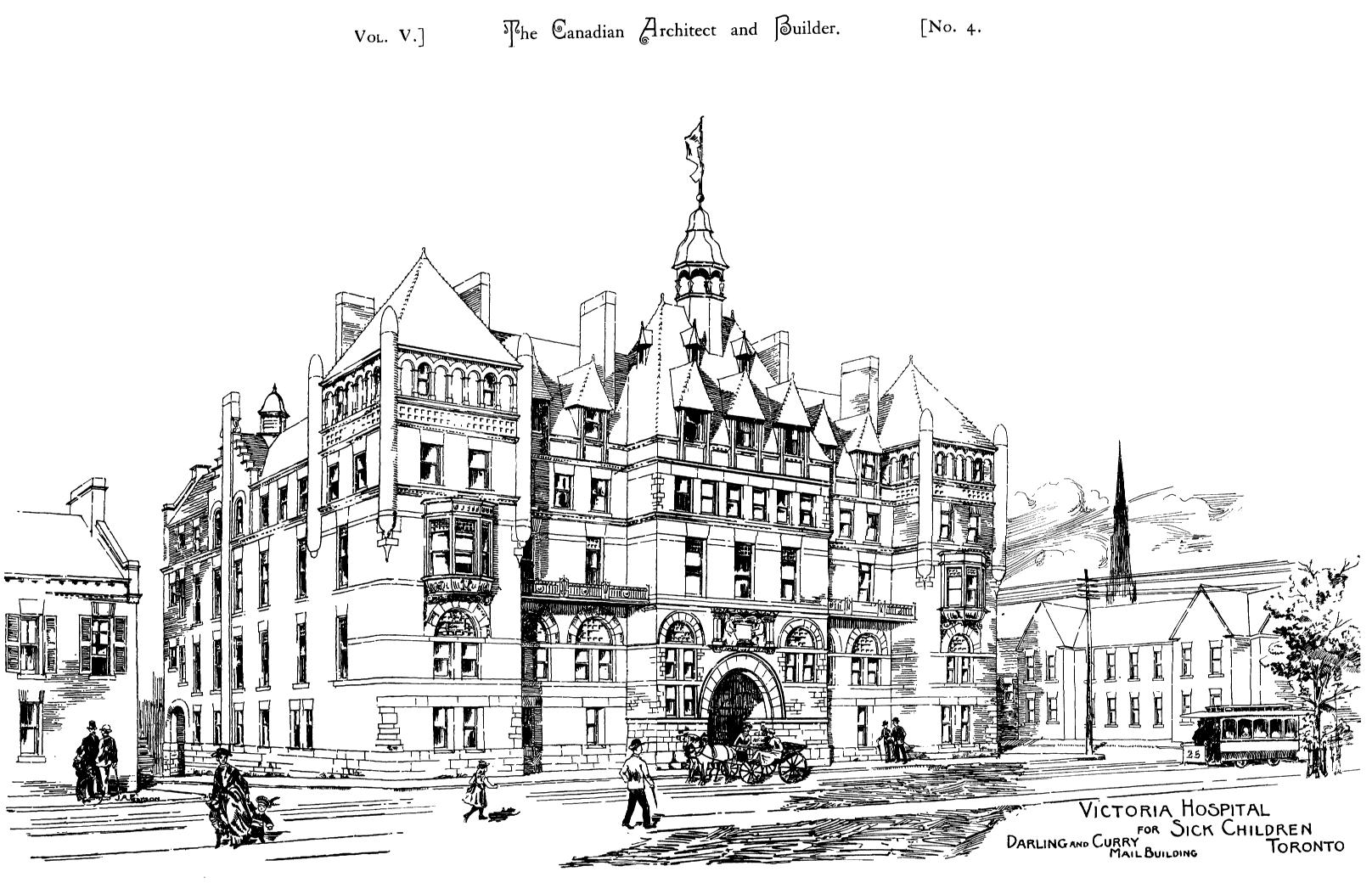
1892 architectural sketch by Frank Darling (architect) and S. George Curry of Victoria Hospital for Sick Children, Toronto, 1889–1892
