= Toronto Club =

Private club in Toronto

- Founded: March 20, 1837; 189 years ago
- Type: Private members' club
- Location: 107 Wellington Street West Toronto, Ontario, Canada
- Website: torontoclub.ca

The Toronto Club is a private members' club in Toronto, Ontario, Canada. Founded on March 20, 1837, it is the oldest private club in Canada and the third oldest in North America.

== Overview ==
The clubhouse, located at 107 Wellington Street West (at York Street), was designed by Frank Darling and S. George Curry in 1888 and opened in 1889. The building had additions and alterations between 1911 and 1912 by Darling and Pearson. The building mixes different architectural styles and marks an important transition in Darling's career. The clubhouse was recognized as a heritage property by the City of Toronto in 1984 and by the Ontario Heritage Foundation in 2002.

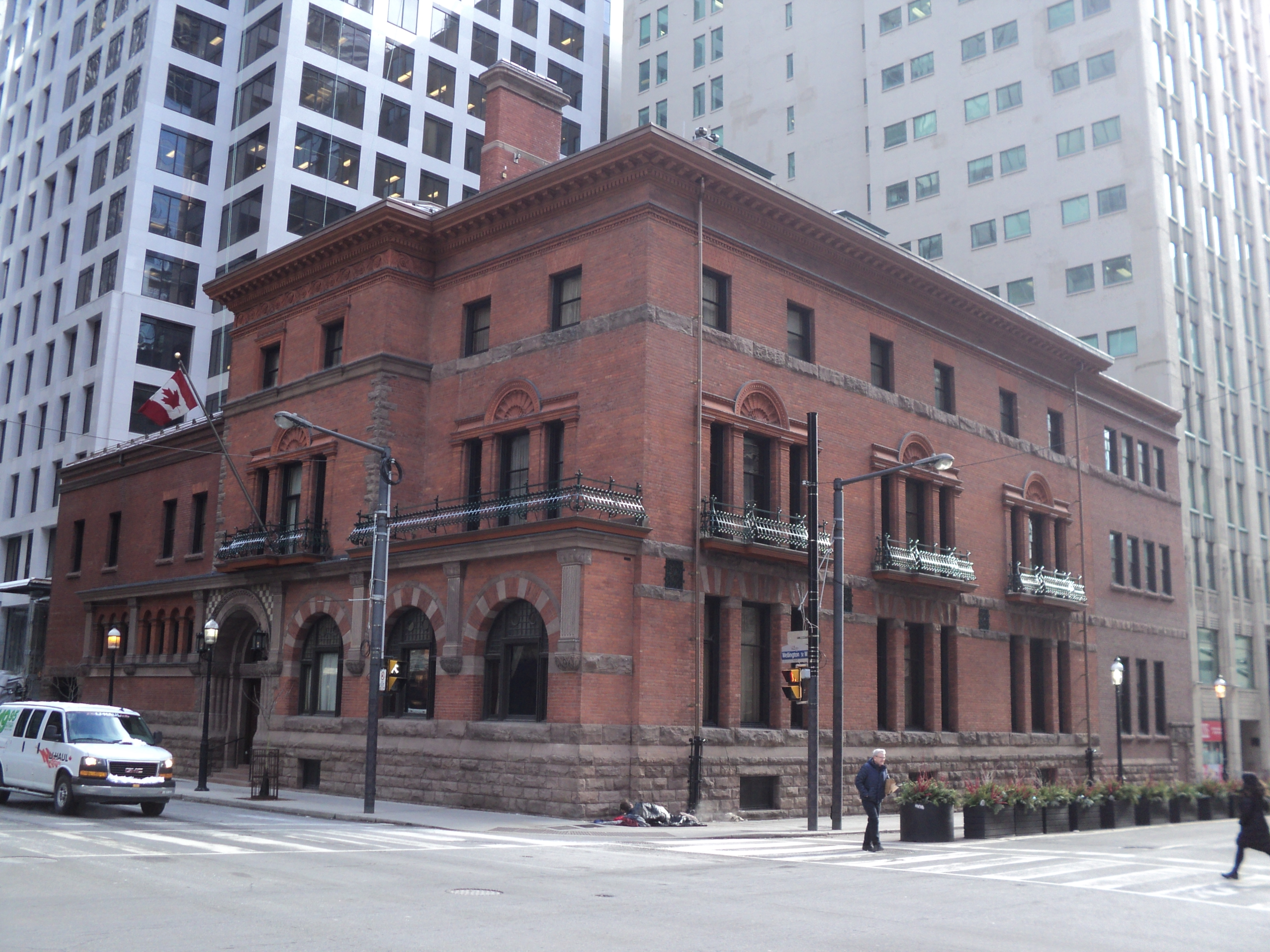
The clubhouse on Wellington Street

Membership at the Toronto Club is by invitation only and is completely gender-neutral. The Club is strictly for members and their invited guests.

The clubhouse is a 40,000 square foot, three-storey building. The facilities include four lounges, two à la carte dining rooms, a cocktail lounge, business centre and five private dining rooms.

The Club provides reciprocal privileges with a collection of distinguished clubs in the North America, Europe, and Asia.

The Club offers its members a programme of special events including: wine dinners featuring rare wines from its extensive cellar; regularly scheduled wine educational events; annual art dinners; an Annual Black-Tie Members’ Dinner at which a different distinguished member is honoured each year; high-profile guest speaker events; and a Christmas Buffet Luncheon.

== Club histories ==
- Snively, Alexander C. History of the Toronto Club, 1835–1947.
- Snively, Alexander C. Toronto Club, 1835-–1995: A History Compiled from Club Records and Contemporary Historical Notes.
- Stoffman, Daniel. Behind Carved Doors: The Toronto Club and Its Remarkable Members. Douglas & McIntyre, 2012.

== See also ==
- List of gentlemen's clubs in Canada
