= National Club =

Private club in Toronto, Ontario, Canada

- Founded: 6 July 1874
- Type: Private members' club
- Headquarters: 303 Bay Street
- Website: www.thenationalclub.com

The National Club is a private members' club founded in 1874 for business professionals located in the Financial District of Downtown Toronto, Ontario, Canada. It provides private dining and meeting facilities, as well as accommodations to its members and guests.

== History ==
The National Club was founded by Ontario Letters Patent on July 6, 1874. There were 24 members in the original roster. The National Club was created to provide a home and Toronto focus for Canada First, a nationalist movement founded in 1868 by George Denison, Henry Morgan, Charles Mair, William Foster and Robert Grant Haliburton. Canada First sought to “promote a sense of national purpose and to lay the intellectual foundations for Canadian nationality.”

On March 30, 1875, the National Club moved into rented premises on the west side of Bay Street, immediately south of the building that housed the original Toronto Stock Exchange. The Club's first president was Dr. Goldwin Smith, a prominent historian and journalist, and a supporter of the Canada First movement. His First Vice President was William Pearce Howland, the second Lieutenant Governor of Ontario. Other founders included the Hon. Edward Blake, Ontario's first premier, and Sir Oliver Mowat, Ontario's second premier.

By the 1880s, the Canada First movement virtually disappeared, and the National Club had established itself as a general business and social club for Toronto's business and political leaders of all affiliations.

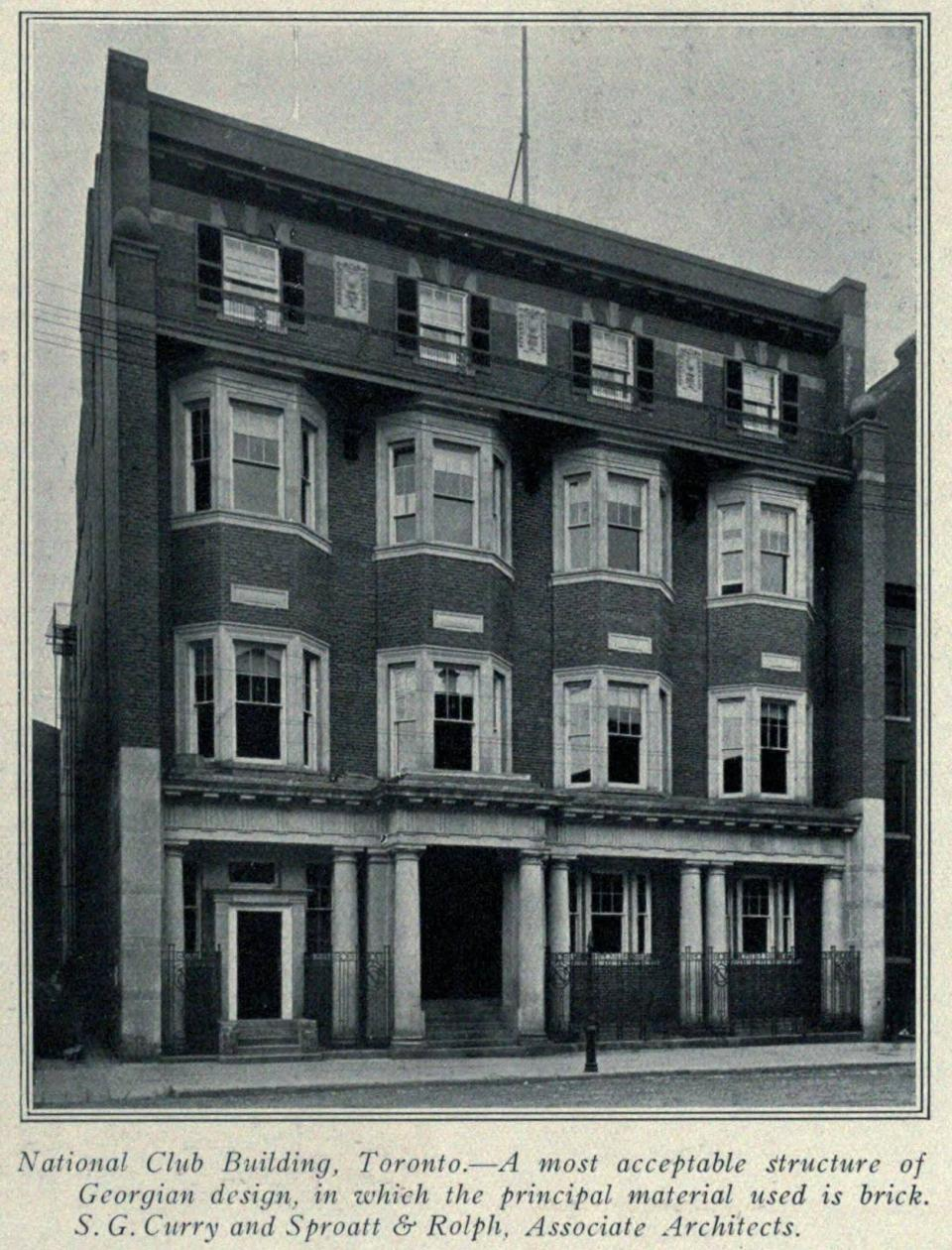
The National Club in 1909

In 1903, $50,000 of a total estimated construction cost of $90,000 was raised by subscription among National Club members to purchase a lot and build a new clubhouse at 303 Bay Street. On September 12, 1906, the cornerstone was laid and on December 17, 1907, the National Club's new premises opened. The following day, The Globe newspaper described the new premises designed by noted Toronto architect S. George Curry as “Architecturally... a triumph.”

The building is protected under Part IV of the Ontario Heritage Act since March 17, 1976, and also enjoys a heritage easement agreement since July 16, 1984. It was designed by S.G. Curry, of the Sproatt & Rolph architectural firm. The firm of Sproatt & Rolph was responsible for designing a number of other Toronto landmarks, including Hart House (University of Toronto), the Canada Life Building, the Fairmont Royal York Hotel, Bishop Strachan School, Eaton's College Street store, and the Canada Permanent Trust building across the street from the National Club. The National Club is one of the few remaining intact buildings on Bay Street from this period.

== Today ==
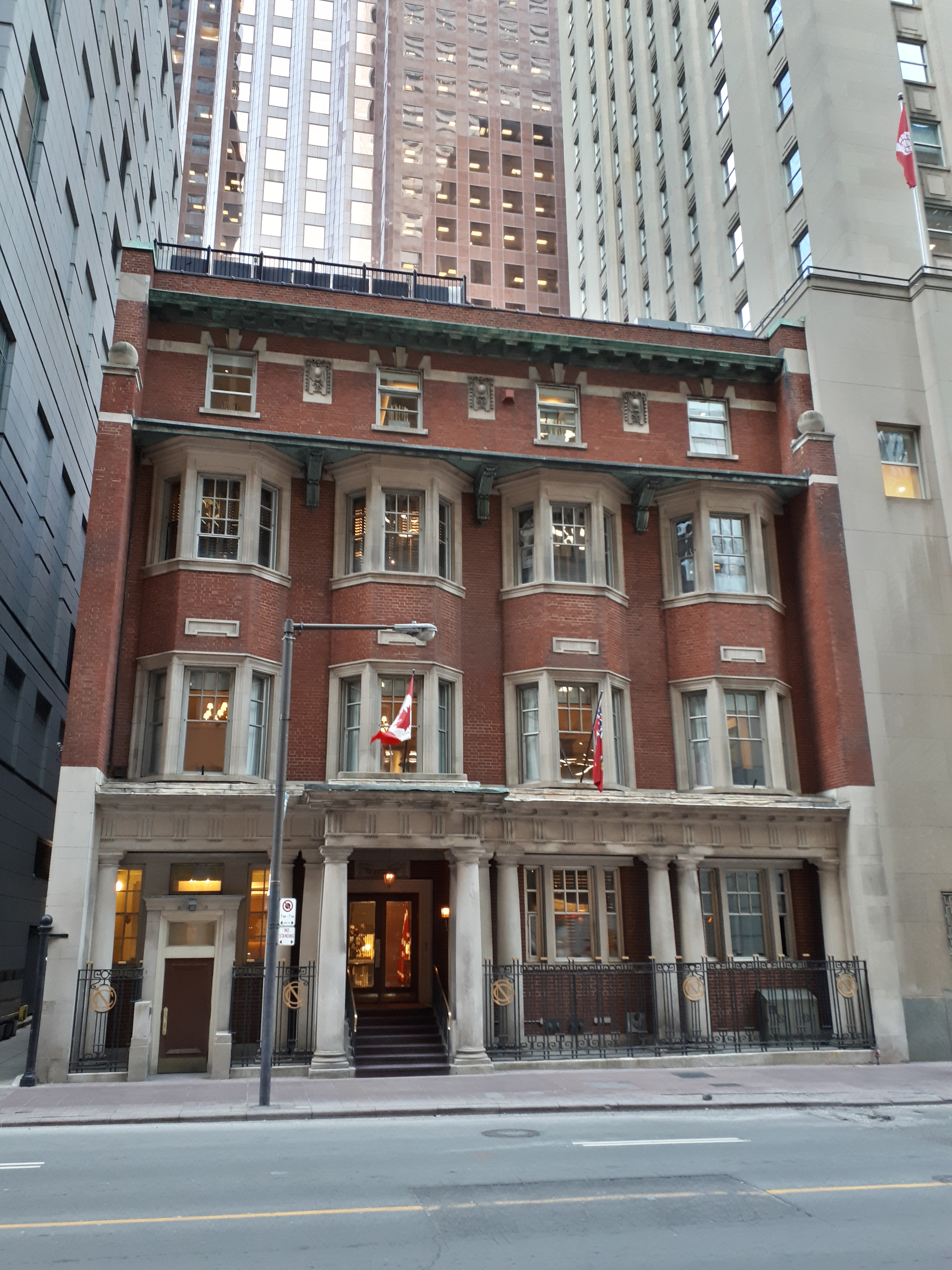
Exterior view in 2019

The National Club maintains its historic clubhouse at 303 Bay Street, composed of three large principal dining rooms, eleven private meeting rooms and three lounges. A new rooftop patio and enclosure was opened in early 2014. A major renovation was undertaken in 2017-18 that created a new bistro-style wine bar and open kitchen dining facility on the front of the 4th floor of the Club called the "1874 Bar & Grill". The National Club has six rooms of hotel-style accommodations for visiting members and guests. The red brick, four-storey Georgian building has undergone several periods of extensive internal renovation in its history to maintain both the cosmetic and mechanical aspects of the facilities. In 2014 the National Club received the "Club of the Year Award" from the Canadian Society of Club Managers.

The National Club has a significant collection of Canadian art and a wine cellar with approximately 40,000 bottles. Stained glass windows in the Main Dining Room depicting the arms of Canada and the provinces were created by the Toronto company of Pringle & London, which worked with Tiffany & Co. and also installed many of the Toronto church and cathedral stained glass windows in the late 1800s and early 1900s. The National Club is connected to the Toronto PATH system of concourses and tunnels through an unmarked door leading to the lower level of the Scotia Plaza. The National Club is affiliated with approximately 250 other private clubs in Canada and around the world, providing its members with reciprocal dining and accommodation privileges.

== Membership ==
Members must be men or women over the age of 21 years and be of good character, and be reviewed and approved by the Board of Directors. The National Club has approximately 500 resident members, in addition to members in senior, overseas and other categories. The National Club was one of the earliest Toronto private city clubs to extend full membership to women in 1992.

The membership of the former Ontario Club joined the National Club in 2010 after the lease expired on its own clubhouse in Commerce Court.

== Prominent members ==
The National Club has had on its roster a number of noted Canadians, including many national and provincial politicians. Sir Wilfrid Laurier, the seventh prime minister of Canada, was an early member and sat for a portrait after opening the current clubhouse in 1907. Others include:

- The Hon. Lincoln Alexander, 24th Lieutenant Governor of Ontario
- Joseph E. Atkinson, founder of the Toronto Star newspaper
- Wilfrid Dinnick, developer of Toronto's Lawrence Park Estates
- Timothy Eaton, founder of Eaton's department stores
- Gerhardt Heintzman, founder of piano manufacturer Heintzman & Co.
- JP Hynes, architect responsible for the design of the Hotel Victoria (originally Hotel Mossop)
- E. J. Lennox, architect responsible for the design of Old City Hall, Casa Loma and King Edward Hotel
- Henry Patten, General Manager of Toronto Transportation Commission
- Robert Simpson, founder of Simpson's department stores
- Fred Smye, President of aircraft manufacturer Avro Canada

== Grant of arms ==
In 1996, the National Club was granted its own arms and flag by the Canadian Heraldic Authority.

== Presidents ==
- 1875-76 – Dr. Goldwin Smith
- 1877 – Sir William P. Howland
- 1878 – Dr. Goldwin Smith
- 1879-82 – The Hon. Adam Crooks
- 1883-84 – Col. George T. Denison
- 1885-86 – Alexander Manning
- 1887-89 – Hugh Blain
- 1890-91 – Barlow Cumberland
- 1892 – John Akers
- 1893-96 – Frank Arnoldi, Q.C.
- 1897-1900 – W. K. McNaught
- 1901-02 – John F. Ellis
- 1903-05 – Col. Noel G. L. Marshall
- 1906-07 – W. K. George
- 1908-09 – G. T. Irving
- 1910-11 – William Stone
- 1912-13 – W. P. Gundy
- 1914-15 – A. L. Malone
- 1916 – R. Southam
- 1917 – R. S. Gourlay
- 1918-19 – S. Casey Wood, K.C.
- 1920 – F. A. Rolph
- 1921-22 – G. E. Scroggie
- 1923-24 – John Turnbull
- 1925-26 – C. B. McNaught
- 1927-28 – E. G. Long, K.C.
- 1929-30 – John Westren
- 1931-32 – C. E. Abbs
- 1933-34 – Brig.-Gen. C. H. Mitchell, C.B., C.M.G., D.S.O.
- 1935-36 – J. J. Gibbons
- 1937-38 – T. W. Jull
- 1939 – F. Erichsen-Brown, K.C.
- 1940 – J. M. Lalor
- 1941 – J. T. Richardson, K.C.
- 1942 – J. Y. Murdoch, K.C., LL.D.
- 1943 – E. W. Bickle
- 1944 – E. C. Fox, LL.D.
- 1945 – H. J. Coon
- 1946 – William Zimmerman, K.C.
- 1947 – H. R. Stephenson
- 1948 – H. B. Housser
- 1949 – Robert Lynch Stailing
- 1950 – W. G. Malcolm
- 1951 – J. A. Northey
- 1952 – D. A. Y. Merrick
- 1953 – W. W. McLaughlin, Q.C.
- 1954 – S. A. Duke
- 1955 – E. H. Dickinson
- 1956 – A. P. Jewett, O.B.E.
- 1957 – J. A. Scythes
- 1958 – L. J. McGowan
- 1959 – H. P. Herington, F.C.A.
- 1960 – R. G. Meech, Q.C.
- 1961 – H. T. O’Neil
- 1962 – A. J. Mylrea
- 1963 – H. H. Webb, M.B.E.
- 1964 – W. W. Parry, Q.C.
- 1965 – W. Dent Smith, LL.D.
- 1966 – John F. Ellis, M.B.E.
- 1967 – W. P. Freyseng
- 1968 – John E. Langdon
- 1969 – J. D. MacFarlane, M.B.E.
- 1970 – Oakah L. Jones
- 1971 – J. G. Housser, M.C., E.D.
- 1972 – Murray Bosley
- 1973 – W. Grant Ross
- 1974 – J. S. Deacon
- 1975 – F. R. Hume, Q.C.
- 1976 – C. Gordon Page
- 1977 – A. R. Marchment, F.C.A.
- 1978 – D. W. Morrison, D.F.C.
- 1979 – W. H. Broadhurst, F.C.A.
- 1980 – R. C. Meech, Q.C.
- 1981 – G. W. Woods, F.C.A.
- 1982 – E. J. Mannion
- 1983 – S. E. Eagles, D.C.L.
- 1984 – M. A. Hasley
- 1985 – J. Chisholm Lyons, Q.C.
- 1986 – R. G. Stackhouse, F.C.A.
- 1987 – R. H. Hawkes, Q.C.
- 1988 – E. B. Heyland
- 1989 – Peter P. Biggs
- 1990 – R. E. MacKay, F.C.A.
- 1991 – W. B. Boggs
- 1992 – R. E. Lint
- 1993 – J. A. Black
- 1994 – J. A. Bradshaw, Q.C.
- 1995 – M. J. O’Leary
- 1996 – Roger A. Lindsay, of Craighall
- 1997 – Hugh H. Turnbull
- 1998 – George A. Fierheller, C.M., B.A., LL.D.
- 1999 – L. Diane Woodruff
- 2000 – John M. McGuire
- 2001 – The Honourable Mr. Justice Randall Scott Echlin
- 2002 – Eric Stevenson
- 2003 – Col. Blake C. Goldring, C.F.A., LL.D.
- 2004 – Catherine Lyons
- 2005 – Stephen LeDrew
- 2006 – Pamela P. Jeffery
- 2007 – Ed Burns
- 2008 – Joseph J. Markson
- 2009 – Daniel N. Argiros
- 2010 – T. John Quinn
- 2011 – P. Lee Fisher
- 2012 – Norman F. Torrie
- 2013 – Stephen J. Lautens
- 2014 – Bruce Bowser
- 2015 – Sean Hoehn
- 2016 – Craig Smith
- 2017-18 – Winnie Lindy Go
- 2019-20 – Michael A. Dignam
- 2021 – Malcolm MacKillop
- 2022 – Kathy Steffan
- 2023 – Marc Mercier

== See also ==
- List of gentlemen's clubs in Canada
