= Frank Darling (architect) =

Canadian architect (1850–1923)

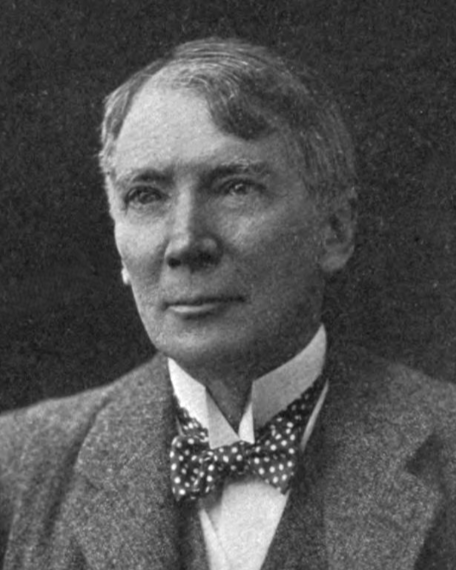
- Born: 17 February 1850; Scarborough Township, Province of Canada
- Died: 19 May 1923 (aged 73); Toronto, Ontario, Canada
- Education: Trinity College School, Weston
- Occupation: Architect
- Awards: Royal Institute of British Architects Gold Medal, 1915
- Practice: Toronto

Frank Darling (17 February 1850 – 19 May 1923) was an Canadian architect, winner of the RIBA Gold medal in 1915, who designed many of Toronto's landmark institutional and financial buildings, as well as scores of bank branches throughout the country. Darling is best described as an 'Edwardian imperialist' in his outlook and architectural approach, and accordingly left a legacy of fine Edwardian Baroque buildings in Canada's major cities, representative of the period's prosperity and optimism.

== Early life and education ==
Born in Scarborough Township in the Province of Canada, Darling was the son of the rector of St Margaret’s Anglican Church (in-the Pines) in West Hill and Christ Church of Scarborough Village, and later of the Church of the Holy Trinity in Toronto William Stewart Darling (1818-1886) and Jane Parson (1816-1909). As a boy, he received his general education at Upper Canada College before entering Trinity College School, in Weston. He worked briefly as a bank teller before becoming apprenticed to architect Henry Langley from 1866 to 1870. He studied and trained in England under George Edmund Street between 1870 and 1873 and then returned to Canada.

== Career ==
Apart from two brief solo periods in the 1870s, he practised with a series of collaborators:

- Henry MacDougall, 1873–74;
- Samuel George Curry (1855–1942 ), principal in Darling & Curry – 1880–90, in Darling, Curry & Co. - 1891, and in Darling, Curry, Sproatt & Pearson -1892;
- Henry Sproatt (1866–1934), principal in Darling, Curry & Co. -1891, in Darling, Curry Sproatt & Pearson – 1892, in Darling, Sproatt & Pearson 1892–95, and later draughtsman for Darling & Pearson – 1896,-97; and finally
- John A. Pearson (1867–1940), principal in Darling, Curry & Co. - 1891, in Darling, Curry, Sproatt & Pearson- 1892; in Darling, Sproatt & Pearson- 1892–95, and in Darling & Pearson – 1895–1937, after Darling' s death in 1923.

In 1897 Darling formed his most long-lasting architectural partnership with John A.Pearson, named Darling and Pearson. This firm lasted beyond Darling's death in 1923. The firms in which he was a partnership influenced commercial development in Toronto during the 1910s to 1920s.

Darling was the first Honorary President of the Toronto Beaux-Arts Club, member of the Holt Commission for planning of Ottawa (1913–1915), and was the first Canadian to win the Royal Institute of British Architects Gold Medal in 1915.

Darling died in 1923 and was buried at St. John's Cemetery Norway in Toronto.

== Major works ==
Building	Year Completed	Location	Notes	Image
Bank of Montreal	1886	Northwest corner of Yonge Street and Front Street, Toronto	In the Renaissance Revival style by Frank Darling & S. George Curry. Now home to the Hockey Hall of Fame.	
The Toronto Club	1888	107-109 Wellington Street West, Toronto	In the Palladian, Renaissance Revival, and Richardson Romanesque styles by Frank Darling & S. George Curry.	
Victoria Hospital for Sick Children	1889–92	67 College Street, Toronto	In the Romanesque Revival style by Frank Darling & S. George Curry.	
"Holwood" (Flavelle House)	1902	78 Queen's Park, University of Toronto St. George campus, Toronto	Monumental Edwardian residence for industrialist Sir Joseph Flavelle by Darling and Pearson. Now used by the University of Toronto's Faculty of Law.	
Convocation Hall	1907	31 King's College Circle, University of Toronto St. George campus, Toronto	Edwardian Baroque.	
University of Toronto Faculty of Applied Science and Engineering Sandford Fleming Building	1907	10 King's College Road, University of Toronto St. George campus, Toronto	Edwardian Classicism.	
South wing of the University of Toronto Sigmund Samuel Building	1912	7 King's College Circle, University of Toronto St. George campus, Toronto		
Arts Building, University of Alberta	1915	11487 89 Avenue, Edmonton, Alberta	In the Neoclassical style by Percy Erskine Nobbs & Frank Darling.	
Toronto General Hospital College Street Wing	1919	101 College Street, Toronto	Edwardian Classicism. Now part of the MaRS Discovery District.	

For projects after the formation of Darling, S. George Curry, Sproatt, & Pearson in 1892, see Darling and Pearson.

== See also ==
- Darling and Pearson
- Henry Sproatt – partnered with Darling from 1893 to 1896
