= Henry Sproatt =

Canadian architect

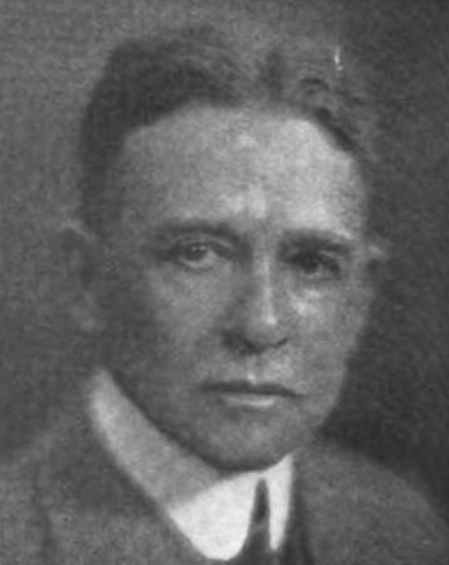
- Born: June 14, 1866; Toronto, Canada West
- Died: October 4, 1934 (aged 68); Toronto, Ontario
- Occupation: Architect
- Practice: Sproatt & Rolph

Henry Sproatt (June 14, 1866 – October 4, 1934) was a Canadian architect who was prominent during the early 20th century. Born in Toronto, he trained in Europe and in New York City.

He formed a partnership in 1890 with another celebrated architect, John A. Pearson, and with Frank Darling in 1893. Sproatt parted ways in 1896 and formed a new firm in 1899 with Ernest Ross Rolph (1871–1958), named Sproatt & Rolph.

Sproatt was a Fellow of the Royal Institute of British Architects, and he died in Toronto in 1934. The firm continued under Ernest Rolph until 1942 and was then taken over by his son, Charles Beverley Sproatt (1896–1976), from 1958 until 1970.

In recognition of his architectural achievements the University of Toronto conferred the honorary degree of Doctor of Laws to Sproatt in 1920.

== Notable projects ==
Building	Year Completed	Architect	Style	Source	Location	Image
Victoria College	1910	Henry Sproatt	Neo-Gothic	15, W	91 Charles Street West, University of Toronto, St. George campus	
Hart House	1911–24	Henry Sproatt – Engineer Ernest Rolph	Collegiate Gothic	15, W	7 Hart House Circle, University of Toronto, St. George campus	Hart House (1919)
National Club	1906	Henry Sproatt	Edwardian Classicism		303 Bay Street, Toronto	National Club, Toronto
North wing of the Chester D. Massey House	1907	Henry Sproatt	Neo-Gothic		519 Jarvis Street, Toronto	
Bishop Strachan School	1912	Henry Sproatt	Neo-Gothic		298 Lonsdale Road, Toronto	Bishop Strachan School, Toronto
Burwash Hall	1911–13	Henry Sproatt	Neo-Gothic		70 Charles Street West, Victoria College, University of Toronto, St. George campus	Burwash Hall, Toronto, 1913
Ontario Club	1913	Henry Sproatt	Neo-Gothic		Wellington Street West at Jordan Street, Toronto	
Royal Canadian Yacht Club	1920–1922	Sproatt and Rolph			2 Chippewa Avenue, Toronto Island, Toronto	Royal Canadian Yacht Club, Toronto, 1920–1922
Soldiers' Tower	1924	Henry Sproatt	Neo-Gothic		7 Hart House Circle and Tower Road, Toronto	Soldiers' Tower, University of Toronto, Toronto
Manulife South Tower	1926	Henry Sproatt	Neo-Gothic 56 M, 14 stories		200 Bloor Street East, Toronto	Manulife South Tower
Thistletown Regional Centre	1927–1928	Henry Sproatt	Modern Classical		51 Panorama Court, Etobicoke	
College Park	1928–1929	Henry Sproatt	Moderne Classicism		424 Yonge Street, Toronto	College Park, Toronto
Canada Permanent Trust Building	1930	Henry Sproatt	Neo-Gothic 77 Meters, 18 stories		320 Bay Street, Toronto	Canada Permanent Trust Building, Toronto
Fairmont Royal York Hotel (with architects Ross and Macdonald)	1929	Henry Sproatt	Château style		100 Front Street West, Toronto	Fairmont Royal York, Toronto
Canada Life Building	1931	Henry Sproatt	87 Meters, 15 stories		330 University Avenue, Toronto	Canada Life Building, Toronto
National Research Council (Canada) Laboratories,	1932	Henry Sproatt			100 Sussex Drive, Ottawa, Ontario	National Research Council (Canada) Laboratories
Knox Presbyterian Church	1932	Henry Sproatt	Neo-Gothic		120 Lisgar Street, Ottawa	Knox Presbyterian Church (Ottawa), Ottawa
Emmanuel College, Toronto	1932	Henry Sproatt	Neo-Gothic		75 Queen's Park Crescent East, Toronto	Emmanuel College, Toronto, Toronto
Princess Margaret Hospital (Toronto)	1935	Henry Sproatt	72 Meters, 18 stories		610 University Avenue, Toronto	Princess Margaret Hospital (Toronto), Toronto

Cultural offices
Preceded by George Horne Russell	President of the Royal Canadian Academy of Arts; 1926–1929	Succeeded by Wylie Grier
