= Peace Tower =

Bell and clock tower in Ottawa, Canada

- Tour de la Paix
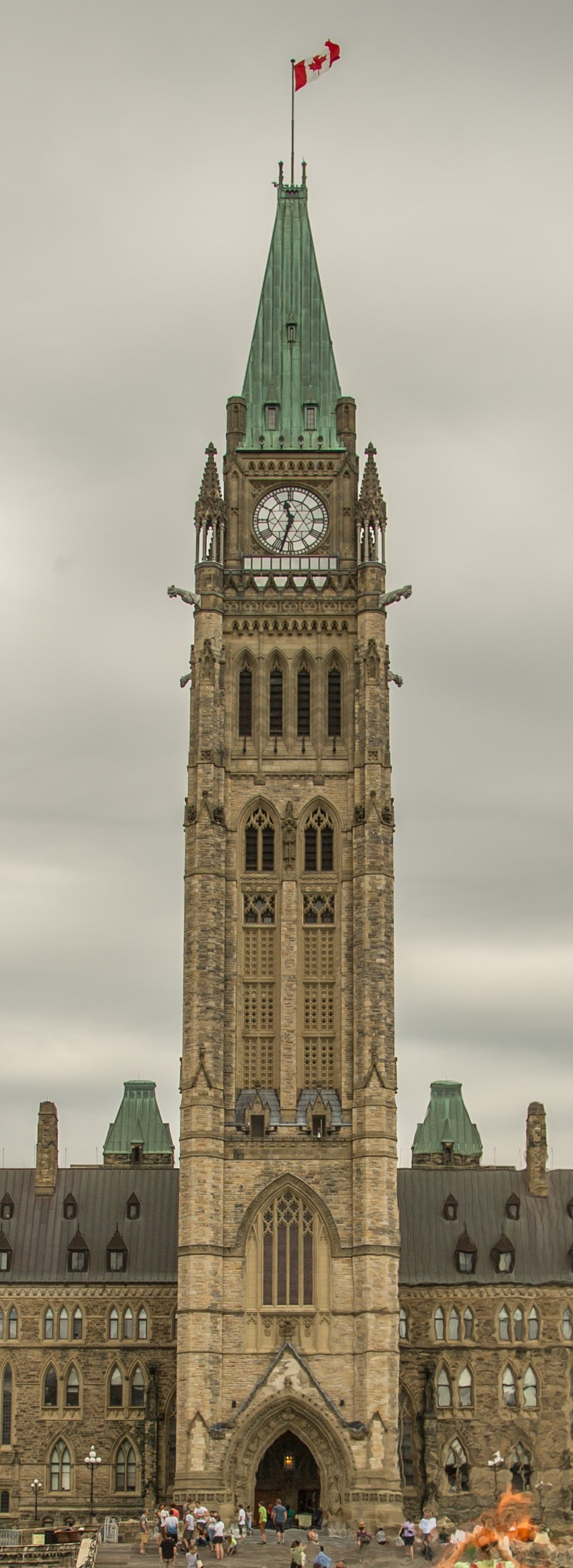
- Main facade in 2014

General information
- Type: Tower
- Architectural style: Perpendicular Gothic
- Location: Ottawa, Ontario, Canada
- Coordinates: 45.4248°N 75.6996°W
- Completed: 1922

Height
- Height: 98 m (322 ft)

Technical details
- Lifts/elevators: 1 (previously 2)

Design and construction
- Architects: Jean Omer Marchand and John A. Pearson

The Peace Tower (French: Tour de la Paix) is a focal bell and clock tower sitting on the central axis of the Centre Block of the Canadian parliament buildings in Ottawa, Ontario. The present incarnation replaced the 55-metre (180 ft) Victoria Tower, after the latter burned down in 1916, along with most of the Centre Block; only the Library of Parliament survived. It serves as a Canadian icon and had been featured prominently on the Canadian twenty-dollar bill, directly adjacent to the depiction of Queen Elizabeth II, until the change to polymer.

== Characteristics ==
Designed by Jean Omer Marchand and John A. Pearson, the tower is a campanile whose height reaches 92.2 m (302 ft 6 in), over which are arranged a multitude of stone carvings, including approximately 370 gargoyles, grotesques, and friezes, keeping with the Victorian High Gothic style of the rest of the parliamentary complex. The walls are of Nepean sandstone and the roof is of reinforced concrete covered with copper.

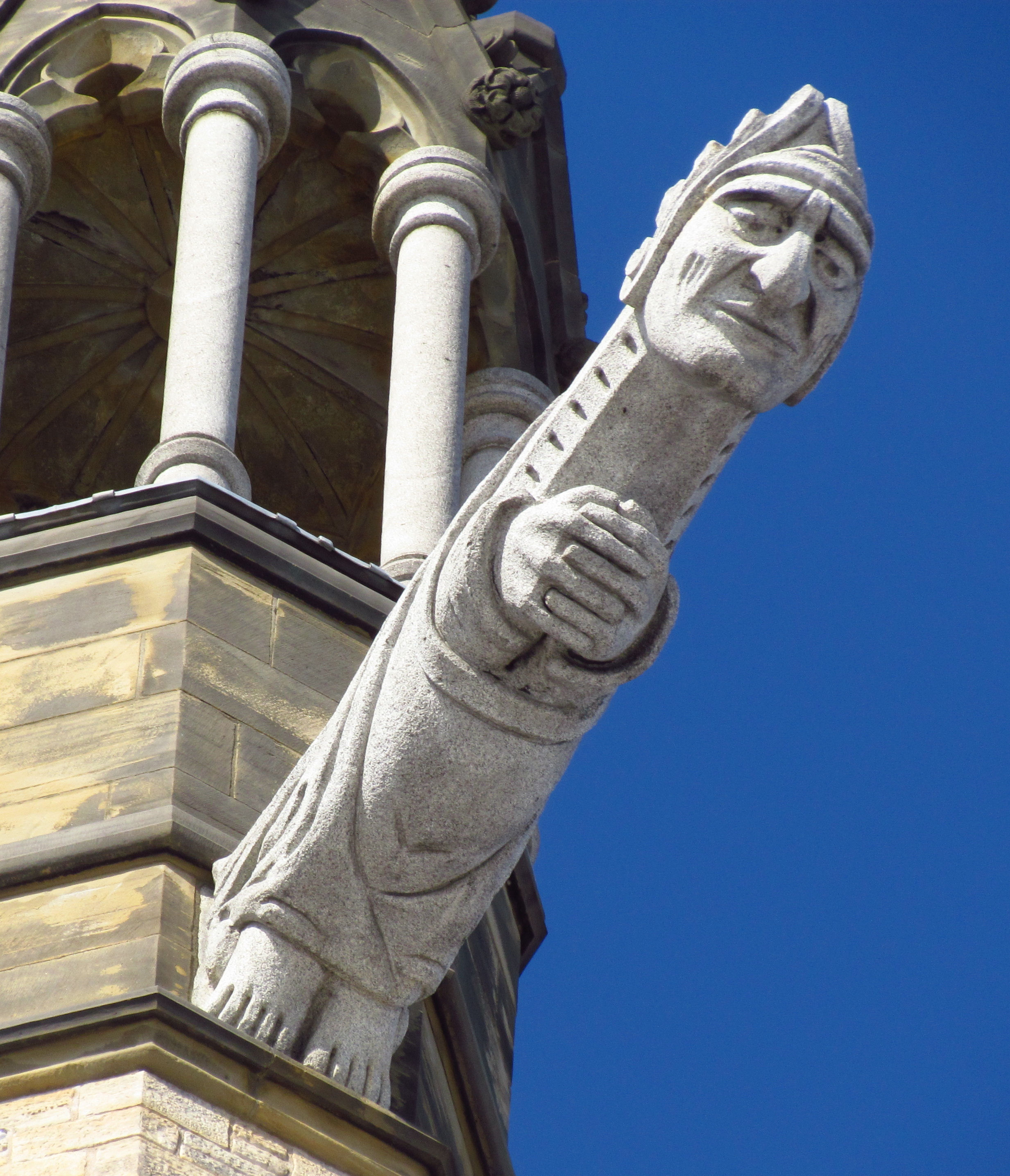
One of four grotesques at the corners of the Peace Tower

At its base is a porte-cochère within four equilateral pointed arches, the north of which frames the main entrance of the Centre Block, and the jambs of the south adorned by the supporters of the Royal Arms of Canada. Near the apex, just below the steeply pitched roof, are the tower's 4.8 m (16 ft) diameter clock faces, one on each of the four facades. The mechanical workings of the timepiece were manufactured by the Verdin Company and are set by the National Research Council Time Signal. One level below, running around the circumference of the tower's shaft, is an observation deck. This was the highest accessible space in Ottawa until the early 1970s; the Peace Tower dominated the Ottawa skyline, as a strict 45.7 m (150 ft) height limit was placed on other buildings. That limit, however, was later rescinded, leading the Peace Tower to lose its distinction as the city's tallest structure. Cantilevered out at each of the four corners of the tower, at the level of the observation platform, are four 2.5 m (8 ft 4 in) long, 75 cm (2 ft 6 in) high, and 45 cm (1 ft 6 in) thick gargoyles made of Stanstead grey granite from Beebe, Quebec.

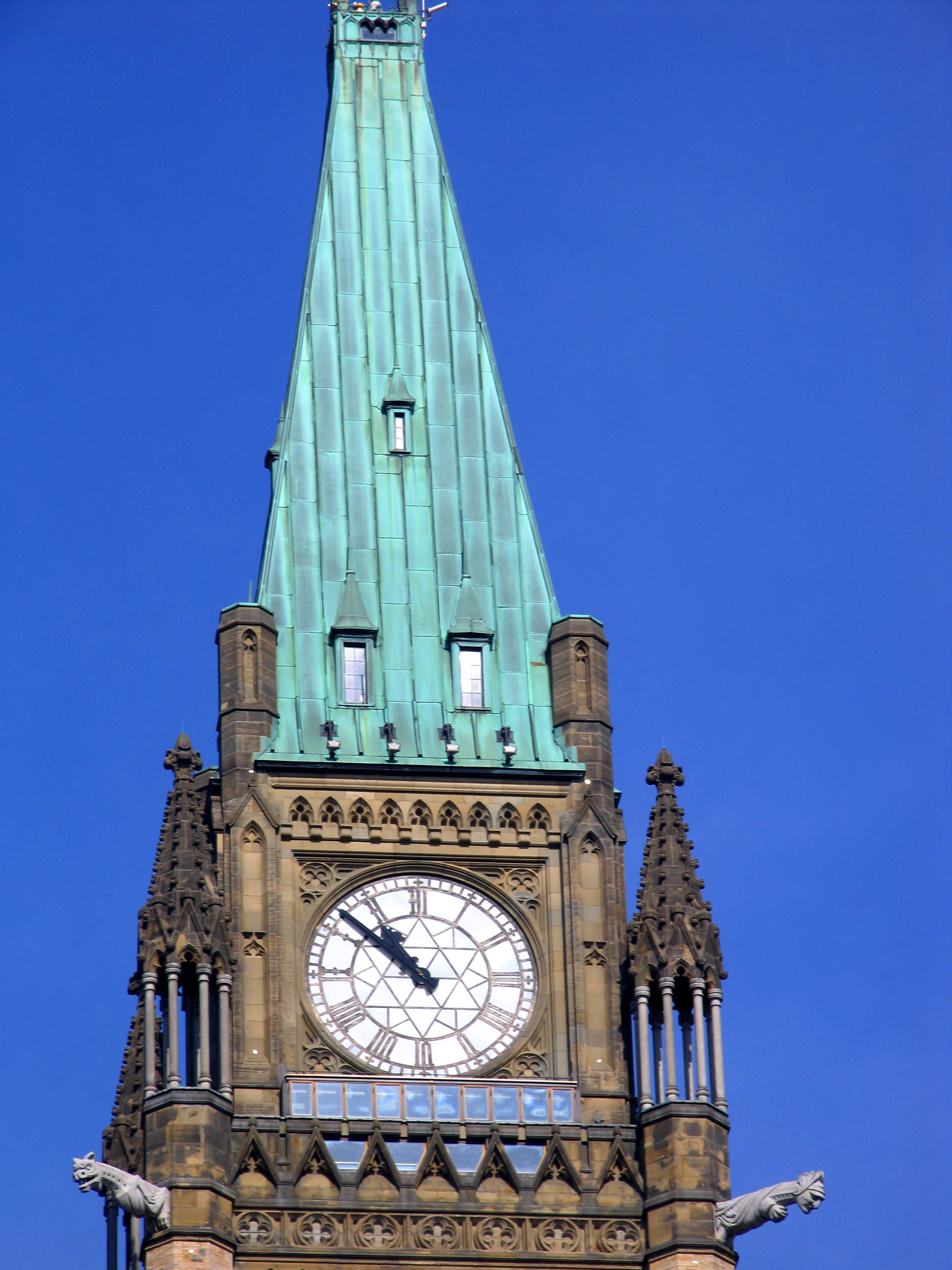
South clock face and the glass windows of the observation deck below

The tower's flagpole holds symbolic significance, acting as the flagpole of the nation. As such, strict protocol surrounds the display of banners atop the Peace Tower, such as half-masting for national mourning and showing the flag of the sovereign, that of any member of the royal family, or the flag of the governor general, when any of those persons are present on Parliament Hill. In 2009, the Parliament Hill property manager, Brian Cook, stated that he has seen the flag flown upside down once due to human error. Although the flag was initially changed once per week, the Department of Public Works began changing it every day starting in 1998. The retired flags are mailed free of charge to citizens on a waiting list to receive one. By 2014, the backlog had reached a 42-year waiting time. By 2026, that backlog had increased to over 100 years.

In 1981, a new inclined elevator was installed. It travels on a 10° angle for the first 98 feet (30 m), shifting its position horizontally 12 feet 2.25 inches (3.715 m), and straight up for the 60-foot-9-inch (18.52 m) remainder of the climb. The elevator car stays level at all times during its movement because it has a gimbal-mounted double frame. Before the installation of the new elevator, the observatory had been reached by taking first one elevator, then climbing a flight of stairs to a second elevator.

=== Memorial Chamber ===
The Peace Tower was designed by architect John A. Pearson not only to stand as an architectural feature and landmark, but also to function as a memorial to Canadians who had given their lives during the Great War. It thus houses the Memorial Chamber, a vaulted 7.3 m by 7.3 m (24 ft by 24 ft) room directly above the porte-cochere, with stained glass windows and various other features illustrating Canada's war record, such as the brass plates made from spent shell casings found on battlefields that were inlaid into the floor, and bore the name of each of Canada's major conflicts during the First World War. Stone that architect John Pearson personally collected from the main European battlefields where Canadians were killed is included in the floors and walls. Pearson described the room, also called the Memorial Chapel, as a "sacred grove in the middle of the forest."

The stone walls were originally to have been inscribed with the names of all Canada's servicemen and women who had died during the First World War; but, without enough space for all 66,000 names, it was later decided to place Books of Remembrance there instead; the books list all Canadian soldiers, airmen, and seamen who died in service of the Crown—whether that of Britain (before 1931) or that of Canada (after 1931)—or allied countries in foreign wars, including the War of 1812, the Nile Expedition and Boer War, the First World War, the Second World War, and the Korean War. The eight books are displayed in glass cases on seven altars around the chamber, the pages of each book turned at 11 a.m. daily so every name is on display to visitors at least once during each calendar year.

Amidst the carved marble plaques detailing Canadian military involvement since Confederation, five marble plaques on display in the Memorial Room present literary passages. Two plaques contain (in English and French) "In Flanders Fields" by Canadian physician Lieutenant-Colonel John McCrae. One plaque has an excerpt from French-Canadian author Gabrielle Roy's novel Bonheur d'occasion (The Tin Flute). Psalm 139:8-10 from the Bible is etched on another plaque in both French and English. A fifth plaque is inscribed with the moving poem "On Going to the Wars" by Canadian writer Earle Birney:

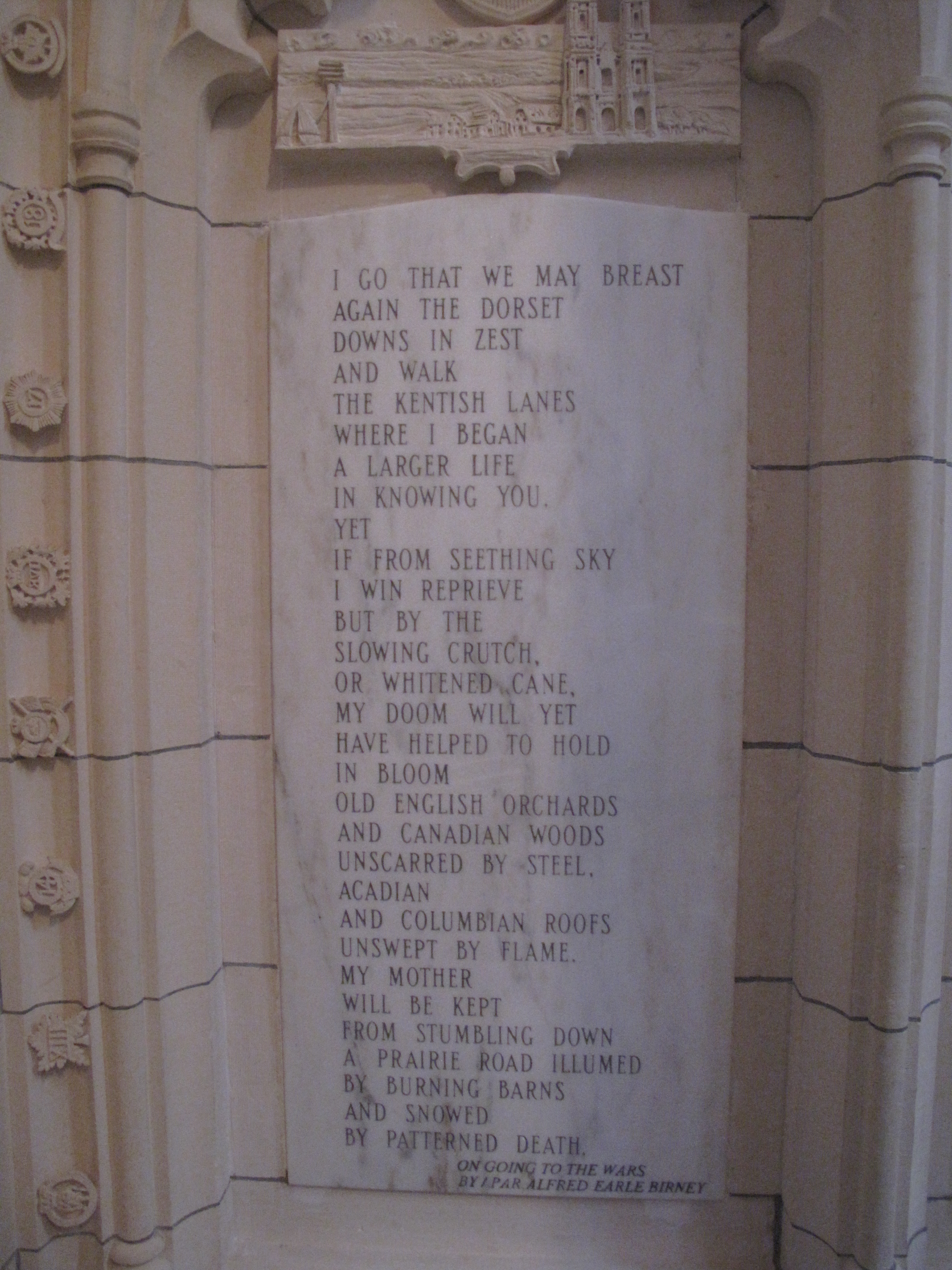
"On Going to the Wars" by Earle Birney, from the Memorial Chamber in the Peace Tower

I go that we may breast
again the Dorset
downs in zest
and walk
the Kentish lanes
where I began
a larger life
in knowing you.
Yet
if from seething sky
I win reprieve
but by the
slowing crutch
or whitened cane,
my doom will yet
have helped to hold
in bloom
old English orchards
and Canadian woods
unscarred by steel,
Acadian
and Columbian roofs
unswept by flame.
My mother
will be kept
from stumbling down
a prairie road illumed
by burning barns
and snowed
by patterned death.

==== Sculpture ====
Various elements within the room were formed with stone quarried from the battlefields of Europe: from the United Kingdom came Hopton Wood Stone; from Belgium, black marble for the wall plinths and altar steps, as well as St. Anne marble for the clustered columns that support the fan vault ceiling from each corner of the room; and from France, Château-Gaillard stone for the walls and the vault itself, as well as stone from Flanders' fields. These materials were worked into 700 carved elements by a number of different artists and sculptors under the direction of Ira Lake, who desired to tell not only the complete story of Canada's participation in the First World War, but also to commemorate military units as far back as the 17th century regime of New France.

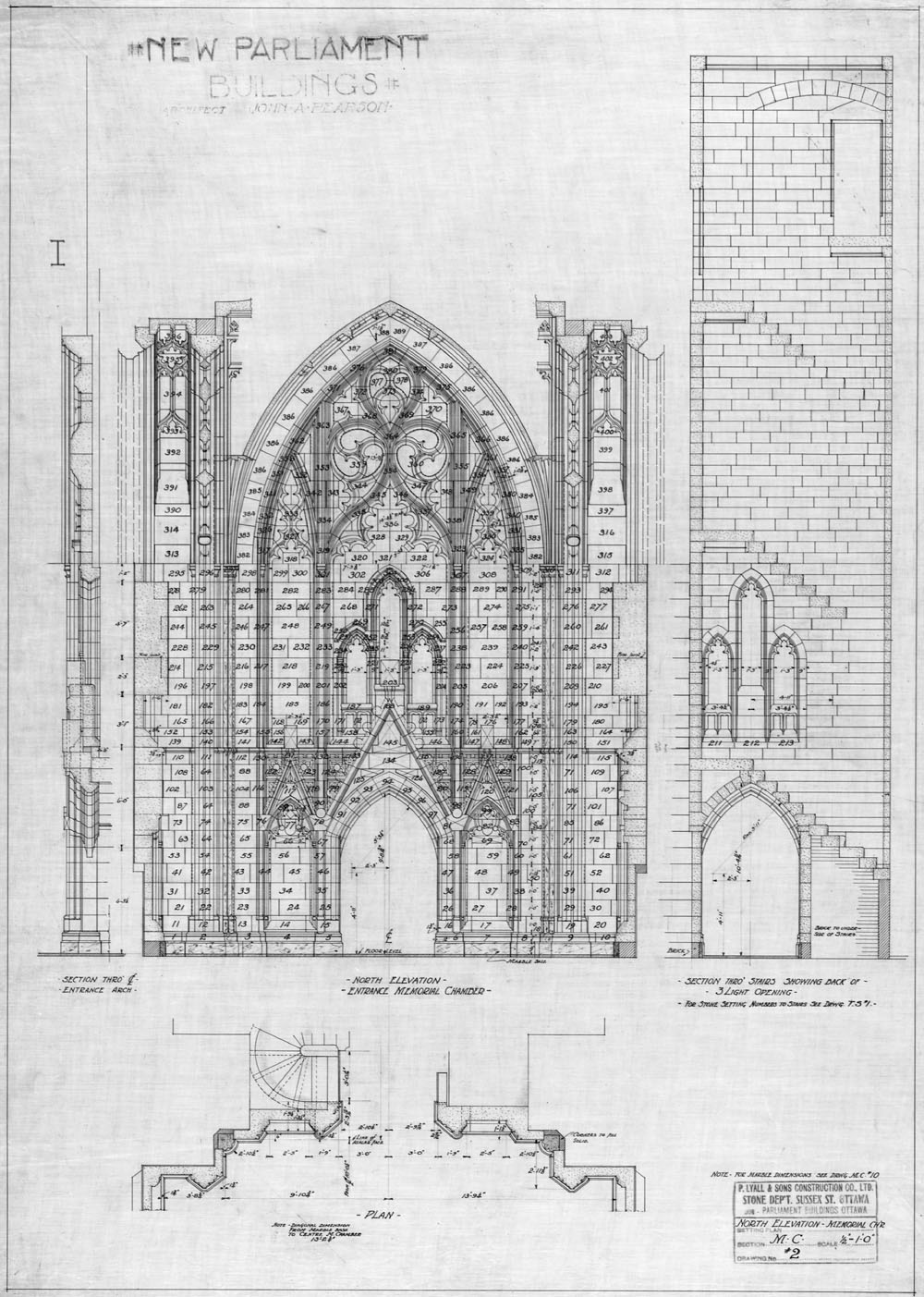
John Pearson's drawings for the new Centre Block of Parliament Hill, showing a section through the Memorial Chamber with elevation of the north wall and the staircase that rises behind it

Around the entrance archway are The Sword of Victory—a bas-relief above the opening—and two stone lions by Pearson, the modeller Charles Adamson, and the sculptor Cléophas Soucy, each bearing a shield; the shield to the left bears the Dragon of Destruction and the date 1914, while that on the right shows the Dove of Peace perched on a crown and the date 1918. Within the tympanum of the antechamber's arch is the sculpted work by Pearson and Soucy, The Tunnellers' Friends, which shows representations of animals that served during the war: reindeer, pack mules, carrier pigeons, horses, dogs, canaries, and mice, all above the inscription "The tunnellers' friends, the humble beasts that served and died". Around the archivolt at the other end of the entrance passage are sculpted animals and insects, such as beetles, spiders, lizards, butterflies, rats, hares, bats, birds, frogs, and bees; John Pearson stated that these were to represent the flora and fauna of Canada. The inscription around this arch is an excerpt from John Ceredigion Jones' poem The Returning Man: "All's well for over there among his peers a happy warrior sleeps".

The walls of the Memorial Chamber are divided into 17 niches designed by Ira Lake and Archer Fortescue Duguid. Each contain a marble slab under a gothic blind arch topped with a gablet and finial, and decorated with various badges and insignia, including those of, on the mouldings: Canada's 178 pre-1914 militia regiments; in the pierced quatrefoil panels: cavalry, and non-infantry field units; in the diaper background: pre-Confederation French and British regiments and colonial forces; on the gablet crockets: reinforced battalions; on the gablet springers: all branches of the Canadian Corps; on the arch quatrefoil and cusps: Badges and insignia of Canada's 178 pre-1914 militia regiments: The Royal Canadian Dragoons, Lord Strathcona's Horse (Royal Canadians), The Governor General's Body Guard, 1st Hussars, 2nd Dragoons, 3rd The Prince of Wales' Canadian Dragoons; on the arch spandrels: medals and war decorations of the allied countries; on the shield: coats of arms appropriate to the relevant historical context; and on the low relief panel: historical scenes of Canadians during World War I. The marble panels themselves originally described the various campaigns and battles in the theatres of war between 1914 and 1918. These, however, were replaced in 1982 with panels illustrating the Canadian Forces' engagements from the Fenian Raids to the Korean War, along with excerpts from the Bible, poems, and other literature.

==== Windows ====
After John Pearson canvassed British artists in stained glass for designs for the Memorial Chamber's windows, he settled on Frank S.J. Hollister of Toronto for the task; Hollister's proposal was presented in 1925 to the Department of Public Works for the Governor-in-Council's approval. Each of the three 7 m by 3.5 m windows is divided into vertical quadrants by stone mullions and contain allegorical figures amongst heraldic symbols, including the Royal Arms of Canada, the arms of each of the provinces, and those of the United Kingdom.

The Call to Arms

This window displays four allegories: Victory, as a woman holding a crown and surrounded by a laurel branch and a helmet on a shield; Labour, a male figure amongst objects such as a shovel, spinning wheel, and astrolabe, with the motto Fortitudo Industria et Pax (Strength Industry and Peace); Progress, a man holding a book and quill, surrounded by a celestial crown, weighing scales, hourglass, and galley; and Science, a male holding a microscope and flask, amongst symbols such as a globe and torch, all below a ribbon indicating metallurgy, mineralogy, and chemistry. These four figures are arranged above four lower panels, the first showing three inscriptions: "Thanks be to God who give thus the victory", from 1 Corinthians 15:57, "Faith unto death", and "Acquit ye like men be strong", both from 1 Corinthians 16:13. Also in this section is a crowd of people bearing shields and spears, who represent the people of Canada uniting in response to the call of the man shown in the second panel, who holds a sword and trumpet, calling "To arms"; at his side is a child holding flowers, representing faith and courage. This section also displays the words "Thou hast girded me with strength unto the battle", from Psalm 18:39. In the third panel stands a woman supporting a rod entwined with winged serpents, the Rod of Asclepius, characterising the nurses of battle, and below her is the phrase "True worth that never knows ignoble defeat shines with undimmed glory", taken from Horace's Odes. The fourth bay displays a group of men and horses congregating from farms, offices, and factories, while a fleet of ships rests at bay awaiting the men to carry them to war.

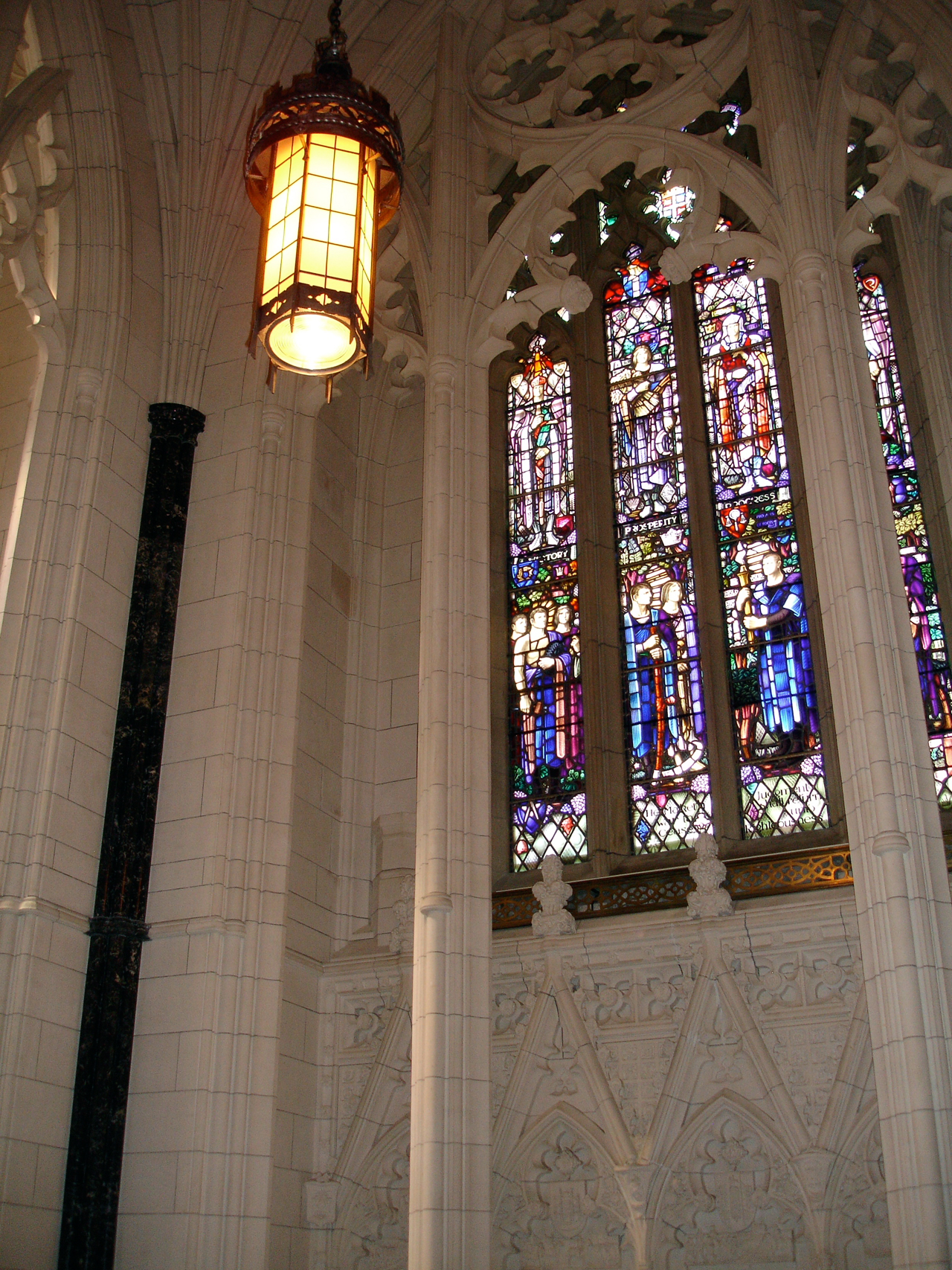
Looking up the south face of the Peace Tower, showing one of the Memorial Chamber's windows, The Dawn of Peace

The Assembly of Remembrance

This is the south window, the first panel of which shows the archangel Michael holding a trumpet, representing the call to battle, and, above his head, a seated woman with children at her knee, symbolising the sacrifices of women and children in the name of liberty, honour, and justice, while in the lower portion an armoured figure bears the Crown of Victory in his hands. The second panel contains the inscriptions: "At the going down of the sun and in the morning we will remember them", taken from the work of Laurence Binyon, and "Freedom is the sure possession of those alone who have courage to defend it", from Pericles, as well as, in the lower portion, an armoured figure holding a flambeau, and, in the upper part, St. George slaying the dragon. The third panel contains Lady Justice bearing the Scales of Justice and the Great Sword of Judgement, the sword-guard of which shows a figure in a crucifixion pose—representing suffering for both the victors and the defeated—and below her the words "Justitia libertas perpetuo" (Justice liberty in perpetuity). Beneath Lady Justice in this panel is the heroic figure of Canada wearing armour and helmet and holding the laurel wreath of victory, but looking mournfully at the Book of Remembrance, and behind her are two other persons, one symbolising Canadian motherhood and the other First Nations. The fourth quadrant shows Joan of Arc bearing a shield and standing before the royal coat of arms of France.

The Dawn of Peace

Similar to the other windows, this one shows four figures across the top portion. The first of these is the figure of the Victory of Peace, holding both a palm branch and the sword of judgement, while a dove flies overhead. The second person shown is that of Prosperity, who holds a wheat sheaf and a sicle, and, next to him, is Progress, bearing a winged wheel and with the Lamp of Knowledge above his head. The fourth figure is Plenty, symbolising the replenishment of both material and spirit through noble pursuit. Arranged in the lower portion of the window is a crowd of people assembled in peace and led by three figures in the foreground and bearing the symbols of their trades: Industry holds a mallet and dynamo, Agriculture bears a scythe, Honour carries a torch inscribed with words from John McCrae's poem In Flanders Fields: "Be the torch yours to hold it high", and Motherhood, who is surrounded by children. At the base of the second and third panels are the phrases: "He maketh wars to cease", from Psalm 46:9, and "Judgement shall return unto righteousness", from Psalm 94:15.

=== Carillon ===
Percival Price performs the national and royal anthems "O Canada" and "God Save the King" on the Peace Tower Carillon on its opening day, Canada Day 1927.

Accompanying the Peace Tower clock is a 53-bell carillon, conceived by an act of parliament as a commemoration of the 1918 armistice that ended World War I and was inaugurated on 1 July 1927, the 60th anniversary of Confederation. The bourdon ('largest') bell weighs 10,090 kg (22,240 lb) and the smallest weighs 4.5 kg (9.9 lb). They encompass a range of 4.5 octaves on the keyboard. All 53 bells were cast and tuned by Gillett & Johnston, a bell foundry based in Croydon, England. The Dominion Carillonneur plays both regular recitals on the carillon and tolls the bells to mark major occasions such as state funerals and Remembrance Day. Each bell is stationary and is struck by its internal clapper, itself mechanically linked to the carillon keyboard, to create a note, a particular one on the music scale for each bell. In this way, the carillon plays similarly to a piano, allowing the carillonneur to change the sounds by varying the way he or she strikes the keys.

The carillon has been silent since its last recital on 17 February 2022 as it undergoes restoration. The final recital was to be held on 18 February 2022, but it was cancelled due to arrests being made in conjunction with the Canada convoy protest.

== History ==
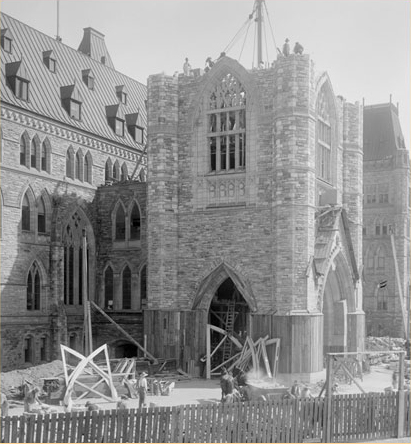
The tower under construction in 1921

Coming immediately after the destruction of the parliament buildings by fire in 1916, the Peace Tower's conception coincided with the end of the First World War. With this in mind, Prime Minister Robert Borden dedicated the site of the tower on 1 July 1917, with the words: "[the tower will be a] memorial to the debt of our forefathers and to the valour of those Canadians who, in the Great War, fought for the liberties of Canada, of the Empire, and of humanity." Two years later, the Peace Tower's cornerstone was laid by Prince Edward, Prince of Wales (later King Edward VIII), during his wider royal tour of Canada on 1 September 1919, and the structure was topped out in 1922. He referred to it as the Tower of Victory and Peace (French: tour de Victoire et de Paix).

In the summer of 1925, an informal ceremony was held in the Memorial Chamber, where in Governor General of Canada the Viscount Byng of Vimy; Prime Minister William Lyon Mackenzie King; Leader of His Majesty's Loyal Opposition Arthur Meighen; and the Commander-in-Chief of the British forces during World War I, the Earl Haig, laid the base stones of the clustered marble columns that support the fan vault ceiling. The Prince of Wales then returned to Ottawa again in 1927 to dedicate the altar of the Memorial Chamber and to inaugurate the Dominion Carillon, the first playing of which on that day was heard by listeners across the country on the first ever coast-to-coast radio broadcast in Canada. Upon completion, the Peace Tower stood as the tallest building in Ottawa as well as the whole of Canada.

Starting in 1994, the Peace Tower was covered and the accessible spaces closed for a two-year conservation project aimed at reversing deterioration of the masonry and preventing further moisture penetration. However, the machinery of the clock was not within the scope of work and, on 24 May 2006, the clock stopped for the first time in 28 years, with the display inactive at 7:28 for about one day.

== See also ==
- Architecture of Ottawa
- List of carillons
