= James Houston Spence =

Canadian politician

The Honourable James Houston Spence
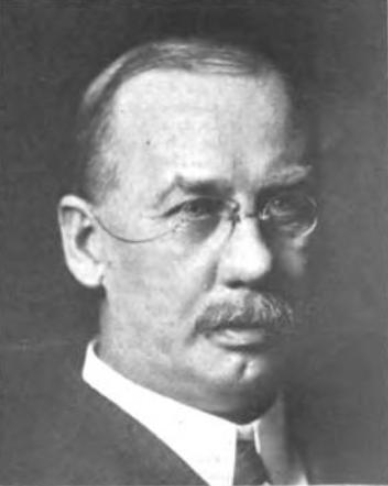

Canadian Senator from Ontario
- In office 1928–1939
- Appointed by: William Lyon Mackenzie King

Personal details
- Born: September 3, 1867 Greenock Township, Ontario, Canada
- Died: February 21, 1939 (aged 71) Toronto, Ontario, Canada
- Party: Liberal

James Houston Spence, KC, (September 3, 1867 – February 21, 1939) was a Canadian lawyer and Senator.

== Background ==
Spence was born in Greenock Township, Ontario and attended school in London, Ontario and Walkerton, Ontario. He graduated from Osgoode Hall Law School before being called to the bar. He was elected a Bencher of the Law Society of Upper Canada in 1917, named King's Counsel in 1922 and was the senior partner in the law firm of Spence, Shoemaker and Spence.

He specialized in corporate, commercial and municipal law.

He was active in the Liberal Party of Canada, campaigned on behalf of various Liberal candidates in provincial and federal elections, and was a close friend of Sir Wilfrid Laurier as well as a friend of William Lyon Mackenzie King who appointed him to the Senate in 1928.

Spence served in the Hamilton Regiment from 1890 to 1893. He was also a member of the Masonic Order.

He died at his home in Toronto on February 21, 1939.
