= Victoria Hospital for Sick Children =

Coordinates: 43.660308°N 79.386912°W

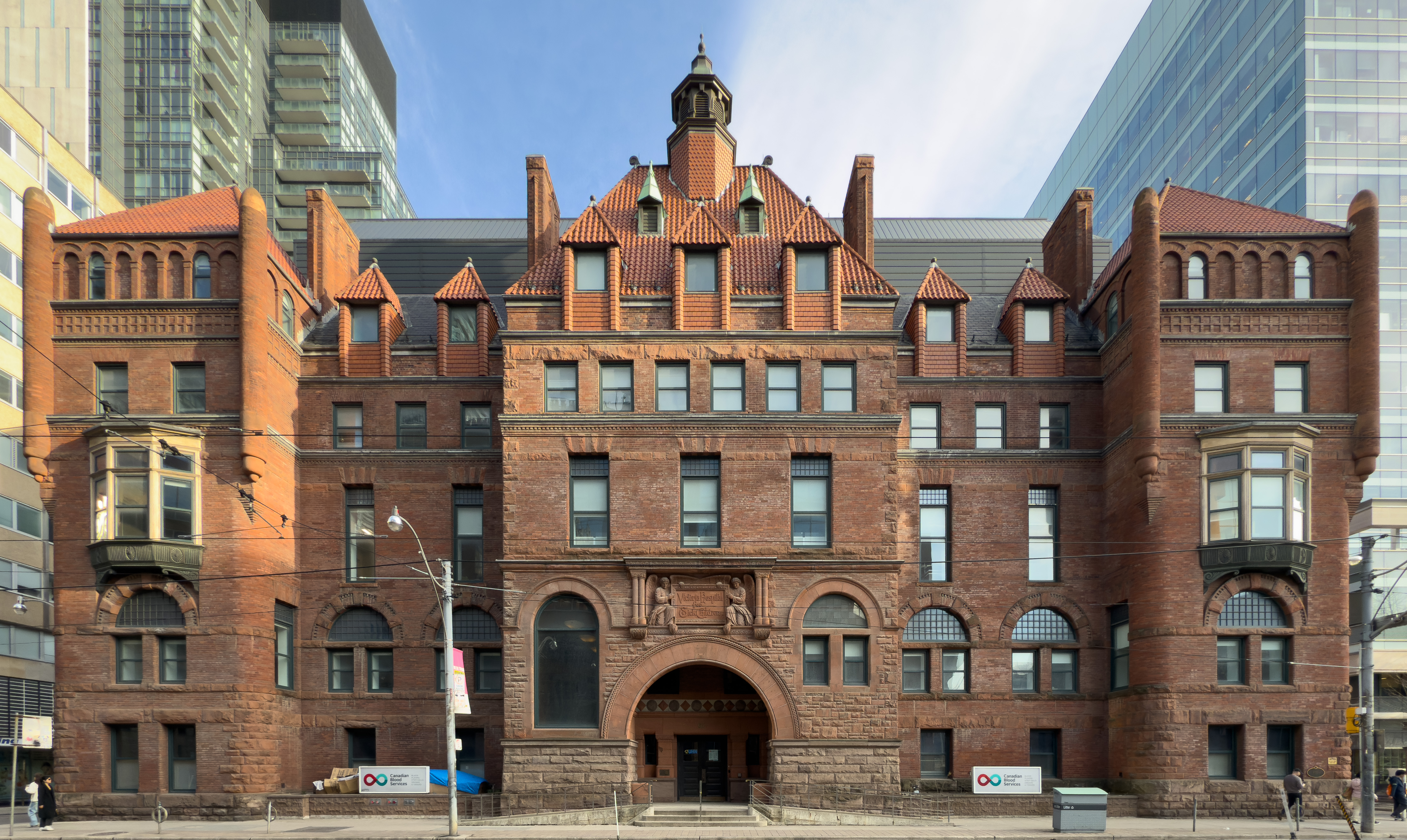
- Canadian Blood Services headquarters in 2025
- Interactive map of the Victoria Hospital for Sick Children area

General information
- Type: Institutional
- Architectural style: Romanesque Revival
- Location: 67 College Street, Toronto, Ontario, Canada
- Completed: 1890
- Renovated: 1993
- Owner: Canadian Blood Services

Technical details
- Floor count: Four storeys

Design and construction
- Architects: Darling and Curry; Parkin Architects (renovation)

Ontario Heritage Act
- Official name: Victoria Hospital for Sick Children
- Designated: November 26, 1975

Victoria Hospital for Sick Children is a building in Toronto, Ontario, Canada. The building housed The Hospital for Sick Children until 1951. It currently serves as the Toronto regional headquarters of Canadian Blood Services. The building has received a Commendation of Adaptive Re-use from the Toronto Historical Board. It is a heritage-designated building. It is located at the corner of College and Elizabeth Streets, near the Toronto General Hospital.

== History ==
The hospital was completed in 1890 by the architectural firm of Darling and Curry. Opening in 1892, it served as the hospital that is now called Hospital for Sick Children (or "Sick Kids") until 1951. The construction of the five-storey building was a very important step in the history of the hospital, since it had been previously located in a small downtown house with only six cots. The house had been rented for sixteen years by Elizabeth McMaster, the founder of the hospital, with support from a group of Toronto women. The new building had modern conveniences such as electric lighting, telephones and elevators, and was one of the first to be constructed specifically for the treatment of children. The invention of pablum, the introduction of incorporated X-rays in 1896, and the origins of the battle for compulsory milk pasteurization in 1908 occurred in this building.

In 1993, it was renovated at a cost of CA$23 million to become the home to the Canadian Red Cross Regional Blood Centre. The agency is now called Canadian Blood Services.

== Architecture ==
The building, which is made of sandstone, is rendered in the Richardsonian Romanesque style, then a trend in the design of buildings. Thick masonry walls are used as structure, with heavily rusticated stone used at the base. There is a cavernous door opening and windows are set deeply in reveals. The roof is steeply pitched, proving ventilation to the building.

== Awards ==
The building was awarded with Commendation of Adaptive Reuse by the Toronto Historical Board after it was reconstructed in 1993 by Parkin Architects.

== See also ==
- List of oldest buildings and structures in Toronto
