= John A. Pearson =

British-born Canadian architect

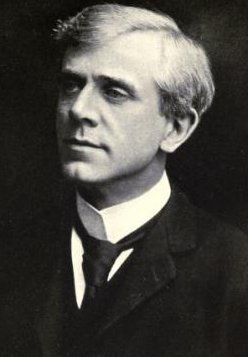
- Born: June 22, 1867; Chesterfield, Derbyshire, England
- Died: June 11, 1940 (aged 72); Toronto, Ontario, Canada
- Occupation: Architect
- Practice: Darling and Pearson

John Andrew Pearson (June 22, 1867 – June 11, 1940) was an early 20th-century British-born Canadian architect and partner to the Toronto-based firm of Darling and Pearson.

== Early life and education ==
Pearson was born in Chesterfield, UK. His father John Pearson (1831-1906) was a builder, stonemason and a carpenter in Sheffield. After attending Wesley College, Pearson worked as a stonemason for his father from 1885 to 1887 before emigrating to Canada in 1888.

== Career ==
Pearson worked for Henry Sproatt beginning in 1890, and joined Darling, Curry, Sproatt, & Pearson in 1892, with fellow partners Frank Darling and S. George Curry. Curry departed, and from 1893 through 1896 that office was known as Darling, Sproatt & Pearson.

In 1896 Sproatt left the partnership, and the firm was renamed Darling and Pearson. This partnership lasted from 1897 through Pearson's death in 1940.

Pearson was the first Vice-President of Ontario Association of Architects (1902).

Pearson's most significant project apart from this partnership is undoubtedly the Centre Block on Parliament Hill in Ottawa, a complex that contains the House of Commons of Canada and Senate of Canada, and the adjoining Peace Tower.

The previous Centre Block burned in 1916, entirely destroyed except for the Library of Parliament. By 1920 the Centre Block was rebuilt with a design by Pearson and collaborator Jean Omer Marchand of Montreal. The Peace Tower commemorating the end of the First World War was completed in 1927.

In 1928 Pearson was commissioned to design a building, with noted New York architects York and Sawyer, to house the head office of the Canadian Bank of Commerce in Toronto. The 34-story building was completed in 1931 in spite of the onset of the Great Depression, and at the time was the tallest building in the British Empire.

== Death ==
Pearson died in Toronto in 1940, aged 72. He is buried at Mount Pleasant Cemetery.

== Works ==
Building	Year Completed	Architect	Style	Source	Location	Image
University of Toronto Faculty of Law Flavelle House	1901	Darling and Pearson	Edwardian Classicism		University of Toronto St. George campus, Toronto, Ontario	
Convocation Hall	1906	Darling and Pearson	Edwardian Baroque		University of Toronto St. George campus, Toronto, Ontario	
University of Toronto Sanford Fleming Building	1907	Darling and Pearson	Edwardian Baroque		10 King's College Circle, Toronto, Ontario	
University of Toronto Sigmund Samuel Building	1907	Darling and Pearson	Romanesque Revival architecture		10 King's College Circle, Toronto, Ontario	
University of Toronto Sigmund Samuel Building additions	1912	John A. Pearson & Frank Darling	Romanesque Revival architecture		7 King's College Circle, Toronto, Ontario	
Toronto General Hospital- College Wing	1913	Darling and Pearson	Edwardian Baroque		101 College Street, Toronto, Ontario	
Centre Block containing House of Commons of Canada, Senate of Canada, Peace Tower,	1920	John A. Pearson & Jean Omer Marchand	Gothic Revival		Parliament Hill, Ottawa, Ontario	

== See also ==
- Henry Sproatt - partnered with Pearson from 1890 to 1896
