= Physics and Astronomy Building (University of Western Ontario) =

Coordinates: 43°00′35″N 81°16′21″W

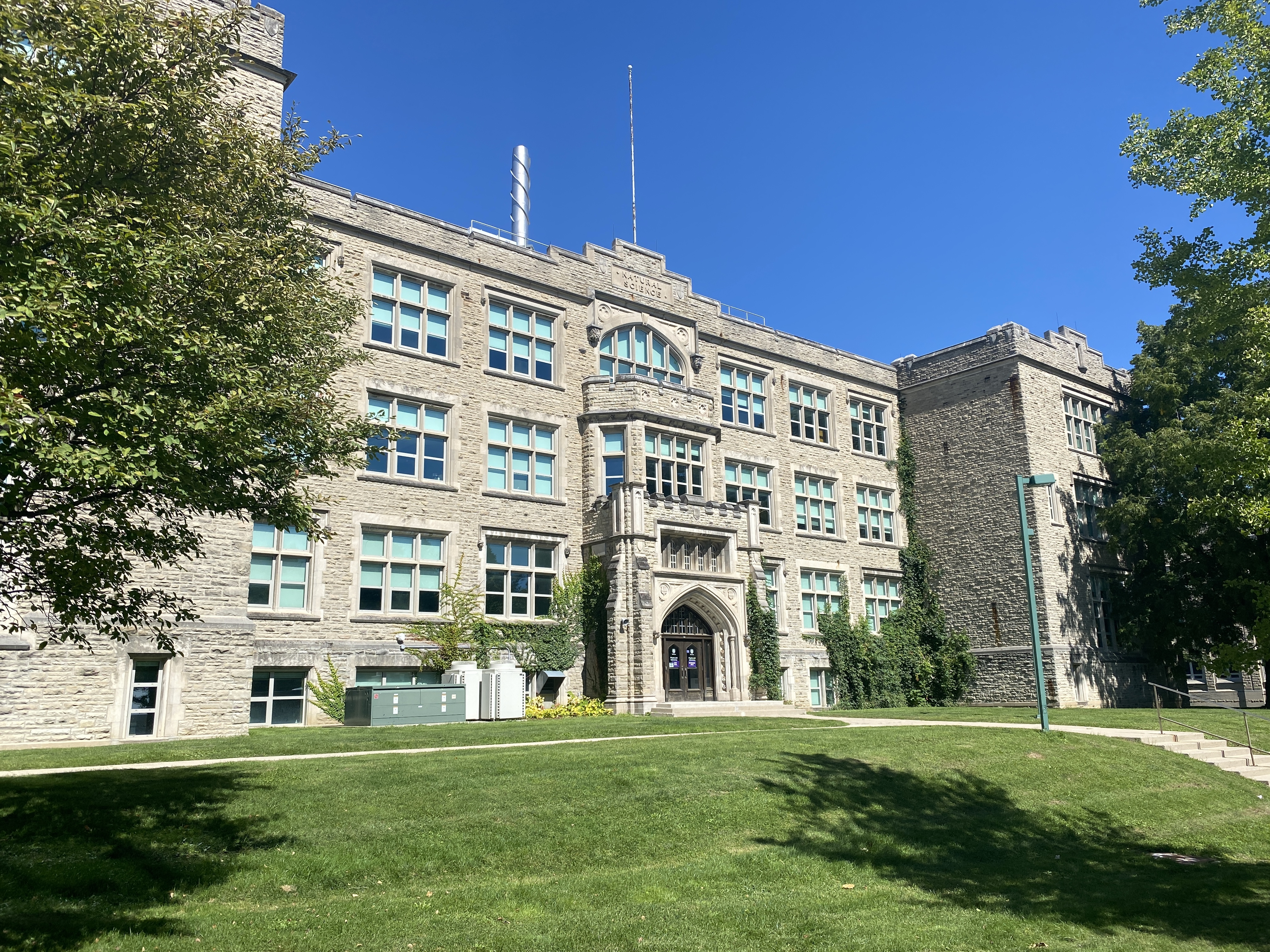
- Former names: Science Building

General information
- Type: Academic building
- Architectural style: Collegiate Gothic
- Location: London, Ontario, Canada
- Construction started: 1922
- Opened: October 16, 1924
- Renovated: 2013
- Renovation cost: CA$25,000,000
- Owner: University of Western Ontario

Design and construction
- Architects: John M. Moore & Company

Renovating team
- Awards and prizes: LEED Silver

The Physics and Astronomy Building, historically known as the Science Building, is an academic building of the University of Western Ontario on its main campus in London, Ontario. The building was the one of two erected on the present campus site in 1922, with the other building being University College. The design is a good example of collegiate Gothic architecture and its early use on the university campus and in the London area. In 2012, the building was renovated and awarded LEED Silver certification. It currently houses the Department of Physics and Astronomy.

== History ==
In 1915, the departments of Physics, Biology and Chemistry were established at the University of Western Ontario. Due to the increased number of students and lack of space, a proposal was granted in 1916 for the development of a new campus. In 1922, construction began on the present site of the new campus, overlooking the Thames River and away from the downtown core of the city. Two buildings (the Arts Building and the Science Building) were built during this first campus phase along with a bridge.

Both the Arts Building and the Science Building were constructed at the same time with the same architect, but with two different contractors. It was noted that due to this, the quality of work in the Science Building was noticeably better than the Arts Building. This can be observed in the masonry of the facade. Both buildings had the same cornerstone laying ceremony as well as opening date. The official opening was on October 16, 1924.

=== Renovation ===
The building went through a CA$25,000,000 renovation in 2012 to update all learning spaces, offices and laboratories. In addition to the building renovation, the original design was modified to enclose the courtyard in the centre of the building with a roof. The facade of the building was largely left intact and original materials were used, when applicable.

== Architecture and features ==
=== Exterior ===
The building is a typical design for collegiate Gothic architecture and was designed by John M. Moore & Company. The exterior facade is clad in sandstone and uses limestone for features such as sills and trim.

==== Carvings ====
Notable features to the building are intricate details in the masonry, including mascarons and cartouches throughout the door and window areas. These are noticeable as carved faces, characters and natural items like leaves and berries. There are a total of 138 carvings around the building.

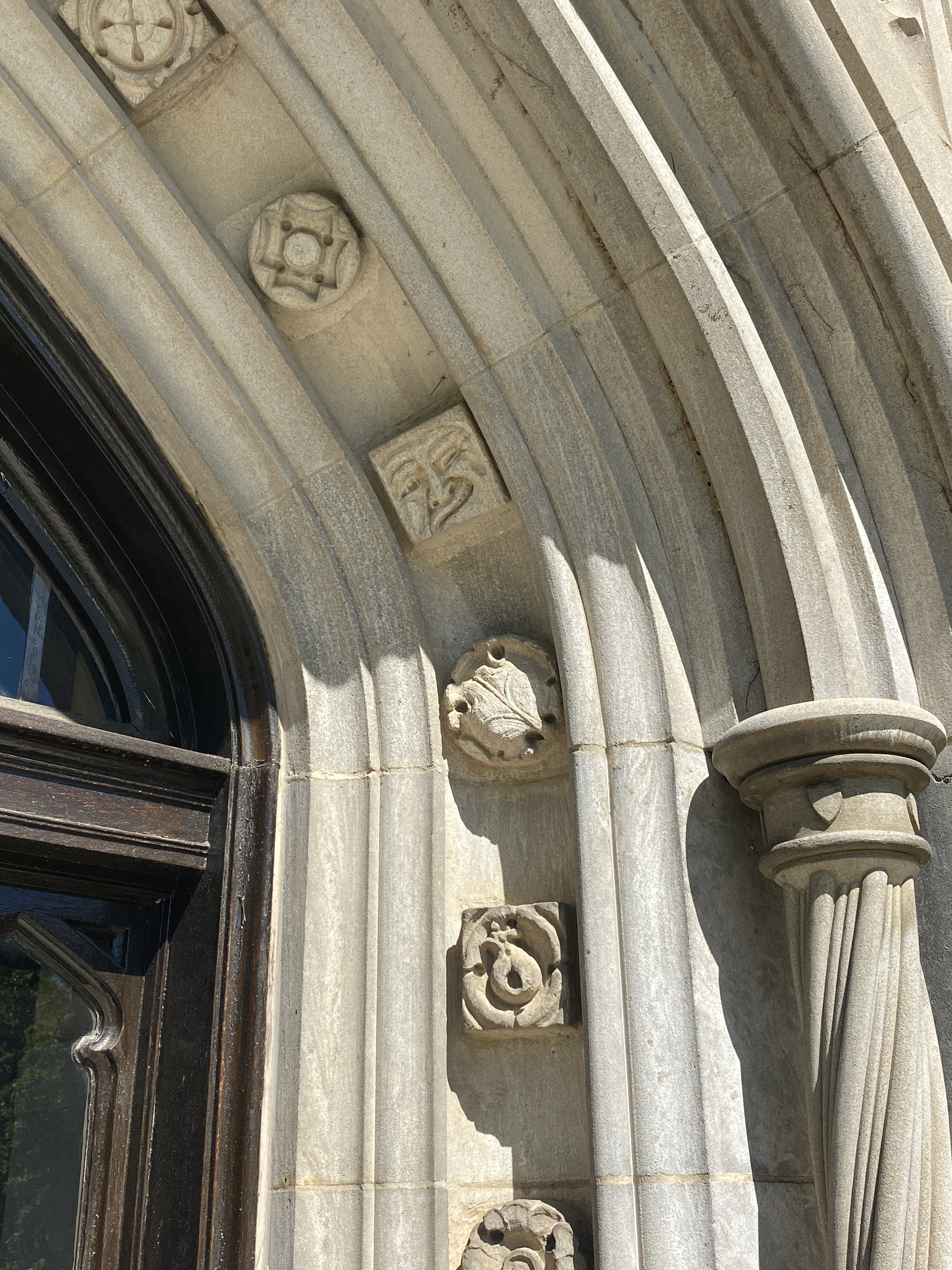
This doorway shows the detailed carvings around the entrance of different characters and plants.

=== Interior ===
The interior of the building features classrooms, laboratories, study spaces and offices.
