= Saugeen–Maitland Hall =

Saugeen-Maitland Hall
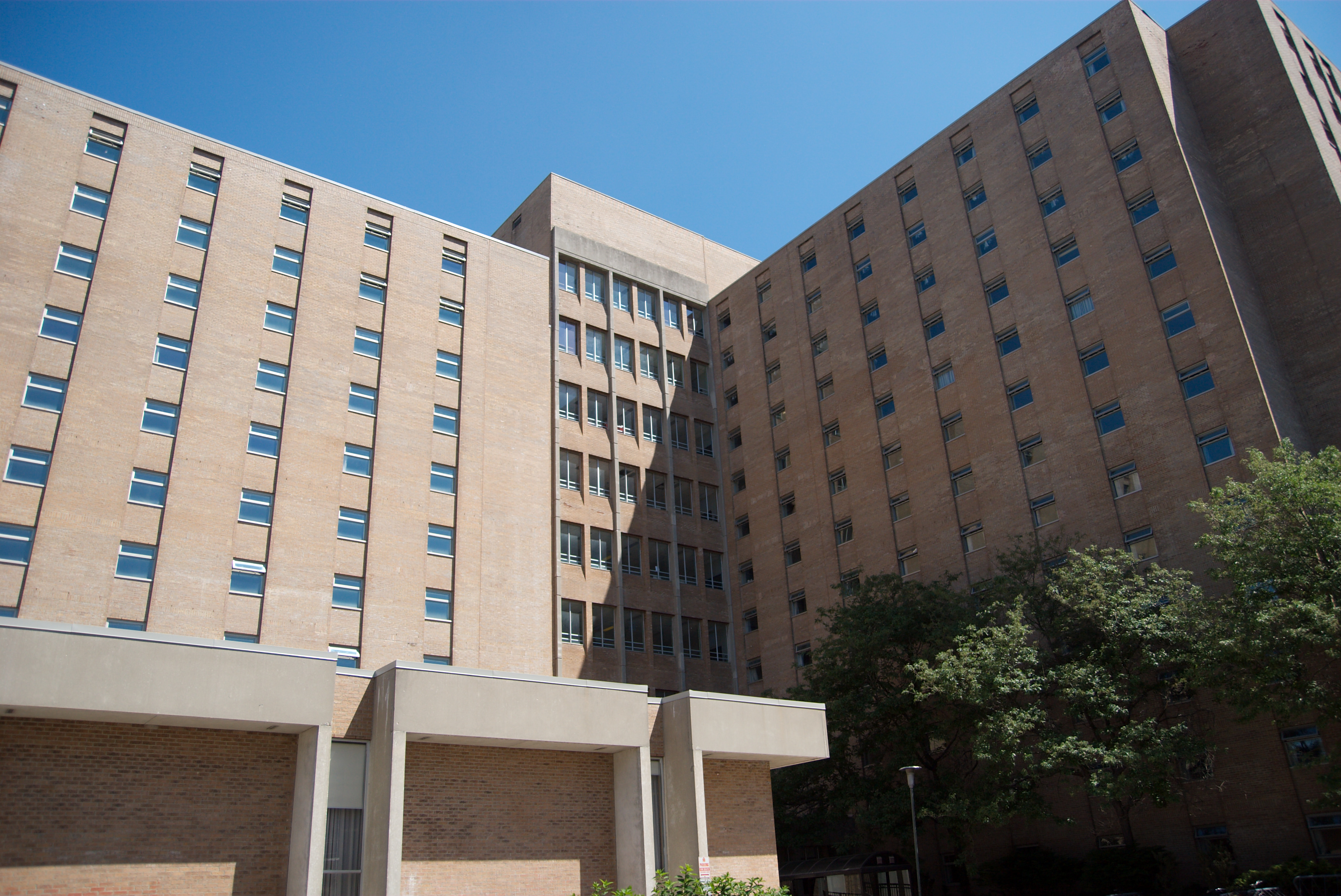
- Saugeen-Maitland Hall
- Interactive map of the Saugeen-Maitland Hall area
- Alternative names: Saugeen, The Zoo, Saug, SMH

General information
- Type: Student residence
- Location: The University of Western Ontario, London, Ontario, Canada, 289 Windermere Road
- Coordinates: 43°00′41.11″N 81°16′43.63″W
- Completed: 1969
- Renovated: 2015
- Renovation cost: CA$3.4 Million
- Owner: The University of Western Ontario

Technical details
- Floor count: 36

Renovating team
- Architects: McMichael Ruth, Ryan Stirling
- Renovating firm: architects Tillmann Ruth Robinson

Saugeen–Maitland Hall is a co-ed students' residence at the University of Western Ontario in London, Ontario, Canada. It is currently home to 1250 students and is the largest student residence on campus.

Saugeen–Maitland Hall is actually a combination of two residences which are built upon the same foundation and share the same entry floor. The building is divided at the upper elevator lobbies with Saugeen on the east side and Maitland on the west side. The residence has a cafeteria and snack bar, a large main floor lounge with a home theatre system and projection screen, an exercise room, four academic cafes, and music practice rooms. The residence is sub-divided into units, each consisting of three floors. Maitland has three units and Saugeen has nine. Most floors have 16 double rooms and four single rooms. The most recent renovation completed in 2016 included the dining hall at a cost of $3.4 Million.

== The name ==
Saugeen is an Ojibwa word meaning "inlet." It is in reference to the Saugeen River in Bruce County which flows into Lake Huron near the town of Southampton and was once an important shipping barge route. Maitland refers to the Maitland River, a river in Huron County which flows into Lake Huron near the town of Goderich. It is named for Sir Peregrine Maitland, a Lieutenant-Governor of Upper Canada.

The residence is most often known simply as "Saugeen", and until a few years ago, it was frequently called "The Zoo". While touring the residence while still under construction, Dr. T.B. Ong, the first residence proctor, commented that he "couldn't help thinking of the sectioned cages used for experimental animal specimens." Given the atmosphere of the early days, the name evolved naturally, and "The Zoo" first appeared in print as early as 1971, in the first yearbook.

== History ==
=== The beginning ===
Due to increased enrolment in the 1960s, UWO was facing a housing crunch. To alleviate this, a new housing complex for single and married students was planned on the west side of Western Road near Medway Creek. Estimated to cost $12 million, the complex included the nearby apartment buildings of Bayfield, Beaver and Ausable Halls. Together with Saugeen-Maitland, the complex was named the Glenmore Residences.

Delayed a year due to a construction strike, Saugeen–Maitland Hall opened in 1969 as the first co-ed residence on campus. For the first two years, the living quarters of the men and women were separate; the men were in the Saugeen portion of the building and the women were in the Maitland portion, with locked doors between the two sections. Yet this was the closest proximity that men and women were allowed to live in the history of Western.

The new residence wasn't a big hit with the first residents. The bare, white concrete walls and bolted-down furniture gave the residence an antiseptic, institutionalized feel. The staff were told to expect an average of three suicides a year, based on an American survey of suicides in high rise buildings. The "animal" image was established by the Saugeen residents in the first year: much vandalism occurred, including broken elevators and phones torn off the walls. By Christmas, many students had moved out in large numbers. Many women didn't want to live in Maitland, as there were rumours of stabbings, rapes and police raids. Several reasons were given for the problems: the large number (900 men, 300 women) of the residents, and the high ratio (80%) of first-year students.

=== Saugeen goes co-ed ===
In 1971, the university decided to merge the two separate residences into one, and allow men and women to live on alternating single-sex floors. The number of women was increased to 500, correspondingly decreasing the men to 700. More upper-year students were also brought in.

In 1975, the co-ed experiment continued further, with one unit of upper-year students given the opportunity to turn completely co-ed, with alternating rooms of men and women. Five years later in 1981, the trial was expanded to six units. This setup was declared a success in reducing damages and other incidents, as it "helped make the males more conscientious and mature," according to Marty Benson, Residence Council President. The co-ed trend continued until the male-female ratio was 50-50, and most floors in the building were mixed gender.

=== Fire: real and false ===
Early in the morning of January 12, 1984, a student was playing with toilet paper and matches in room 212 and accidentally started a fire. The contents of the room were incinerated and the rest of the floor was severely damaged. Six students were sent to hospital, including the man responsible, who had burns on his feet.

In January 1991 a large fire broke out in underground electrical wiring, between Saugeen and the other Glenmore residences. Twelve fire trucks responded, and 2,000 residents were evacuated. The fire knocked out power in many buildings on campus, including the residences, which also disabled the backup power and even the fire alarms. Nobody was hurt in the incident.

A rash of false alarms took place during the Christmas exam period in 1992. Five false alarms were pulled in one weekend caused students to wait out in the cold for more than two hours in the early morning, sending one resident to hospital with frostbite on her fingers and toes. The administration remedied this problem in 1994 by spending $850,000 on a new alarm system more resistant to malicious triggering.

=== Suppression of "The Zoo" ===
In an effort to fight the party animal image that had taken hold of Saugeen, and by extension Western, the administration began to crack down in 1989 on the use of the word "Zoo" being related in any way to the residence. The yearbook, newsletter, and tuck shop were all renamed to more "appropriate" names. In response, upper-year and former residents took it upon themselves to keep the Zoo name alive by distributing flyers with the message "Zoo... pass it on" and "Zoo" graffiti appeared on campus.

Another method of rebellion took the form of an unsanctioned group called the Zoo Crew. When printed, the name was usually spelled with the Greek letters ΖΘΘ (zeta theta theta), in an effort to avoid the ban on "Zoo", which also gave the group a fraternity-like appearance. The Zoo Crew was made up of former and current members of the residence, but was never officially associated with Saugeen. The group would organize pub crawls, and would sell a package including drink tickets, shot glasses and clothing with the words "Zoo Crew" on it. Even though a representative from the Zoo Crew argued Western's administration should not be upset about these pub crawls because they were not residents of Saugeen, this loosely run organization eventually dissolved as well.

During the 1998-1999 school year, the student council was asked to change the name of the Saugeen yearbook from The Jungle Book to something more appropriate, which did not refer even remotely to the Zoo. Western's administration feared the Zoo image would negatively impact enrolment and was the stated reason for the change. The students refused and released the yearbook with the same title. A heavy presence of photos deemed inappropriate resulted in the council being dissolved, many of the council members deemed responsible were denied re-admission to the residence the following year, and the residents' council was dissolved. The 1999 school year started without any residents' council to plan events or sit on the University Students' Council, and the number of Sophs were reduced to just 36 - one for each floor.

== Notable residents ==
- Duncan Coutts, musician for Our Lady Peace
- Scott Russell, CBC Commentator, Hockey Night in Canada
- Mike Turner, musician for Our Lady Peace
