= WindEEE Dome =

Vertical wind tunnel in Ontario, Canada

Coordinates: 42°57′19.77″N 81°7′30.37″W

WindEEE RI
- The Wind Engineering, Energy and Environment Research Institute

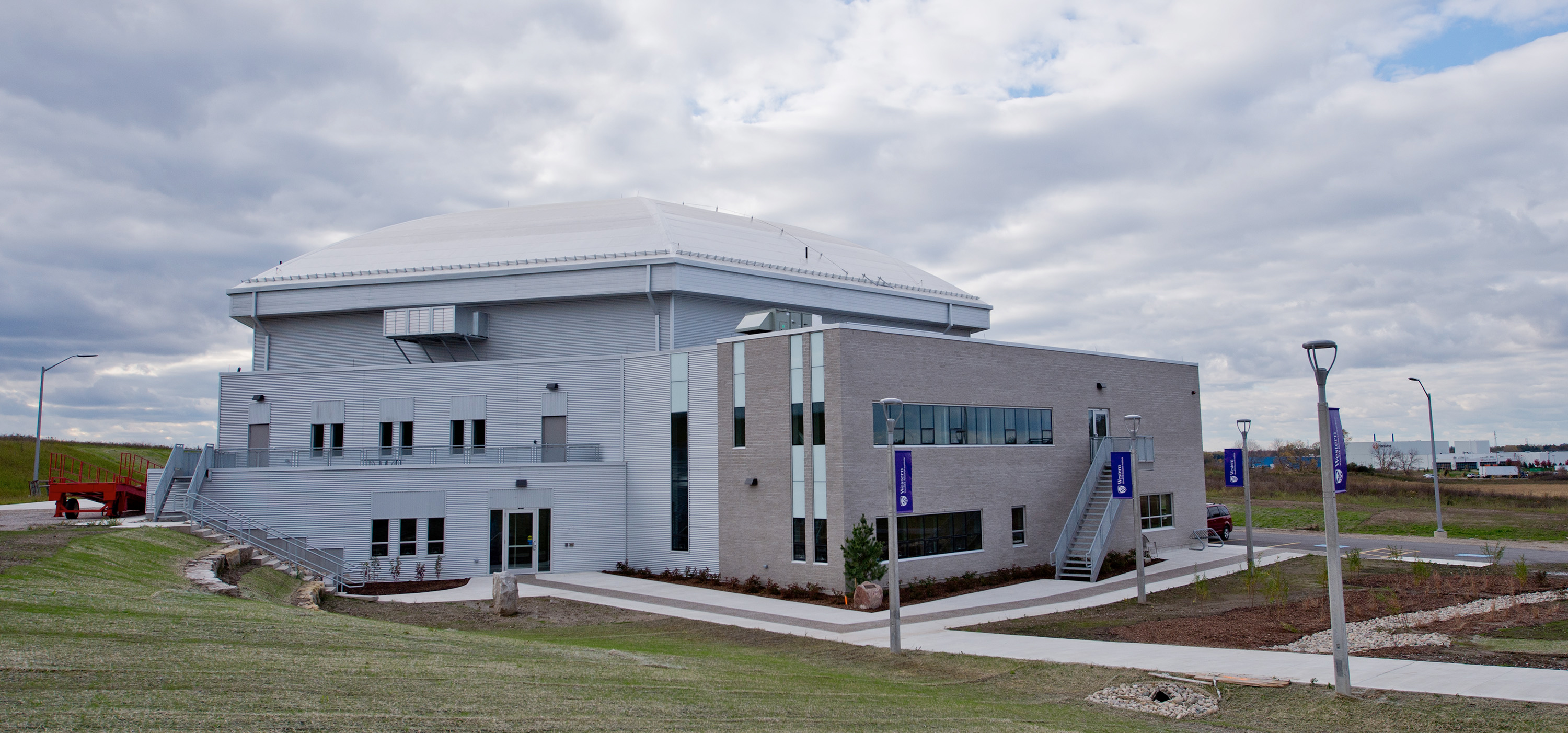
- The facilities
- Founder: Western Engineering
- Founded at: Canada
- Purpose: Wind research
- Headquarters: Western University
- Location: 2535 Advanced Avenue, London, Ontario N6M-0E2, Canada
- Fields: Wind Engineering, Energy and Environment
- Key people: Horia Hangan Professor and Director WindEEE Research Institute
- Website: www.eng.uwo.ca/windeee/index.html

The Wind Engineering, Energy and Environment (WindEEE) Dome is a hexagonal-shaped vertical wind tunnel proposed for the University of Western Ontario. It is designed to simulate localized, high-intensity wind patterns such as downbursts and tornadoes that have never been studied before.

The Wind Engineering, Energy and Environment Research Institute (WindEEE RI) was established in 2011.

WindEEE is part of the new Advanced Manufacturing Park (AMP) where, together with other facilities (e.g. the Fraunhofer Project Centre and Western Accelerator Centre) will contribute to create an industry oriented research incubator at Western working with local, national and international partners. The WindEEE Institute already has an extensive national membership with more than 40 researchers from 18 universities across Canada. Internationally WindEEE collaborates with more than 30 Institutes across four continents. In October 2013, WindEEE RI organized its first "Wind Innovation Symposium" to which more than 100 participants from around the globe participated.

== About ==
The areas of research at WindEEE target the three EEE's: wind Engineering, Energy and Environment. Main topics relate to: impact of non-synoptic wind systems (such as tornadoes and downbursts) on buildings and structures, optimization of wind farms and wind turbines, physical modelling of flow over rough surfaces, urban canopies, complex topography and forestry, outdoor and indoor air quality, and wind driven rain and snow. Also, ancillary research is conducted on risk analysis and models, power grid operations, policy, economics and decision making models.

The Institute acts as an enabler of industry-academic partnership in wind-related research in which commercial funding is matched with academic research funds in order to multiply the initial investment. Collaborations focus on, but are not limited to insurance, wind and solar energy, electric transmission/distribution, and construction materials industries. WindEEE collaborates closely with other wind engineering facilities at Western, including the Boundary Layer Wind Tunnel Laboratory (BLWTL), which together provide a large palette and long history of expertise in wind research and applications.

== Building Features ==
=== WindEEE Dome ===
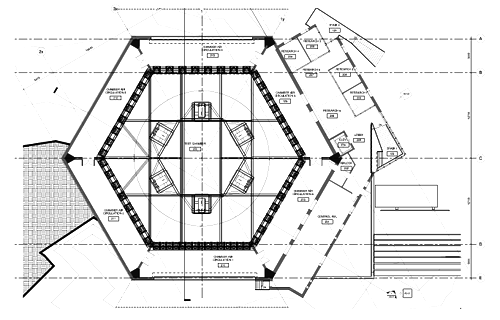
This is the facilities architectural cross-section of the top-view

The Wind Engineering, Energy and Environment (WindEEE) Dome is the world's first hexagonal wind tunnel. Its large scale structure (25 meters diameter for the inner dome and 40 meters diameter for the outer return dome) will allow for wind simulations over extended areas and complex terrain. In a nutshell WindEEE will, for the first time, allow for the manipulation of inflow and boundary conditions to reproduce, at large scales and under controlled conditions, the dynamics of real wind systems.

Mounted on the peripheral walls and at the top of the dome, an array of specialized fans will be activated using a sophisticated control strategy to provide time-varying and spatially-varying flow fields in the test section. By manipulating the outflow and direction of theses fans the facility will be capable of producing time-dependent, straight, sheared or swirl winds of variable directionality. Therefore, a large variety of wind fields such as boundary layers, portions of hurricanes, tornados, downbursts, low level currents or gust fronts will be physically simulated.

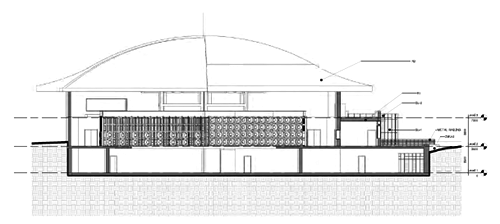
Side view of the facilities architectural cross-section

An active topographic capability will generate a wide diversity of surface topographies at unprecedented scales allowing wind simulations over areas of the order of 10 km2 . The same system will be used to locally seed for the Particle Image Velocimetry (PIV) system that will measure the wind field over extended areas. A traverse mechanism will allow for a LASER head to traverse the flow in a multitude of vertical and horizontal sections in order to produce PIV wind field measurements with a full scale equivalent resolution of 10 meters.

It is expected that for the first time laboratory tornado-like flows as large as 6 meter in diameter will simulate the equivalent of F3 Fujita Scale intensity winds. Large scale models of wind farms or portions of transmission lines will be tested under a wide range of wind conditions. The interference between wind turbines (wake and array effects) will be investigated and a full scale wind turbine blade can be traversed through the 25 m diameter dome and tested under realistic wind shear and wind turbulence conditions. The dispersion of pollutants, the effects of winds on forests and plant canopies will also be addressed.

The hexagonal wind tunnel has 106 fans to simulate a tornado. The force created is so weak that a person can simply stand inside but still feel the effects of the wind.

== In the Media ==
The facility appeared in Wild Weather with Richard Hammond where Richard Hammond tried to track the speed of a tornado near the ground.
