= Gibbons Lodge =

Official Residence in London, Ontario

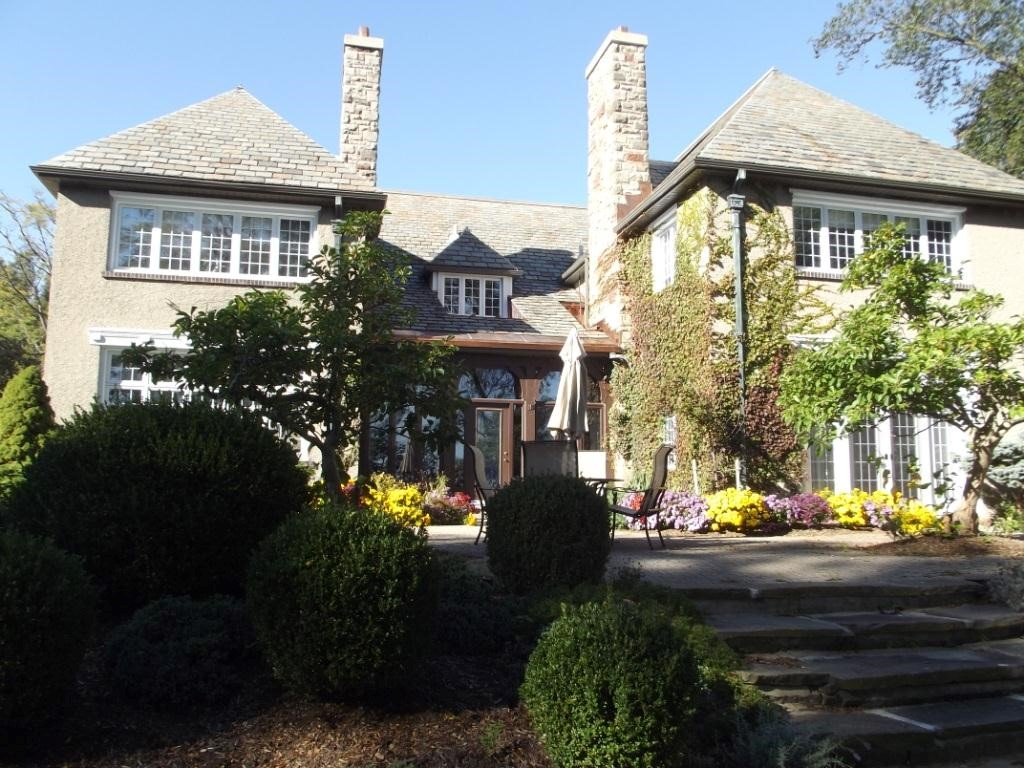
- Gibbons Lodge the university president's official residence

General information
- Type: Official Residence
- Architectural style: Tudor Revival architecture
- Location: 1836 Richmond Street; London, Ontario; N5X 4B9
- Coordinates: 43.0323231°N 81.2832222°W
- Completed: 1932

Design and construction
- Architect: Charles Oram

The Gibbons Lodge, also known as the President's House or the Helen Gibbons House, is a residence for the University of Western Ontario's president located in the neighbourhood of Uplands in London, Ontario, Canada. The residence is located on a 18-hectare (44.5-acre) property which borders Richmond Street and overlooks the University of Western Ontario. Helen Gibbons daughter of a prominent lawyer, Sir George C. Gibbons purchased the property in 1928. The house was built in 1932 by a local builder, Charles Oram. After Miss. Gibbons death (1960), the house was donated to The University of Western Ontario’s Board of Governors, and the surrounding land purchased in 1961 by the University for $150,000. The mansion has served as University of Western Ontario president's residence since the property was purchased in 1960.

== See also ==
- Presidents House
