= University of Western Ontario =

Public university in Ontario, Canada

The University of Western Ontario
- Coat of arms
- Other name: Western University
- Former names: The Western University of London, Ontario
- Motto: Veritas et utilitas (Latin)
- Motto in English: "Truth and usefulness"
- Type: Public research university
- Established: March 7, 1878 (148 years ago)
- Academic affiliations: ACU, CARL, COU, CUSID, Fields Institute, Universities Canada, U15
- Endowment: CA$1.3 billion (2024)
- Budget: CA$1.7 billion
- Visitor: Edith Dumont (ex officio as Lieutenant Governor of Ontario)
- Chancellor: Kelly Meighen
- President: Alan Shepard
- Provost: Florentine Strzelczyk
- Faculty: 1,432
- Students: 37,875
- Undergraduates: 30,647
- Postgraduates: 7,221
- Location: London, Ontario, Canada (Note: The university's main campus is located on 1151 Richmond Street in London, Ontario. However, in addition to its main campus the university also operates other facilities throughout southwestern Ontario.); 43°00′30″N 81°16′21″W
- Campus: Urban, 455 hectares (1,120 acres)
Colours
Western Purple and White
- Nickname: Mustangs
- Sporting affiliations: U Sports, OUA
- Mascot: JW the Mustang
- Website: uwo.ca

The University of Western Ontario (UWO; branded as Western University) is a public research university in London, Ontario, Canada. The main campus is located on 455 hectares (1,120 acres) of land, surrounded by residential neighbourhoods and the Thames River bisecting the campus's eastern portion. The university operates twelve academic faculties and schools.

The university was founded on March 7, 1878, by Bishop Isaac Hellmuth of the Anglican Diocese of Huron as The Western University of London, Ontario. It incorporated Huron College, which had been founded in 1863. The first four faculties were Arts, Divinity, Law and Medicine. The university became non-denominational in 1908. Beginning in 1919, the university affiliated with several denominational colleges. The university grew substantially in the post-World War II era, and a number of faculties and schools were added.

Western is a co-educational university, with more than 24,000 students, and over 306,000 living alumni worldwide. The university is a founding member of the U15, Canada's group of most distinguished research-intensive universities. Western's varsity teams, known as the Western Mustangs, compete in the Ontario University Athletics conference of U Sports.

== History ==
The university was founded on March, 7 1878 by Bishop Isaac Hellmuth of the Anglican Diocese of Huron as The Western University of London, Ontario, and its first chancellor was Chief Justice Richard Martin Meredith. It incorporated Huron College, which had been founded in 1863. The first four faculties were Arts, Divinity, Law and Medicine (London Medical College). There were originally only 15 students when classes began in 1881.

Although the university was incorporated in 1878, it was not until June 20, 1881 that it received the right to confer degrees in arts, divinity and medicine. In 1882, the name of the university was revised to The Western University and College of London, Ontario. The first convocation of graduates was held on April 27, 1883. Initially affiliated with the Church of England, the university became non-denominational in 1908.

In 1916, the university's current site was purchased from the Kingsmill family. There are two World War I memorial plaques in University College. The first lists the 19 students and graduates of the University of Western Ontario who died; the second honours the men from Middlesex County who died. A third plaque lists those who served with the No. 10 Canadian General hospital during WWII, the unit raised and equipped by UWO.

In 1923, the university was renamed as The University of Western Ontario. The first two buildings constructed by architect John Moore and Co. at the new site were the Arts Building (now University College) and the Natural Science Building (now the Physics and Astronomy Building). Classes on the university's present site began in 1924. The University College tower, one of the university's most distinctive features, was named the Middlesex Memorial Tower in honour of the men from Middlesex County who fought in World War I.

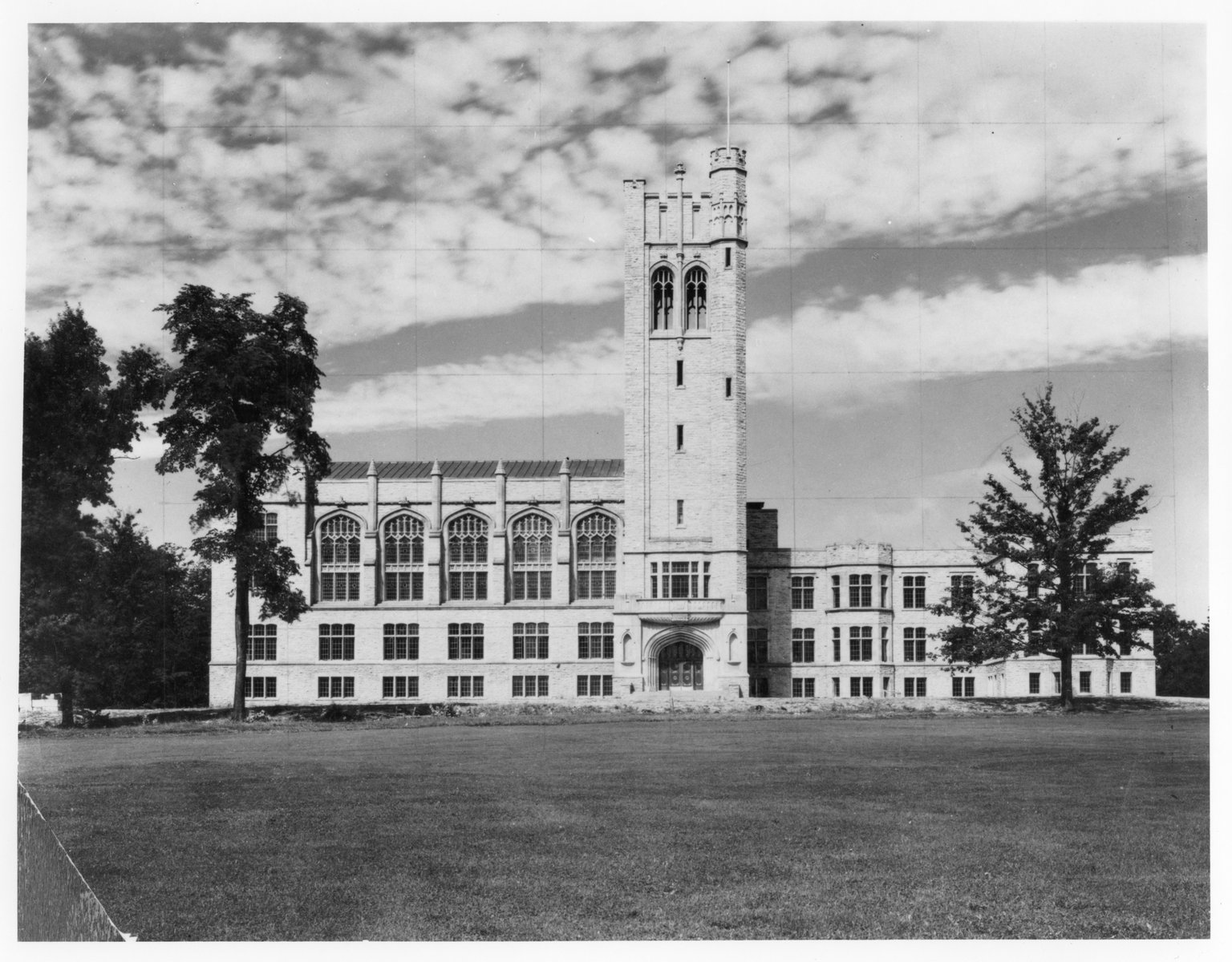
University College in June 1924

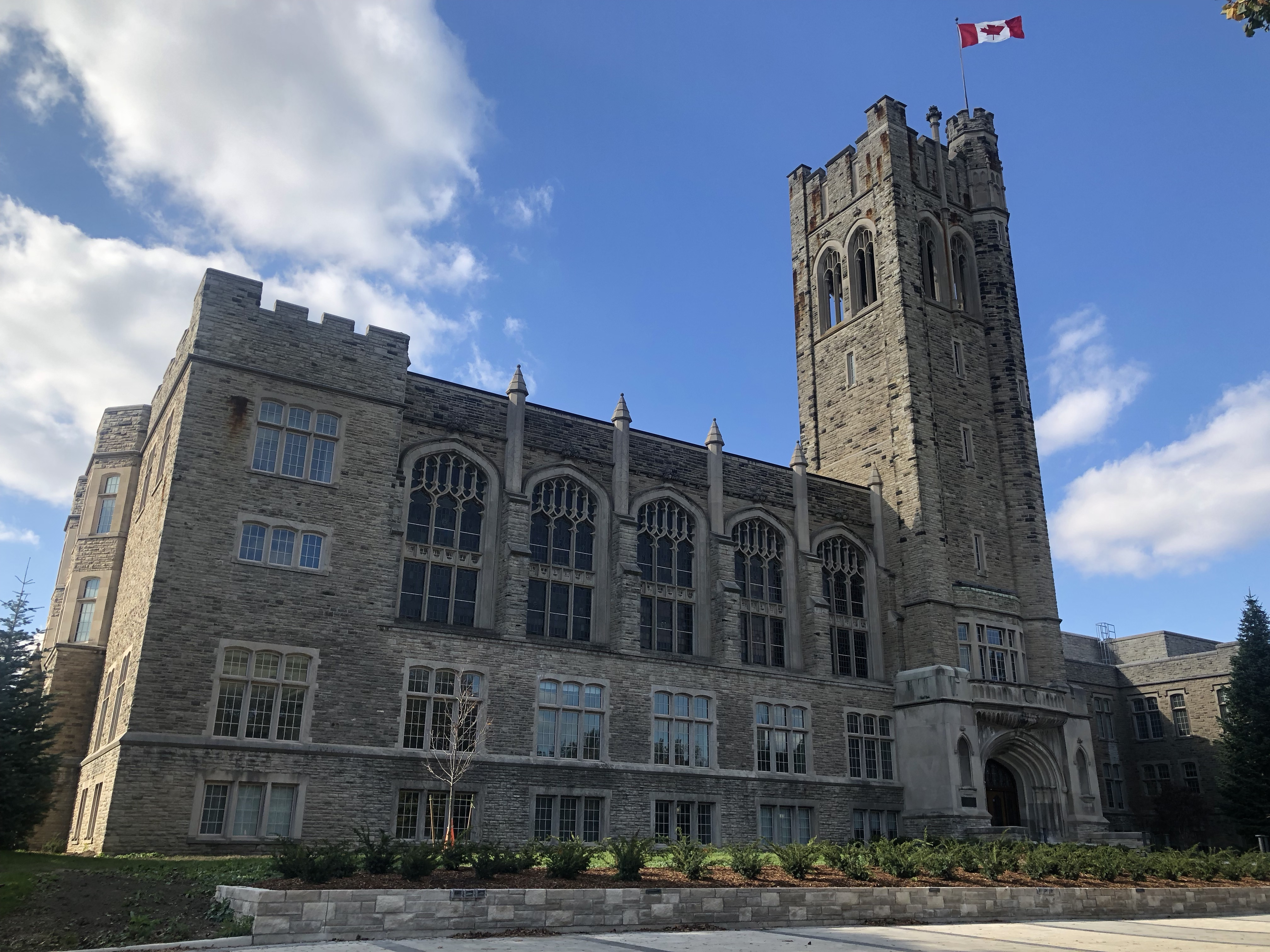
University College in October 2018

Completed in 1924, University College is one of the earliest university buildings built on the present campus.

In the early 20th century, a number of institutions became affiliated colleges of Western. In 1919, Brescia College was established as a Roman Catholic affiliate of Western, while Assumption College entered an affiliation agreement with the university. Other institutions that became affiliated colleges of Western includes the Waterloo College of Arts in 1925, St. Peter's College in 1939, and King's College in 1945. Waterloo College of Arts remained affiliated with Western until 1960, when the institution was reorganized into Wilfrid Laurier University; while Assumption College remained affiliated with Western until 1964, when it was reorganized into the University of Windsor. Brescia College ceased operations and was integrated into Western's main campus in 2024, while Huron and King's remain independent affiliates.

Two World War II memorial honour rolls are hung on the Physics and Astronomy Building: the first lists the UWO students and graduates who served in the Second World War, and the second lists those who served with the No. 10 Canadian General hospital during WWII, the unit raised and equipped by UWO.

Although enrolment was relatively small for many years, the university began to grow after World War II. It added a number of faculties in the post-war period, such as the Faculty of Graduate Studies in 1947, the School of Business Administration (now the Ivey Business School) in 1949, the Faculty of Engineering Science (now the Faculty of Engineering) in 1957, the Faculty of Law in 1959, Althouse College (now the Faculty of Education) in 1965, and the Faculty of Music in 1968.

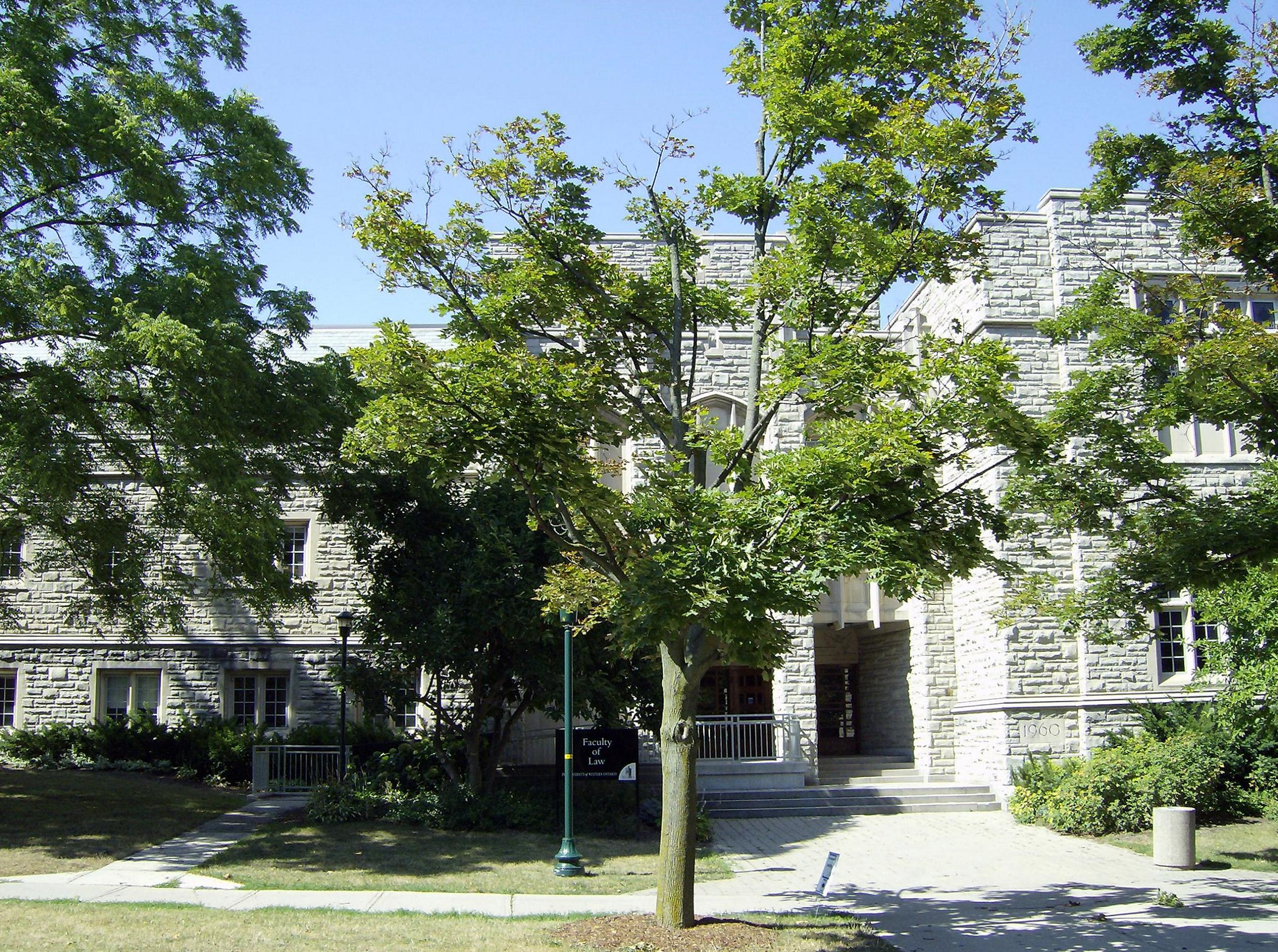
The Law Building houses the university's Faculty of Law. The building was completed in 1960, shortly after the faculty was established.

In 2012, the university rebranded itself as "Western University" to give the school less of a regional or even national identity. "We want to be international," president Dr. Amit Chakma told The Globe and Mail. The university's legal name, however, remains "The University of Western Ontario" and, as such, remains in use on transcripts and diplomas.

== Campus ==
The University of Western Ontario is in the city of London, Ontario, in the southwestern end of the Quebec City–Windsor Corridor. Most of the campus is surrounded by residential neighbourhoods, with the Thames River bisecting the campus' eastern portion. Western Road is the university's major transportation artery, travelling north to south. The central campus, which includes most of the university's student residences and teaching facilities is approximately 170.8 hectares (422 acres).

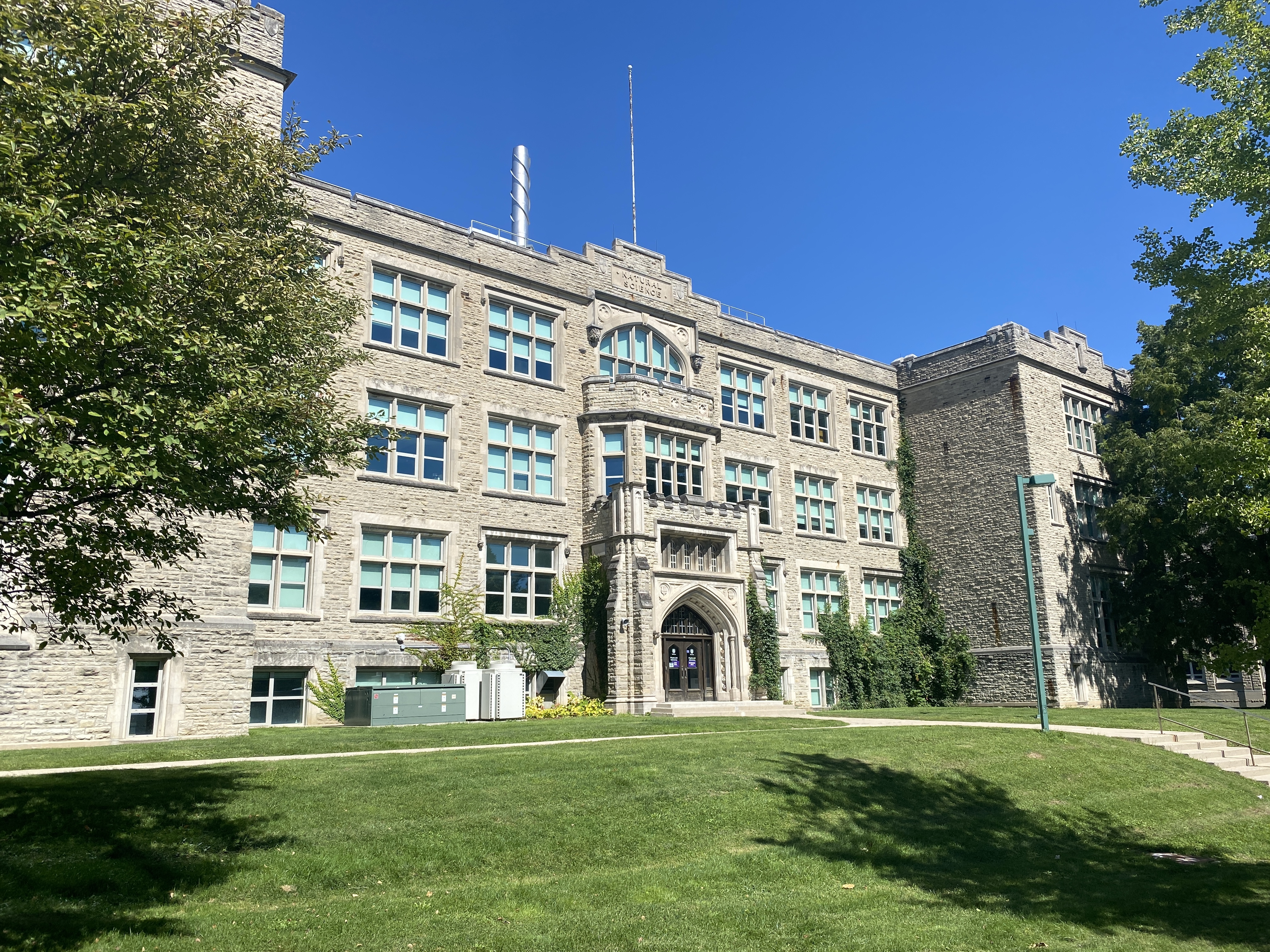
The Physics and Astronomy Building is one of several buildings on campus built in a Collegiate Gothic architectural style.

The development of Western's present campus began in the 1920s. Many of the university's earliest buildings used Collegiate Gothic designs. As the campus expanded in the late 1960s, the university abandoned Gothic designs in favour of brutalist and modernist architecture. In 2000, planning for Western's central campus was re-conceptualized, with the core devoted for only academic buildings. The plan saw University College Hill as the focal point, linking the lower portion of the campus with the South Valley. The 2006 campus master plan called for the protection and renewed emphasis on Western's Collegiate Gothic buildings. The oldest academic buildings within the central campus is University College and the Physics and Astronomy Building, both completed in 1924. The Ronald D. Schmeichel Building for Entrepreneurship and Innovation opened in September 2024 and is the newest academic building on campus. The Western Interdisciplinary Research Building, or WIRB, houses state-of-the art research facilities for the study of cognitive neuroscience as well as the Brain and Mind Institute, BrainsCAN, and the Rotman Institute for Philosophy.

=== Library and museums ===
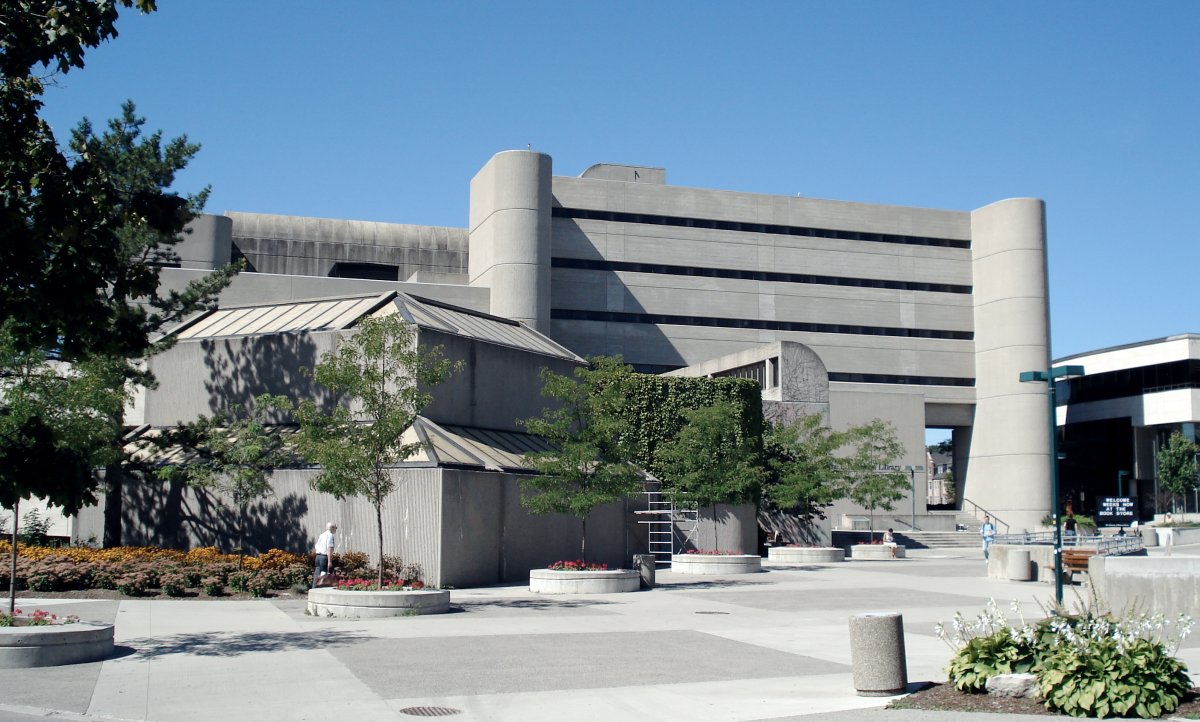
The D. B. Weldon Library is one of the six branches of the Western Libraries.

The university's library system, Western Libraries, operates six libraries that house more than 6.11 million books as of September 2025, as well as electronic resources including e-books, serial titles, and databases. Libraries a part of the system include the Allyn and Betty Taylor Library, C. B. Johnston Library, the D. B. Weldon Library, the Education Library, the John & Dotsa Bitove Family Law Library, and the Music Library. Allyn and Betty Taylor Library primarily services the faculties of Engineering, Health Sciences, Science, and the Schulich School of Medicine & Dentistry, while the C. B. Johnston Library primarily serves the Ivey Business School. The D. B. Weldon Library primarily services the faculties of Arts & Humanities, Information & Media Studies, and Social Sciences. The D. B. Weldon Library also houses the university's Archives and Research Collections Centre. Western Libraries also maintains the Shared Library Catalogue, which provides common access to the collections of Western Libraries, as well as the collections from the libraries of university colleges affiliated with the Western, including Huron University College, King's University College, and St. Peter's Seminary. Access to the Shared University Catalogue is provided to students and faculty of Western, and the affiliated university colleges.

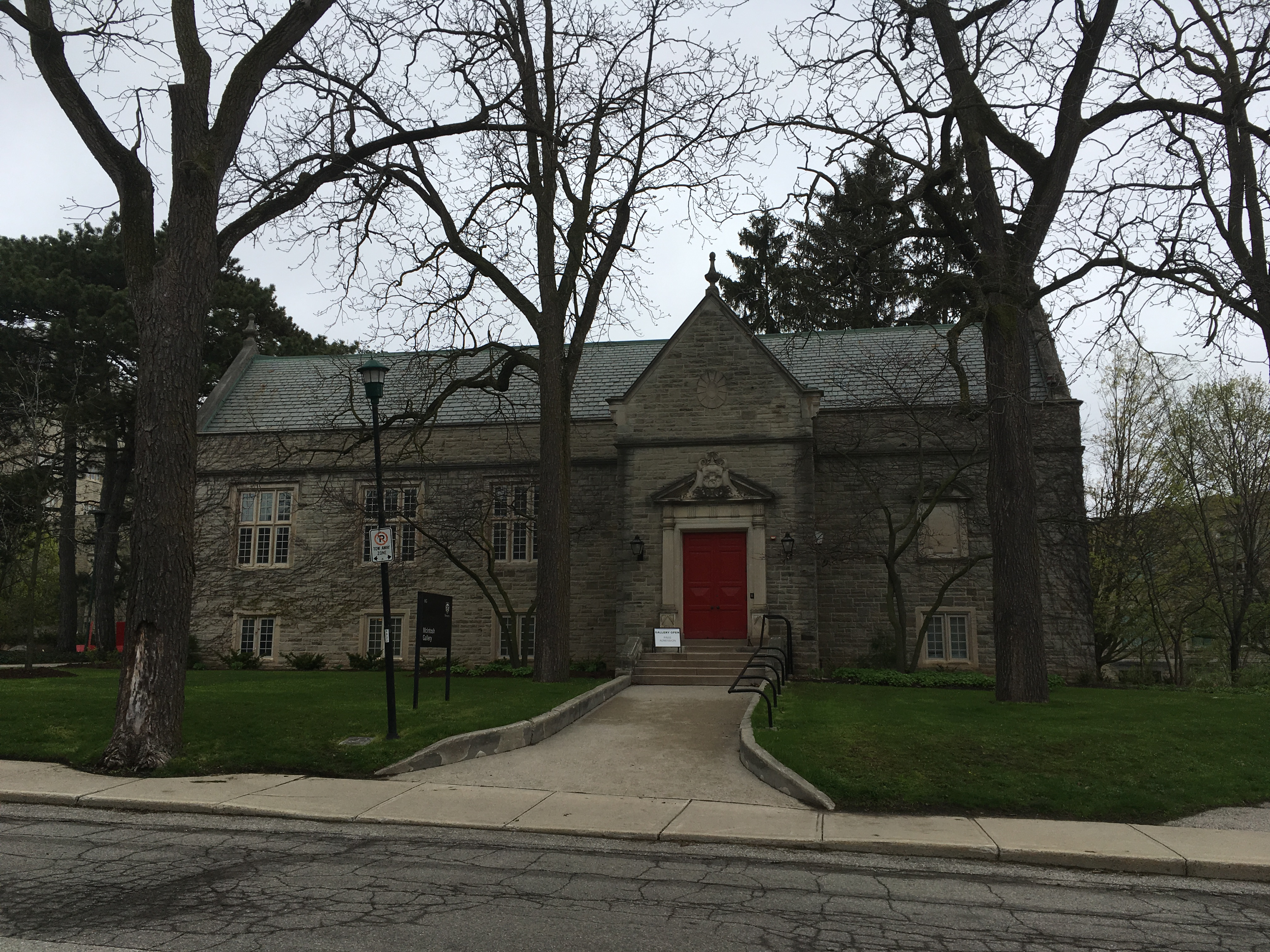
McIntosh Gallery is one of two art galleries located on its campus.

Western also operates two art galleries, the Artlab Gallery, and the McIntosh Gallery. Located in the John Labatt Visual Arts Centre, the Artlab Gallery showcases approximately 14 projects per year, exploring conceptual and experimental production through a wide range of media. The Artlab Gallery also aims to assist in the research and practices of students and faculty members. The McIntosh Gallery is a university-based, public art gallery, opened since 1942. The gallery is a presentation and dissemination centre for the university, as well as the London community, showcasing advanced practices and research in art history and contemporary visual art. The gallery is the oldest university art gallery in the province of Ontario, initially opened as an exhibition of paintings by war artists from the National Gallery of Canada. 683 works of the Gallery's collection were put on display throughout the university's main campus through the Gallery's ArtShare program in 2014.

Western also maintains academic and administrative links with the Museum of Ontario Archaeology. The Museum originally grew out of a collection of artifacts housed in various buildings throughout London, including Western's University College, and Middlesex College. Formally opened on 28 February 1978, its creation was facilitated by the university president and Western's Faculty of Social Science. Although the museum was incorporated as an independent charitable organization, without the ability to share capital, its directors continued to be appointed by the university's Board of Governors.

=== Housing and student facilities ===
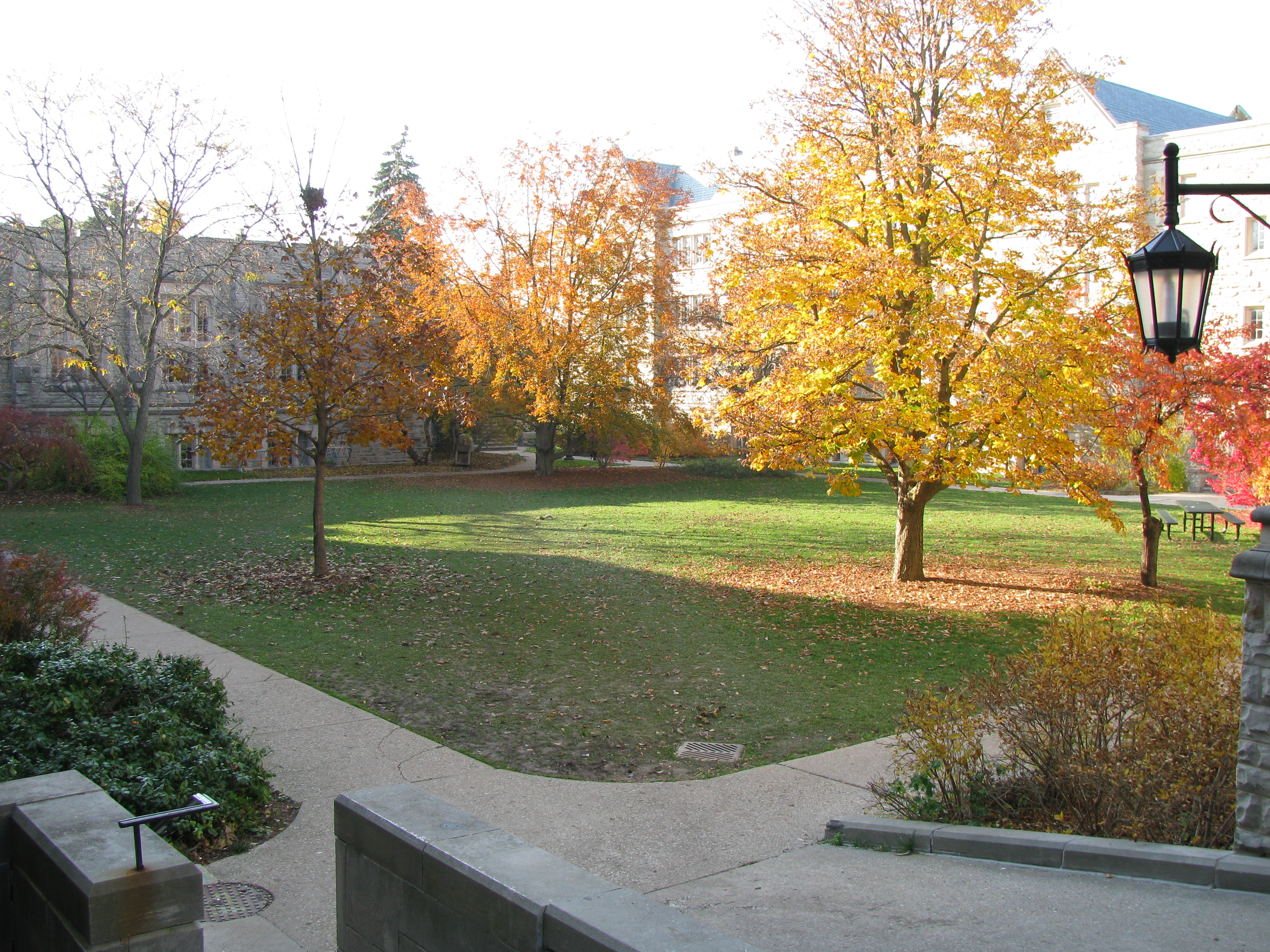
Sydenham Quad within Medway-Sydenham Hall, one of nine student residences at the university's campus

The main campus of The University of Western Ontario offers student housing, with nine student residences housing either first-year students or upper-year students. In September 2015, 23.49 per cent of the undergraduate population lived on campus, including 78.69 per cent of all first-year students. Each residence operates their own Residences' Council, governed by their own constitutions. Student residence building are split between traditional-styled residences, suite-styled residences, and hybrid-style residences that incorporate elements of traditional and suite-styled residences.

Traditional-styled residences include Delaware Hall, Medway-Sydenham Hall, and Saugeen-Maitland Hall. Suite-styled residences include Alumni House, Elgin Hall, Essex Hall, London Hall and Lambton Hall. Hybrid-styled residences include Perth Hall, Ontario Hall, Bayfield Hall and Clare Hall. Alumni House, London Hall, Bayfield Hall and Lambton Hall were reserved strictly for upper-year students when built but later turned into residences for first year students due to demand. The largest residential building at the university is Saugeen–Maitland Hall, which houses 1,252 first-year students.

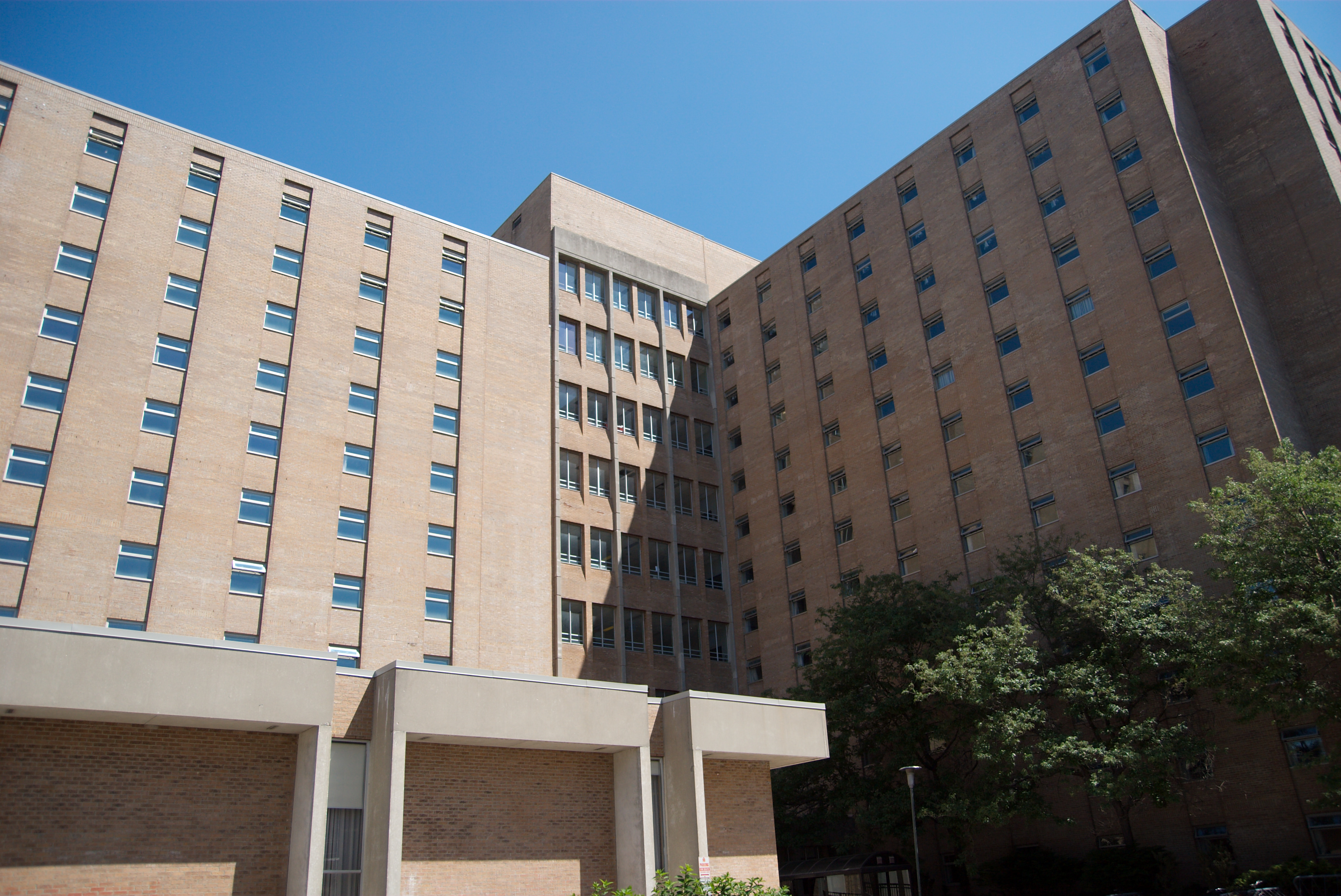
Saugeen-Maitland Hall is the largest student residence operated by the university.

The University Community Centre acts as Western's student activity centre, and is the university's centre of student governance and student directed social, cultural, entertainment and recreational activities. The University Community Centre contains the offices the University Students' Council. The graduate student union, the Society of Graduate Students, is located in the Middlesex College building.

=== Off-campus facilities ===
In addition to The University of Western Ontario's central campus, the university owns several other properties throughout Southwestern Ontario. Excluding Western's central campus, as well as the campuses of Western's affiliated university colleges, Western owns approximately 309.6 hectares (765 acres) of land. Included among these properties is a number of research facilities. Managed under Western Research Parks, the facilities are clustered into three research parks. The three parks serve as a research link between academics and corporations.

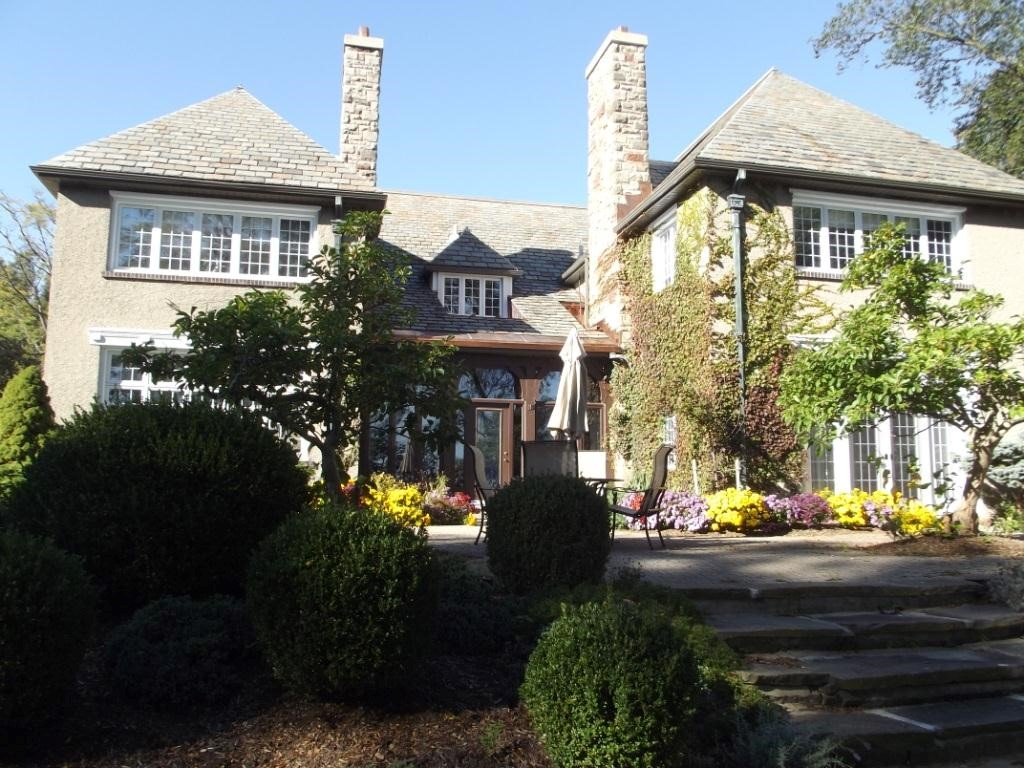
Gibbons Lodge serves as the official residence for the University President. It is one of several university-owned properties outside its main campus.

The oldest research park operated by Western is Discovery Park, adjacent to the university's main campus. The 16.2 hectares (40 acres) research park was established in 1989, with tenants ranging from national government laboratories, to large-multi-industrial research centres. Discovery Park also includes a 48-room hotel and conference centre, Windermere Manor. The Advanced Manufacturing Park is another research park established through a partnership between Western, Fanshawe College and the City of London. Advanced Manufacturing Park is a 52.6 hectares (130 acres) research park, built in an area zoned for full-scale manufacturing and large-scale research. The WindEEE Dome is among the facilities built in the Advanced Manufacturing Park. The WindEEE Dome is the world's first hexagonal wind tunnel, allowing for scientists to address certain challenges related to wind. The structure is able to accommodate replicas of buildings, and bridges to test for structural integrity in a variety of wind conditions. The facility is able to physically simulate high intensity wind systems, including tornados, and downbursts hard to replicate in other wind tunnels. In 2003, Western opened another research park known as the Sarnia-Lambton Research park, in a joint initiative with Lambton County, and Sarnia. The 32.4 hectares (80 acres) research park is adjacent to Lambton College and is home to Canada's largest clean technology business incubator.

The university also manages several residences outside the central campus. The official residence of the university president, Gibbons Lodge, is off-campus. Completed in 1932, the Tudor Revival-styled house is north of Western's central campus. It was acquired by the university in 1960. In addition to Gibbons Lodge, the university also maintains Platt's Lane Estates, a complex of townhouses and apartments south of the university's campus. The complex was designed to accommodate upper-year, graduate, and students with families.

=== Sustainability ===
Campus sustainability at Western is managed by the President's Advisory Committee on Environment & Sustainability. The committee's mandate includes incorporating sustainability into the academic programming, engaging in research across the disciplines into issues of environmental sustainability, using ecological landscaping methods and preserving green space and building and renovating facilities in accordance with energy efficiency and sustainability principles Along with the other members of the Council of Ontario Universities, Western had signed a pledge in 2009 known as Ontario Universities Committed to a Greener World, with the objective of transforming its campus into a model of environmental responsibility. Western is also a signatory of the Talloires Declaration, a sustainability declaration created for presidents of higher education. The university campus received a B− grade from the Sustainable Endowments Institute on its College Sustainability Report Card for 2011.

== Administration ==
The university's governance is conducted through the Board of Governors and the Senate. The Senate was the university's first governing body, created in the university's founding document, An Act to Incorporate the Western University of London, Ontario, 1878. The Board of Governors was later established in An Act to amend the Act to incorporate the Western University of London, Ontario, 1892. The Board is responsible for the university's management, including financial matters. Ex officio governors of the Board include the university's chancellor, president, the mayor of London, the warden of Middlesex County and the secretary of the Board of Governors. The Board also consists of 26 other governors either appointed or elected by the members of the university's community and the surrounding community, including elected representatives from the student body.

The Senate is responsible for the university's academic policies. The Senate consists of 20 ex officio positions in the Senate granted to the chancellor, the president, the university's vice-presidents, the senior dean of each faculty, the university librarian and the secretary of the senate. The secretary of the senate is a non-voting ex officio member. The Senate also consists of 46 elected members from the university's faculty, 18 members from the student population, and 9 members from the Western's affiliated colleges, including their principals. The Senate also consists of 9 other members from around the university community. In all, there are 103 members of the Senate, 102 of which may vote and 10–13 official observers of the Senate.

The president and vice-chancellor acts as the university's chief executive officer, accountable to the Board of Governors and the Senate, by supervising and directing the university's academic and administrative work and its teaching and non-teaching staff. Alan Shepard is the tenth president of the university, who began his tenure as president on 1 July 2019. In 2022, Shepard was the highest paid President of any Ontario university, receiving $520,000 in salary and benefits. The chancellor of the university acts as the honorary and symbolic head of the university. The position of chancellor is a four-year, non-renewable term. The university's current chancellor is Kelly Meighen, who was appointed to the position on 1 July 2023.

=== Affiliated institutions ===
The University of Western Ontario is currently affiliated with two university colleges.

Huron University College was founded in 1863, originally established as Huron College, and renamed Huron University College in 2000. Huron's affiliation with Western was authorized in Western's first provincial charter, in 1878. Both Huron and Western share the same progenitor in Bishop Issac Hellmuth. Huron moved to its present location, adjacent to Western's central campus, in 1951. King's University College was founded in 1954, as a Catholic-based liberal arts college. Founded as Christ the King's College, it changed its name to King's College in 1966, and King's University College in 2004. Regardless of the university college's religious affiliation, enrolment in those institutions is not restricted based on the student's religious beliefs.

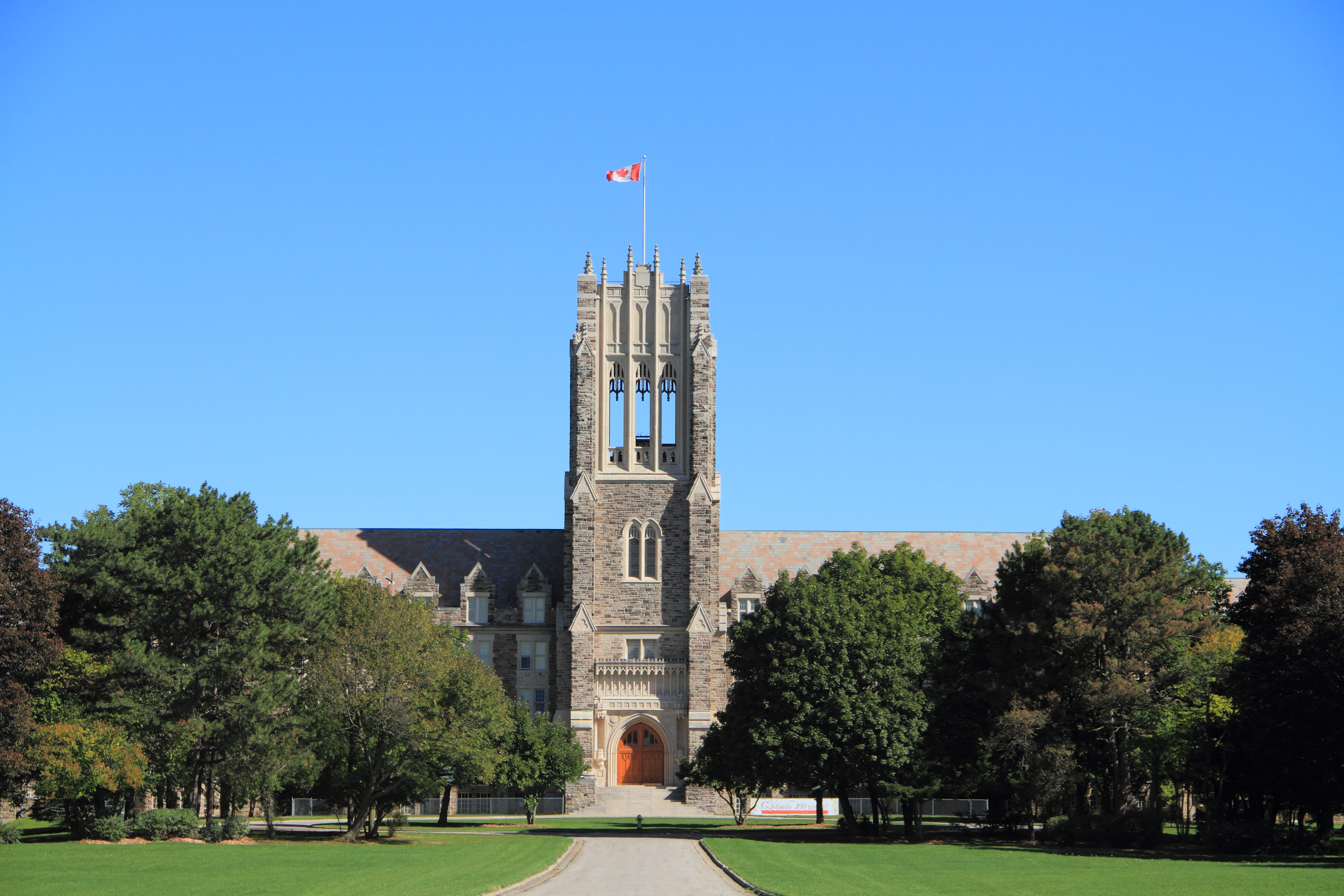
St. Peter's Seminary is an affiliated institution of Western.

In addition to the two university colleges, Western also maintains an affiliation with St. Peter's Seminary through its affiliation with King's University College. Founded in 1912, St. Peters was opened as the seminary for the Roman Catholic Diocese of London. The campuses of King's University College and St. Peter's Seminary are east of Richmond Street and the university's central campus.

From 1919 until 2024, Western was also affiliated with Brescia University College, an all-women's Catholic-based university college and the last remaining women's college in Canada until its dissolution. Founded by the Ursulines in 1919, an affiliation agreement with Western was arranged shortly after its founding, with Brescia campus moving adjacent to Western's central campus in 1925. Brescia College began integration with Western's main campus in September 2023, and ceased operations in May 2024.

== Academics ==
Western is a publicly funded research university, and a member of the Association of Universities and Colleges of Canada. The full-time undergraduate programs comprise the majority of the school's enrolment, made up of 30,665 full-time, part-time undergraduate students and concurrent education students. The graduate student population is 5,297, including full-time students, part-time students and post-graduate medical residents. The university conferred 4,504 bachelor's degrees, 207 doctoral degrees, 1,427 master's degrees, and 1,180 second entry professional degrees in 2008–2009. Students may apply for financial aid such as the Ontario Student Assistance Program and Canada Student Loans and Grants through the federal and provincial governments. The financial aid may come in loans, grants, bursaries, scholarships, fellowships, debt reduction, interest relief, and work programs.

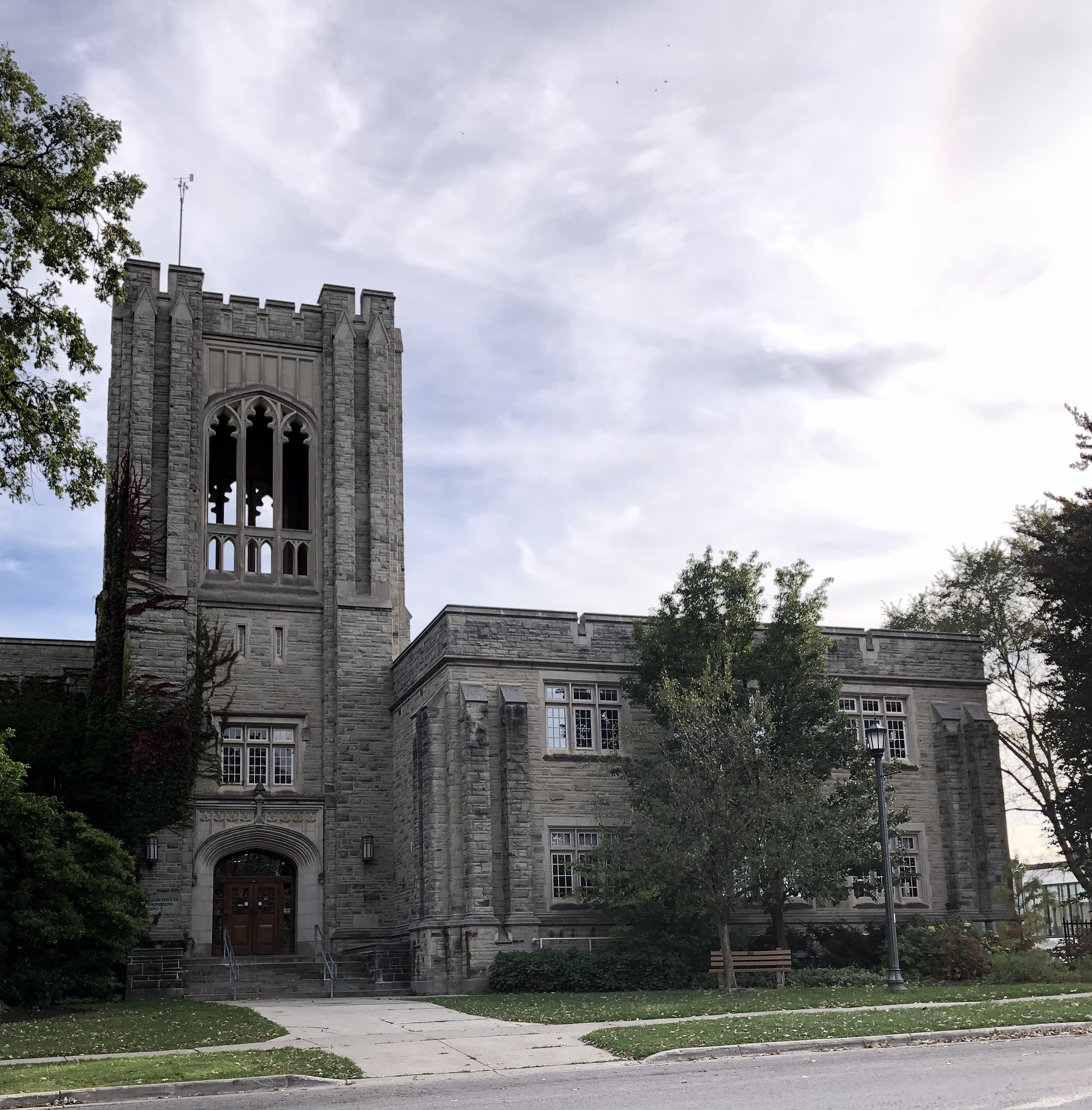
The Spencer Engineering Building is used by Western's Faculty of Engineering. The faculty is one of eleven faculties at the university.

The university is divided into 11 faculties and schools including the Don Wright Faculty of Music, the Faculty of Arts & Humanities, Faculty of Education, Faculty of Engineering, Faculty of Health Sciences, Faculty of Information & Media Studies, Faculty of Law, Faculty of Science, Faculty of Social Science, Ivey School of Business, and the Schulich School of Medicine & Dentistry. In September 2016, most undergraduates at Western was enrolled in the Faculty of Social Sciences, with 7,114 full-time and part-time undergraduate students in enrolled in one of their programs. In the same year, the Faculty of Health Science held the highest enrolment among graduate students at Western, with 821 full-time and part-time graduate students enrolled in the faculty. The School Graduate and Postdoctoral Studies is the university's central administrative unit of graduate education. However, it is not considered its own faculty or academic school.

Admission requirements at Western differ depending upon the education system where the applicant originates from, due to the lack of uniformity in marking schemes. In September 2012 secondary school average for full-time first-year students at Western was 89.3 per cent. For admission in the fall of 2013, there were 45,000 applications for 4,900 spaces.

The university also offers students the opportunity to earn credits while studying abroad, through student exchange programs, and internship, faculty-led international excursions, and clinical placements.

=== Rankings and reputation ===
University rankings

World rankings
- ARWU World: 201–300
- QS World: =120
- QS Employability: 43
- THE World: 201–250
- USNWR World: 311
- 9–12

Canadian rankings
- QS National: 6
- THE National: 9–10
- USNWR National: 10
- Maclean's Medical/Doctoral: 11
- Maclean's Reputation: 9

In the 2022 Academic Ranking of World Universities rankings, the university ranked 201–300 in the world and 9–12 in Canada. The 2024 QS World University Rankings ranked the university 114th in the world and sixth in Canada. The 2023 Times Higher Education World University Rankings ranked Western 201–250 in the world, and 8–10 in Canada. In U.S. News & World Report 2022–23 global university rankings, the university placed 300th in the world, and tenth in Canada. In Maclean's 2023 rankings, Western placed 11th in their Medical-Doctoral university category, tied with Université Laval. The university also ranked 13th in Maclean reputation category.

The university has also placed in a number of rankings that evaluated the employment prospects of its graduates. In QS's 2022 graduate employability ranking, the university ranked 43rd in the world, and third in Canada.

The university is ranked among the top 1% of higher education institutions worldwide.

=== Research ===
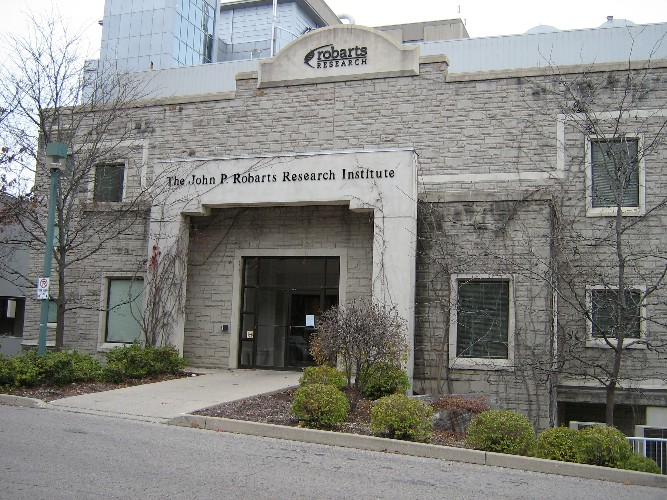
Robarts Research Institute is a medical research facility at Western's campus. More than 600 people conduct basic and clinical research at the facility.

Western has four primary fields of research: life sciences and the human condition, culture analysis and values, the human and physical environments, and social trends, public policy, and economic activity. In Research Infosource's 2018 ranking of Canadian research universities, Western was ranked 10th; with a sponsored research income (external funding) of $249.669 million in 2017. In 2017, members of Western's faculty averaged a sponsored research income of $166,100, while graduate students averaged a sponsored research income $41,600. The federal government is the largest source of funding providing 46% of Western's research budget, primarily through grants. Private corporations contribute 10 per cent of Western's research budget.

Western's research performance has been noted in several bibliometric university rankings, which uses citation analysis to evaluate the impact a university has on academic publications. In 2019, the Performance Ranking of Scientific Papers for World Universities ranked Western 197th in the world, and ninth in Canada, whereas the University Ranking by Academic Performance 2018–19 rankings placed the university 187th in the world, and ninth in Canada.

Research regarding the human brain has also become a major focus at the university. The Brain and Mind Institute focuses on research in cognitive neuroscience at Western. In 2011, the Institute discovered the blind may perform echolocation by using the visual cortex of the brain. Another 2011 study at Western suggested people who are deaf from birth may be able to reassign the area of their brain used for hearing to boost their sight. Western also is home to the Institute for Earth and Space Exploration, the first dedicated space institute providing a planetary science degree in Canada.

In 2014, the university unveiled plans for a 4,200-square-foot facility for research in medicine, science and technology, in the study of HIV and other complex human pathogens. Schulich School of Medicine & Dentistry's Department of Microbiology and Immunology is globally recognized, in large part due to the groundbreaking discoveries of Dr. Chil-Yong Kang, a Western researcher clinically testing a preventive HIV/AIDS vaccine. SAV001-H is the first and only preventive HIV vaccine based on a genetically modified killed whole HIV-1 virus. The United States Food and Drug Administration (FDA) Phase I clinical trial was completed in August 2013 and reported no serious adverse effects while boosting antibodies in the volunteers. The vaccine SAV001-H holds tremendous promise, having already proven to stimulate strong immune responses in preliminary toxicology tests. It is the only HIV vaccine under development in Canada, and one of only a few in the world.

== Student life ==
Demographics of student body (2017–18) (Note: The following includes full-time, and part-time students enrolled at the university. The following figures do not include students enrolled with an affiliate institutions of Western, including Brescia, King, and Huron university colleges.)
	Undergraduate (Note: The following includes students enrolled in a first professional degree program.)	Graduate
Male	43.9%	45.0%
Female	56.1%	55.0%
Canadian student	90.1%	78.0%
International student	9.9%	22.0%

The two main student unions on administrative and policy issues is the University Students' Council for all undergraduate students and the Society of Graduate Students for graduate students.

The University Students' Council (USC) is a student-led organization that exists to advocate for and support the undergraduate students. The University Students' Commission was created in 1930 as a coordinating body between the existing Students' Administrative Assembly (SAA), a 22-member body including representatives from each class in Arts and Sciences Faculty Councils, and the Hippocratic Council. In 1947 the name was officially changed to "University Students' Council".

Today, USC is a nonprofit organization incorporated on March 29, 1965, under the Ontario Nonprofit Corporations Act. Its membership consists of the roughly 38,000 undergraduate students enrolled at the university. Policy papers are approved by Council, and focus on evidence-based advocacy, with recommendations informed by both research and student consultation. Part of the Ontario Undergraduate Student Alliance, the USC also engages in advocacy at multiple levels of government, and across the university.

The University Students' Council recognizes more than 220 student organizations and clubs, in which more than 15,000 students are a member. These clubs and organizations cover a wide range of interests such as academics, culture, religion, social issues, and recreation. The University Students' Council also provides additional services such as two pub/restaurants (The Spoke and The Wave), and clothing store (The Purple Store). A student run drop-in food bank addresses increasing food insecurity among students, and a Peer Support Centre provides a safe space and resource hub for students to prioritize their well-being. A USC run movie theatre named "Western Film" screened second-run movies at cheap prices from the mid-1980s until closing during the COVID-19 pandemic.

The USC collects fees and provides administrative support to two campus media outlets: The Gazette, a student newspaper which has been in publication since 1906, and RadioWestern, an FM radio station broadcasting to the London area.

There are a number of fraternities and sororities existing throughout the student community, however, in 2021 the USC voted to remove special privileges for fraternities.

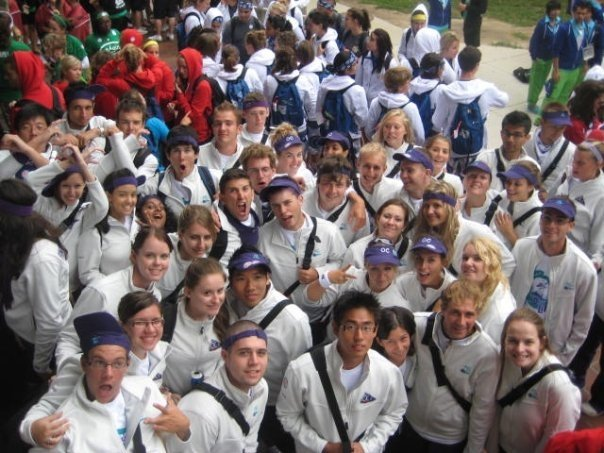
O-week at Western is a week of activities to orient and welcome new students.

=== Athletics ===
Athletics at Western is managed by Sports & Recreation Services, a division of the Faculty of Health Sciences. The university's varsity teams compete in the Ontario University Athletics conference of U Sports. The varsity teams are known as the Western Mustangs. As is mandatory for all members of U Sports, Western does not provide full-ride athletic scholarships.

The university has a number of athletic facilities open to their varsity teams and their students. The Western Student Recreation Centre, opened in January 2009, is home to Western's group fitness, drop in recreation, registered massage therapy, sport psychology, drop in recreation, intramural sports and clubs. Better known as the WSRC or the Rec Centre, this facility has an 8-lane, 50-metre pool facility and several gyms.

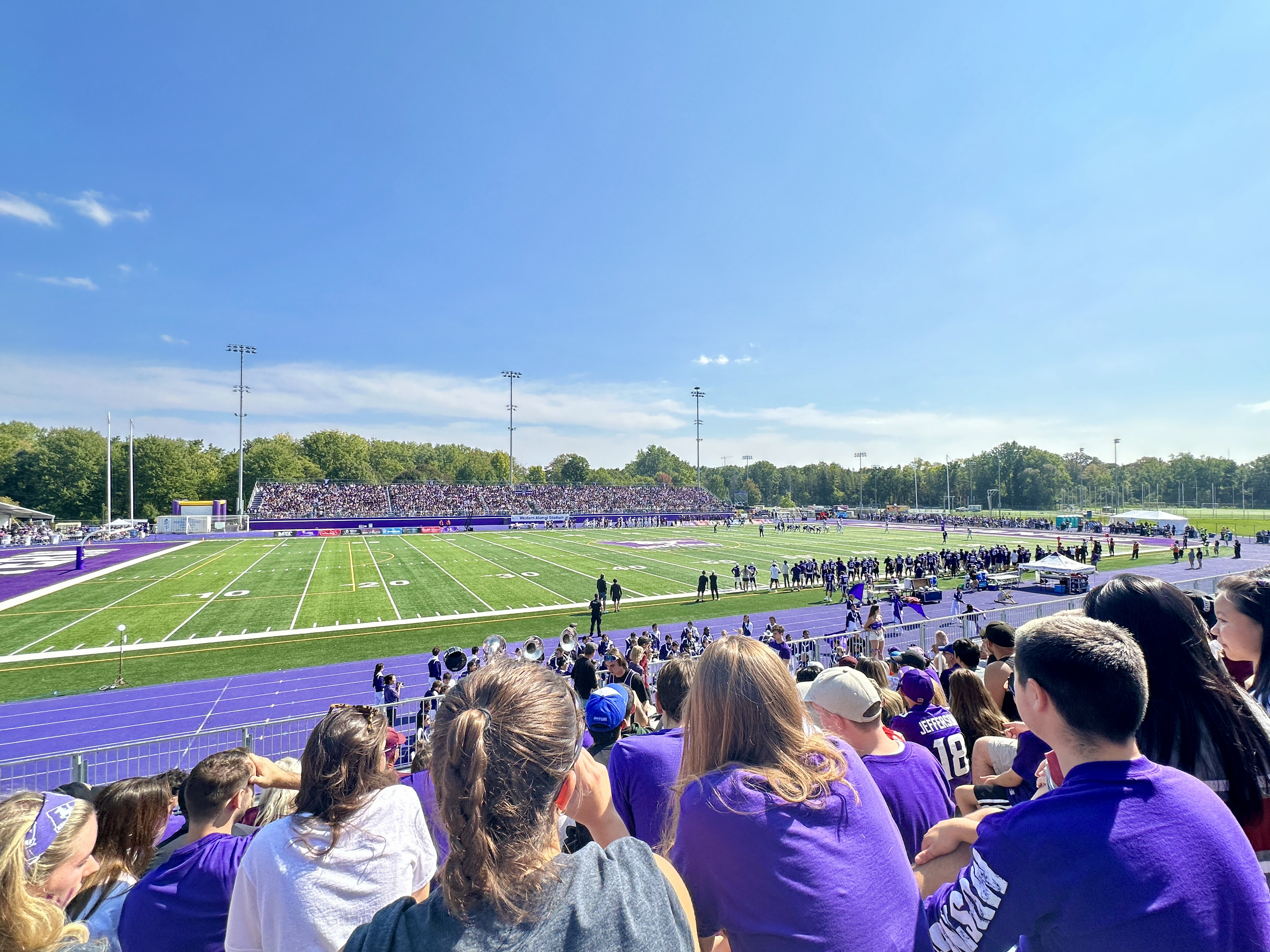
The Western Mustangs compete in a number of sports, including Canadian football.

Western Alumni Stadium (Formerly TD Stadium) has been the university's main stadium since it opened in 2000, with a seating capacity of over 8,000 spectators. The stadium is home to the university's varsity football team, and has hosted a number of events including the World Lacrosse Championships and the Canada Games. The Thompson Recreation & Athletic Centre which houses a number of athletic venues, including an ice rink, tennis facilities and a track, is home to the varsity ice hockey teams and the varsity track and field teams. Another athletic facility at the university is Alumni Hall, which is a multipurpose venue for sports such as basketball, volleyball and other indoor events.

Many Western students take part in intramural sport leagues and tournaments. Opportunities are offered at multiple skill levels and across a variety of sports. Sports offered include traditional sports like volleyball, basketball and soccer, as well as less traditional events like dodgeball and inner tube water polo. Western also hosts secondary school football games at TD Stadium. Western has several fight songs and school songs that may be heard at varsity games, including the official school song, "Western". Written in 1930, it is most notably played at football games and other athletic events by the Western Mustang Band.

=== Performances ===
The Don Wright Faculty of Music offers almost 400 performances, masterclasses and recitals each year, most of which are open to the public. The Western University Symphony Orchestra and the Western University Chamber Orchestra perform regularly. UWOpera performs a wide variety of repertoire ranging from operetta to full operatic works in the Paul Davenport Theatre (refurbished and renamed in 2009 from Talbot Theatre). There are other student-run drama groups that puts on shows every year.

=== Media ===
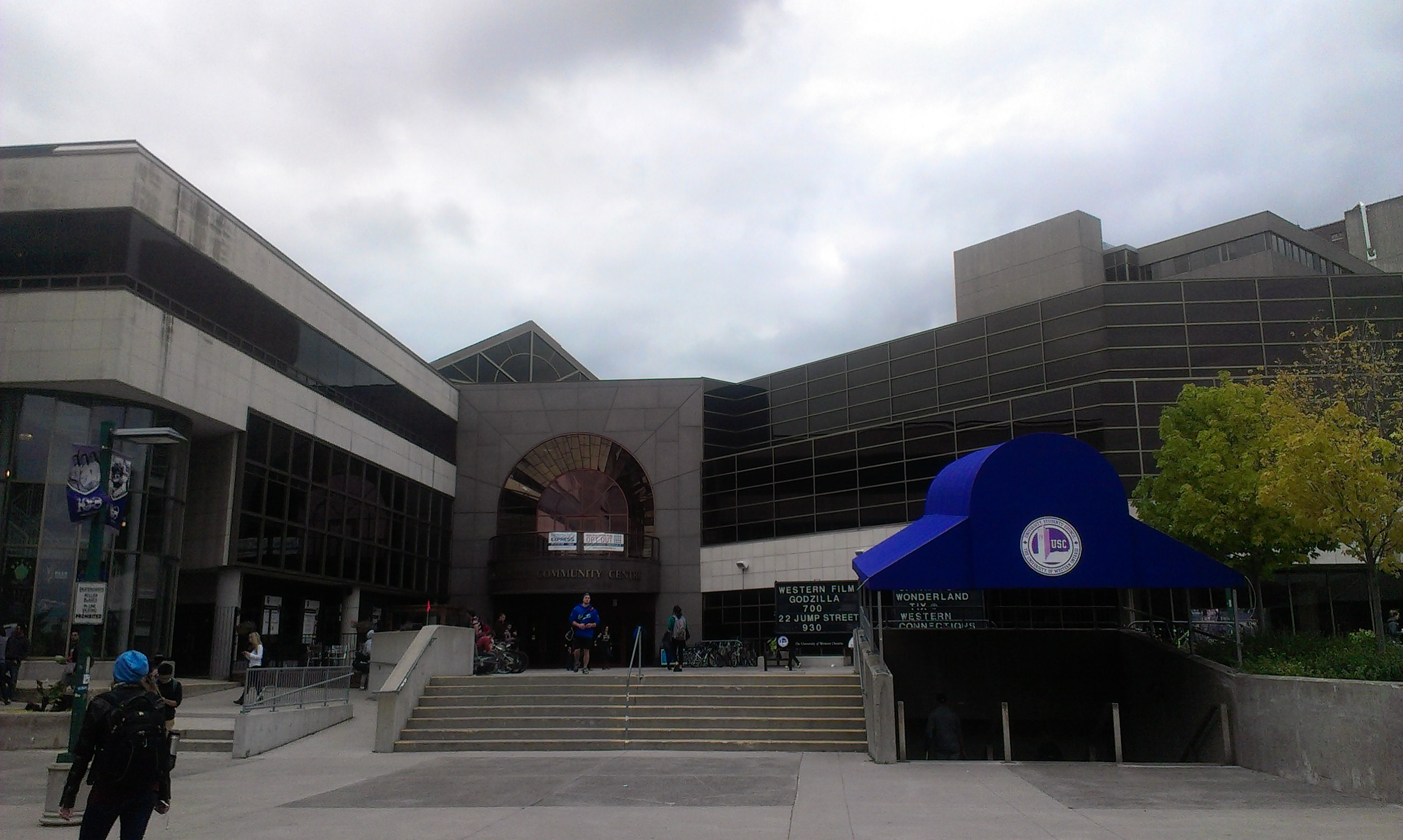
The University Community Centre is a student centre that houses a number of student-run organizations, including a campus radio station, and a student newspaper.

The university's student population operates a number of media outlets throughout the campus environment. The University Students' Council owns and operates the campus radio station CHRW-FM (94.9 FM). The first campus radio to operate at Western was in 1971, although the present day station RadioWestern, was not established until 1979, one year after the closure of the Western's first campus radio station.

The University Students' Council previously operated a closed-circuit television station known as tvWestern.ca. The station began broadcasting in 1994, and was discontinued by the student union in 2010 after being cut from the University Students' Council's operating budget.

==== Newspaper ====
The Gazette, sometimes called the Western Gazette, is a student newspaper which has been in publication since 1906. The Gazette has its roots as a hand-written literature newspaper called In Cap And Gown, which began in 1902. The In Cap And Gown was first produced in newsprint in November 1906, but changed its name to The Gazette in 1908. The Gazette ceased publishing in the spring of 1916 due to World War 1 but was revived in 1919. In 1930, seven years after Western University changed its name to the University of Western Ontario, the paper changed its name to the University of Western Ontario Gazette. The Gazette started as monthly but in its early years appeared weekly and twice weekly. The Gazette was in print four days a week from 1991 to 2015, making it the only student newspaper in Canada to be considered a daily newspaper. In 2017, the Gazette began printing only once a week and shifted fully online in 2020 due to the COVID-19 pandemic. In 2021, the Gazette began a gradual return to print editions, focusing on special editions and introducing bi-weekly print issues in the fall of 2022.

The Gazette has spawned several other publications in its history. One was Occidentalia, which had its roots in special convocation issues of the Gazette which included pictures of the graduating class. The paper is owned and published by the University Students' Council (USC). The paper has editorial autonomy from the USC. The publications committee consists of mainly professional journalists who advise the full-time staff on editorial decisions and financial management of the paper, as well as offer an intermediary between the sometimes contentious relationship between the student politicians who are reported on by the Gazette. The paper is one of the founding members of the National University Wire. Gazette alumni have worked at many successful media networks including The Globe and Mail, Toronto Star, National Post, MacLean's, CBC, CTV, Al Jazeera, Sportsnet and The New York Times.

=== Student life programs ===
==== Leadership education ====
The Leadership Education Program is designed to teach students how to become effective leaders, both individually and in teams.

==== Student exchange ====
The University of Western Ontario offers a student exchange program to study abroad with several other partner institutions. Almost four hundred students come to Western each year as exchange students from abroad, with more students coming to Western as international undergraduate or exchange students. The Western International Exchange Program offers its students the opportunity to study at more than 85 different institutions in 25 countries.

=== Sexual violence ===
In 2014, Stanley Dobrowolski, a former staff psychiatrist for Western students, was convicted of sexual crimes against his patients. He pleaded guilty to 18 charges (16 of sexual assault, one for voyeurism, and one for disobeying court orders) and was sentenced to four years in prison. Dobrowolski had been a psychiatrist at Western until 1995. The university issued an apology for Dobrowolski's actions on 16 March 2016.

The university is known for its party culture, ranking seventh in Canada by Maclean's party school 2019 rankings.

In September 2021, several students were alleged to have been sexually assaulted during Western's orientation week. The incidents surfaced after numerous reports of sexual assault, many facilitated by drugs, surfaced on the internet. The resulting incidents has resulted in some criticism against the university for failing to protect female students from rape culture. These events took place during a period known as the "Red Zone." This is the period encompassing the first eight weeks of the university school year in which 50% of sexual-assaults take place. In the same week, a first-year Western student was killed near the university; a suspect was later charged with manslaughter in connection with the incident. On March 2, 2022, the University Students' Council unanimously passed a motion declaring a Sexual and Gender-Based Violence crisis on campus. This followed nationally discussed allegations of a mass drugging and widespread sexual-assault during the 2021/2022 Orientation Week, which culminated with the arrest and expulsion of some students.

== Notable people ==
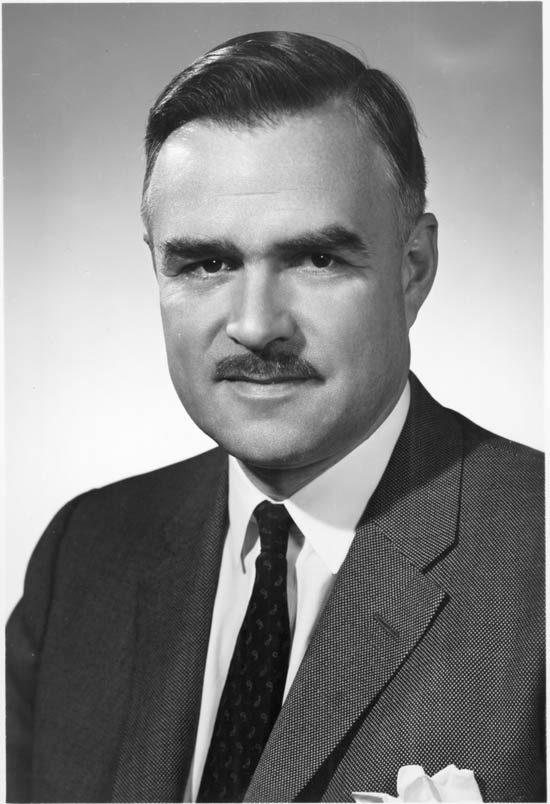
John Robarts, 17th Premier of Ontario

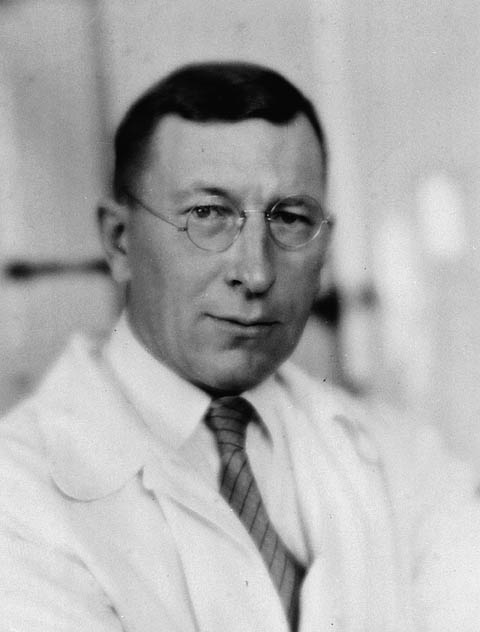
Sir Frederick Banting, awarded the Nobel Prize for the first use of insulin on humans

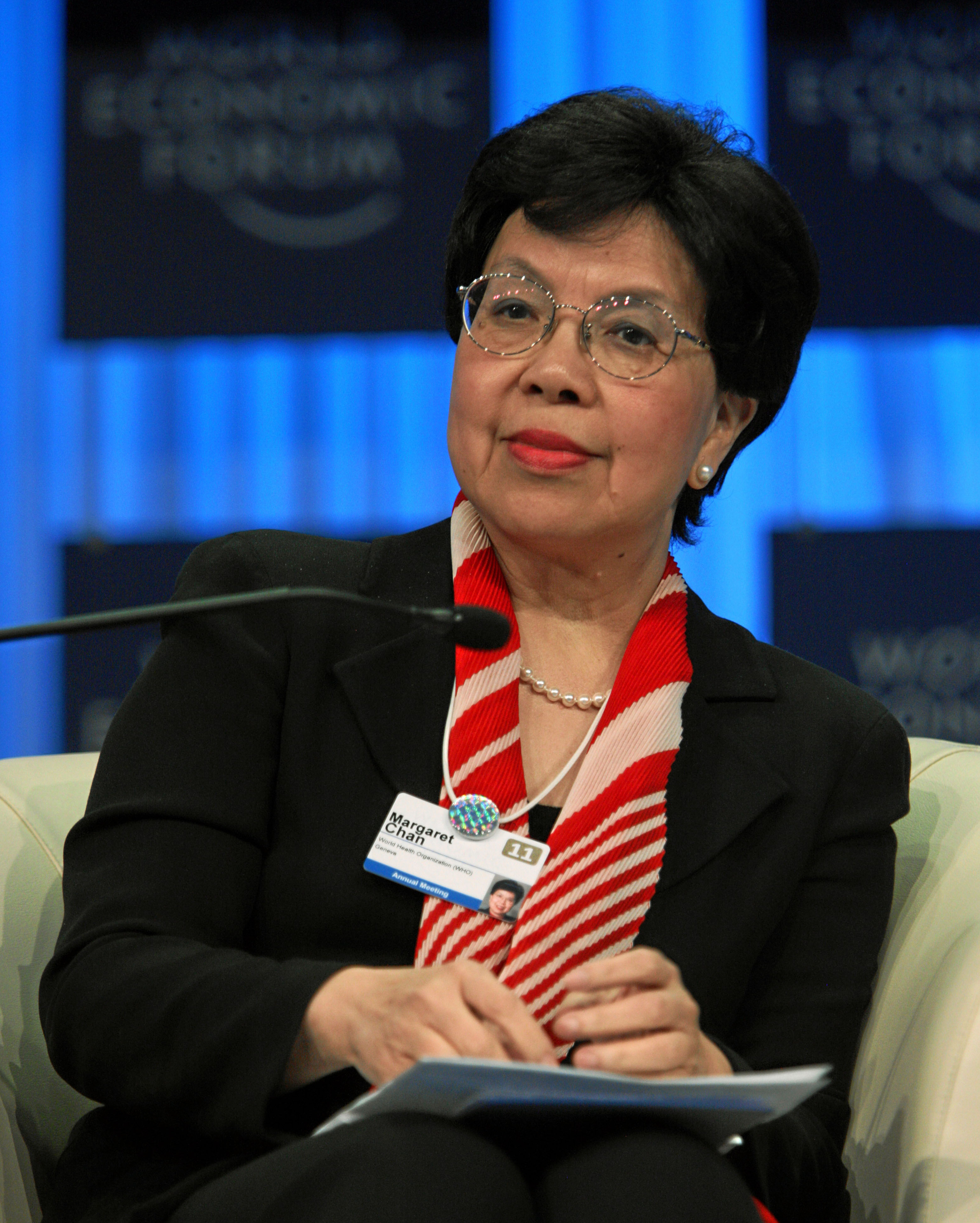
Margaret Chan, 7th Director General of the World Health Organization

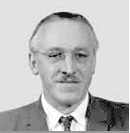
J. Carson Mark, mathematician and member of the Manhattan Project

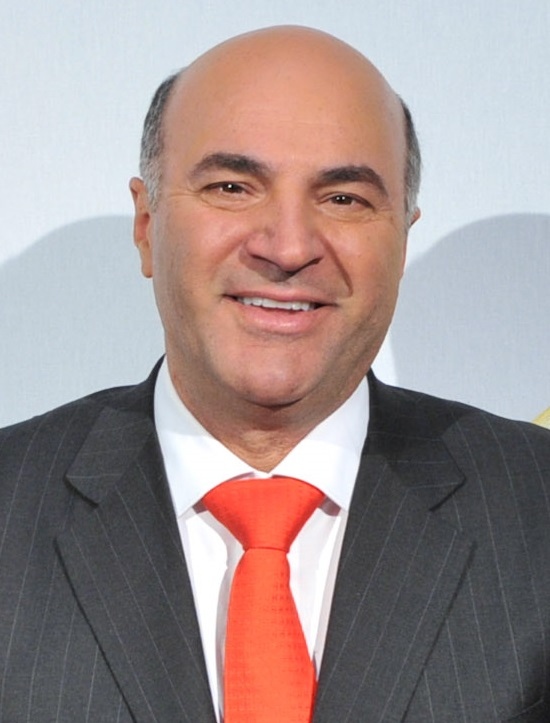
Kevin O'Leary, president of The Learning Company and television personality

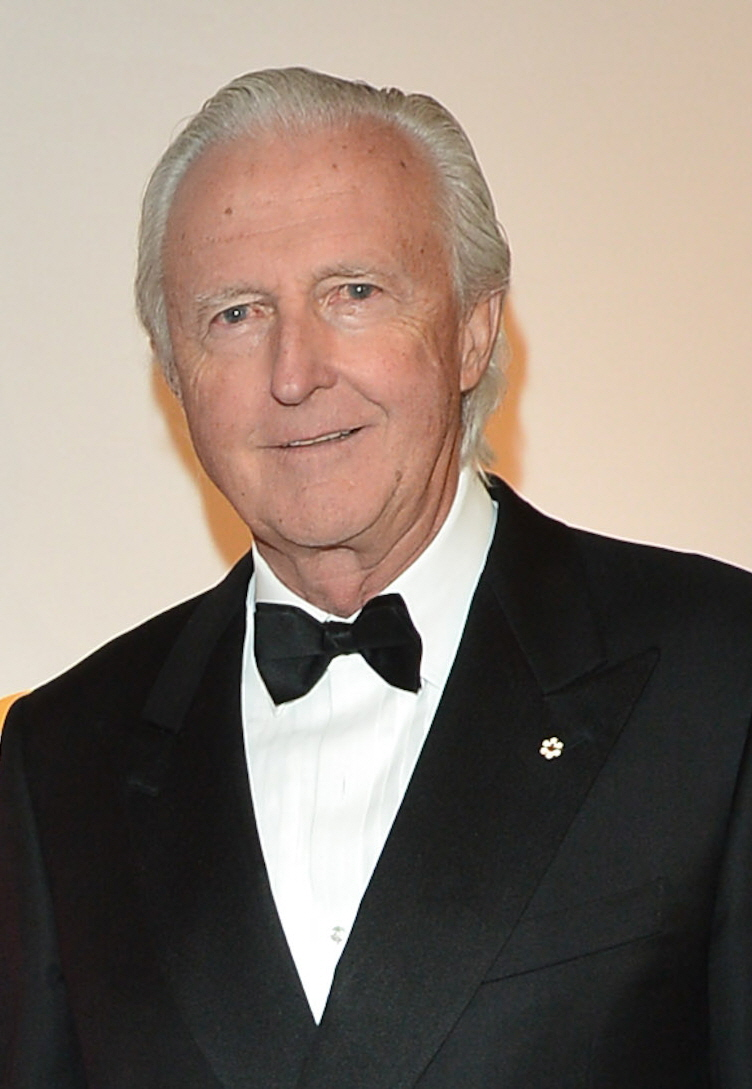
Galen Weston, chairman of George Weston Limited

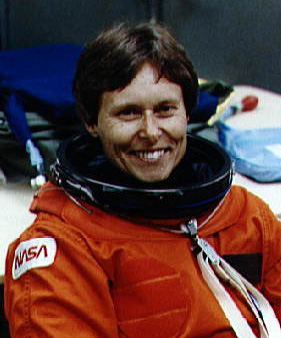
Roberta Bondar, CSA astronaut and the first Canadian female in space

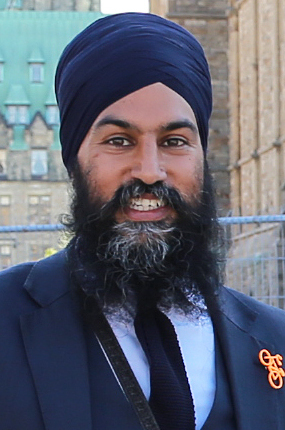
Jagmeet Singh, former leader of the New Democratic Party

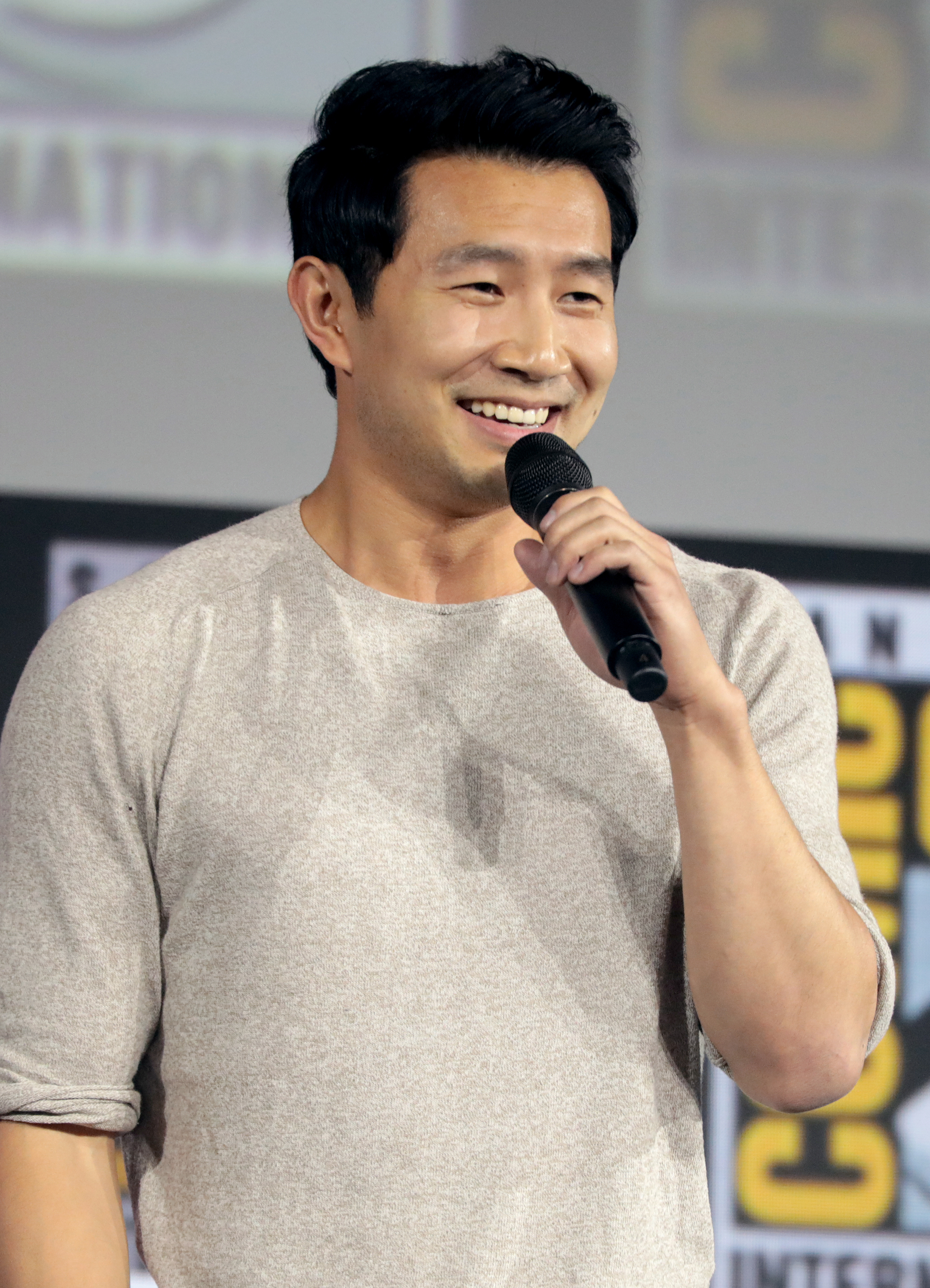
Simu Liu, Canadian actor

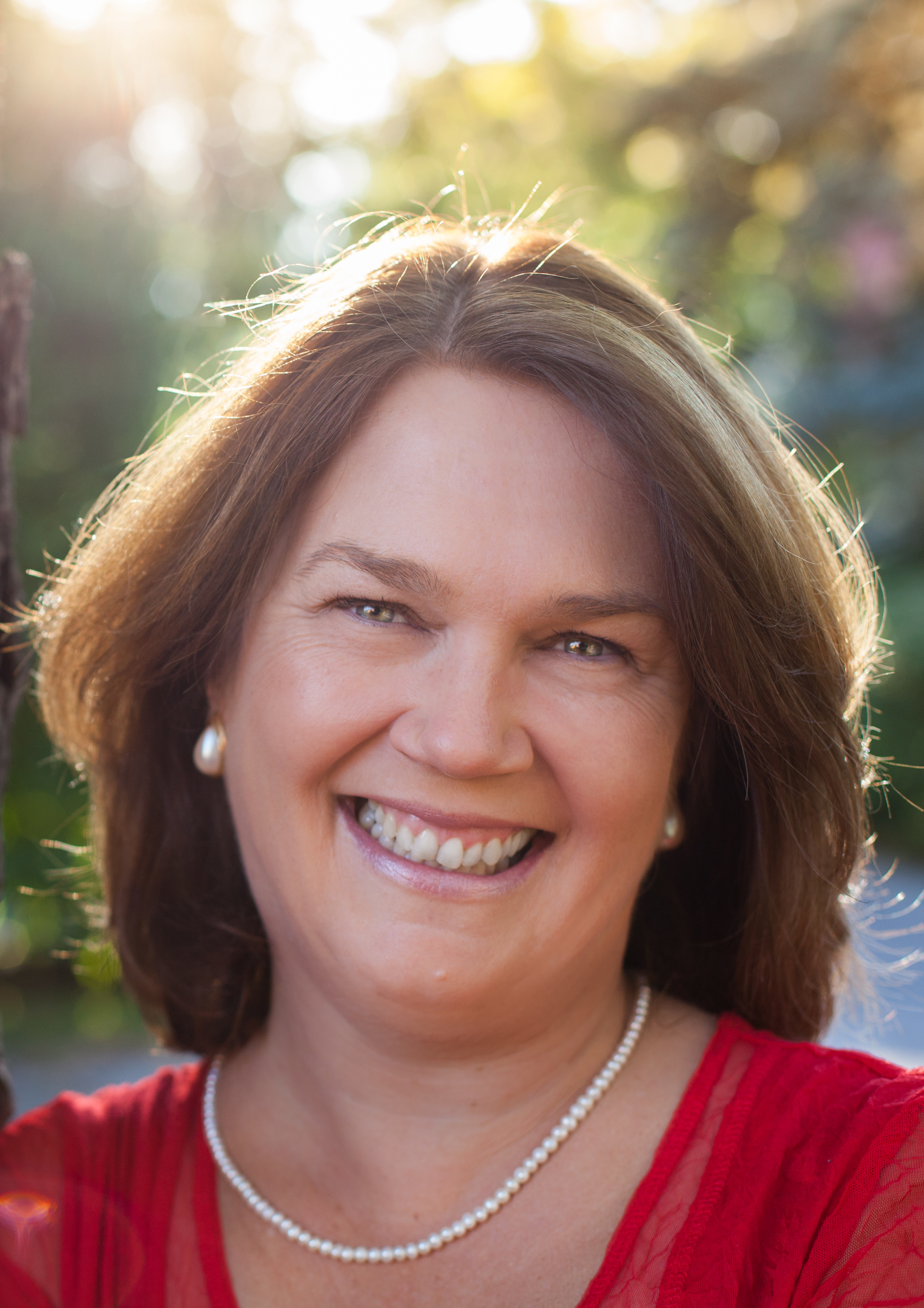
Jane Philpott, Canadian physician, academic, and former Canadian politician

As of November 2007, the University of Western Ontario has over 220,000 alumni residing in over 100 countries. Throughout Western's history, faculty, alumni, and former students have played prominent roles in many different fields and have won the Nobel Prize, Pulitzer Prize and other awards such as the Rhodes Scholarship.

Former faculty member Frederick Banting received the Nobel Prize in Physiology or Medicine for his discovery of insulin. Alice Munro, who won the Nobel Prize in Literature in 2013, studied in the university's English department for two years under a scholarship and returned to Western in 1974–1975, when she held the post of writer-in-residence. She was later awarded an honorary degree. Former faculty member from 1972 to 1996 Peter Howitt, who had received his MA in economics at the university in 1969, was awarded the Nobel Memorial Prize in Economic Sciences in 2025 for the theory of sustained growth through "creative destruction", which work was published while he was at Western. He is an Honorary Professor in the Department of Economics.

Two graduates from Western have also travelled in space, namely Bjarni Tryggvason and Roberta Bondar.

Many former students have gained local and national prominence for serving in government, such as James Bartleman, who served as Lieutenant Governor of Ontario from 2002 to 2007, and Sheila Copps who served as Deputy Prime Minister of Canada. Western's alumni also include a number of provincial premiers, including former premiers of Ontario John Robarts and David Peterson, and the former premier of Alberta, Don Getty. Tiff Macklem is the current Governor, Bank of Canada, and Stephen Poloz was the previous Governor, Bank of Canada. Both Macklem and Poloz had earned their MA and PhD degrees in Economics at Western. A number of graduates have also served prominent positions on the international level. Examples include Glenn Stevens, the Governor of the Reserve Bank of Australia and Margaret Chan, the Director-General of the World Health Organization.

A significant number of prominent leaders in business and economics have also studied at Western. Examples include: Thomas H. Bailey, founder and former chairman of Janus Capital Group, Geoff Beattie, president of The Woodbridge Company and chairman of CTVglobemedia, George Cope, president and CEO of Bell Canada Enterprise, Joseph Muncaster, president of Canadian Tire, Edward Rogers III, deputy chairman of Rogers Communications, and former president of Rogers Cable, Arkadi Kuhlmann, chairman of ING Direct, Rob McEwen, founder, chairman and former CEO of Goldcorp Inc., John Thompson, former chairman of Toronto-Dominion Bank and chancellor of Western, Prem Watsa, chairman, CEO of Fairfax Financial, Lee Seng Wee, former chairman of Oversea-Chinese Banking Corporation, Galen Weston, chairman and president of George Weston Limited, Howard Lindzon, author and founder of StockTwits, businesswoman Margaret Heng, CEO of Shatec, a Singapore-based hospitality training institution, Kevin O'Leary, television personality, venture capitalist, and former president of The Learning Company, Michael Katchen, co-founder, and CEO of WealthSimple, Donald K. Johnson Advisory Board, BMO Capital Markets, and George Cope, President, CEO, BCE Inc., Bell Canada

== Coat of arms ==
Coat of arms of University of Western Ontario
Notes Granted by the Canadian Heraldic Authority on 15 January 2014 Crest In front of a branch of maple Gules an open book proper edged and clasped Or. Escutcheon Per saltire Purpure and Argent in chief an open book proper edged and clasped Or in fess two hurts that to the dexter charged with a demi-stag contourné Argent that to the sinister charged with a demi-lion double-queued Ermine ducally crowned and in base a maple leaf, on a chief Or a sun rising Gules. Supporters Dexter a moose and sinister a lynx, both Or. Motto Veritas et Utilitas (Latin for 'Truth and usefulness')

== See also ==
- 15025 Uwontario
- Western Mustang Band
