= Medway-Sydenham Hall =

Coordinates: 43°0′29.77″N 81°15′48.78″W

- Interactive map of the Medway-Sydenham Hall area
- Former names: Medway Hall; Sydenham Hall
- Alternative names: "MedSyd"

General information
- Type: Student residence
- Architectural style: Collegiate Gothic
- Location: London, Ontario, Canada
- Opened: 1958 (Medway Hall); 1961 (Sydenham Hall)
- Owner: University of Western Ontario

Technical details
- Floor count: 3

Design and construction
- Main contractor: EllisDon

Medway-Sydenham Hall (also referred to as Med-Syd or MSH) is a co-ed residence at the University of Western Ontario. It is the third largest residence on campus, home to 613 students. It is also the oldest residence still operating on campus.

== History ==
Medway Hall was built in 1958 as an all-male residence. Sydenham Hall was built in 1961 as an all-male residence. Both buildings operated as separate all male residences and formed a strong rivalry during this time.

In 1986, Sydenham Hall was converted to an all-female residence as Medway Hall remained all male. Both halls remained single gender until 1997 when Medway Hall and Sydenham Hall both went co-ed and joined under the title Medway-Sydenham Hall.

== Building layout ==
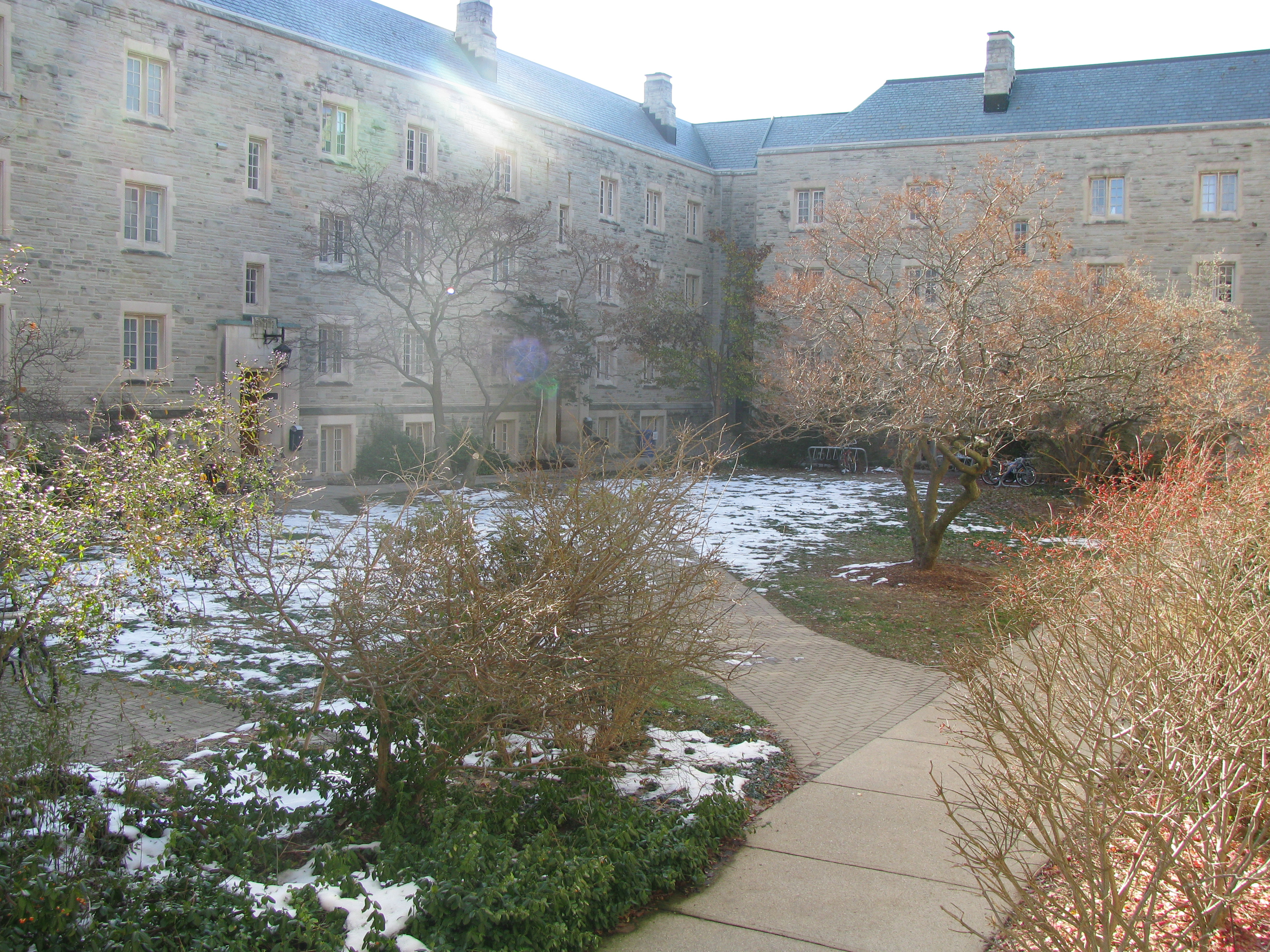
The Medway Quad viewed from the main Medway gates.

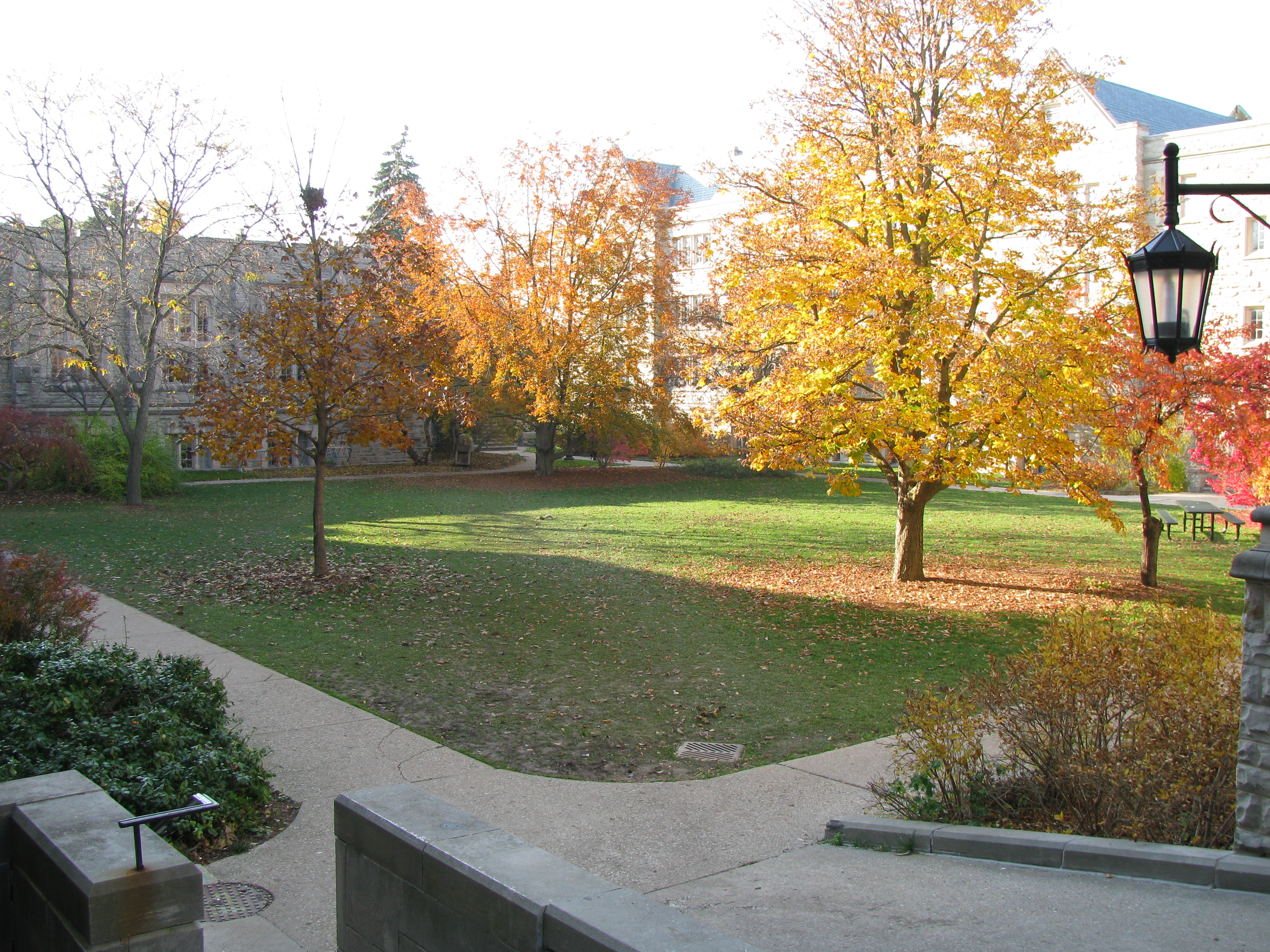
The Sydenham Quad viewed from the Spencely door.

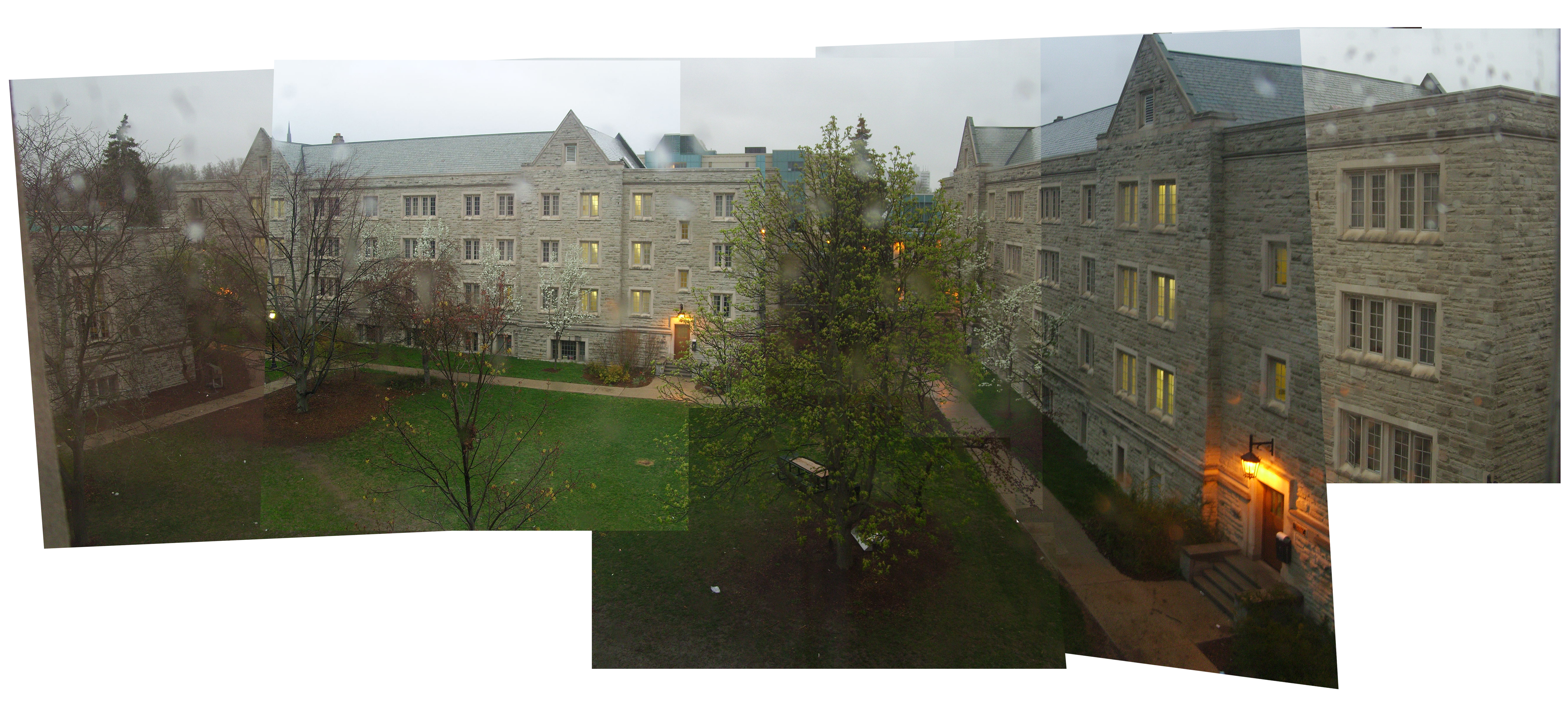
View from the ST side of the Sydenham Quad.

Medway-Sydenham consists of two separate residences that are connected through a tunnel. Both Medway and Sydenham are three stories high and contains only stairs and no elevators.

=== Medway ===
Medway contains a total of nine floors, all 3 floors per three units. The fourth unit in Medway is made up of the Thomas L. Hoskin Library (also known as the Medlib), the Formal Lounge (also known as the Flounj) and the Green Room (formerly the Medway Lounge). The four units are positioned in a rectangular shape, forming a Quad in the center.
* Unit: WPM --- Floors: Murphy, Peache, Wilson
* Unit: MGM --- Floors: Gibbons, McKibben, Meredith
* Unit: BED --- Floors: Beattie, Drury, Eccles

The word floor is more associated with the names than with actually landings of a building. The floors of the third floor (Eccles, Meredith and Wilson) are connected by the hallway as are the floors of the second floor (Drury, McKibben and Peache). Although they are connected by the hallway, they are considered to be of distinct groups. In the past, they were separated by doors that were kept closed and locked.

=== Sydenham ===
The Sydenham building design is very similar to Medway's. It has a total of 9 floors within 3 units. The fourth section in Sydenham consists of the Cafeteria and the Sydenham Lounge. Unlike Medway, Sydenham's 3 units are named as a whole. Similar to the first floor of Medway, none of the units floors are connected directly to each other. They are only connected by the tunnel system.
* Unit: Spencely Tamblyn (ST) --- Floors: ST-1, ST-2, ST-3
* Unit: James Neville (JN) --- Floors: JN-1, JN-2, JN-3
* Unit: Crane Ingram (CI) --- Floors: CI-1, CI-2, CI-3

== Vixens ==
The Medway Sydenham Hall Vixens are an all-female flag football team made up of the female residents of Medway Sydenham Hall, along with several student coaches. The Vixens compete in three campus wide tournaments annually: Brescia Bowl, UDR tournament and Champions Cup. The Vixens won these tournaments in the 03/04, 04/05, 06/07, 07/08, and 09/10 seasons. In 08/09, The Vixens won the Brescia Bowl and lost in the finals in the Champions Cup. The Vixens continued the dynasty, by capturing both the Brescia Bowl & Champions Cup again in 09/10. Recently, the Vixens regained title status as winners of the 2017/2018 Champions Cup. As of the 17/18 season, the Vixens have won Brescia Bowl eighteen years in a row.

The Medway Sydenham Hall Vixens are consistently known as the largest team in the tournament—often bringing over 100 girls to compete.

== Sophs ==
Every year the soph team is selected through an interview process. Medway Sydenham regularly has the most applications per capita compared to all other UWO residences.

The team consists of a total of 22 Sophs, one being the Head Soph, and between 1-3 others being Programming Assistants (PA), to form the Head Team. There is generally 1 soph per floor, but is dependent on team size. One exception is that Gibbons, contains 2 sophs.

"FIRE IT UP!" is a mantra commonly heard among Med-Syd sophs and residents.

== Staff ==
The staff team consists of 19 people. Each unit has 3 staff members, one don on each floor. Due to its size Gibbons has 2 dons.

Members of the staff team that are not Dons include the residence manager, the Residence Education Advisors (REA) and the Assistant Program Coordinator (APC). The residence manager has a suite style room in Medway.

== Residents' Council ==
The Medway Sydenham Hall Residents' Council is the governing student organization of Medway Sydenham Hall.

Medway and Sydenham Halls both had their own independent Residents' Councils formed in 1958 and 1961 respectively. When the buildings joined in 1997, so did their Councils to form the Medway and Sydenham Hall Residents' Council. This name was officially changed to the Medway Sydenham Hall Residents' Council in 2004.

The current Medway Sydenham Hall Residents' Council is made up of 3 branches:

1. The Executive Branch is made up of the elected President, Vice President Social, Vice President Finance, Vice President Communications, Vice President Programming and Super HOC
2. The Upper House is made up of the Executive Branch as well as appointed Committee Heads (Academic, Athletic, Cultural and Environmental, Human Issues, Newsletter, Philanthropy, Promotions, Social, Yearbook and Head Soph).
3. The Lower House (or full Council) is made up of the Upper House as well as 1 Floor Representative from each floor, 1 Residence Life Staff Liaison, 1 Faculty Representative from all Faculty Councils that request one, 1 Academic Programs Coordinator(APC) and the Residence Manager.
