= Ignatius Ajuru University of Education =

University in Port Harcourt, Nigeria

- Established: November 20, 2009
- Location: Rumuolumeni, Port Harcourt, Rivers State, Nigeria
- Website: www.iauoe.edu.ng

Ignatius Ajuru University of Education, (IAUE) is a Nigerian university.

== History ==
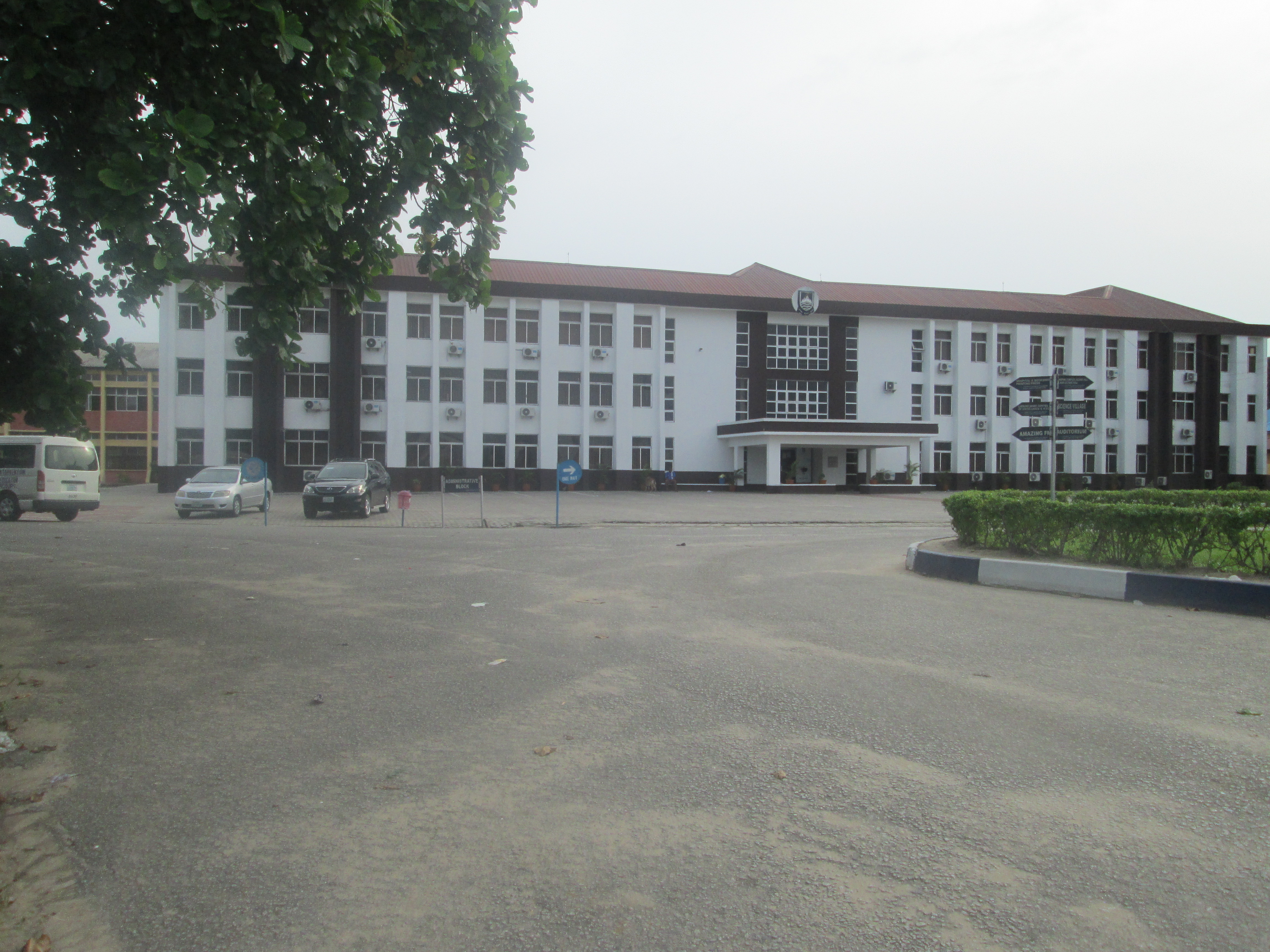
Administrative Building

Ignatius Ajuru University of Education, (IAUE) was previously known as Rivers State College of Education from June 1971- October 2009.

Rivers State College of Education was created as an autonomous body With the College reaching an attainment of full maturity, as it became well placed to play a more dynamic role to the society. The sole purpose of establishing the college with a Governing Council which is responsible for the recruitment of staff and for the general and overall administrative and financial control of the institution. Following the transformation, Mr. E. Aguma, who was appointed Principal in January 1975, became the first Provost of the College while Dr. E.T. Green succeeded Mr. Alagoa as the Chairman of Council in June 1975. After an interregnum was created by the change of Government in the country in July 1975, a new Governing Council with Dr. F.A. Eke, as Chairman, and a new Provost, Mr. R.I.C. Koko, were appointed in November of the same year.

The first provost of the then college was Mr. E. Aguma in 1975 after the college was conferred as an autonomous body following successive transformations in the college at the time.

The college moved to its permanent site at Rumuolumeni in January,1977 although some essential facilities were still lacking on the campus. This bold step was a definite milestone in the life of the institution, because physical presence on the spot has placed it in a better position to make further plans for its continued growth and improvement of existing facilities. A unique event in the history of the College occurred on 11th March 1978 on the occasion of its official opening and first graduation ceremony of 462 students, who received their diplomas on the successful completion of the Nigeria Certificate in Education (NCE) programme, consisting of four sets who passed their diploma exams between 1974 and 1977. On May 28, 1982, the College matriculated the pioneer students of the degree programme. By the end of the 1983/1984 academic session, a total of 3,169 students had successfully passed through the various programmes of the College. Out of the total figure, 2,504 students went through the NCE Programme, 531 students passed through the ACE programme and 134 students in the B. Ed. programme. It is of worthy to note that, out of all the Colleges of Education affiliated to the University of Ibadan, Rivers State College of Education was the only one offering the Bachelor of Education degree programme.

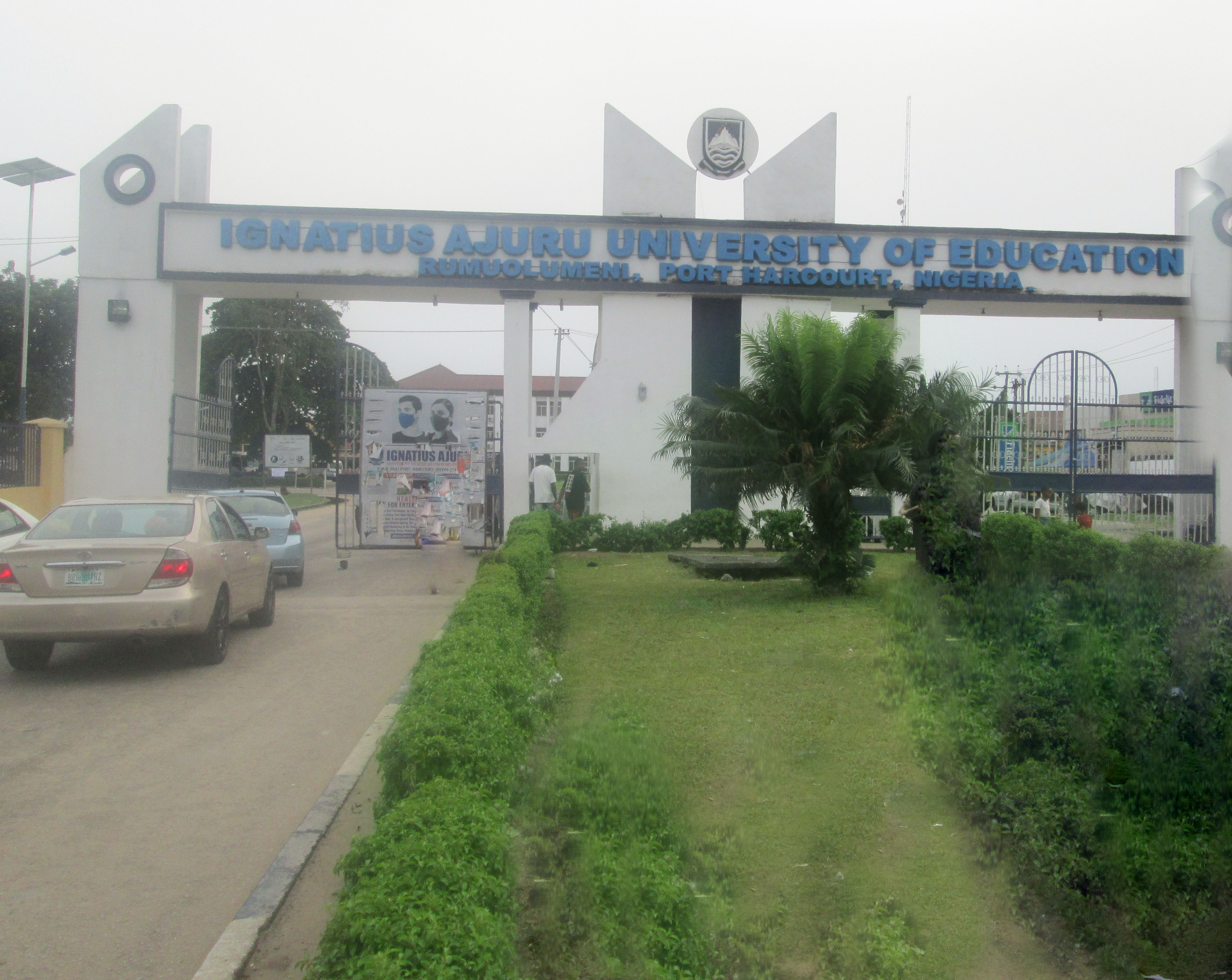
Main Gate

By 1980, the Government declared her intention to initiate degree programmes in educational fields through Colleges of Education and the Rivers State Government decided to sponsor the programme in order to increase the number of teachers in the State. Prof. G.O.M. Tasie was appointed Provost of the College and was taxed with the duty of upgrading the college to a degree-awarding institution. The 1981/82 academic year witnessed the actual admission of candidates for degree programmes in Rivers State College of Education after his appointment. Note that, of all the Colleges of Education affiliated to the University of Ibadan, Rivers State College of Education was the only one offering the Bachelor of Education degree programme. The Rivers State Government decided to convert Rivers State College of Education to a University in 2009 to further provide opportunities for high quality education for Nigerians especially indigenes of the State. Given that the college had for a long time been awarding degrees in affiliation with the University of Ibadan, the transition from a college of education to a university should be easy for the institution. In addition, many graduates of the extinct Rivers State College of Education yearned to improve their academic qualifications through the acquisition of university degrees, preferably within the environment they were acclimatized to. Ignatius Ajuru University of Education was established by the University of Education Law No. 8 of 2009 of the Rivers State Government passed by the Rivers State House of Assembly on 15 October 2009 and was approved by His Excellency, Chief Rotimi Amaechi, the then Executive Governor of Rivers State on 20 October 2009. IAUE became the second state-owned University. The current Vice-Chancellor of IAUE is Prof. Okey Onuchukwu

His appointment as the 3rd substantive vice Chancellor of the University was confirmed at the end of his tenure by the Governing council of the university in November 2026 and dated back to November 17th, 2021, when he was appointed as acting Vice Chancellor with approval from the visitor of the university, Sir Siminalayi Fubara, the Rivers State Governor.

After the confirmation, he handed over to Professor Alafuro Epelle who will then act as the Vice Chancellor for the University.

== Programmes ==
Ignatius Ajuru University of Education offer the following programmes:

- Basic Studies
- Post Graduate School
- College of Continuing Education

== Faculties ==
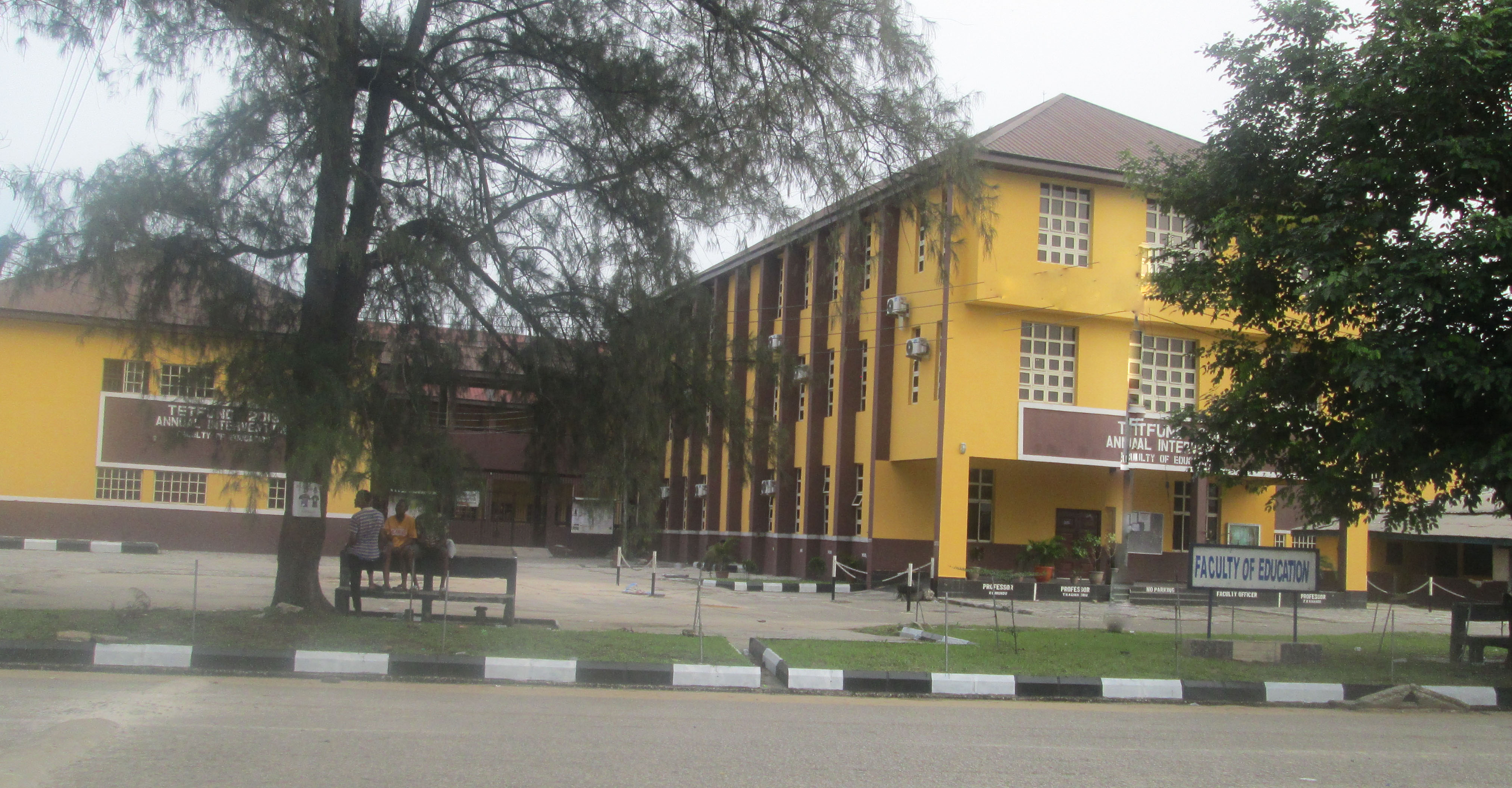
Faculty of Education

There are currently six faculties of study in the University.

- Faculty of Humanities
- Faculty of Social Sciences
- Faculty of Education
- Faculty of Business Studies (Management Sciences)
- Faculty of Natural and Applied Sciences
- Faculty of Vocational and Technical Education

== Departments ==
FACULTY OF BUSINESS STUDIES (MANAGEMENT SCIENCES)

Department of Accounting (PGD, MSc, Mphil/PhD and PhD)

- Financial Accounting
- Public Finance
- Taxation

Department of Management (PGD, MSc, Mphil/PhD and PhD)

- Entrepreneurship Studies
- Human Resource Management
- Industrial Relations
- Organizational Behaviour
- Production Management

Department of Marketing (PGD, MSc, Mphil/PhD and PhD)

- Marketing

Department of Office and Information Management (PGD, MSc, Mphil/PhD and PhD)

- Office and Information Management

FACULTY OF EDUCATION

Department of Curriculum Studies and Instructional Technology (MEd, Mphil/PhD and PhD)

- Adult Education
- Curriculum Studies
- Educational Technology
- Language Education
- Library and Information Science (BLS, PGDL, MLS MPHIL/PhD and PhD)
- Science Education

Department of Educational Foundations (MEd, Mphil/PhD and PhD)

- History and Policy of Education
- Philosophy of Education
- Sociology of Education

Department of Educational Management (MEd, Mphil/PhD and PhD)

- Administration of Higher Education
- Economics of Education
- Educational Administration
- Educational Leadership and Policy
- Educational Planning

Department of Primary Education Studies (MEd, Mphil/PhD and PhD)

- Early Childhood Education
- Primary Education

Department of Educational Psychology, Guidance and Counselling (MEd, Mphil/PhD and PhD)

- Educational Psychology
- Guidance and Counselling
- Measurement and Evaluation
- Special Education
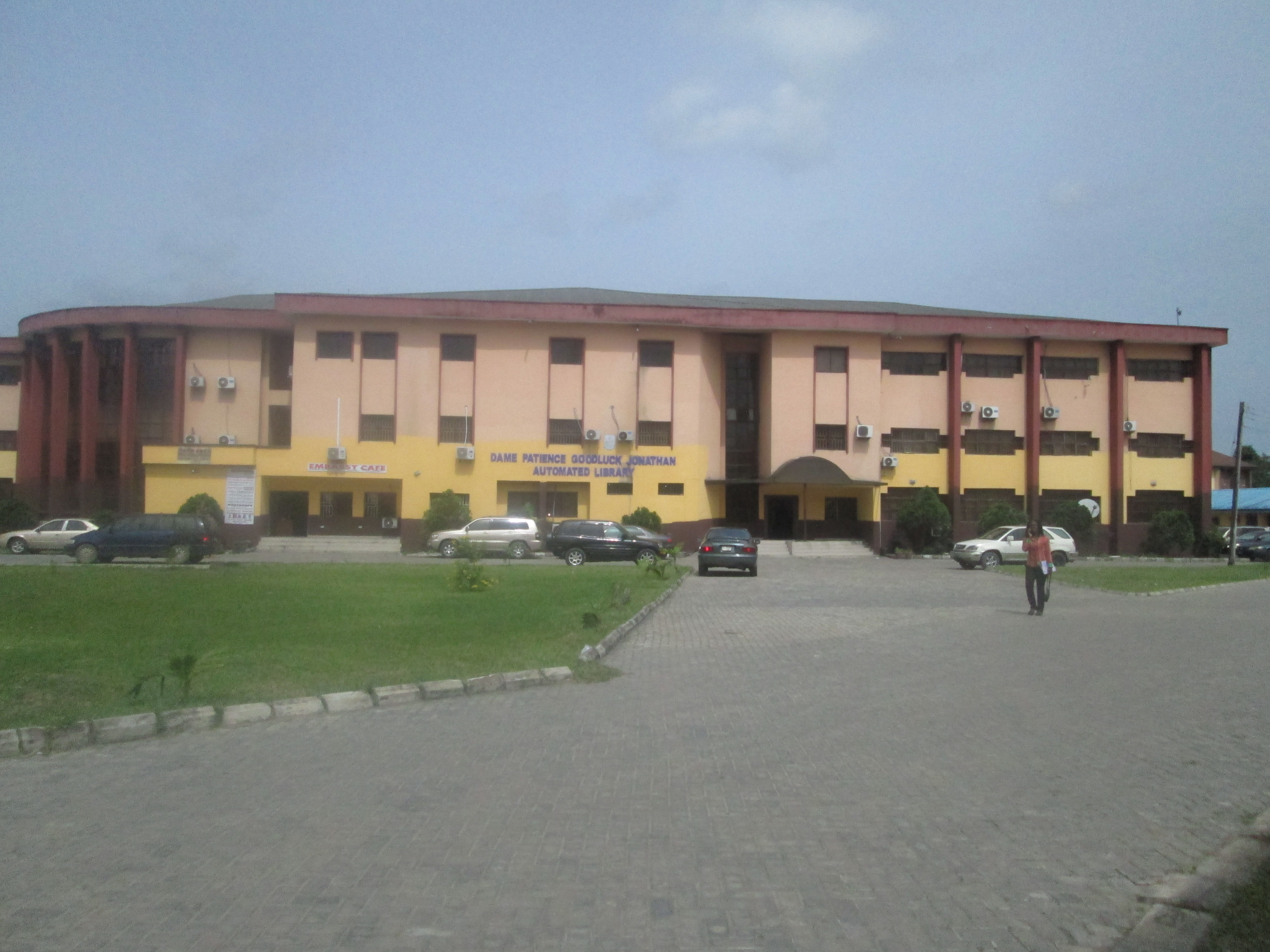
  Dame Patience Goodluck Jonathan Automated Library

Department of Library and Information Science (PGDL, MLS, Mphil/PhD and PhD)

- Library and Information Science

FACULTY OF HUMANITIES

Department of English and Communication Art (PGD, MA, Mphil/PhD and PhD)

- Communication
- Language
- Literature

Department of Fine and Applied Arts (PGD, MA, Mphil/PhD and PhD)

- Art Education
- Art History
- Ceramics and Textile Design
- Graphic Design and Art Education
- Metal Design
- Painting
- Sculpture

Department of French and International Studies (PGD, MA, Mphil/PhD and PhD)

- African Literature
- French Language/Linguistics
- French Literature
- Translation Studies

Department of Religious and Cultural Studies (PGD, MA, Mphil/PhD and PhD)

- African Traditional Religion
- Biblical Studies
- Church History
- Comparative Religion
- Sociology of Religion

Department of History and Diplomatic Studies (PGD, MA, Mphil/PhD and PhD)

- African History
- Diplomacy and International Relations
- History and International Relations
- Political and Social History

Department of Music (PGD, MA, Mphil/PhD and PhD)

- African Music
- Conducting and Music Directing
- Music Performance
- Theory and Composition

FACULTY OF NATURAL AND APPLIED SCIENCES

Department of Biology (PGD, MSc, Mphil/PhD and PhD)

- Entomology and Pest Management
- Environmental Biology
- Environmental Parasitology
- Food and Industrial Microbiology
- Hydrobiology and Fisheries
- Plant Ecology
- Plant Physiology

Department of Chemistry (PGD, MSc, Mphil/PhD and PhD)

- Analytical Chemistry
- Environmental Chemistry

Department of Computer Science (PGD, MSc, Mphil/PhD and PhD)

- Computer Science
- Information Technology

Department of Human Kinetics, Health and Safety Studies (PGD, MSc, Mphil/PhD and PhD)

- Community Health
- Exercise Physiology
- Occupational Health and Safety
- Rehabilitation Therapy
- Reproductive Health
- Sports Administration and Marketing
- Sports Management
- Sports Medicine
- Sociology of Sports

Department of Integrated Science (PGD, MSc, Mphil/PhD and PhD)

- Basic and Environmental Science
- Basic Interpretations

Department of Mathematics and Statistics (PGD, MSc, Mphil/PhD and PhD)

- Mathematics
- Statistics

Department of Physics (PGD, MSc, Mphil/PhD and PhD)

- Applied Geophysics
- Environmental and Radiation Physics
- Solid State Physics/Electronics
- Theoretical Physics

FACULTY OF SOCIAL SCIENCES

Department of Economics (PGD, MSc, Mphil/PhD and PhD)

- Developmental Economics/Planning
- Environmental Economics
- International Economics
- Monetary Economics

Department of Geography and Environmental Studies (PGD, MSc, Mphil/PhD and PhD)

- Environmental Management
- Geomorphology
- Regional Development Planning
- Rural Development and Resource Management

Department of Sociology (PGD, MSc, Mphil/PhD and PhD)

- Criminology and Security Studies
- Industrial Relations and Human Resource Management
- Peace and Conflict Studies
- Sociology of Development
- Social Works and Social Welfare Administration

Department of Political Science (PGD, MSc, Mphil/PhD and PhD)

- Developmental Studies
- International Relations
- Local Government Administration
- Politics and Governance
- Political Theory
- Public Administration

FACULTY OF VOCATIONAL AND TECHNICAL EDUCATION (PGD, MSc, MSc.Ed, Mphil/PhD and PhD)

Department of Agriculture

- Agricultural Economics
- Agricultural Education
- Agricultural Extension
- Agronomy
- Animal Production
- Crop Science
- Fisheries and Aquaculture
- Soil Science

Department of Home Economics and Hospitality Management (PGD, MSc, MSc.Ed Mphil/PhD and PhD)

- Clothing and Textile
- Food and Nutrition
- Home Management
- Human and Family Development

Department of Industrial Technical Education (PGD, MSc, MSc.Ed, Mphil/PhD and PhD)

- Automobile Technology
- Building Technology
- Electrical/Electronics Technology
- Mechanical Technology

== Gallery ==
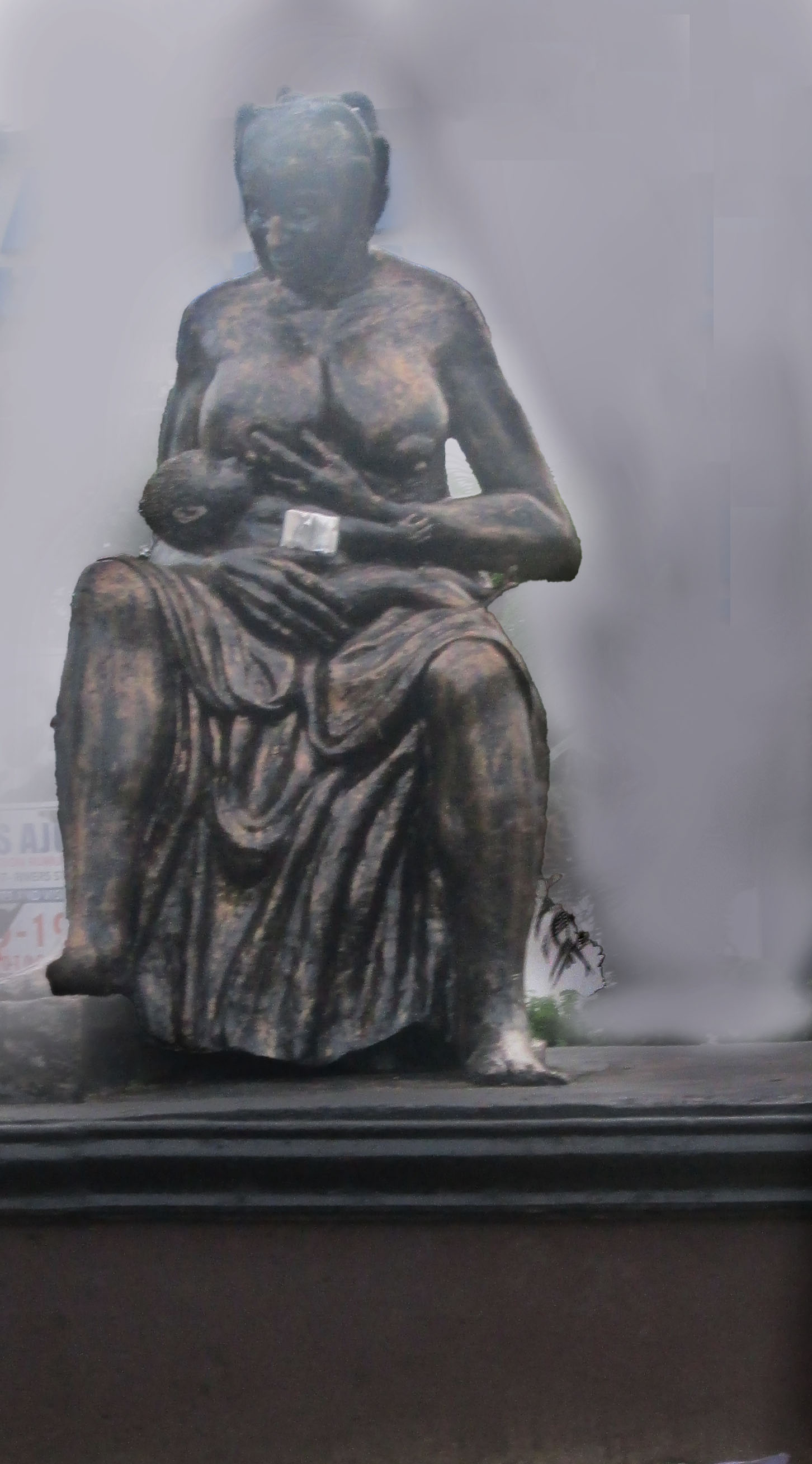
The statue of a mother breast-feeding a child

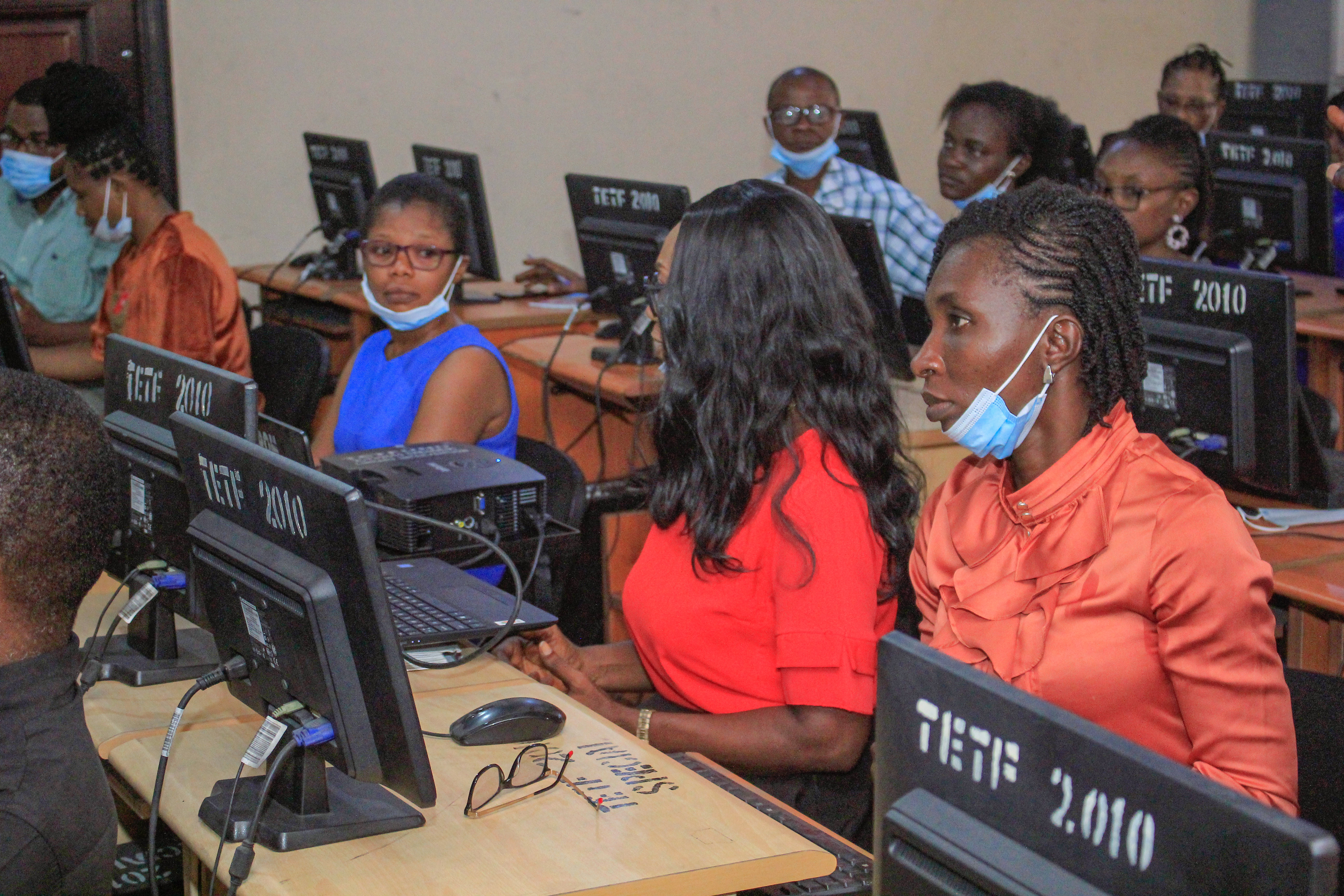
Wikipedia Training Session, IAUOE

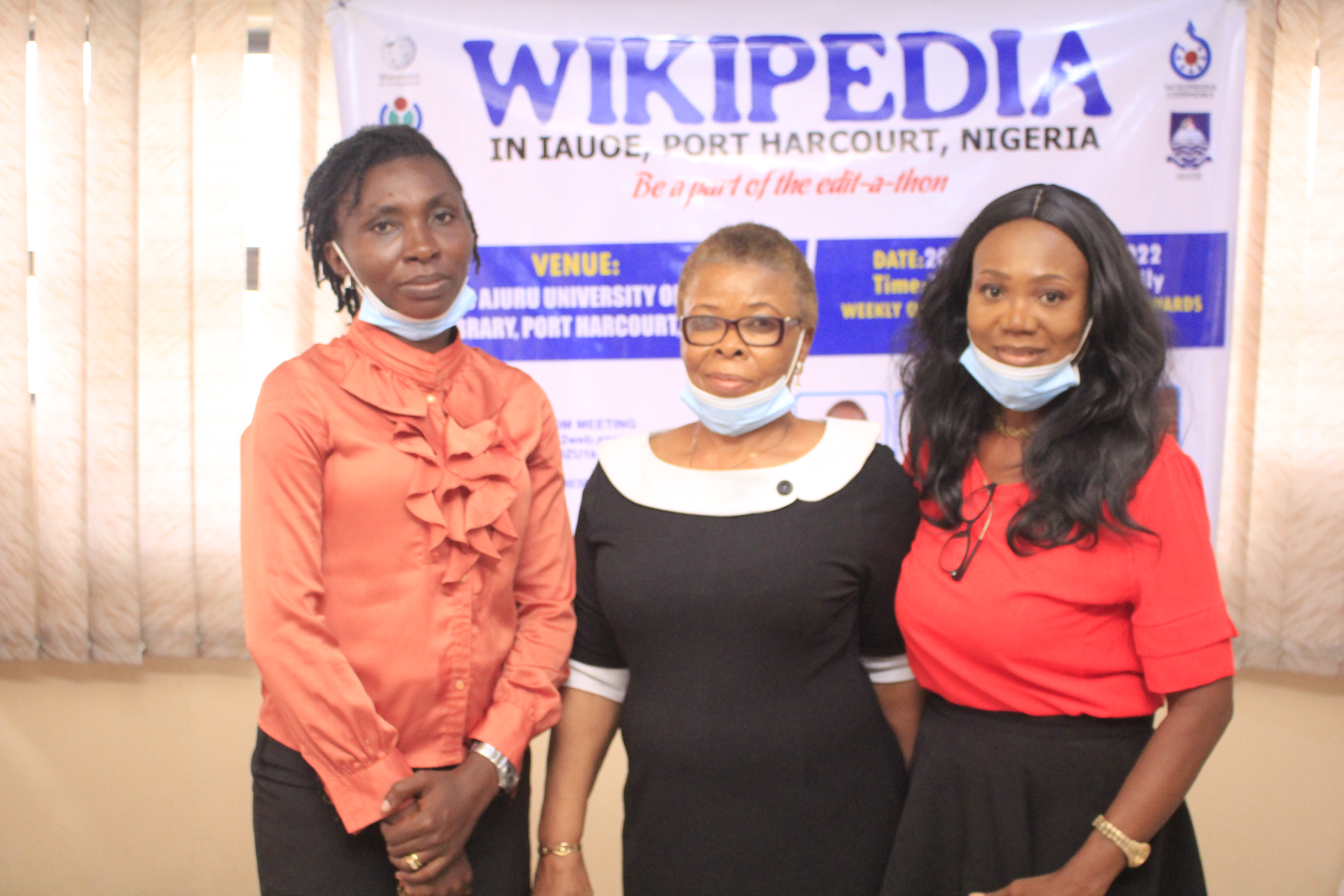

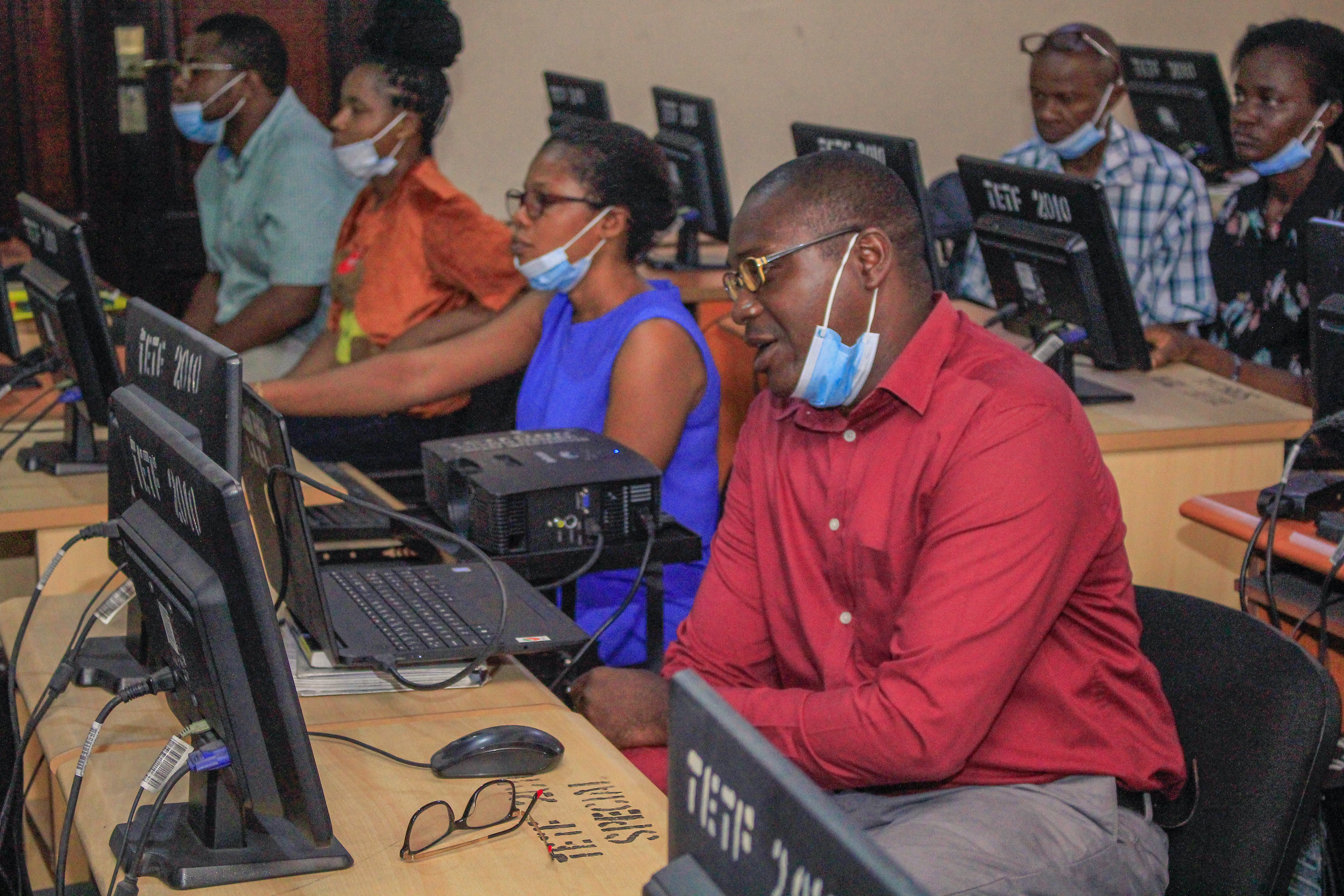

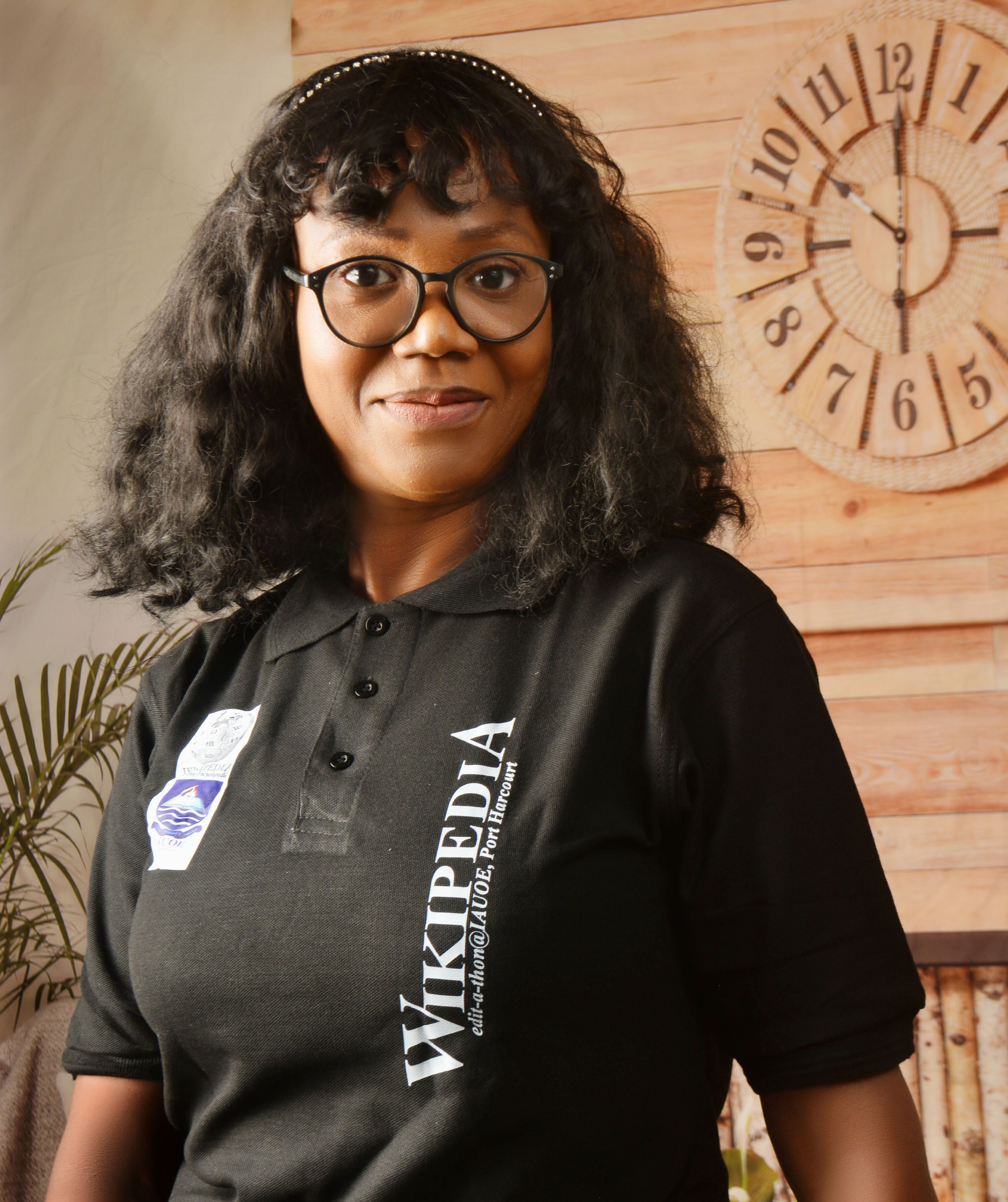
Wikipedia T-shirt for IAUOE

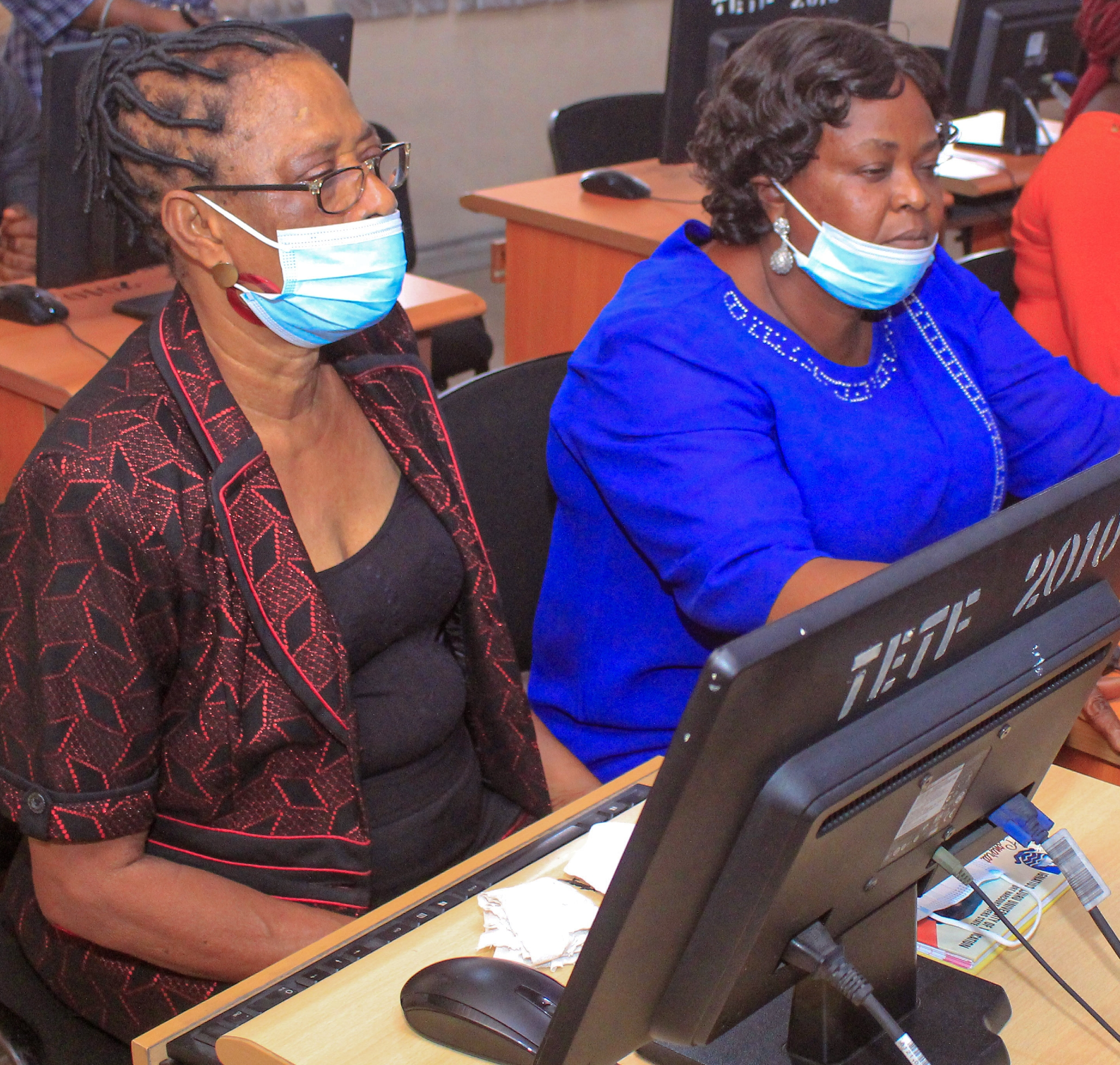

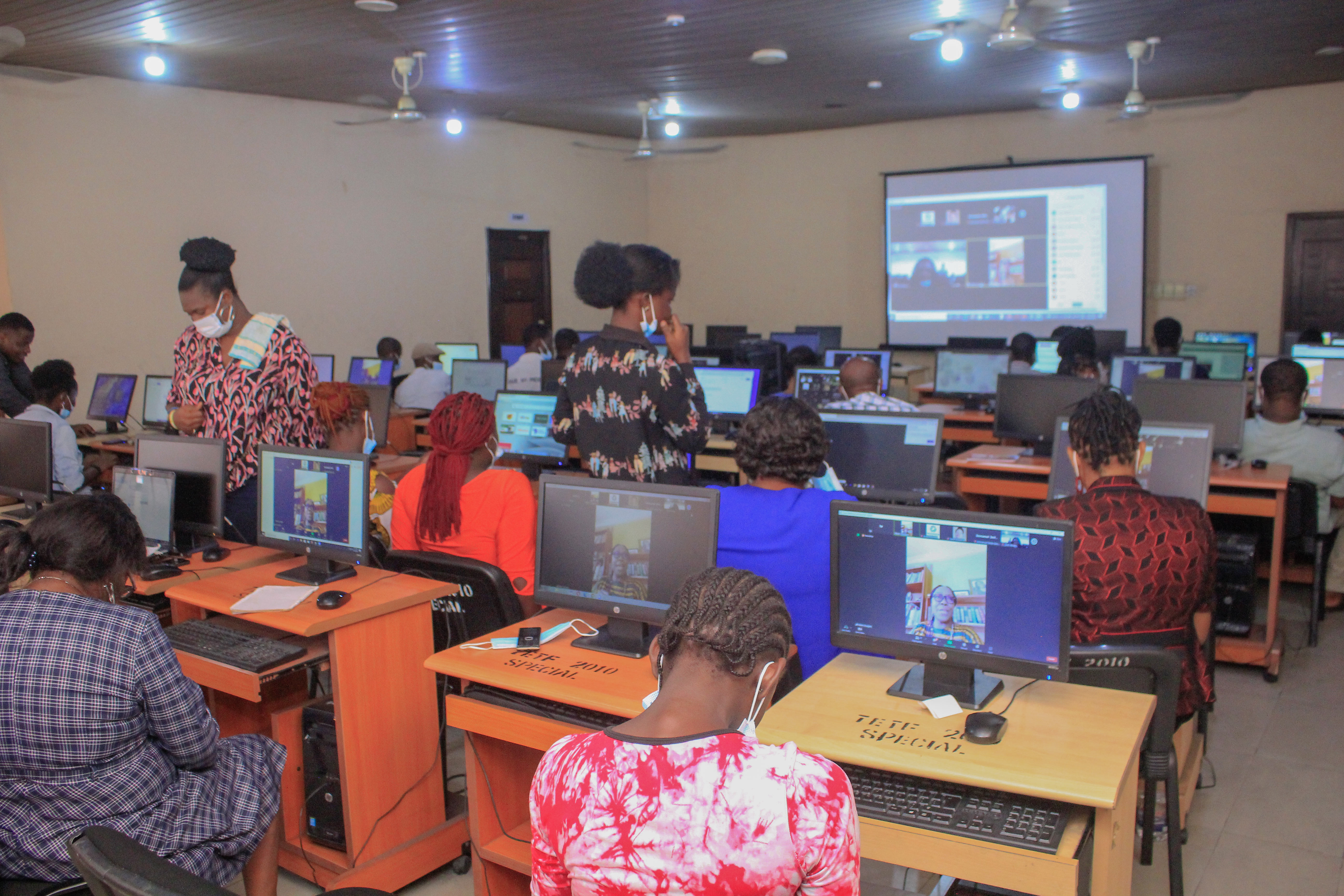

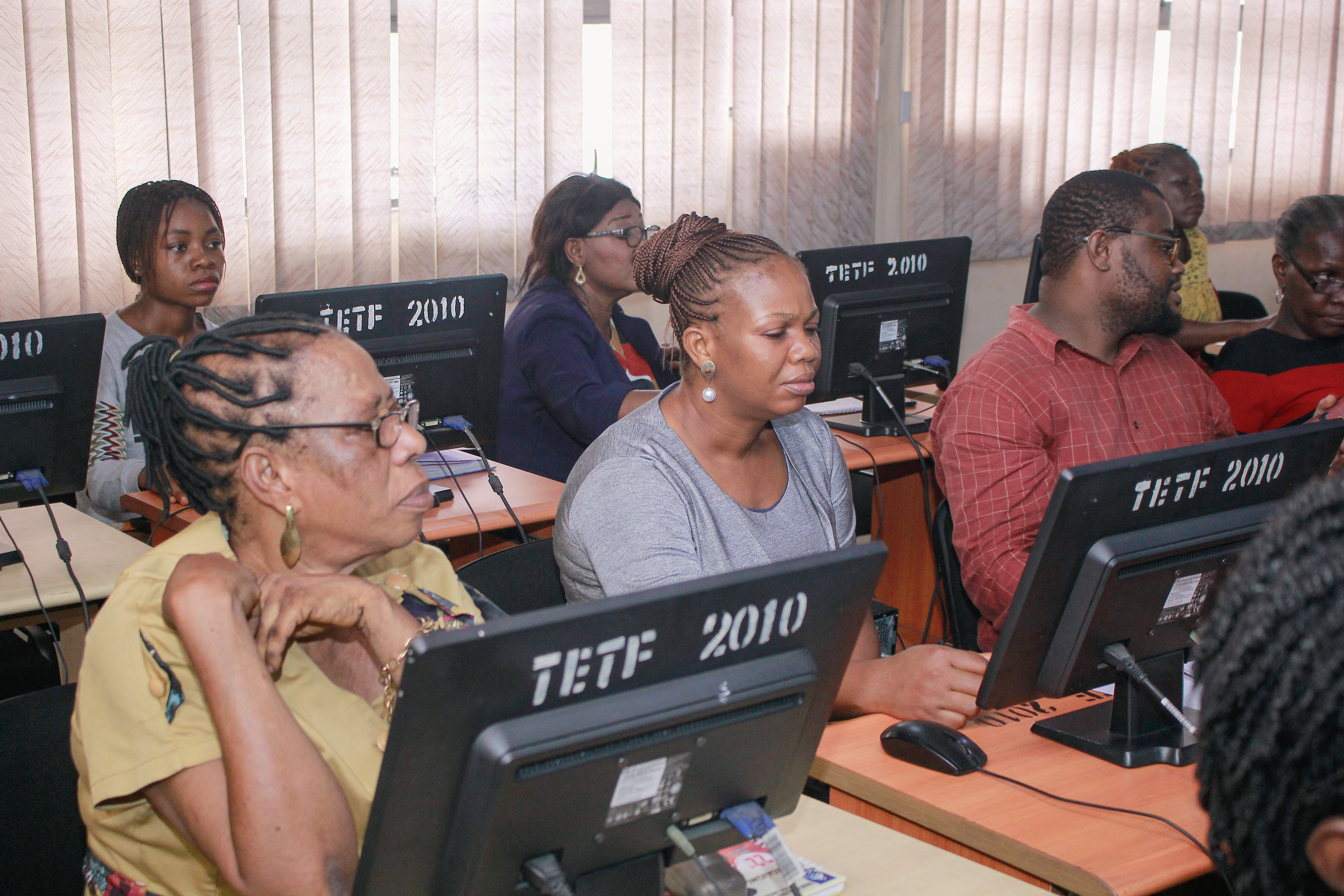

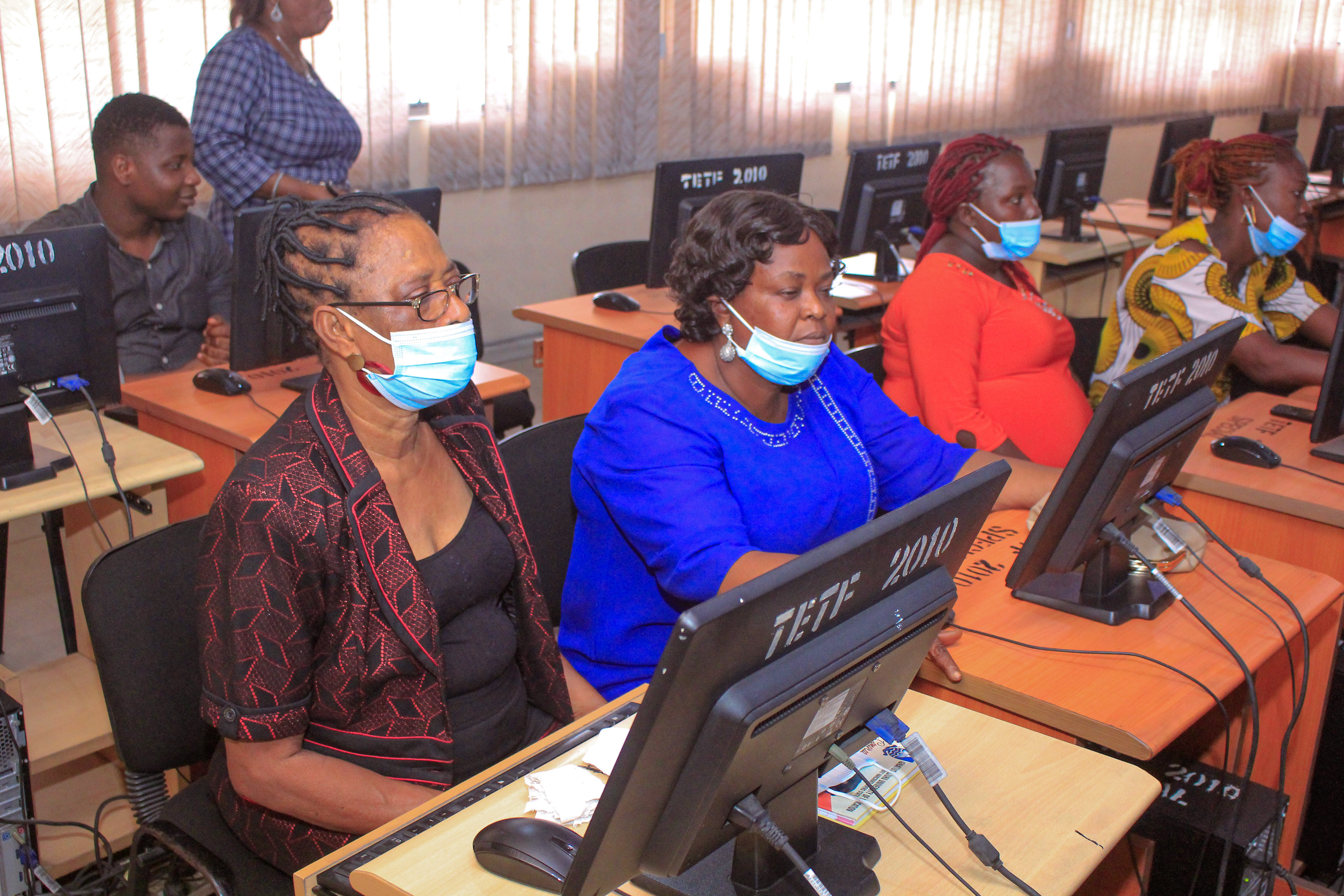

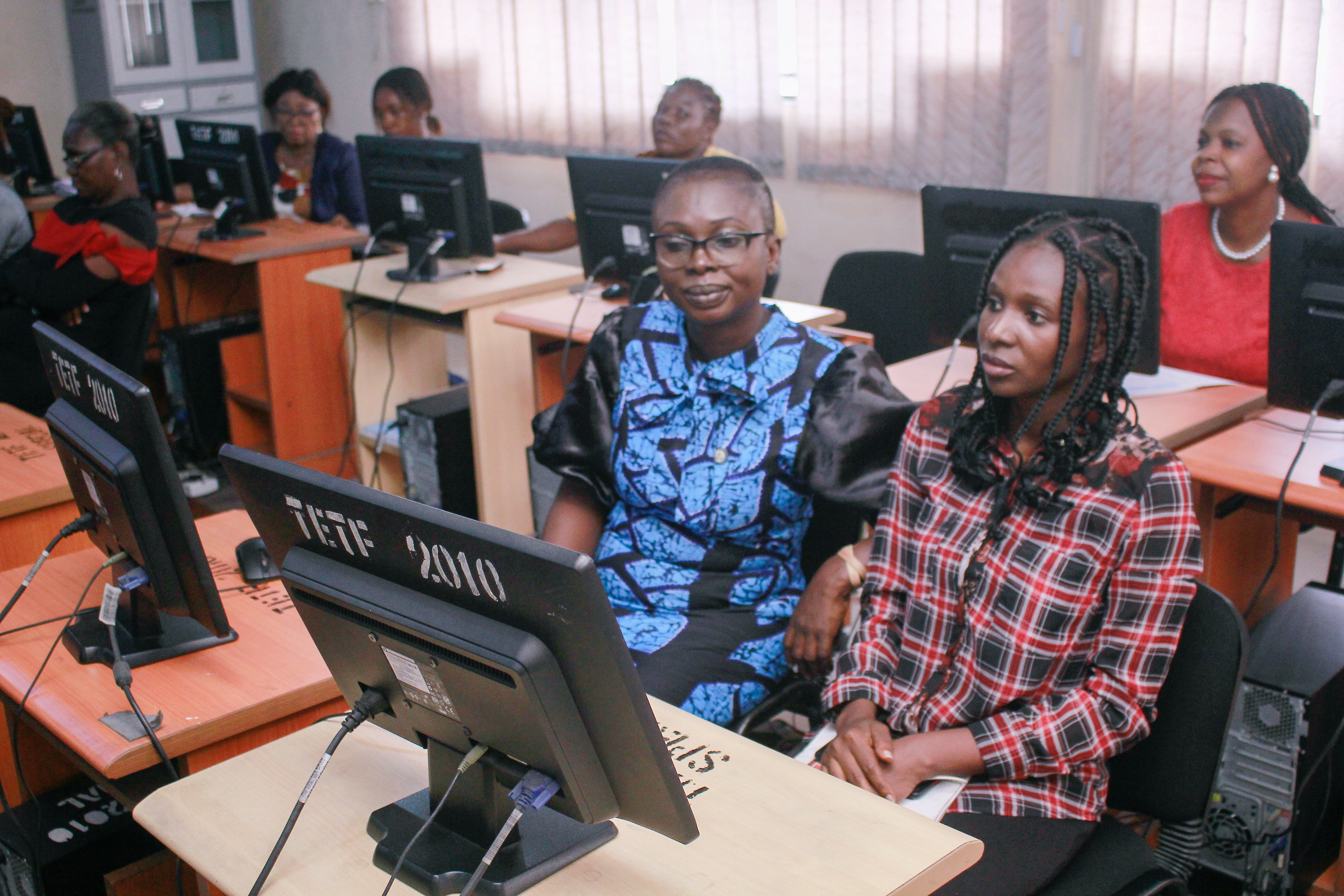

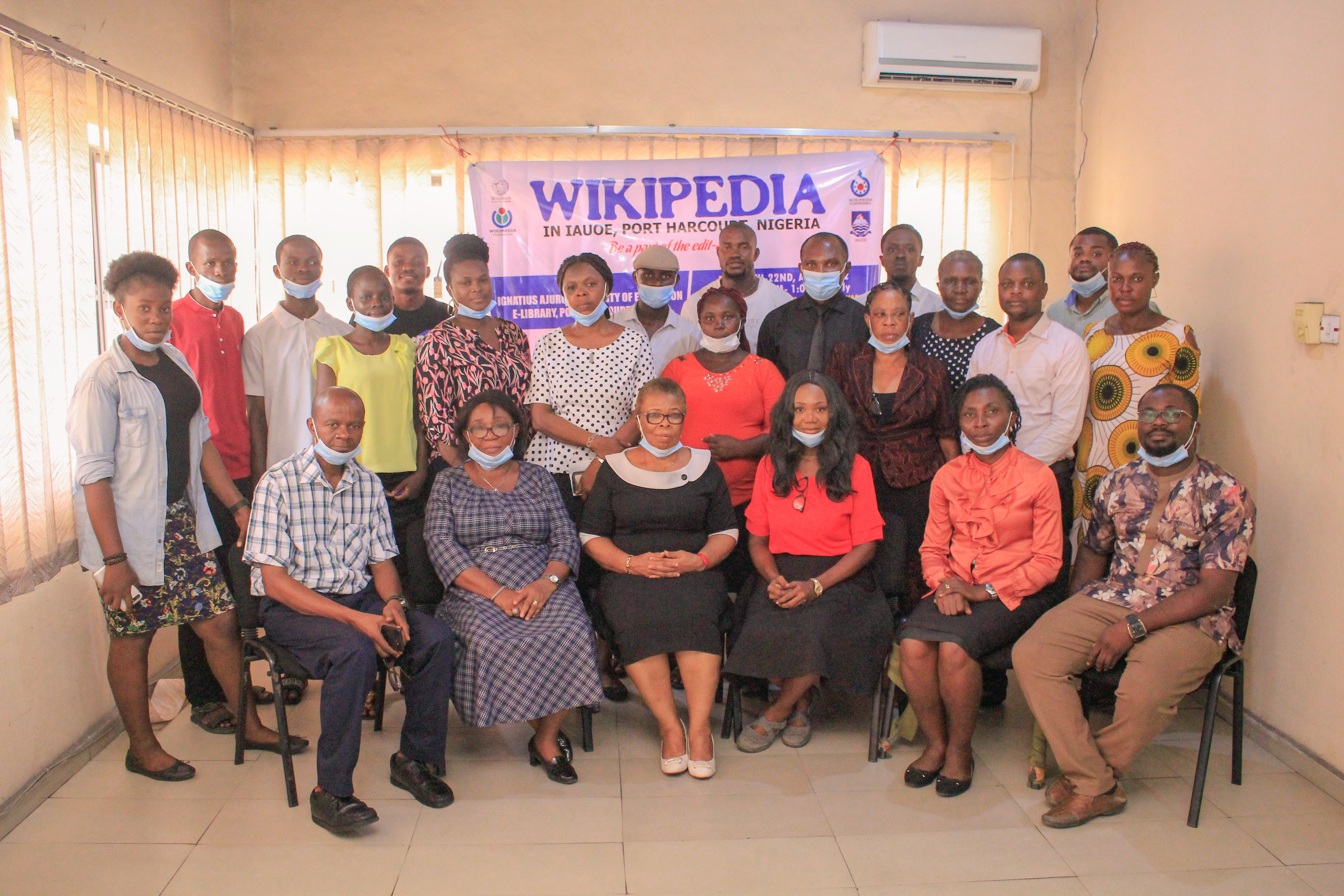

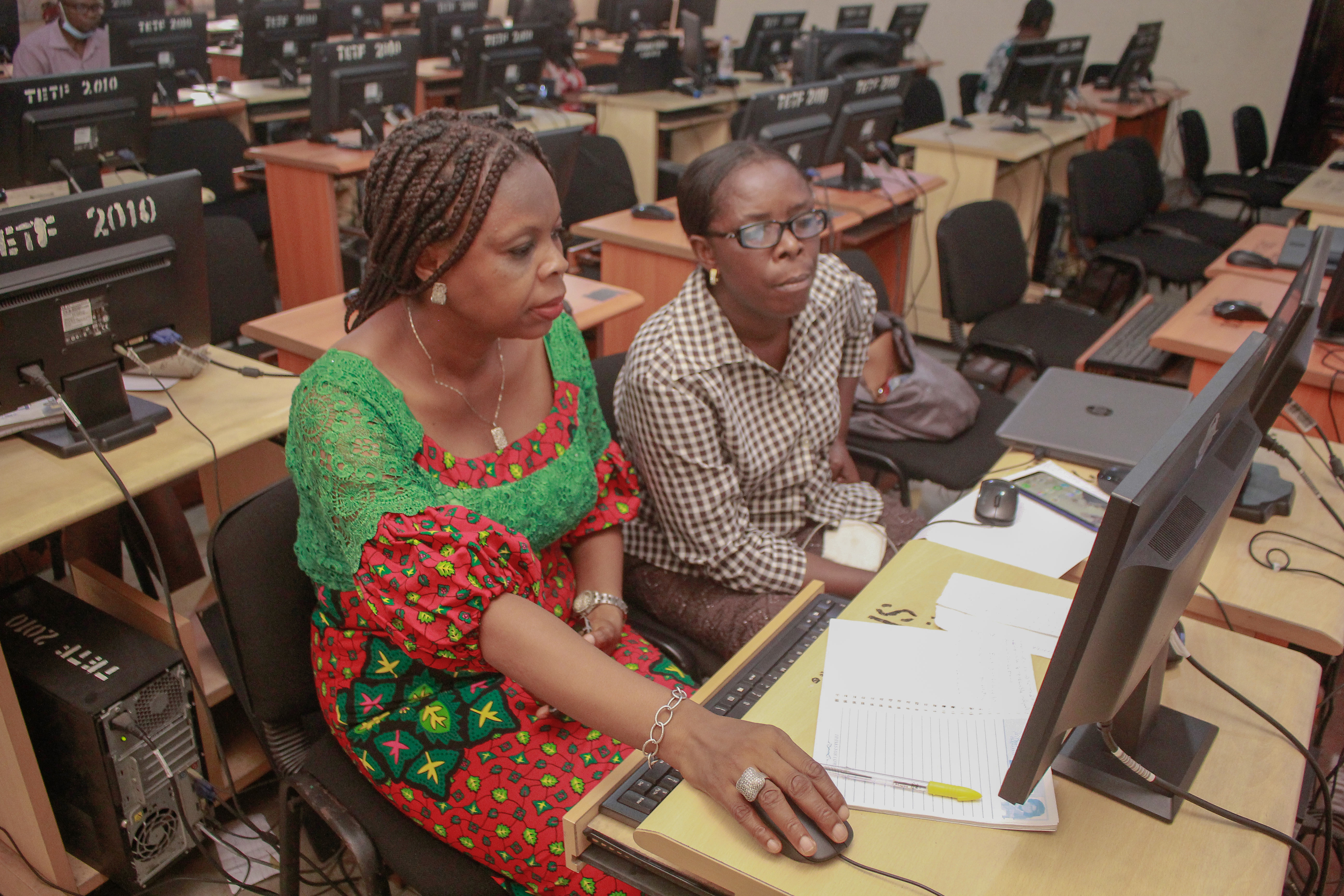
