= University of Western Ontario Faculty of Information and Media Studies =

- Established: 1996
- Parent institution: University of Western Ontario
- Dean: Susan Knabe (Acting)
- Location: London, Ontario
- Website: www.fims.uwo.ca

The Faculty of Information and Media Studies (FIMS) is a faculty at the University of Western Ontario, located in London, Ontario, Canada. The faculty offers programs at the undergraduate and graduate levels, focusing on the advancement of knowledge in media, communications, and information technologies.

== History ==
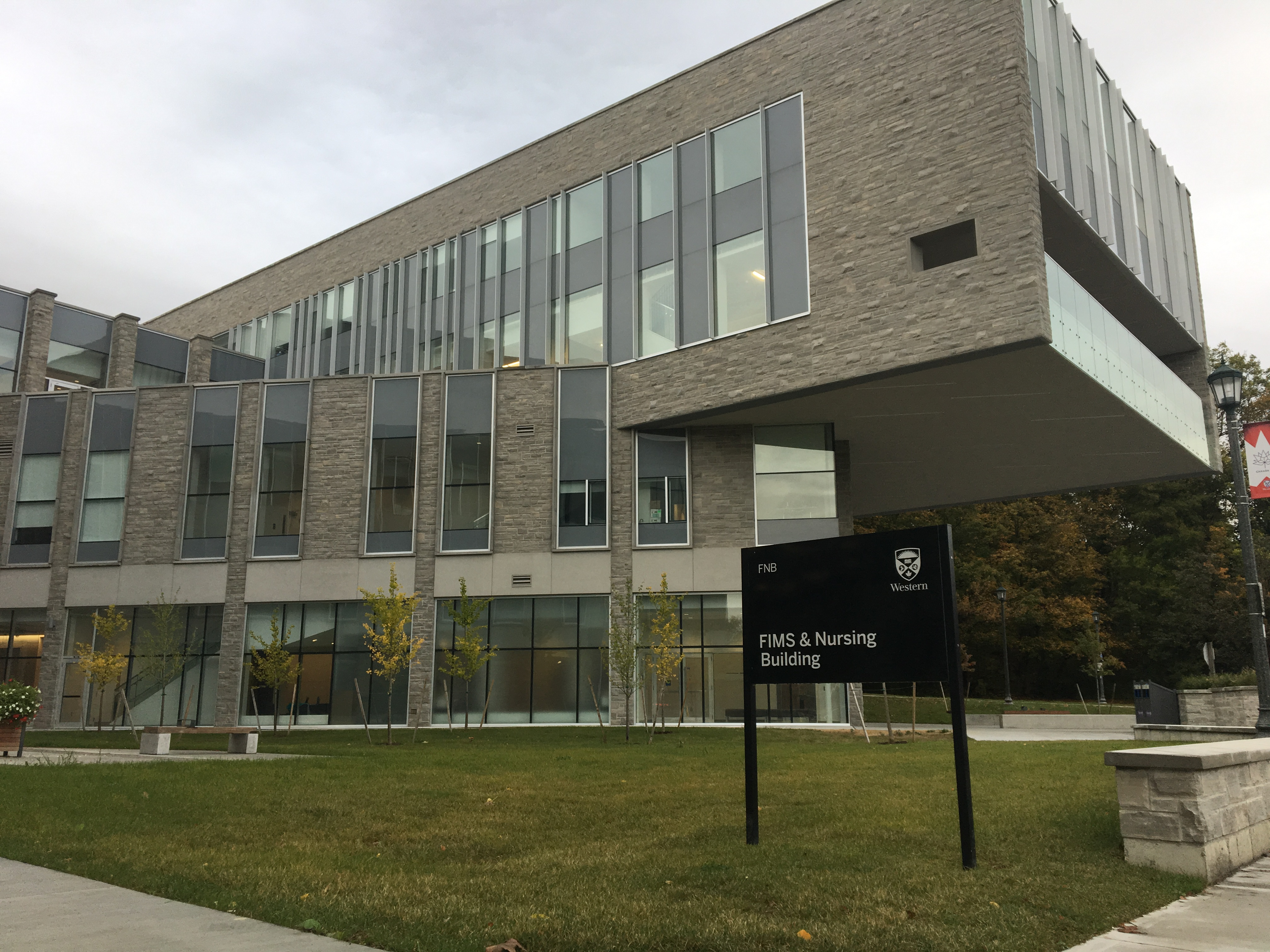
FIMS & Nursing Building, 2017

FIMS was born from a merger between the MA in Journalism program and the Master in Library and information Science (MLIS) program. The MLIS program was established in 1966 with the School of Library and Information Science (SLIS), intended to help address a shortage of professionally trained librarians in Canada.

When Western's SLIS was established, it was housed in a temporary prefabricated structure located on an unpaved parking lot behind the football stadium. The doors opened for students in 1967, making 2017 the 50 year anniversary for a graduate library and information science program at Western. After 15 years in the temporary building, the SLIS was moved to Elborn College, formerly the Teachers College.

The 1980s and 1990s saw a shift in the SLIS program to an increased emphasis on the information aspect of the program. This reflected changes to the profession driven by computers and communication technology. After 1985, rather than a Master of Library Science (MLS), graduates from SLIS received a Master of Library and Information Science (MLIS).

In 1995, Dr. Jean Tague-Sutcliffe proposed merging the MA in Journalism program with the Master in Library and Information Science program in response to American trends of mergers and closures amongst library schools, in combination with the threat of closure facing Western University's MA in Journalism program. The merger of the two programs was carried out in 1996 by a 10-person Joint Transition Committee with Catherine Ross as acting dean.

In 1997, FIMS created their first undergraduate program, a BA in Media, Information, and Technoculture (MIT) which focused on media and information studies. In the same year, Western's Graduate School of Journalism, Graduate School of Library and Information Science, and Faculty of Part-Time and Continuing Education merged to form the Faculty of Communication and Open Learning. In 1998, the Faculty of Communication and Open Learning was renamed the Faculty of Information and Media Studies (FIMS). Following the merger and renaming, FIMS relocated to Middlesex College, which had been the home of the Journalism School.

In 2002, FIMS launched two new programs: the Master of Arts in Media Studies, and the Media Theory and Production Program, offered in conjunction with Fanshawe College. Two years later, FIMS introduced the Media and Public Interest Program, which combined elements of media studies with social justice studies.

With the steady expansion of the faculty, and undergraduate enrolment surpassing 700 students, FIMS moved from Middlesex College into the North Campus Building for more up to date facilities in 2006. The move was followed by the launch of the Masters of Arts in Popular Music and Culture in 2007, expanding the Media Studies offerings.

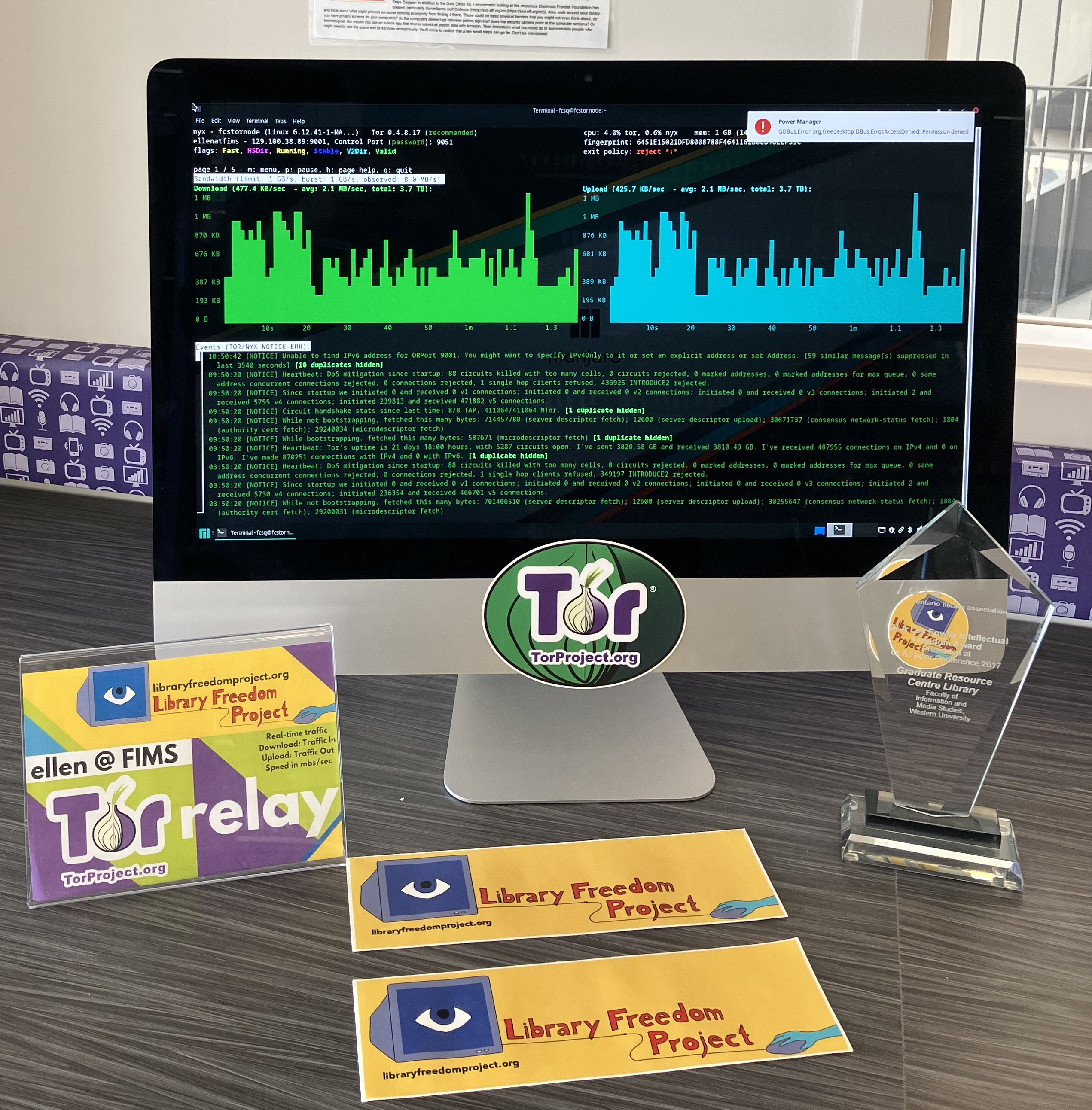
The Tor routing node at the FIMS Graduate Library

In 2011, FIMS partnered with the Faculty of Health Sciences at Western to offer master's and doctoral studies in the new Health Information Science program.

In 2016, FIMS celebrated the 50th anniversary of the Master's of Library and Information Science program. The year also marked another move, this time from the North Campus Building to the newly constructed FIMS and Nursing Building.

The first Tor anonymity network node at a Canadian library was established in March 2016 at FIMS, at the FIMS Graduate Library (previously the Graduate Resource Center). In recognition of the library's contributions to digital privacy and freedom at FIMS, the Ontario Library Association gave the FIMS Graduate Library the Les Fowlie Intellectual Freedom Award at the 2017 OLA Superconference.

== Programs ==
=== Undergraduate ===
==== Media, Information, and Technoculture (MIT) ====
This is the largest of FIMS's programs, with approximately 966 undergraduate students enrolled. Enrolment is limited to 250 students per year. The MIT program focuses on media theory, history, research and analysis.

The MIT program offers three and four year bachelor's degrees. Areas of concentration within MIT include Media Theory and Production, Advertising and Promotional Culture, Popular Music and Society, News Reporting and Journalistic Practices, Cultural Industries, The Information Society, Media Identity and Diversity, The Political Economy of Media, and Virtual Worlds and Interactive Media.

Students are provided with the option of combining the MIT program with Ivey School of Business (5 year program) and the Faculty of Law (6 year program). However, the Combined BA Honours Specialization in MIT /Juris DR (JD) program has been discontinued. The last date that students were eligible to be admitted to the law program was September 1, 2018, meaning that they must have been admitted to the MIT program in 2015. Students can also pursue a double major with MIT, combining other majors from different faculties.

==== Media & The Public Interest (MPI) ====
The MPI program has a limited enrolment of 20 students per year, focusing the curriculum on navigation and relationships within the political economy of communication, social movements, and global justice.

==== Creative Arts and Production (CAP) ====
The Creative Arts and Production program, introduced in 2022, is offered across three of Western's faculties: arts and humanities, information and media studies, and music. Students from all three faculties can apply for a spot in this limited enrolment program in Year 2 if they have completed the first-year pre-requisite courses.

==== Admissions and academics ====
Since enrolment in the MIT program is limited, MIT is a competitive program with ambitious students. For the honours specialization and major modules, students must complete their first-year requirements with no failed courses. For an honours specialization in MIT, students must have an average of 72% in their principal courses (with no mark below 60%) and a minimum grade of 70% in their first year MIT courses. For a major in MIT, students must have an average of 68% in their principle courses and a minimum grade of 65% in their first year MIT courses.

==== Internship program ====
The FIMS internship program (FIMS3999) is a 0.5 course credit available to eligible Year 3 and 4 students in FIMS. Placements are typically 140 hours each semester.

=== Graduate ===
- Master of Art in Media Studies
- Master of Art in Popular Music & Culture
- Master of Health Information Science
- Master of Library & Information Science
- Master of Media in Journalism & Communication
- PhD in Health Information Science
- PhD in Library & Information Science
- PhD in Media Studies

=== Certificates and diplomas ===
The Faculty of Information & Media Studies at Western University offers certificate and diploma programs in Digital Communications. The certificate/diploma in Digital Communications analyzes the environments of social media, the virtual world, and other emerging forms of online communication. Course content covers subjects such as digital content creation and the production of online communities.

- Certificate in Digital Communication
- Diploma in Digital Communication

== List of deans ==
Dean	Faculty	Active years
Andrew D. Osborn B.A., M.A., Ph.D., L.L.D (honorary)	SLIS	1967–1970
William J. Cameron B.A., M.A., Ph.D.	SLIS	1970–1984
Jean M. Tague-Sutcliffe B.A., B.L.S., Ph.D.	SLIS	1984–1995
Bernd P. Frohmann B.A., M.A., M.L.S., Ph.D.	FIMS	1995–1997 (acting)
G.A. Moran PhD	FIMS	1997–1998 (acting)
Manjunath Pendakur B.A., M.A., Ph.D.	FIMS	1998–2001
Catherine Ross B.A. Honors, M.A., M.L.I.S., Ph.D.	FIMS	2002–2007
Thomas Carmichael PhD	FIMS	2007–spring 2018
Susan Knabe PhD	FIMS	Spring 2018–present (acting)
Lisa Henderson PhD	FIMS	2019 onward

== Facilities ==
The FIMS & Nursing Building (FNB) currently houses the faculty at the corner of Lambton Drive and Huron Drive. Built in 2016, FNB is a shared building between the Faculty of Health sciences' Nursing Program and FIMS. FIMS was located in the North Campus Building (NCB) from 2004 to 2017.

The new FIMS & Nursing Building implements a number of progressive design features, such as co-ed bathrooms and deliberate use of large and numerous windows to flood the interior with natural light. Its architecture combines modern and minimalistic design concepts with touches of gothic style that characterizes Western's signature look. The building's design pays "homage to Western's classic style" with the inclusion of several gargoyles from the old Western Service Building at various entrances and corridors of the FNB.

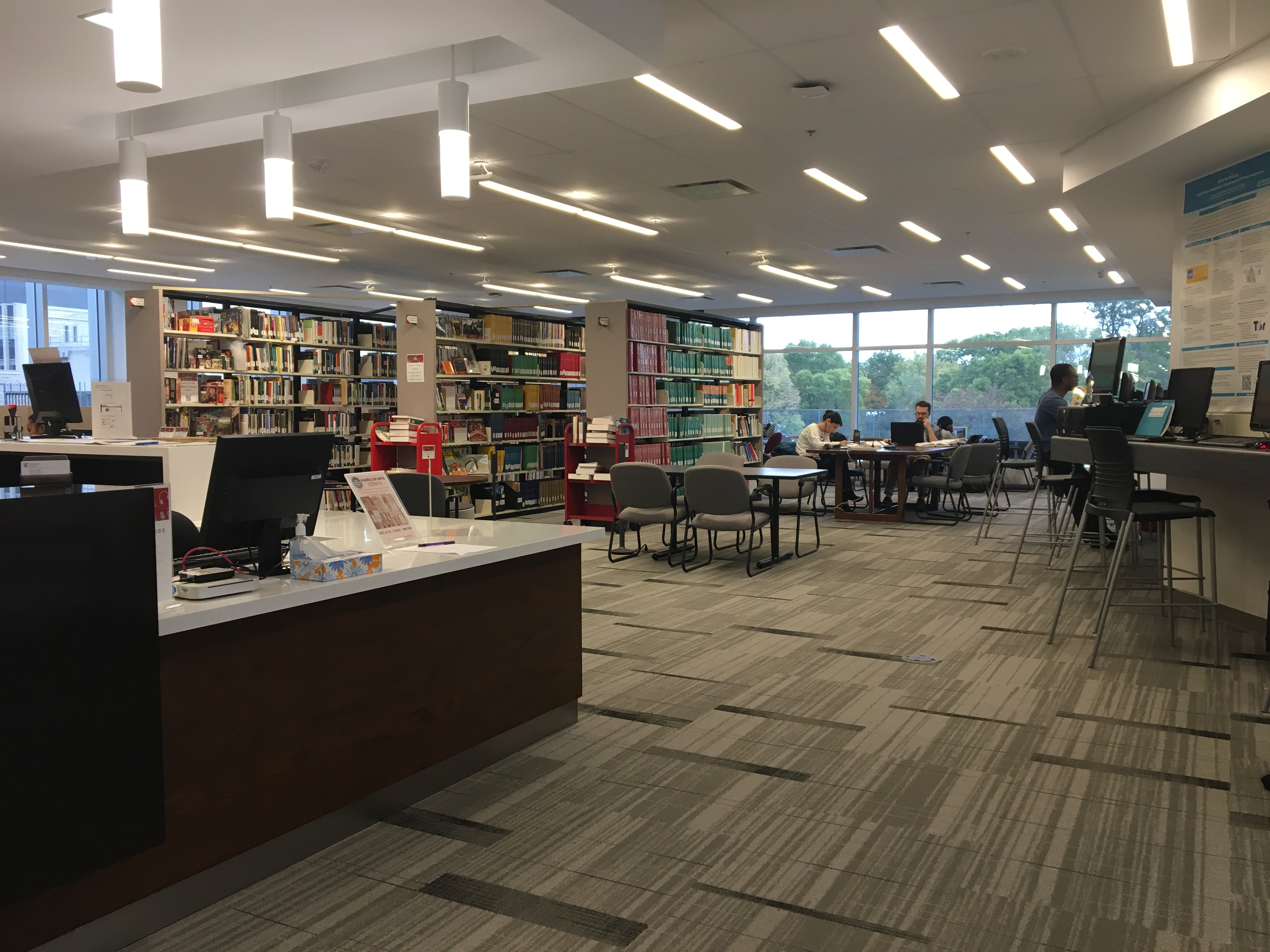
FIMS Graduate Library

Resources pertaining to FIMS members within FNB include classrooms, multi-media studios, computing labs, faculty and administrative offices, administrative spaces, and the FIMS Graduate Library.

=== FIMS Graduate Library ===
The FIMS Graduate library is located in room 3020 of the FNB. It is for the use of graduate students, graduate alumni, faculty, and staff of FIMS.

Resources the library offers include electronic databases, non-circulating print items, printing services, digital cameras, e-readers, tablets, a makerspace, reservable meeting rooms, and a reading room.

== Notable alumni and faculty ==
- Erika Casupanan, communications professional, media personality, and winner of Survivor
- Matthew Corrin, founder, chairman and former CEO of Freshii
- gunnarolla, filmmaker and influencer
