= Library and Information Science program at the University of Western Ontario =

University of Western Ontario Library and Information Science Program
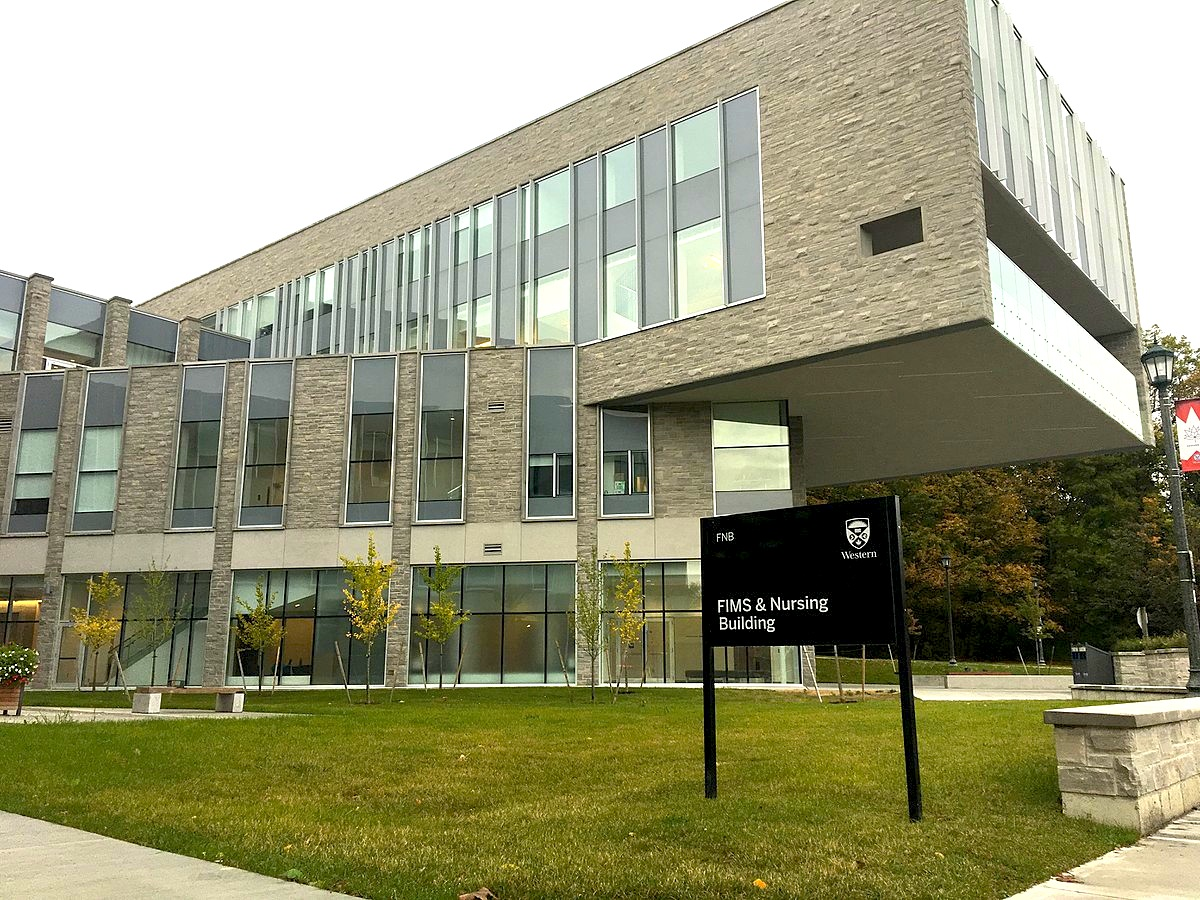
- Western's FIMS & Nursing Building
- Type: Public Professional School
- Established: 1966
- Affiliations: American Library Association
- Dean: Susan Knabe (acting)
- Academic staff: 34 full time faculty
- Location: London, Ontario, Canada
- Website: www.fims.uwo.ca

Located in London, Ontario, Canada, the Library and Information Science (LIS) program at the University of Western Ontario (also referred to as Western University) offers both Masters and PhD level programs through the Faculty of Information and Media Studies (FIMS). Its Master of Library and Information Science (MLIS) program is one of seven Canadian MLIS programs currently accredited by the American Library Association (ALA). Both the PhD and Masters programs in Library and Information Sciences at Western FIMS emphasize research skills development, engagement with professional literature, information technology learning, and professional career preparedness.

== History ==
=== School of Library and Information Science (SLIS) (1966–1992) ===
The Library and Information Science (LIS) program at the University of Western Ontario was established in 1966 as the School of Library and Information Science (SLIS). In response to a shortage of professional librarians in Canada in the 1960s, the Ontario government set up a committee to investigate the creation of a new library school. Andrew Delbridge Osborn, the SLIS's first dean, decided the SLIS would have its own library operating outside of the University of Western Ontario's library system in order to support library instruction and research. Generous funding allowed the SLIS to establish their general and special collections, including rare books and materials to support specialized coursework. The University of Western Ontario's MLS program officially began in September 1967 with 40 full-time and 20 part-time students.

=== Graduate School of Library and Information Science (GSLIS) (1993–1995) ===
The University of Western Ontario's School of Library and Information Science (SLIS) was renamed to the Graduate School of Library and Information Science (GSLIS) in 1993. The new name reflected the change in the school's degree designation from Master of Library Science (MLS) to Master of Library and Information Science (MLIS), which occurred in 1985. This change addressed the evolution of library schools across Canada to reflect the expanding impact of computers and technology on the discipline.

=== Faculty of Communications and Open Learning (FC&OL) (1996–1997) ===
The Graduate School of Library and Information Science merged with the Graduate School of Journalism to form the Faculty of Communications and Open Learning in 1996.

=== Faculty of Information and Media Studies (FIMS) (1997–present) ===
The Faculty of Communications and Open Learning was shortly thereafter renamed to the Faculty of Information and Media Studies (FIMS). As of 2016, there are 34 full-time faculty members in the Faculty of Information & Media Studies.

== Programs ==
=== Master of Library and Information Science (MLIS) ===
The University of Western Ontario's Faculty of Information and Media Studies is one of seven faculties in Canada which offers the Masters level graduate study in library and information science. The MLIS program is a professional-based Master's program designed to emphasize participation through a seminar style method of education. Tests and exams are not a common method of evaluation in this program, but there is a strong focus on group collaboration, presentation skills, and high quality academic writing. The MLIS program was founded on the belief that there is a common set of principles underlying the practices of all information professions. In order to reflect the values of the research university the program is housed in, there has been a long tradition in this program of developing curriculum that strives for a balance between professional practice and research based theory.

The University of Western Ontario offers the only MLIS degree in Canada which can be completed in 12 months. Students are required to complete a total of 15 courses, which can be completed in one academic year (3 terms, 12 months) if students take the full course load of five courses per term and do not participate in the co-op program. Students may also choose to take a reduced course load or complete the program on a part-time basis.

There are five required courses which all MLIS students are required to take:

- LIS 9001 (Perspectives on Library and Information Science)
- LIS 9002 (Information Organization, curation and Access)
- LIS 9003 (Information Sources and Services)
- LIS 9004 (Research Method and Statistics)
- LIS 9005 (Managing and Working in Information Organizations).

Students must also complete a total of 10 elective courses, choosing these electives from at least four out of the five program content areas:

- Information Organization, Curation, and Access
- Information Policy
- Connecting People with Information
- Information and Communication Technology
- Managing and Working in Information Institutions

==== Co-op Program ====
The LIS co-op program at the University of Western Ontario started in 1979, making it the first LIS co-op program in Canada. It allows students to engage in one or two paid work terms at a library or information-related position. However, co-op is not a requirement of the program and students do not gain credits towards their degree by completing co-op work terms. The placements are facilitated by the co-op office and arranged between the employers and students. The number and locations of placements vary each term.

=== Library and Information Science PhD ===
The Ontario Council of Graduate Studies approved the University of Western Ontario's LIS PhD program in 1973, and the first graduate of the program was awarded a PhD in Library and Information Sciences in 1978. The initial focus of the doctoral program was on bibliographical control, but the program has since shifted over the decades to cover two broad fields of specialization which represent the areas of research and teaching in the LIS PhD program: "Information & Society" and "Information Organization & Technologies". Current research clusters within the faculty and doctoral program include:

- Information and Communication Technologies
- Health Information and Policy
- Marxist Political Economy of Information
- Social Relations of Information Practices, Reading and Libraries
- Theoretical Problems in Information Studies: Philosophy, Ethics, Epistemology
- Webometrics and Infometrics

In addition to completing six courses (three required, three elective), doctoral candidates are required to complete a research proposal, thesis (including public presentation of thesis topic), qualifying exams, and they are also required to attend all LIS research colloquia. The length of the PhD program depends on each student's own pace and on their decision whether to participate in the PhD co-op program. Students may also choose to complete the PhD program on a part-time basis.

== Research groups ==
=== Sociodigital Media Lab ===
The Sociodigital Media Lab is run by Director Anabel Quan-Haase. The lab focuses on information communication technologies (ICTs) and their roles in social change. Key areas of investigation include Social networks, Social activism, Digital Humanities, Scholarly digital communication, Internet studies, Computer-mediated communication, and Opportunistic discovery of information & people.

=== Language and Information Technology Research Lab (LiTRL) ===
The Language and Information Technology Research Lab (LiTRL) is headed by Director Victoria L. Rubin. The lab's mission statement is to "improve access to information by developing language models, methods, and software applications that can approach human-like understanding of texts through Natural Language Processing (NLP) techniques." LiTRL's current research attempts to identifying deliberately misleading news articles, including satirical news, clickbait, fraud, and native advertising.

== American Library Association (ALA) Accreditation ==
The MLIS program at the University of Western Ontario has continually held its ALA accreditation since 1967/68.

== Facilities ==
The Library and Information Science programs are currently housed in the FIMS and Nursing Building (FNB) at the University of Western Ontario's main campus, after moving in December 2016. The library program was previously hosted in the following buildings: a temporary structure near the football stadium (1967–1982), Elborn College (1982–1998), Middlesex College (1998–2004), and North Campus Building (2004–2016).

=== Library ===
A key component of the LIS program at the University of Western Ontario is its faculty-supported library, which was first developed alongside the program's inception in 1966/1967 to support instruction, research, experimentation, and professional development. The library first operated entirely outside of the university library system; while still independent of the university system, it now works more closely with it than in its early years.

The current version of the program's independent library is called the FIMS Graduate Library, and is located in the FIMS and Nursing Building. It still primarily serves the LIS program but now also supports the other graduate programs within the Faculty of Media and Information Studies.

==== Library services and collections ====
The FIMS Graduate Library offers a number of resources to support FIMS graduate students' and faculty's research, instruction, assignment, collaboration, and project needs. The Library houses several bookable meeting spaces complete with presentation tools. The library also contains computer workstations, a maker space, scanners, printers, a reading room, study space, and the FIMS Graduate collection. Although the library collection does not circulate, the contents can be searched for using Western Libraries' Catalogue.

The library collection at the FIMS Graduate Library is intended to support the learning and research needs of FIMS Graduate students and faculty. The materials generally do not circulate, and can be used in the library space. In addition to the academic print collection, the FIMS Graduate Library provides non-circulating children's books, comics and graphic novels, DVDs, a censored books collection, board games, the Peter Desbarats journalism collection, and some rare books. The comic books and graphic novels, DVDs, and board games can be borrowed overnight by graduate students or faculty. In addition to the print resources in the library, the FIMS Graduate Library provides graduate students and faculty with access to a number of electronic databases to support research, learning, and professional development.

For student and faculty use, experimentation, and programming, the Library contains a makerspace, Bibliotech. Bibliotech contains both high and low-tech maker technology, such as a 3D printer, a Makeymakey, and craft supplies.

As part of the FIMS Graduate Library's involvement in students' professional development and learning, the library offers a series of seminars and workshops. The series, titled "The FIMS Graduate Library Presents...", invites faculty, staff, and guests to share their expertise with students in discussions, lectures, or hands-on workshops. The subject matter for this series ranges from information technology, to career preparedness, to social justice issues in the library and information science discipline.

==== Tor relay ====
Staff at the FIMS Graduate Library (previously, the Graduate Resource Centre) created Canada's first ever Tor relay service allowing for anonymous, encrypted internet browsing while improving access to information around the world. For this contribution to Internet privacy and freedom, the FIMS Graduate Library was recognized by the Ontario Library Association at the 2017 OLA Superconference. The OLA awarded the FIMS Graduate Library with the Les Fowlie Intellectual Freedom Award.

== List of deans ==
Deans	Active years
Andrew D. Osborn B.A., M.A., Ph.D., L.L.D (Honorary)	1967-1970
William J. Cameron B.A., M.A., Ph.D.	1970-1984
Jean M. Tague-Sutcliffe B.A., B.L.S., Ph.D.	1984-1995
Bernd P. Frohmann B.A., M.A., M.L.S., Ph.D.	1995-1997 (Acting)
G.A. Moran PhD	1997-1998 (Acting)
Manjunath Pendakur B.A., M.A., Ph.D.	1998-2001
Catherine Ross B.A. Honors, M.A., M.L.I.S., Ph.D.	2002-2007
Thomas Carmichael PhD	2007–2019
Lisa Henderson PhD	2019-present

== Reputation ==
Recent LIS research and literature reviews are positive, including reviews by Blaise Cronin and Kara Overfelt. Cronin and Overfelt found that the University of Western Ontario was ranked 2nd regarding average number of peer-reviewed journal articles per faculty member. William Walters and Esther Isabelle Wilder examined articles published by professionals in the Library and information science discipline and found that the University of Western Ontario had one of the most productive non-iSchool LIS departments. Western's LIS department was ranked 20th out of 40 in Walters' and Wilder's overall rankings of top departmental contributions to LIS literature, and as the highest Canadian University at 9th out of 55 when only U.S. and Canadian departments were considered.

When examining the disciplinary composition of library schools, Irene Lopatovska and Ellie Ransom found that Western's LIS program was among the schools that had the highest percentage of faculty members with training in library professions (42 percent of faculty). The researchers also gave the faculty a high disciplinary rating for having faculty trained across seven different disciplines, including: computing, information, library, social and behavioural sciences, education, humanities, and communication.

Western's MLIS program reports a good employment placement rate. A 2016 survey by FIMS found that 70% of respondents found employment within or around 6 months after graduation. Out of the 70% that found employment, 95% found employment in the Library and Information Sciences field. The survey collected responses from 60 out of 114 MLIS students who graduated from Western in 2016. Most graduates found employment at public libraries (42.5% of those employed) or academic libraries (25% of those employed). 57.5 of those students who found work cited the co-op experience as being most helpful in helping them acquire skills and knowledge to secure employment.

== Student groups and activities ==
There are several student groups that operate within the Library and Information Science program at Western. Some of these groups include MLIS Student Council, Librarians Without Borders, the Special Libraries Association, Student Librarians Association for Children and Youth Services (SLACYS), Association of Canadian Archivists (ACA) and the Art Libraries Society of North America (ARLIS/NA).

LIS students and graduates from University of Western Ontario have also been active in their community promoting digital literacy and sharing their love of books. Occasionally, faculty members host public interest discussions on relevant events and recent research at their local public libraries to engage with their community.

Emerging Library & Information Perspectives (ELIP) is an open access, peer-reviewed journal led by graduate LIS students within the faculty and has been actively contributing to the field of library and information science since 2018.
