= Occurrence of thorium =

Natural occurrence of chemical element

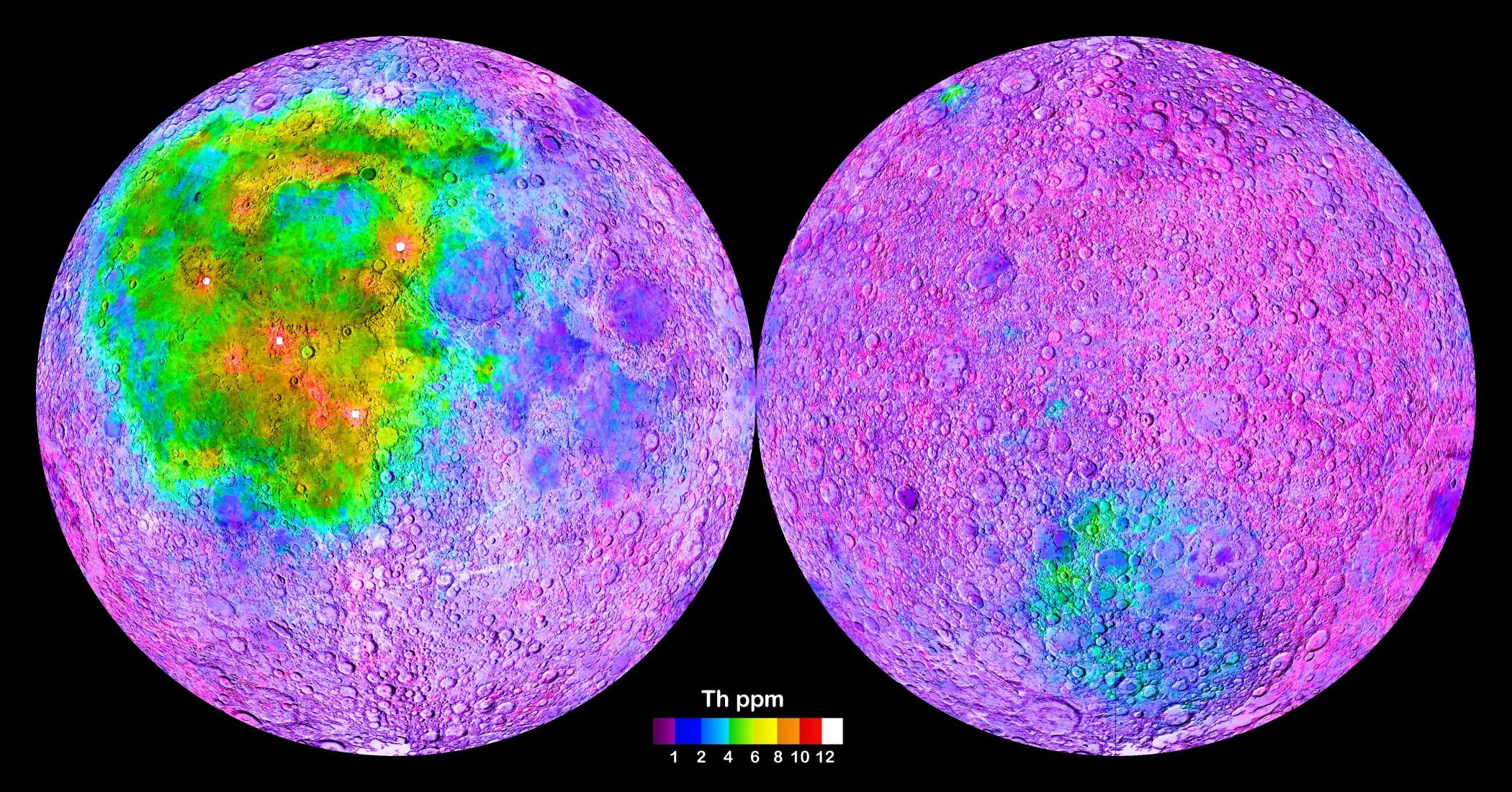
Thorium concentrations on the Moon, as mapped by Lunar Prospector.

Thorium is found in small amounts in most rocks and soils. Soil commonly contains an average of around 6 parts per million (ppm) of thorium. Thorium occurs in several minerals including thorite (ThSiO_{4}), thorianite (ThO_{2} + UO_{2}) and monazite. Thorianite is a rare mineral and may contain up to about 12% thorium oxide. Monazite contains 2.5% thorium, allanite has 0.1 to 2% thorium and zircon can have up to 0.4% thorium. Thorium-containing minerals occur on all continents. Thorium is several times more abundant in Earth's crust than all isotopes of uranium combined and thorium-232 is several hundred times more abundant than uranium-235.

Thorium concentrations near the surface of the Earth can be mapped using gamma spectroscopy. The same technique has been used to detect concentrations on the surface of the Moon; the near side has high abundances of relatively thorium-rich KREEP, while the Compton–Belkovich Thorium Anomaly was detected on the far side. Martian thorium has also been mapped by 2001 Mars Odyssey.

^{232}Th decays very slowly (its half-life is comparable to the age of the universe) but other thorium isotopes occur in the thorium and uranium decay chains. Most of these are short-lived and hence much more radioactive than ^{232}Th, though on a mass basis they are negligible.

== Thorium resource estimates ==
India's thorium is mostly located in a contiguous belt of eastern coastal states as placer sands. 2016 monazite reserve estimates: Andhra Pradesh (31%) Tamil Nadu (21%), and Odisha (20%) Kerala (16%), and West Bengal (10%) Jharkhand (2%)

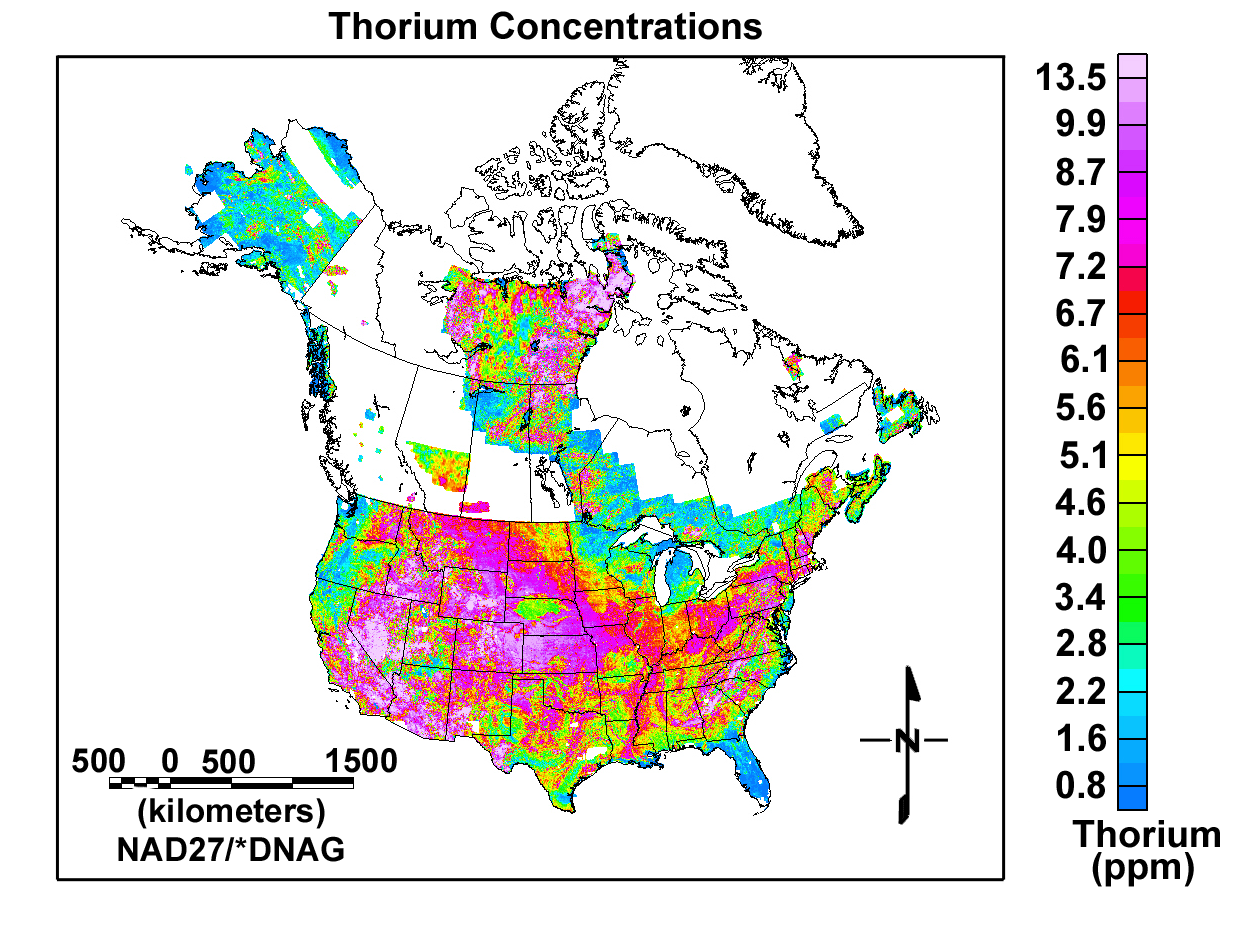
Partial North American map of thorium concentrations from the United States Geological Survey.

Present knowledge of the distribution of thorium resources is poor because of the relatively low-key exploration efforts arising out of insignificant demand. There are two sets of estimates that define world thorium reserves, one set by the United States Geological Survey (USGS) and the other supported by reports from the OECD and the International Atomic Energy Agency (the IAEA). Under the USGS estimate, India, the United States, and Australia have particularly large reserves of thorium.

India and Australia are believed to possess about 300,000 tonnes each; i.e. each has 25% of the world's thorium reserves. In the OECD reports, however, estimates of Australia's Reasonably Assured Reserves (RAR) of thorium indicate only 19,000 tonnes and not 300,000 tonnes as indicated by USGS. The two sources vary wildly for countries such as Brazil, Turkey, and Australia, but both reports appear to show some consistency with respect to India's thorium reserve figures, with 290,000 tonnes (USGS) and 319,000 tonnes (OECD/IAEA).

Both the IAEA and OECD appear to conclude that India may possess the largest share of world's thorium deposits.

The IAEA's 2005 report estimates India's reasonably assured reserves of thorium at 319,000 tonnes, but mentions recent reports of India's reserves at 650,000 tonnes. A government of India estimate, shared in the country's Parliament in August 2011, puts the recoverable reserve at 846,477 tonnes. The Indian Minister of State V. Narayanasamy stated that as of May 2013, the country's thorium reserves were 11.93 million tonnes (monazite, having 9–10% ThO_{2}, with a significant majority (8.59 Mt; 72%) found in the three eastern coastal states of Andhra Pradesh (3.72 Mt; 31%), Tamil Nadu (2.46 Mt; 21%) and Odisha (2.41 Mt; 20%). Additionally, reports suggest that large deposits may exist in the adjacent Bay of Bengal, and on the independent island nation of Sri Lanka.

The prevailing estimate of the economically available thorium reserves comes from the USGS, Mineral Commodity Summaries (1996–2010):

USGS Estimates in tonnes (1999)
Country	Reserves
Australia	300,000
India	290,000
Norway	170,000
United States	160,000
Canada	100,000
South Africa	35,000
Brazil	16,000
Other Countries	95,000
World Total	1,200,000

USGS Estimates in tonnes (2011)
Country	Reserves
India	963,000
United States	440,000
Australia	300,000
Canada	100,000
South Africa	35,000
Brazil	16,000
Malaysia	4,500
Other Countries	90,000
World Total	1,913,000

Note: The OECD/NEA report notes that the estimates (that the Australian figures are based on) are subjective, due to the variability in the quality of the data, a lot of which is old and incomplete. Adding to the confusion are subjective claims made by the Australian government (in 2009, through its Geoscience department) that combine the reasonably assured reserves (RAR) estimates with "inferred" data (i.e. subjective guesses). This strange combined figure of RAR and "guessed" reserves yields a figure, published by the Australian government, of 489,000 tonnes, however, using the same criteria for Brazil or India would yield reserve figures of between 600,000 and 1,300,000 tonnes for Brazil and between 300,000 and 600,000 tonnes for India. Irrespective of isolated claims by the Australian government, the most credible third-party and multi-lateral reports, those of the OECD/IAEA and the USGS, consistently report high thorium reserves for India while not doing the same for Australia.

=== Alternate estimates ===
Another estimate of reasonably assured reserves (RAR) and estimated additional reserves (EAR) of thorium comes from OECD/NEA, Nuclear Energy, "Trends in Nuclear Fuel Cycle", Paris, France (2001):

IAEA Estimates in tonnes (2005)
Country	RAR Th	EAR Th
India	519,000	21%
Australia	489,000	19%
USA	400,000	13%
Turkey	344,000	11%
Venezuela	302,000	10%
Brazil	302,000	10%
Norway	132,000	4%
Egypt	100,000	3%
Russia	75,000	2%
Greenland	54,000	2%
Canada	44,000	2%
South Africa	18,000	1%
"Other countries"	33,000	2%
"World total"	2,810,000	

The preceding reserve figures refer to the amount of thorium in high-concentration deposits inventoried so far and estimated to be extractable at current market prices; millions of times more total exist in Earth's 3×10^{19} tonne crust, around 120 trillion tons of thorium, and lesser but vast quantities of thorium exist at intermediate concentrations. Proved reserves are "a poor indicator of the total future supply of a mineral resource".

Further estimates are provided by the World Nuclear Association as:

Lower-bound estimates of thorium reserves in thousands of tonnes, 2020
Country	Reserves
India	1070
Brazil	632
Australia	595
United States	595
Egypt	380
Turkey	374
Venezuela	300
Canada	172
Russia	155
South Africa	148
China	300
Norway	87
Greenland	93
Finland	60
Sweden	50
Kazakhstan	50
Other countries	1,725
World total	6390.4

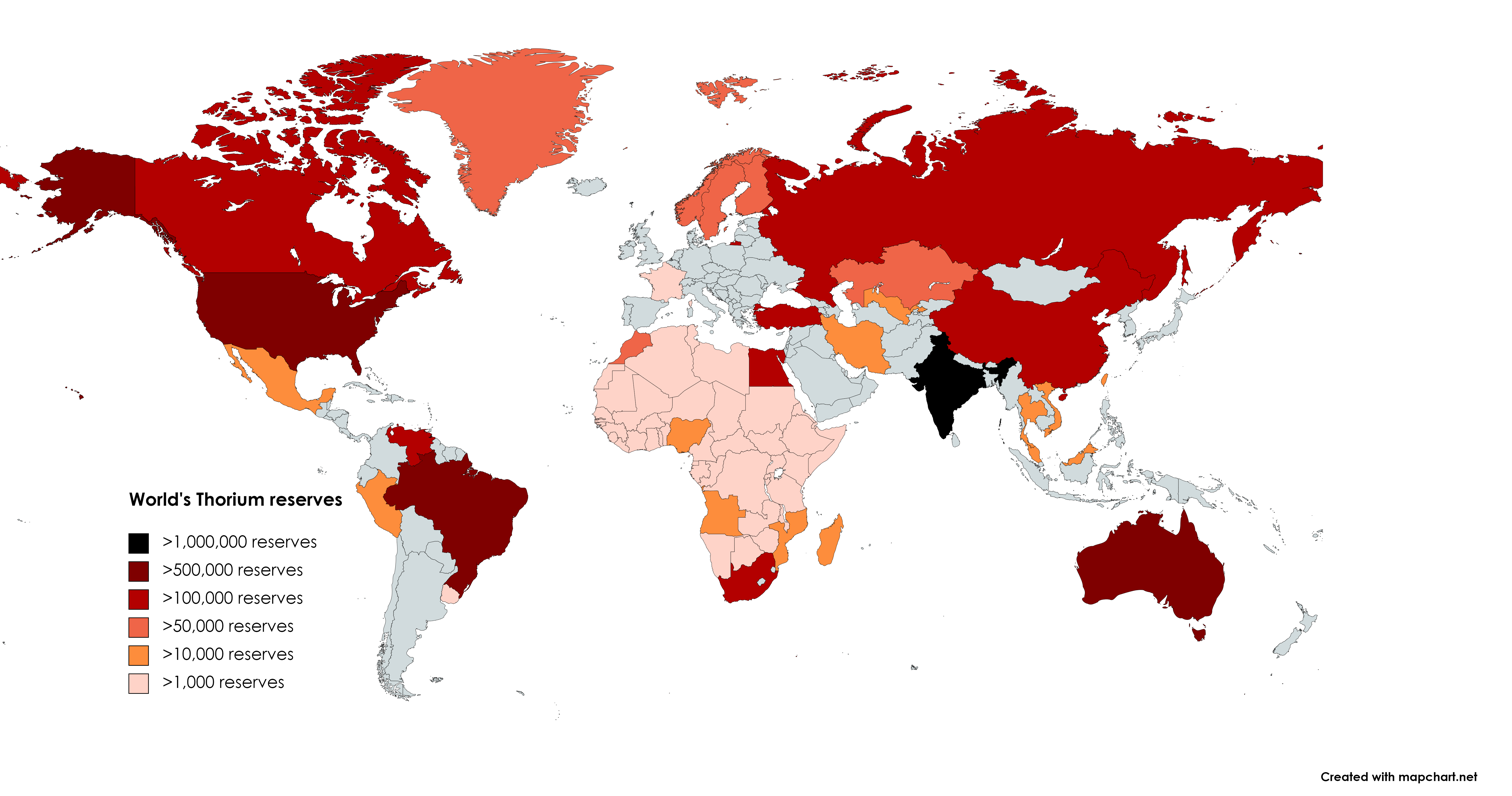

The Lemhi Pass, along the Idaho-Montana border, has one of the world's largest known high-quality thorium deposits. Thorium Energy, Inc. has the mineral rights to approximately 1360 acres (5.5 sq km) of it and states that they have proven thorium oxide reserves of 600 thousand tons and probable reserves of an additional 1.8 million tons within their claim.

In event of a thorium fuel cycle, Conway granite with 56 (±6) parts per million thorium could provide a major low-grade resource; a 307 sq mile (795 sq km) "main mass" in New Hampshire is estimated to contain over three million metric tons per 100 feet (30 m) of depth (i.e. 1 kg thorium in eight cubic metres of rock), of which two-thirds is "readily leachable". Even common granite rock with 13 PPM thorium concentration (just twice the crustal average, along with 4 ppm uranium) contains potential nuclear energy equivalent to 50 times the entire rock's mass in coal, although there is no incentive to resort to such very low-grade deposits so long as much higher-grade deposits remain available and cheaper to extract. Thorium has been produced in excess of demand from the refining of rare-earth elements.

== Bibliography ==
- Wickleder, Mathias S.; Fourest, Blandine; Dorhourt, Peter K. (2006). "Thorium". In Morss, Lester R.; Edelstein, Norman M.; Fuger, Jean (eds.). The Chemistry of the Actinide and Transactinide Elements (3rd ed.). Springer Science+Business Media. ISBN 1-4020-3555-1.
