= Jean Tague-Sutcliffe =

Jean Tague-Sutcliffe (1931–1996) was an information scientist known for her contributions to the field of informetrics. She developed models for information measurement and information retrieval using empirical methods and statistical data. She served as Dean of the Graduate School of Library and Information Science at the University of Western Ontario from 1984 to 1995.

== Education and career ==
Tague-Sutcliffe obtained a bachelor of library science degree from McGill University and a Ph.D. from Western Reserve University.

Her research primarily focused on the development of mathematical models for retrieval of information, with an emphasis on bibliometrics. She helped developed statistical tests for experiments run by the Text Retrieval Conference (TREC) in the 1990s.

She became the Dean of the Graduate School of Library and Information Science at the University of Western Ontario in 1984 and served in that position until 1995, the year before her death. She was a long-time member of the American Society for Information Science (now known as the Association for Information Science and Technology, serving as Director-at-Large and winning two awards from the organization for her publications.

== Notable works ==
=== Book ===
- Measuring Information: An Information Services Perspective (1995)

=== Selected papers ===
- "Collaborative coefficient: A single measure of the degree of collaboration in research" (1988)
- "Evaluation of the user interface in an information retrieval system: A model" (1989)
- "Complete formal model for information retrieval systems" (1991)
- "An introduction to informetrics" (1992)

== Awards ==
- Award of Merit - Association for Information Science and Technology (1996)
- Best Information Science Book Award - Association for Information Science and Technology (1996)

== Legacy ==
The Association for Library and Information Science Education (ALISE) holds the annual Jean Tague-Sutcliffe Doctoral Student Research Poster Competition, established in Tague-Sucliffe's memory by students at University of Western Ontario in 1997.
