= Middlesex College =

Middlesex College may refer to:

- Middlesex College (New Jersey)
- Middlesex College (United Kingdom)
- Middlesex College (University of Western Ontario)
- Middlesex University (Massachusetts)

== See also ==
- Middlesex Community College (disambiguation)
