= Elsie Jury =

Canadian archaeologist

Elsie McLeod Murray Jury
- Born: Mary Alice McLeod Murray; 11 October 1910; Perth, Ontario, Canada
- Died: 31 March 1993 (aged 82); Ontario, Canada
- Occupations: Archaeologist; Historian; Archivist
- Known for: Excavations at Sainte-Marie among the Hurons; Role in establishing the Fanshawe Pioneer Village and Museum of Ontario Archaeology
- Spouse: Wilfrid Jury

Academic background
- Education: University of Toronto (BA, 1933); Columbia University (MA, 1935); University of Toronto (1938)

Academic work
- Discipline: Archaeology
- Sub-discipline: Historical archaeology; Archaeology of Ontario
- Institutions: Toronto Public Library; Western Libraries; Royal Ontario Museum

Elsie McLeod Murray Jury (11 October 1910 – 31 March 1993) was a Canadian archaeologist and historian known for her pioneering work on the historical archaeology of Ontario, especially her work on the excavations at Sainte-Marie among the Hurons. She worked with her husband playing a key role in establishing the Fanshawe Pioneer Village and Museum of Ontario Archaeology.

== Education and early career ==
Mary Alice McLeod Murray, who went by the first name Elsie, was born in Perth, Ontario, in 1910. Of Scottish and Irish descent, her father was David Cameron Murray (1873–1938), a doctor, and her mother was Lucy L. Robinson. The family later relocated from Perth to Toronto, where Elsie attended the Riverdale Collegiate Institute. She studied at the University of Toronto, obtaining an undergraduate degree in history and English in 1933, and Columbia University, graduating with an MA in history in 1935. Her Master's thesis was on the Scottish settlers of Perth County.

After graduating from Columbia, Jury returned to Toronto to work for the Toronto Public Library, at the same time studying for a degree in library science from the University of Toronto, which she completed in 1938. Her first publications, published in 1940 and 1942 in the Ontario Library Review, were based on research that completed at the Toronto Public Library.

In 1942, Jury moved to London, Ontario, to take a position at the library of the University of Western Ontario under Fred Landon, whom she had met earlier through the Ontario Historical Society. She undertook research and wrote articles published in the Ontario Library Review, Library Journal, School, Food for Thought and two publications of the Ontario Historical Society. She also published in two periodicals started by Landon, Western Ontario Historical Notes and Western Ontario Historical Nuggets. From 1942 until 1947, she wrote articles for several newspapers, including the London Free Press. She also worked with J. J. Talman, a historian and fellow librarian at Western, on a re-edition of a novel by Anna Brownell Jameson, published in 1838 as Winter Studies and Summer Rambles in Canada.

== Archaeological career ==
Jury met Wilfrid Jury in 1944. Wilfrid was an archaeologist who had previously worked with Fred Landon to gain Western University's support in establishing the Museum of Indian Archaeology and Pioneer Life (now the Museum of Ontario Archaeology), and he initially hired Elsie to conduct historical research relating to his excavations of the Fairfield Mission. The two married in 1948 and after returning from their honeymoon Elsie joined Wilfrid at his excavations of the Crawford prehistoric village in Lambton County, their first joint archaeological project. This site demonstrated the westernmost edge of Iroquoian sites in southwestern Ontario and it was dated to the Middle Iroquoian period (1300-1350 A.D.). Thereafter the Jurys collaborated on almost all of their subsequent excavations starting with the Burley Site, followed by Sainte Marie 1 followed by the military and naval establishments at Penetanguishene. They co-authored a report on the site which was published in Ontario History (1951) and subsequently as a Museum of Indian Archaeology Bulletin #9 Penetanguishene contained one of a number of sites that exist in the region between Lake Simcoe and Georgian Bay which archaeologists working in Ontario call "Huronia". The sites in this region were occupied by Iroquoian-speaking Huron indigenous peoples between the 15th and the 17th century.

At Penetanguishene, Jury noted that hay for livestock was imported to the site by scow. At Sainte-Marie, she and her husband recognised the importance of the Catholic identity of the inhabitants to the interpretation of the site. Both Elsie and Wilfred worked on the excavation and reconstruction of the Penetanguishine Military and Naval establishments for many years. They had a long relationship with the Society of Jesus due to their work in Sainte Marie I. Both Elsie and Wilfred envisaged Fanshaw Pioneer Village, in London Ontario, as an educational facility to preserve local heritage during the 1940s but it was not until 1959, in conjunction with University of Western Ontario when it finally opened. Wilf Jury died in 1981.

=== Sites excavated ===
- Crawford Village Site, Bosanquet Township, Lambton County, Ontario
- Sainte - Marie 1, Ontario, Canada
- Forget, Ontario, Canada
- Penetanguishene, Ontario, Canada
- Nine-Mile Portage, Ontario, Canada – an overland route from the head of Kempenfelt Bay in Lake Simcoe, where Barrie currently exists, to Willow Creek, a tributary of the Nottawasaga River which empties into Georgian Bay at Wasaga Beach; one of the early land routes between Lake Ontario and Lake Huron.
- Fort Willow, Ontario, Canada
- Burley Site, Ontario, Canada

== Selected publications ==
Sole author:

- Jury, Elsie 1959 The Establishments at Penetanguishene: Bastion of the North 1814-1856 London, Ontario: University of Western Ontario
- Jury, Elsie M. 1963 Indian village and mission sites of Huronia Canadian Geographical Journal, Volume 67 (3): 94-103.
- Jury, Elsie McLeod 1966 Anadabijou in Dictionary of Canadian Biography, vol. 1, University of Toronto/Université Laval, Year of publication: 1966, revised edition: 1979
- Jury, Elsie McLeod 1966 Batiscan in Dictionary of Canadian Biography, vol. 1, University of Toronto/Université Laval, Year of publication: 1966, revised edition: 1979
- Jury, Elsie McLeod 1966 Begourat in Dictionary of Canadian Biography, vol. 1, University of Toronto/Université Laval, Year of publication: 1966, revised edition: 1979
- Jury, Elsie McLeod 1966 Savignon in Dictionary of Canadian Biography, vol. 1, University of Toronto/Université Laval, Year of publication: 1966, revised edition: 1979
- Jury, Elsie McLeod 1966 Atironta (fl. 1615) in Dictionary of Canadian Biography, vol. 1, University of Toronto/Université Laval, Year of publication: 1966, revised edition: 1979
- Jury, Elsie McLeod 1966 Atironta, Pierre (d. 1672) in Dictionary of Canadian Biography, vol. 1, University of Toronto/Université Laval, Year of publication: 1966, revised edition: 1979
- Jury, Elsie McLeod 1966 Aoindaon in Dictionary of Canadian Biography, vol. 1, University of Toronto/Université Laval, Year of publication: 1966, revised edition: 1979
- Jury, Elsie McLeod 1966 Tessouat (d. 1636) in Dictionary of Canadian Biography, vol. 1, University of Toronto/Université Laval, Year of publication: 1966, revised edition: 1979
- Jury, Elsie McLeod 1966 Tessouat (fl. 1603-13) in Dictionary of Canadian Biography, vol. 1, University of Toronto/Université Laval, Year of publication: 1966, revised edition: 1979
- Jury, Elsie McLeod 1966 Auoindaon in Dictionary of Canadian Biography, vol. 1, University of Toronto/Université Laval, Year of publication: 1966, revised edition: 1979
- Jury, Elsie McLeod 1966 SKANUDHAROUA, Geneviève-Agnes, de Tous-les-Saints in Dictionary of Canadian Biography, vol. 1, University of Toronto/Université Laval, Year of publication: 1966, revised edition: 1979
- Jury, Elsie McLeod 1966 TEHORENHAEGNON in Dictionary of Canadian Biography, vol. 1, University of Toronto/Université Laval, Year of publication: 1966, revised edition: 1979
- Jury, Elsie McLeod 1966 TOTIRI, Étienne in Dictionary of Canadian Biography, vol. 1, University of Toronto/Université Laval, Year of publication: 1966, revised edition: 1979
- Jury, Elsie McLeod 1966 CARIGOUAN (Carigonan) in Dictionary of Canadian Biography, vol. 1, University of Toronto/Université Laval, Year of publication: 1966, revised edition: 2014
- Jury, Elsie McLeod 1966 PIGAROUICH, Étienne in Dictionary of Canadian Biography, vol. 1, University of Toronto/Université Laval, Year of publication: 1966, revised edition: 1979
- Jury, Elsie McLeod 1966 TARATOUAN in Dictionary of Canadian Biography, vol. 1, University of Toronto/Université Laval, Year of publication: 1966, revised edition: 1979
- Jury, Elsie McLeod 1966 MIRISTOU in Dictionary of Canadian Biography, vol. 1, University of Toronto/Université Laval, Year of publication: 1966, revised edition: 1979
- Jury, Elsie McLeod 1966 PIESKARET, Simon in Dictionary of Canadian Biography, vol. 1, University of Toronto/Université Laval, Year of publication: 1966, revised edition: 1979
- Jury, Elsie McLeod 1966 TEOUATIRON, Joseph in Dictionary of Canadian Biography, vol. 1, University of Toronto/Université Laval, Year of publication: 1966, revised edition: 1979
- Jury, Elsie McLeod 1966 CHOMINA (Choumin)in Dictionary of Canadian Biography, vol. 1, University of Toronto/Université Laval, Year of publication: 1966, revised edition: 2019
- Jury, Elsie McLeod 1966 IROQUET in Dictionary of Canadian Biography, vol. 1, University of Toronto/Université Laval, Year of publication: 1966, revised edition: 1979
- Jury, Elsie McLeod 1966 ANNAOTAHA, Étienne in Dictionary of Canadian Biography, vol. 1, University of Toronto/Université Laval, Year of publication: 1966, revised edition: 1979
- Jury, Elsie McLeod Murray 1974 The Neutral Indians of Southwestern Ontario. London: MIA, Bulletin 13 (Reprinted, 1977).

Joint author:

- Jury, Wilfrid and Elsie M. Jury 1952 The Burley Site. Ontario History 44:57-75.
- Jury, Wilfrid and Elsie M. Jury 1952 University of Western Ontario. Museum of Indian Archaeology and Pioneer Life. Bulletin No.9 [57]-75 pages illustrations 26 cm.
- Jury, Wilfrid and Elsie M. Jury 1954 Sainte-Marie Among Hurons. Toronto: Oxford University Press.
- Jury, Wilfrid and Elsie M. Jury 1955 Saint Louis: Huron Village and Jesuit Mission Site. London: MIA, Bulletin 10.
- Jury, Wilfrid, and Elsie M. Jury 1956 The Nine Mile Portage From Kempenfelt Bay to the Nottawasaga River. Museum Bulletin, 11. London: Museum of Indian Archaeology, The University of Western Ontario.
