= Cornelia Gaskins Harcum =

American archaeologist

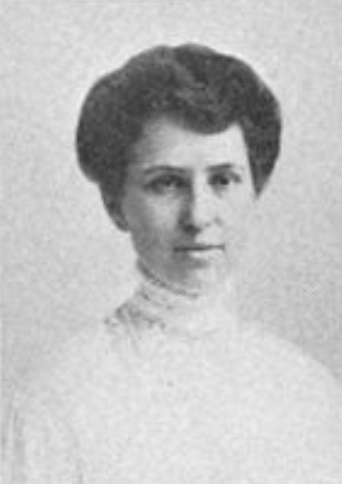
- Cornelia G. Harcum, from the 1908 yearbook of Goucher College
- Born: July 3, 1878; Reedville, Virginia, U.S.
- Died: May 19, 1927 (age 48); Baltimore, Maryland, U.S.
- Occupations: Archaeologist, college professor, college administrator

Cornelia Gaskins Harcum (July 3, 1878 – May 19, 1927) was an American archaeologist, professor, curator, and college administrator.

== Early life and education ==
Harcum was born in Reedville, Virginia, the daughter of Octavius J. Harcum and Cornelia Isabella Haskins Harcum. Her mother died soon after Harcum's birth. Her younger half-brother, Marvin Harcum, co-founded Harcum College in Pennsylvania. She graduated from Western High School in 1899, and from Goucher College in 1907. She earned a master's degree at Johns Hopkins University in 1912, and completed doctoral studies in archaeology at Johns Hopkins in 1914, under advisor David Moore Robinson. Robinson recalled her in 1927 as "one of the best archaeology students ever graduated from Hopkins."

== Career ==
Harcum taught school in Baltimore between 1907 and 1910. She taught Greek at Wellesley College and Latin at Vassar College. She was dean of women at Rockford College in Illinois. In 1918 she spoke at the Classical Association of the Atlantic States meeting in Philadelphia, about Roman foodways during wartime shortages, saying "There is scarcely a problem in our complicated food situation of today which was not familiar to the Romans."

Harcum moved to Toronto in 1920 to work at the Royal Ontario Museum of Archaeology. She was an associate professor of fine arts at the University of Toronto. In 1921 she became head of Oaklawn House at the University of Toronto. She was also secretary of the Toronto Archeological Society. She traveled to Santa Fe in 1921, to study Pueblo pottery. In 1926, she gave a radio lecture on Roman table manners.

== Publications ==
- Roman Cooks (1914)
- "The Ages of Man; a Study Suggested by Horace, Ars Poetica, Lines 153-178" (1914)
- "A Study of Dietetics Among the Romans" (1918)
- "A Statue of Aphrodite in the Royal Ontario Museum of Archaeology" (1921)
- "Roman Cooking Utensils in the Royal Ontario Museum of Archaeology" (1921)
- "The Romano-British Collection in the Royal Ontario Museum of Archaeology" (1925)
- "A Statue of the Type Called the Venus Genetrix in the Royal Ontario Museum" (1927)
- "A Catalogue of the Greek Vases in the Royal Ontario Museum of Archaeology" (1930, published posthumously)

== Personal life ==
Harcum's uncle, Hiram H. Gaskins, left her money when he died in 1907. Harcum died in 1927, at the age of 48, in Baltimore, Maryland. Her will left some money to Johns Hopkins University, to fund "scholarships for women in classical archaeology".
