= Fanshawe Pioneer Village =

Open-air museum in London, Ontario, Canada

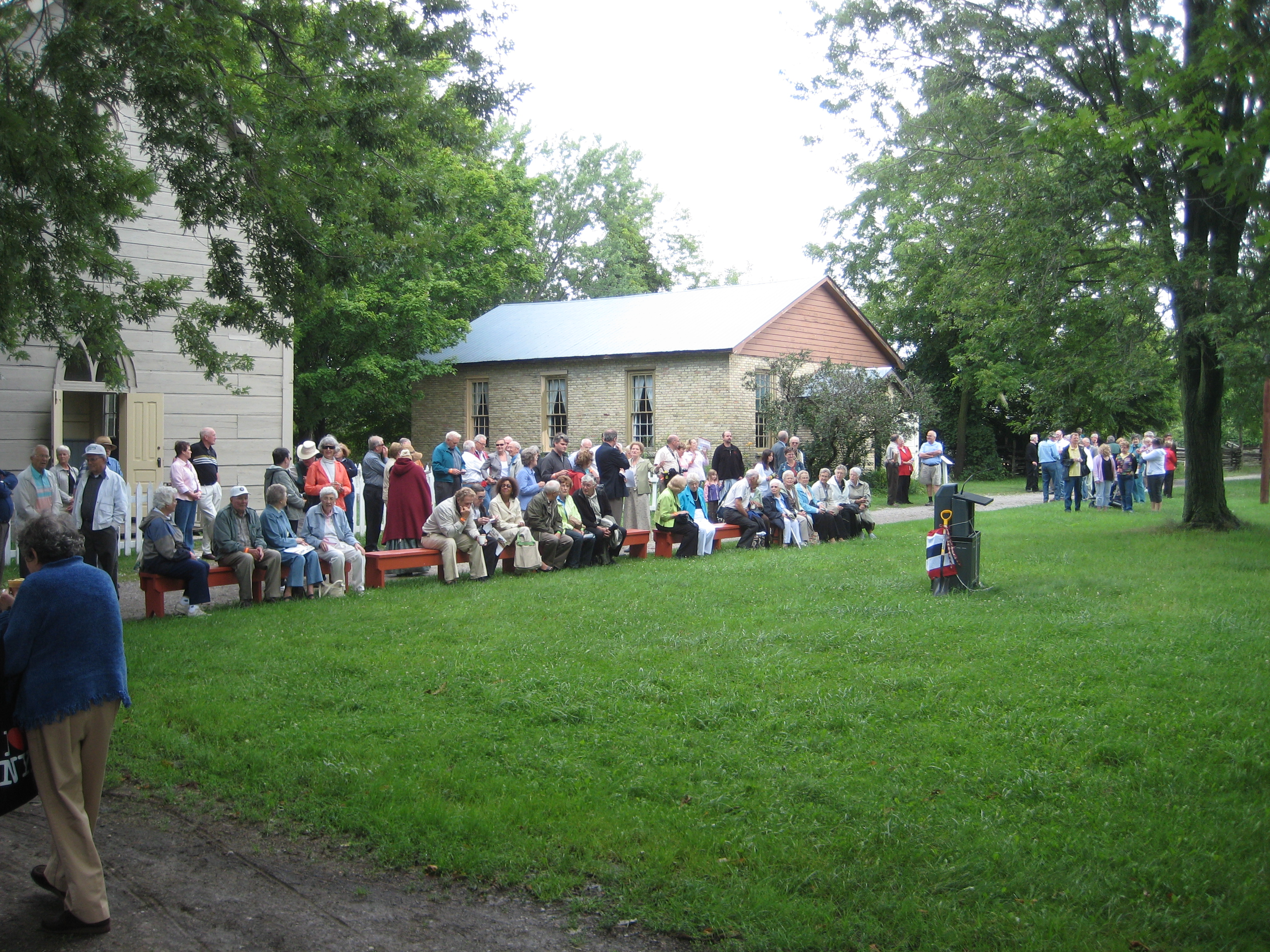

- Location of the museum in London, Ontario
- Established: 1959
- Location: 2609 Fanshawe Park Road East; London, Ontario, Canada; N5X 4A1
- Coordinates: 43°03′08″N 81°11′41″W
- Type: historic site
- Collection size: 33 buildings
- Director: Dawn Miskelly
- Owners: London and Middlesex Heritage Museum
- Public transit access: none
- Parking: on-site, free
- Website: www.fanshawepioneervillage.ca

Fanshawe Pioneer Village is an open-air museum established in 1959 and located in the Fanshawe Conservation Area in London, Ontario. The village uses historical re-enactments to communicate the history of rural communities in the former townships of Westminster, London, North Dorchester, Delaware, West Nissouri and Lobo in Middlesex County from 1820 to 1920 and the founding and development of the City of London up to 1840.

The heritage village is owned and operated by the London and Middlesex Heritage Museum, a not-for-profit charity, with the support of the City of London, the Upper Thames River Conservation Authority, the Municipality of Thames Centre and the Municipality of Middlesex Centre. The intended purpose of the pioneer village is to involve the community in the preservation of history and tradition through living history experiences.

== History ==
Fanshawe Pioneer Village was first conceived in 1955 under the Upper Thames River Conservation Authority's responsibility to conserve historic structures in the Upper Thames watershed. The Village officially opened on June 26, 1959 with support from Dr. Wilfrid Jury, Director of the University of Western Ontario's Museum of Indian Archaeology and Pioneer Life. In 1961, the site was enlarged to 2.2 acres and in 1963, the Authority set aside an additional 22 acres for future development. Wilfrid Jury had accumulated a large collection of pioneer artefacts which were exhibited at Middlesex College, University of Western Ontario. This collection was brought to the Village and formally donated to the Upper Thames River Conservation Authority in 1978. By 1980, the Village consisted of 23 buildings placed throughout the original 22 acres. Today the village consists of 33 original and replica historic structures on 46 acres.

== Museum and Programs ==
=== Collection ===
Fanshawe Pioneer Village contains a collection of material culture significant to the history of the city of London and Middlesex County. The collection includes over 25,000 artefacts representing furniture, decorative arts, costumes and textiles, archival materials, domestic tools, vehicles as well as agricultural and industrial tools and equipment. The collection has been assembled through donations from residents of London and Middlesex County who have donated their artefacts.

=== Educational events ===
As part of their attempt to encourage community involvement, Fanshawe Pioneer Village hosts a number of historically based events every year.

== Buildings ==
Fanshawe Pioneer Village is the site of 33 historic buildings with origins spanning one hundred years. The Village is separated into four historical clusters to depict the development of the community.

=== Fanshawe Settlement 1820-1850 ===
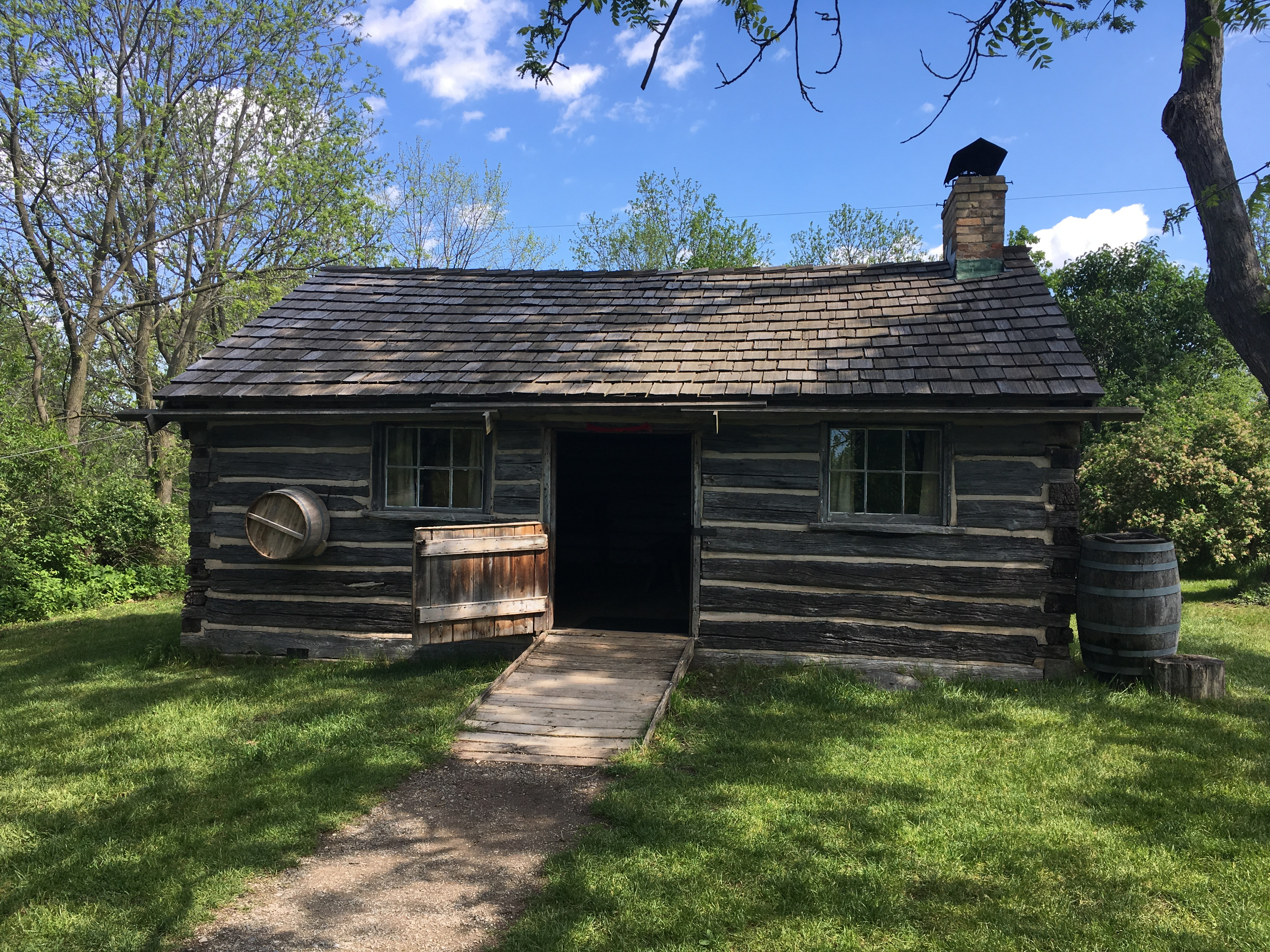
Elgie Log House

Fanshawe Settlement 1820-1850 is intended to be representative of the impact upon the land and aboriginal people by settlers who immigrated from Europe and other parts of North America to the London area in the first half of the 19th century.

- Log School – A replica building reminiscent of the first log schools built by the Talbot settlers on their concession after homes were established. Circa 1830s.
- Elgie Log House -Representative of the first home of the Talbot settlers in London Township, circa 1820.
- Colbert Log Barn - 1840s drive through barn built with rock elm logs.

=== Fanshawe Corners 1850-1880 ===
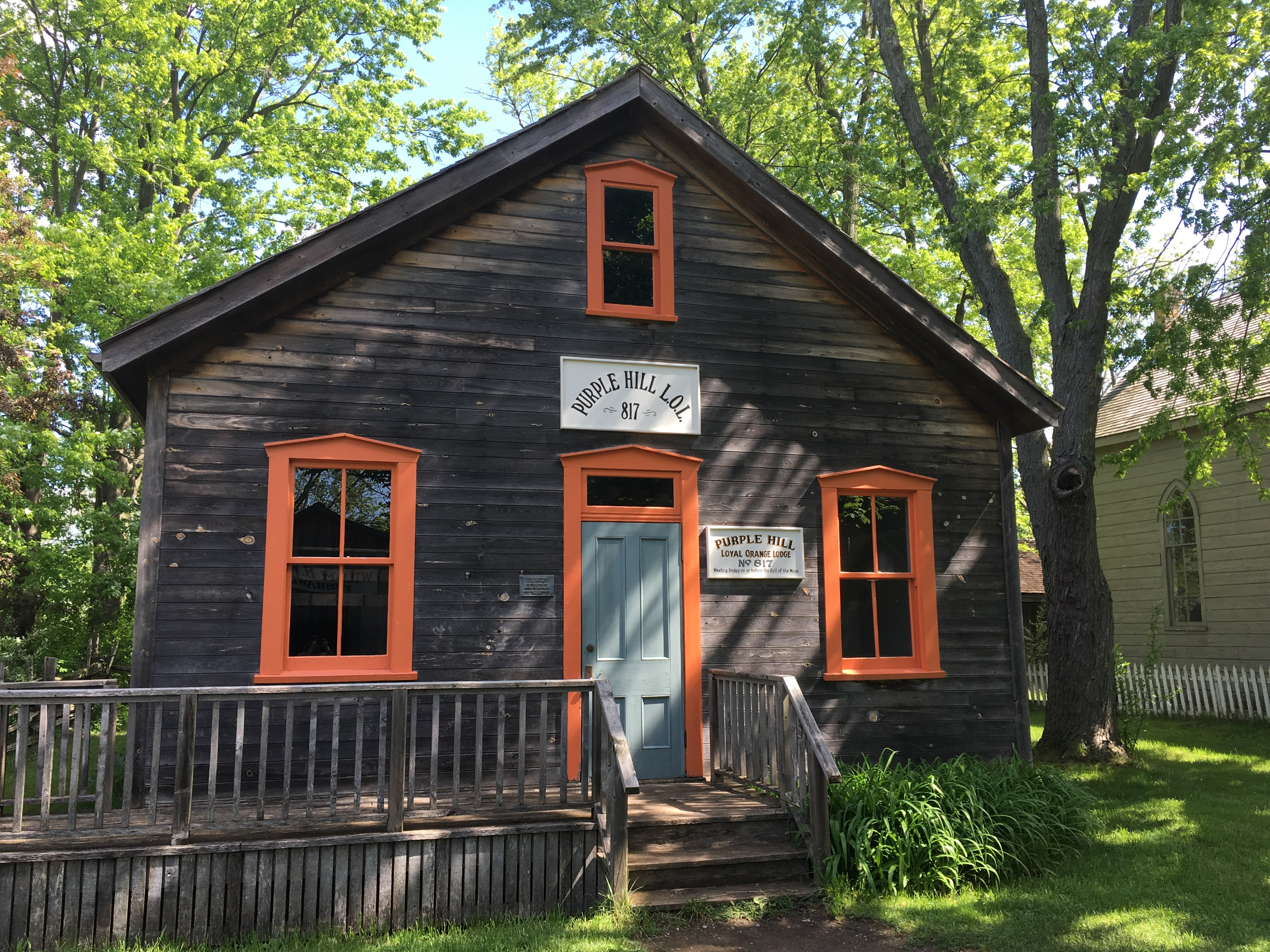
Purple Hill Lodge

Representative of the first stage of urban development at a transportation crossroads.

- African Methodist Episcopal Church- London's first Black-led Church, acted as a community centre and a space of belonging for the growing Black community.
- Blacksmith Shop-Entrepreneurs, like blacksmiths, chose transportation crossroads to establish off-farm businesses.
- Corbett Tavern - An 1840s tavern that provided accommodation, food and stabling for horses to the traveling public and served as the community meeting place.
- Lochaber Church - This Free Presbyterian Church was constructed in 1884.
- Mount Moriah Lodge - Masonic orders held their first meetings in local taverns until purpose built halls like this one could be constructed. The interior is representative of an early 19th-century London Masonic Hall.
- Purple Hill Lodge - Established by the Protestant Irish immigrants who brought Orangeism with them when they came to Canada. Many settled areas in the region of what is now southwestern Ontario built meeting halls for the orange order, including townships in the London district. These buildings were also a focal point for the community, providing a place where settlers could get to know their neighbors through dances, dinners, recitals and concerts.

=== Fanshawe Township 1880-1910 ===
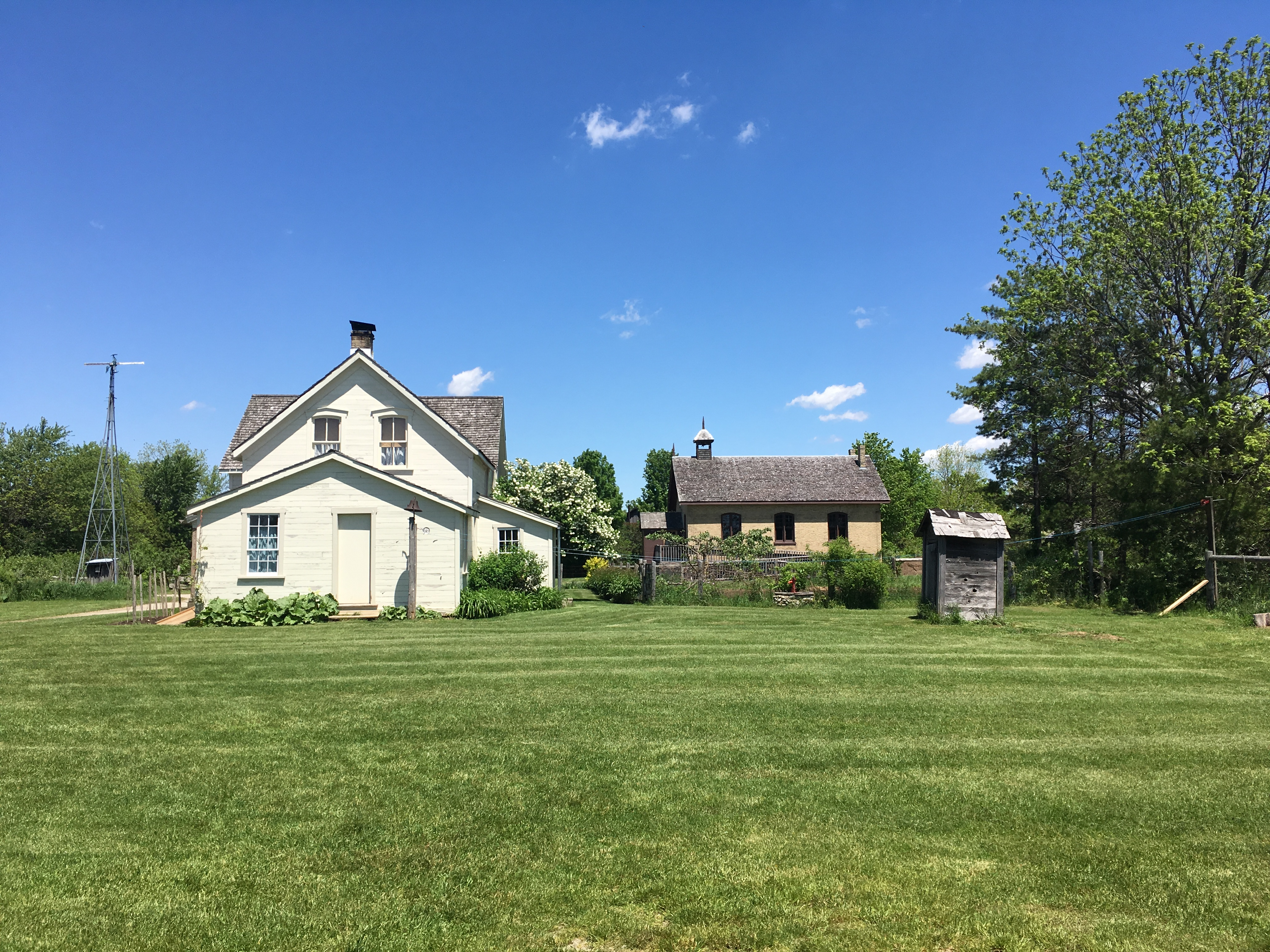
Jury Farmstead

Tells the story of farming, as it becomes the economic engine that drives development in London and Middlesex County.

- The Caverhill Farmstead - The Caverhill Farm represents the established farm of a first generation family after several decades of settlement.
- Fanshawe School - Schools for children of the second generation were formalized by the Province with established curricula and required attendance. Even the architecture was standardized, and this 1871 example of a one-room school house is typical of many in Middlesex County.
- Jury Farmstead - Boyhood home of Wilfrid Jury, the founder of Fanshawe Pioneer Village. The Jury Farmstead is representative of a second generation farm at the turn of the 20th century.

=== The Town of Fanshawe 1910-1920 ===
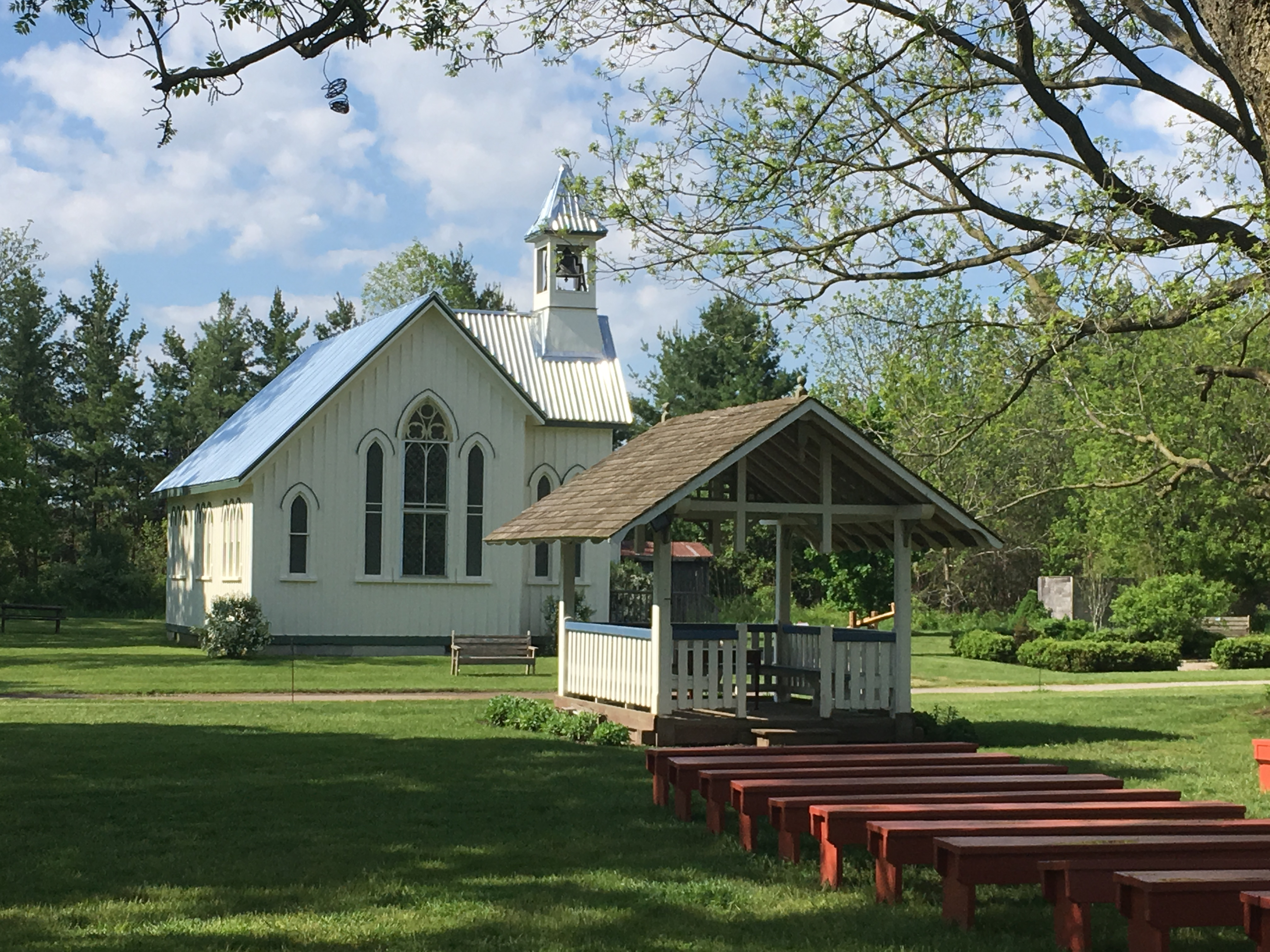
Trinity Anglican Church

Tells the story of the rapid changes that marks the 20th century.

- Alder's Weaving Shed- Thomas Alder's original weaving shed dating from the 1850s.
- Denfield General Store - Here customers could purchase or order any supplies they could not grow or raise themselves, obtain needed credit or communicate with the world through the telegraph, telephone or mail.
- Peel House- Boyhood home of London artist Paul Peel. The building is representative of an urban home at the turn of the 19th century.
- Harmer Sawmill- Sawmills milled lumber for local construction. Frame construction quickly overtook log as the dominant architecture style because of the availability of local mills.
- Dr. Jones House and Barn– This homestead is located on the edge of the Town. While the barns are still in use, the farm land is rented to others, indicating that the owner has another income, that of a rural doctor.
- The Print Shop- Typical turn of the century print shop which produces the London Free Press and Farmers Advocate as well as printed materials made to order.
- Trinity Anglican Church- 1887 Anglican church designated by the Province as an excellent example of carpenter Gothic church architecture.

== See also ==
- Black Creek Pioneer Village
- Kings Landing Historical Settlement
- Upper Canada Village
- Village Québécois d'Antan
- Village Historique Acadien
