= Paul Peel =

Canadian artist

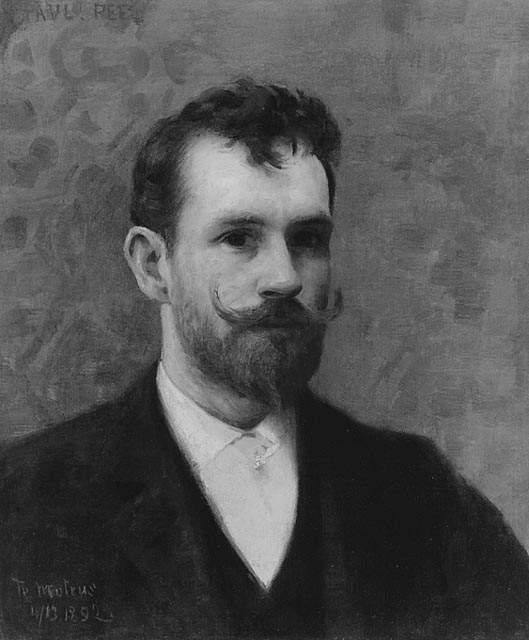
- Self-portrait from the National Gallery of Canada
- Born: November 7, 1860; London, Canada West
- Died: October 3, 1892 (aged 31); Paris, France
- Education: studied with William Lees Judson in London, Ontario; Pennsylvania Academy of the Fine Arts with Thomas Eakins; École des Beaux-Arts with Jean-Léon Gérôme; Académie Julian with Jean-Joseph Benjamin-Constant, Henri Doucet and Jules Lefebvre
- Spouse: Isaure Verdier (m. 1882)

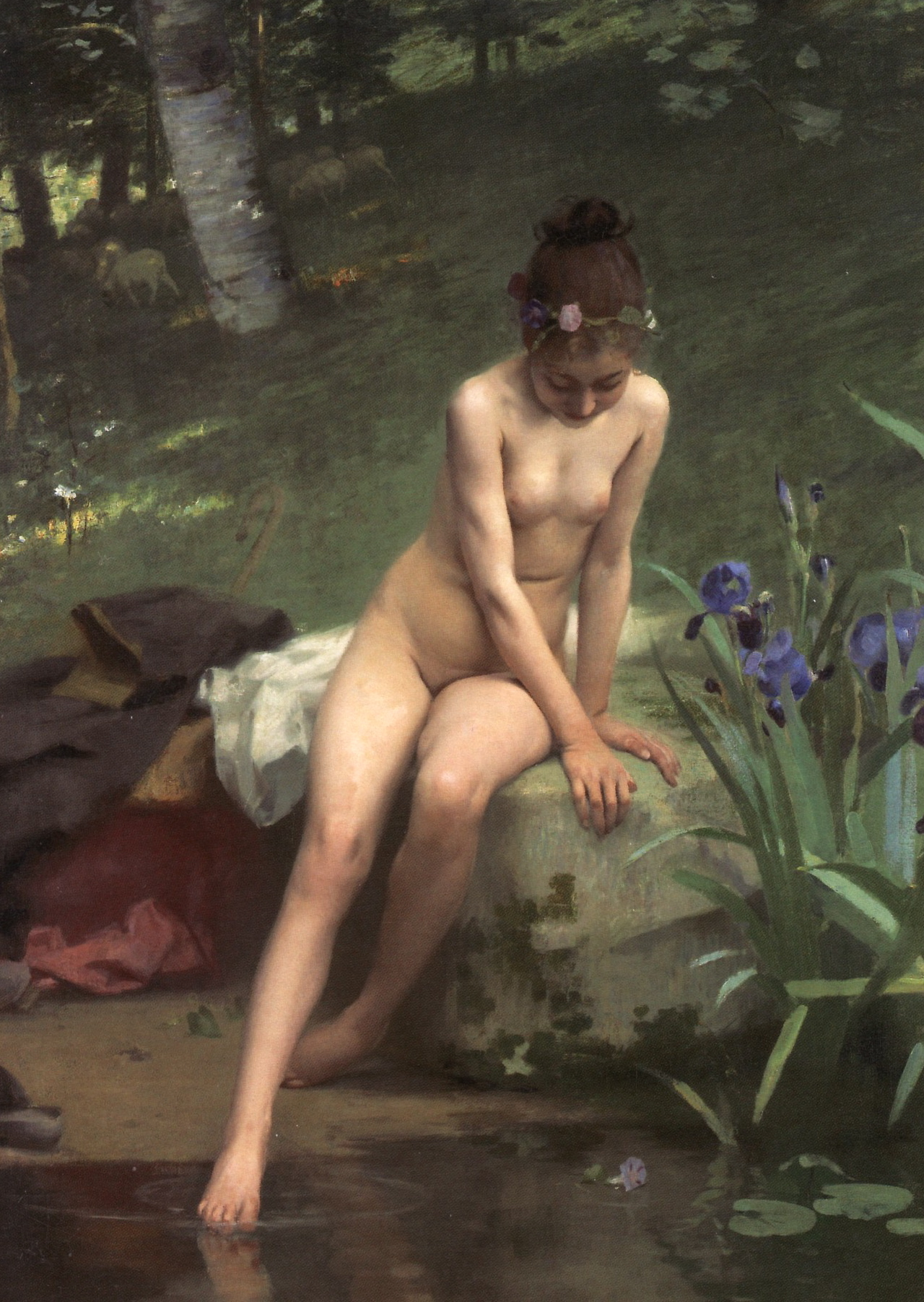
The Little Shepherdess (1892). 160.6 × 114.0 cm. Oil on canvas. Art Gallery of Ontario

Paul Peel (7 November 1860 – 3 October 1892) was a Canadian figure painter. Having won a medal at the 1890 Paris Salon, he became one of the first Canadian artists to receive international recognition in his lifetime.

== Career and life ==
Peel was born in London, Canada West, and received his art training from his father from a young age. His sister Mildred Peel was also an artist. Later he studied with William Lees Judson and at the Pennsylvania Academy of the Fine Arts with Thomas Eakins (1877–1880). Like fellow graduates of the Pennsylvania Academy of Arts and students of Eakins, Paul subscribed to a tonal method of rendering natural light outdoors.

He moved to Paris in 1881, France where he studied at the École nationale supérieure des Arts Decoratifs, later enrolling in the atelier of Jean-Léon Gérôme at the École des Beaux-Arts. It was at the recommendation of Gérôme that he began sketching outdoors.

He studied afterwards with Jean-Joseph Benjamin-Constant in his private atelier and then with him at the Académie Julian as well as with Henri Doucet and Jules Lefebvre (1877–1890). In 1883, he exhibited his first painting at the Paris Salon, where he would continue to exhibit regularly until 1892. His paintings have a conservative quality, but a few later works reveal that he was a convert to Impressionist colour and light.

In 1882, he married Isaure Verdier. They had two children: a son (Robert Andre, in 1886) and a daughter (Emilie Marguerite, in 1888).

Peel travelled widely in Canada and in Europe, exhibiting as a member of the Ontario Society of Artists and the Royal Canadian Academy of Arts. He also exhibited at international shows like the Paris Salon, where he won a bronze medal in 1890 for his painting After the Bath. He was known for his often sentimental nudes and for his pictures of the charm of children. Childhood effectively became the artist's "brand" with the public success of After the Bath. He was also among the first Canadian painters to explore the nude as a subject.

He contracted a lung infection and died in his sleep, in Paris, France, at the age of 31.

His childhood home is one of the many attractions at the Fanshawe Pioneer Village in London, Ontario.

== Major works ==
Listed chronologically:

- Devotion (1881)
- Listening to the Skylark (1884)
- A Country Boy and His Dog Among the Daisies (1886)
- Mother and Child (1888)
- The Young Botanist (1888–1890)
- A Venetian Bather 1889
- Portrait of Gloria Roberts (1889)
- After the Bath (1890)
- The Young Biologist (1891)
- The Little Shepherdess (1892)
- Robert Andre Peel (c. 1892)
- The Modest Model (1889)
- Bennett Jull (1889–1890)

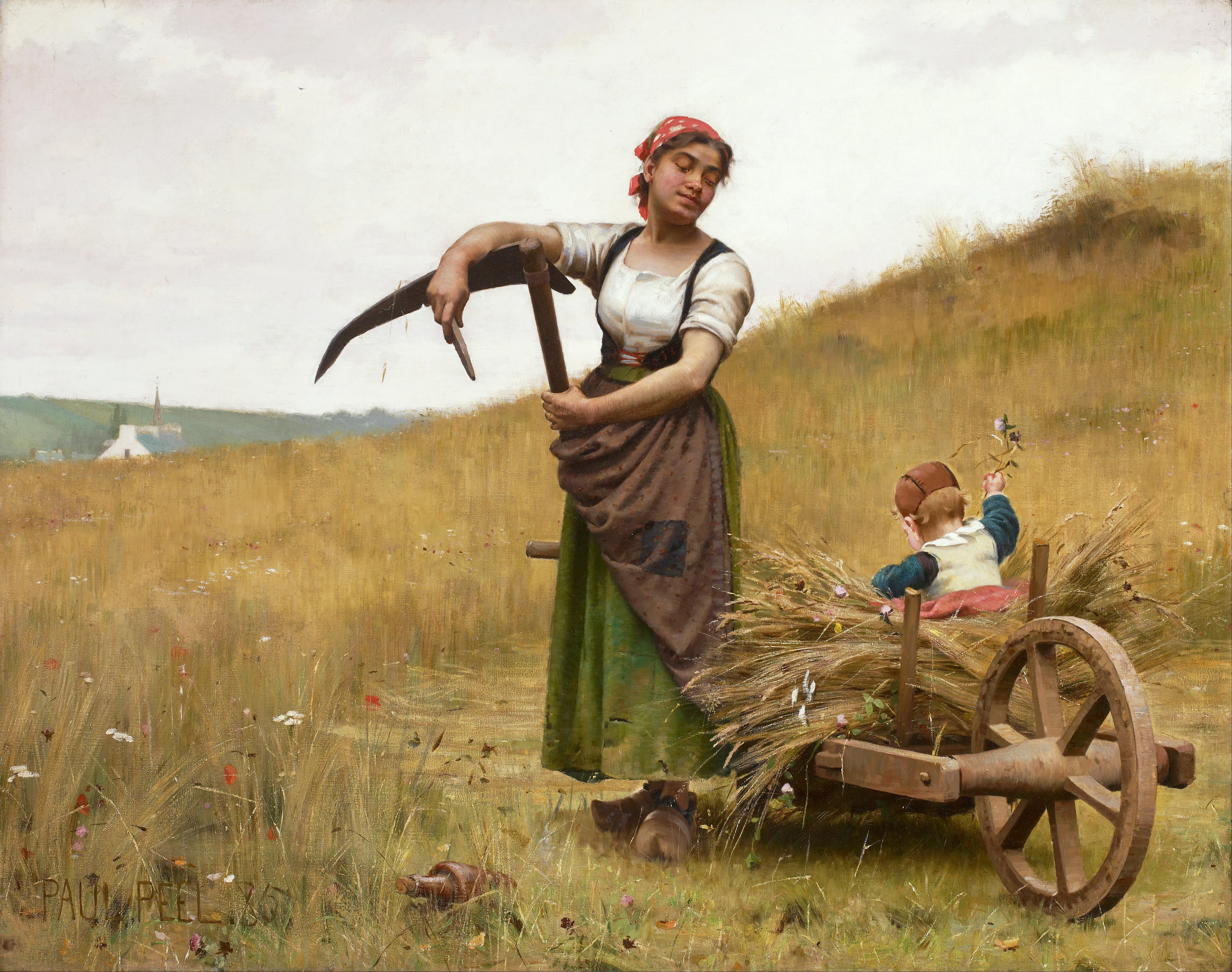
Adoration (1885) by Peel

== Record sale prices ==
At the June 8, 2023, Cowley Abbott auction Artwork from an Important Private Collection - Part II, The Young Gleaner (1888), oil on canvas, 33 x 23.25 ins ( 83.8 x 59.1 cms ), Auction Estimate: $150,000.00 - $200,000.00, realized a price of $408,000.00.
