= Mildred Peel =

Canadian artist (1856–1920)

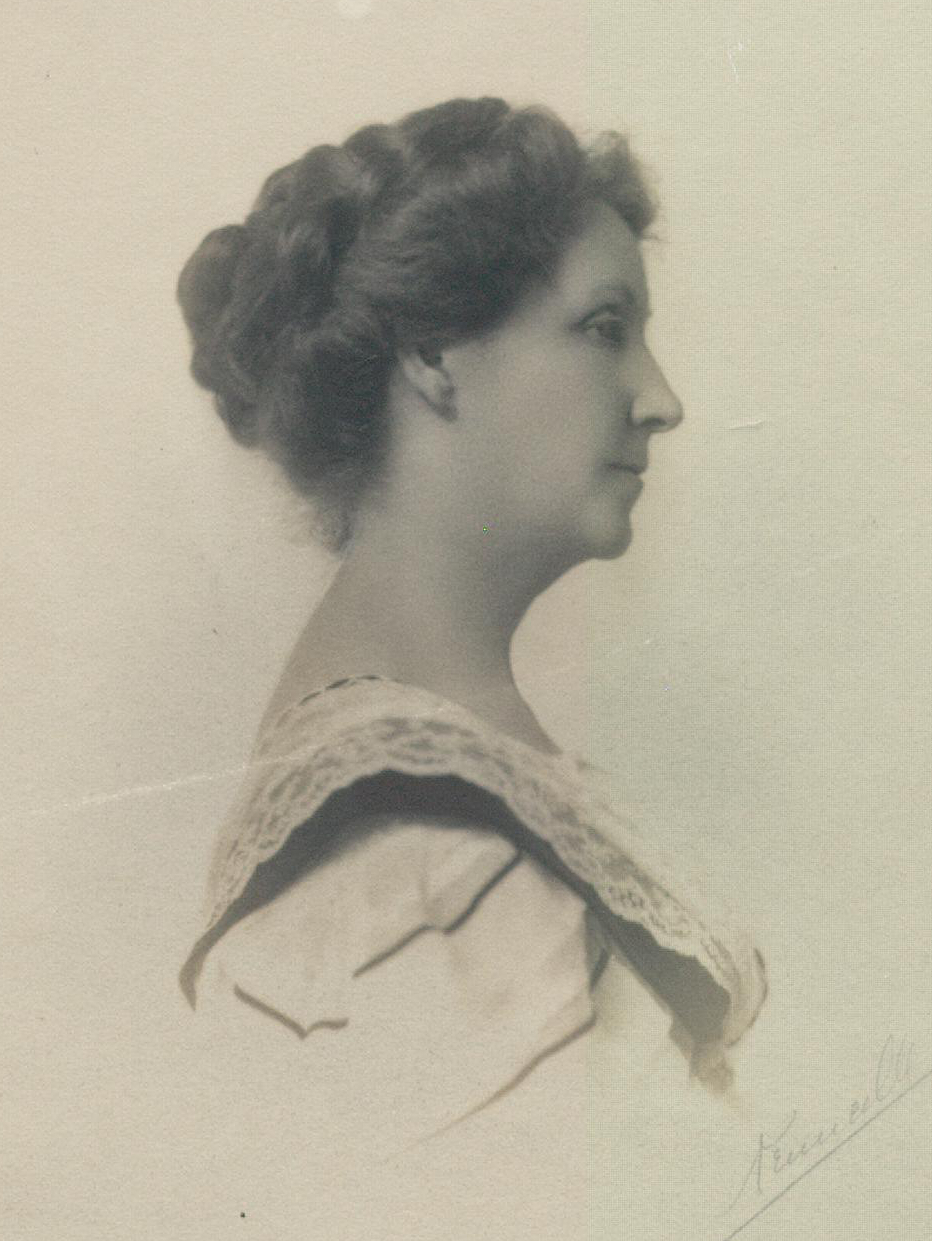
Mildred Peel

Mildred Peel (1856–1920) was a Canadian sculptor and artist. She studied at the Pennsylvania Academy of Fine Arts and the Académie Julian in Paris France in 1886.

Her brother Paul Peel was also an artist, their father, John R. Peel having instructed them both from an early age. Peel became one of the first women in Canada to complete a publicly commissioned sculpture. She painted a portrait of Laura Secord in 1904 which is held in the Government of Ontario Art Collection.

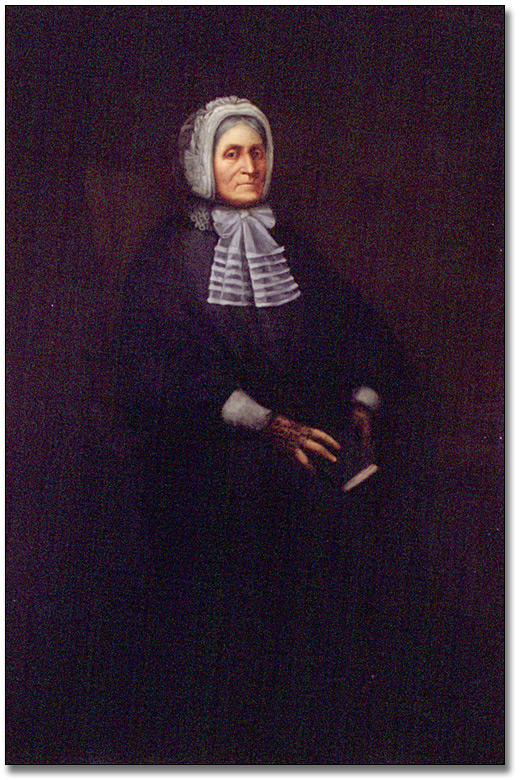
Mildred Peel (1904) Laura Secord

She died in Santa Barbara, California in 1920.
