= Western Libraries =

Academic libraries of the University of Western Ontario

- Location: University of Western Ontario campus, Canada
- Type: Academic library
- Established: 1898
- Branches: 7

Collection
- Items collected: Periodicals, books, microform (microfilm/microfiche), government publications, maps, university archives, manuscripts, sheet music
- Size: 5.9 million items

Access and use
- Access requirements: Student and staff of the University of Western Ontario, other Canadian university staff/students registered within the interlibrary loan system

Other information
- Budget: CA$31,100,000
- Director: Geoffrey Robert Little (Chief Librarian)
- Website: Website

Western Libraries is the library system of the University of Western Ontario in London, Ontario. Western Libraries has 7 locations across campus: The D.B. Weldon Library (Arts and Humanities, Social Science, Information and Media Studies), which also provides access to the Archives and Research Collections Centre, the Allyn and Betty Taylor Library (Engineering, Science, Health Sciences, and the Schulich School of Medicine and Dentistry), the C.B. “Bud” Johnston Library (Business), the John and Dotsa Bitove Family Law Library, the Music Library, and the Education Resource Centre.

== Early Years (1878-1934) ==
For the first forty years of Western University existence (1878–1918) library needs were met for students by either the London Public Library or the Library of Huron College, Western's founding College.

In 1898, the university Senate appointed James Waddell Tupper as the University of Western Ontario's first University Librarian, Senate policy at the time dictating that the Professor of English be appointed University Librarian. Tupper was followed as University Librarian by Dr. N. McL. Trenholme (1900–1901).

William F. Tamblyn was the first University Librarian with any significant tenure, spending 17 years as the University Librarian, from 1901 to 1918. During this time library collections were modest, with London Public Library filling the gap by purchasing books in the Humanities. In 1908, when the university became non-denominational the library had 200 books and an annual budget of $150 for purchases. By 1917 there were barely 3000 books in the library, although the budget had grown to $1200.

In 1918, John Davis Barnett donated over 40,000 books from his personal library to Western. A donation of this size required a change in library oversight to manage such a large collection. Marjorie Ross, Western President Edward Ernest Braithwaite's secretary, was sent to the University of Toronto for training at the library school, and on her return became the first full-time trained Librarian on staff. She was the Arts Librarian with some responsibilities for the libraries of the Medical School and the Institute of Public Health.

The first Western Libraries location opened on campus in 1924, when the holdings of what was then known as the Arts or General Library, which had been held in various locations around London, were brought together in the former Arts and Administration Building, now known as University College.

With library collections and services expanding, Fred Landon was appointed Director of Library Services in 1923 to coordinate the evolving library system. The title Director of Library Services was introduced to distinguish Landon from the role of Marjorie Ross. Following the resignation of Ross in 1926, Landon began using the title University Librarian.

== Lawson Memorial Library (1934-1972) ==
Superseded by The D.B. Weldon Library

During Fred Landon's tenure as University Librarian, library operations and collections continued expanding. By 1931 the collection held over 100,000 volumes. Landon oversaw the planning, building and opening of the first purpose-built library on campus. Lawson Memorial Library opened September 28, 1934 having cost $135K to build, the equivalent of $3M dollars in 2025.

The Lawson Library was considered a general library, in the sense that its holdings supported students studying general versus professional subjects; as professional programs were established at Western, dedicated reading rooms and libraries were developed with collections to support learning in these specialized areas. Lawson Library was also home to staff providing centralized support to divisional/professional libraries; for example acquisitions activities (buying and receiving books) were conducted by Lawson staff, as well as some cataloguing.

Lawson Memorial Library was named in memory of Frank and Lorena Lawson whose son and daughter, the Honourable Ray Lawson and Mrs. Duncan McArthur, contributed to the cost. Lawson Library, as it was generally called, was expanded with a north wing addition in 1954, and a south wing addition in 1962.

As Western grew both in number of students and programs offered, it became necessary to expand the general library to such a degree that a new main campus library was recommended in 1964, this would become known as The D.B. Weldon Library.

The Lawson Library became known as the Lawson Memorial Building after the library vacated the space in 1972; it was eventually joined to Stevenson Hall and used for administrative purposes. As of 2024, Lawson Hall, as it is now known, is home to Special Constables, the Departments of History, English and Writing Studies, Classical Studies and the Department of Women's Studies and Feminist Research.

== Medical Library (1900-1965) ==
Superseded by the Health Sciences Library

The Medical Library at Western began as a room on the second floor of the Medical School at York and Waterloo streets around 1900. It wasn't until 1916 that a Librarian was hired to oversee the collection. With the construction of a new Medical School building on Ottaway Avenue (now South Street) the library moved to this location and moved once again in 1965 to the new Health Sciences Centre on main campus, when it officially became known as the Health Sciences Library. The Health Sciences Library would eventually become the Allyn and Betty Taylor Library, merging with the Natural Sciences Library, Sciences Library, and Engineering Library.

During the tenure of Fred Landon, University Librarian from 1923 to 1947, the Medical School Library at the Ottaway Avenue location held a collection of over 20K volumes and underwent some minor space improvements (enhanced lighting, increased seating).

== The D.B. Weldon Library ==
Previously the Lawson Library (1934-1972)

The D. B. Weldon Library (commonly shortened to "Weldon") is the largest academic library on the University of Western Ontario campus in London, Ontario, Canada, and one of the largest academic libraries in the country.

=== History ===
By 1964 plans to build a larger library to replace the Lawson Library were underway. Construction of Weldon commenced in fall 1968 and the library was partially occupied by fall of 1970, opening for operation on June 1, 1972. It cost $8M to build, provided over 224,000 square feet of floor space, had room for more than 1,000,000 volumes, and included 2,000 study spaces.

In addition to assuming the collection from the Lawson Library, covering subjects not held in other divisional/professional libraries such as Arts & Humanities and Social Science, Weldon housed departments providing central services to divisional/professional libraries such as accounting, personnel, and systems support. Along with standard library services such as collections, reference, and circulation, it also delivered specialized services in Government Publications, Special Collections, and the Regional Collection.

The library is named after Colonel Douglas Black Weldon, who fought in the First World War and commanded the London Regiment of the Royal Highland Fusiliers of Canada during the Second World War. He served on the university's Board of Governors from 1946 to 1967, and his son David Black Weldon was Chancellor of the university from 1984 to 1988. The family of Colonel Weldon, including son David and daughters Marsha and Ann, made a generous gift to assist with the building of the library. The library of the Royal Canadian Regiment Museum in London is also named after him.

=== Architecture ===
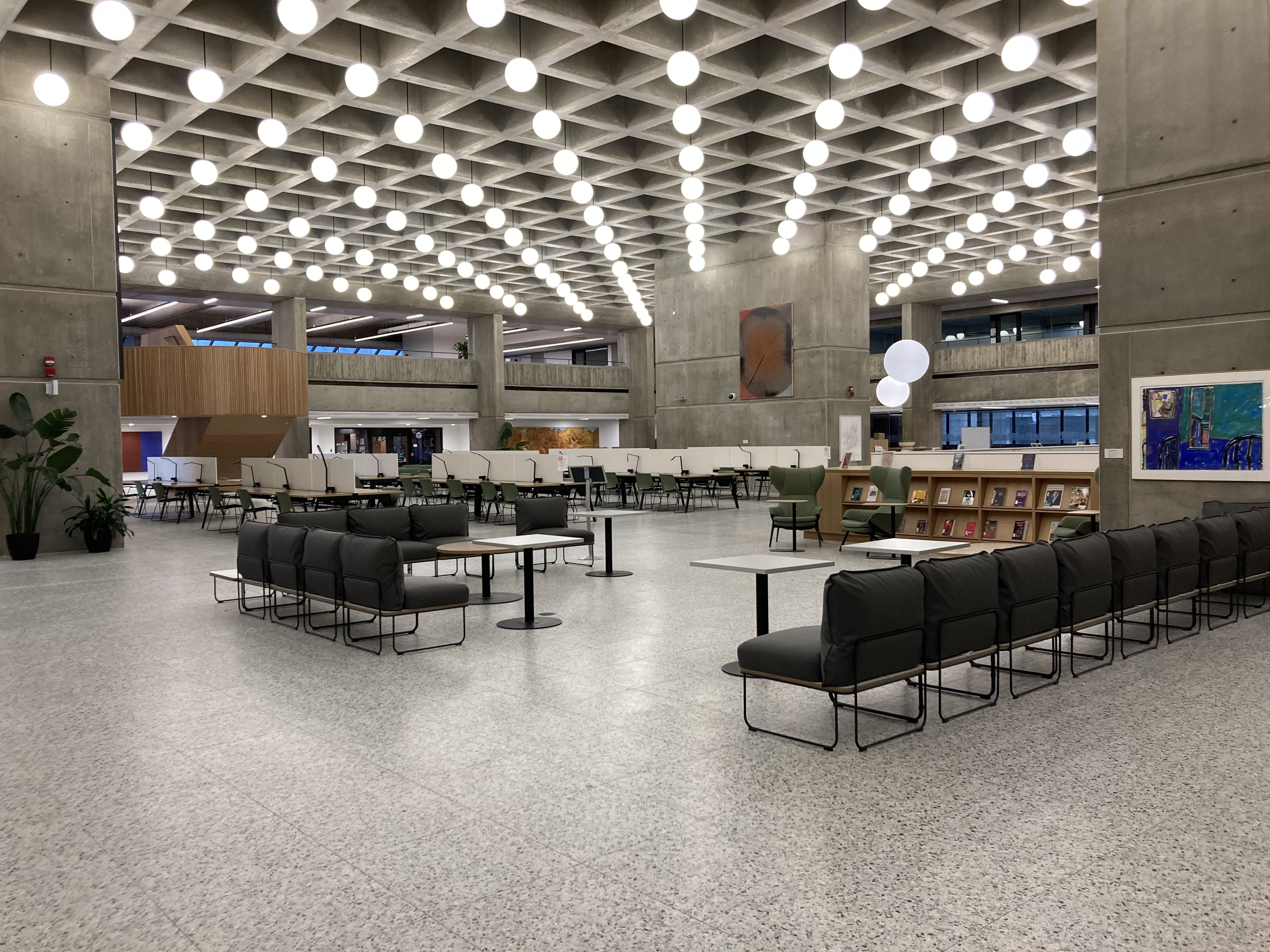
Interior of Weldon Library after revitilization project renovations

The building itself is "modernist" and "angular", an example of the "new, sharply-planed brutalism" typical of buildings constructed on campus during the 1960s. Construction broke ground in 1968 and opened on June 1, 1972. It was a joint design by architects Ronald E. Murphy and John Andrews. Murphy designed other buildings on Western's campus including Middlesex College, Alumni Hall and Spencer Engineering Building.

It underwent renovations in 1997–1998, 2006–2007, and 2008–2011.

In January 2023, the library was redesigned by architecture firm Perkins&Will and opened following a $15 million renovation.

=== Collections ===
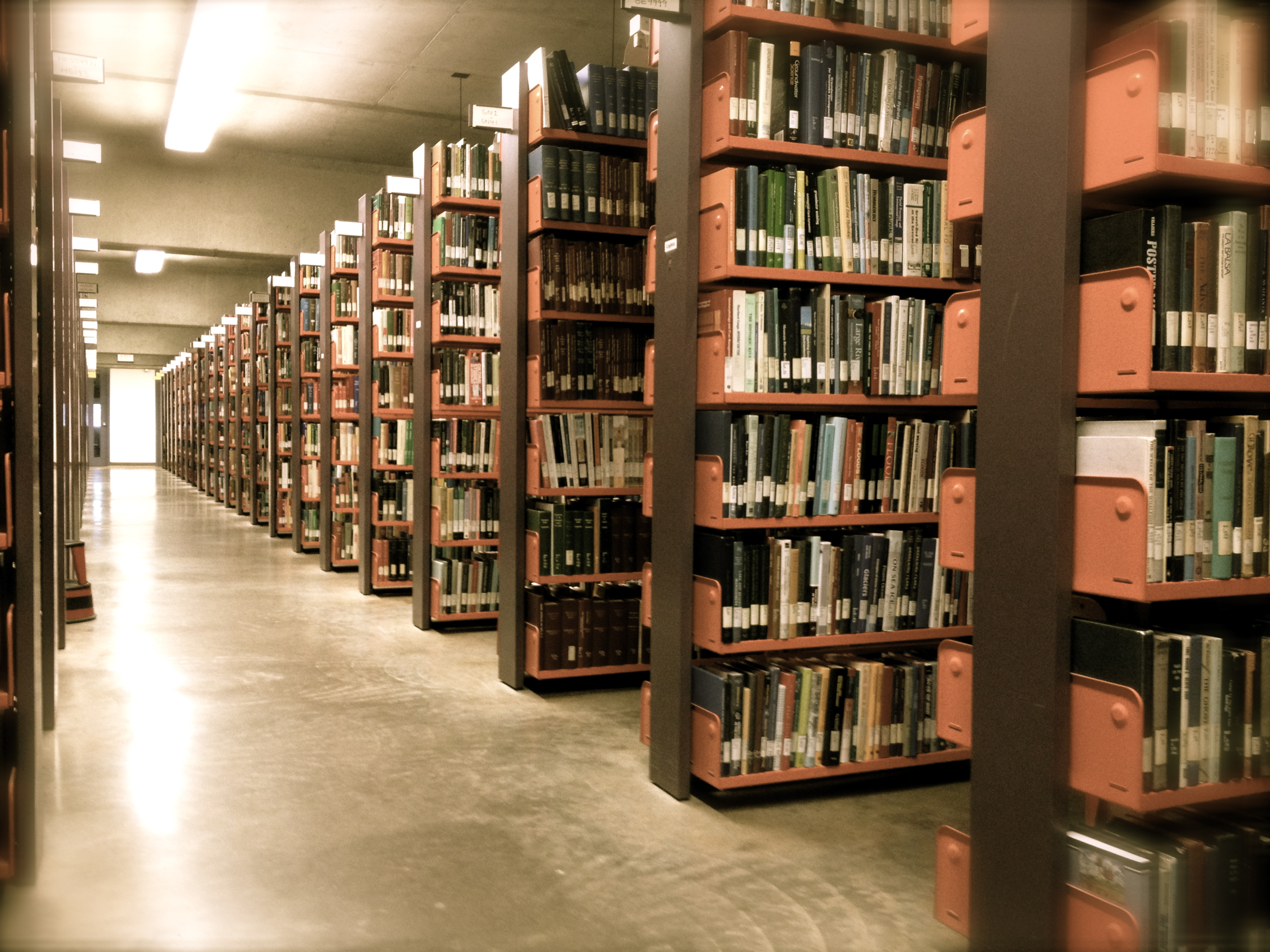
Stacks at the Weldon Library

Weldon Library serves the faculties of Arts & Humanities, Information & Media Studies and Social Science. Highlights of the collection include materials in the Government Publications Research Collection and an extensive collection of research materials on microfilm and microfiche.

Western Libraries, including Weldon Library, has a collection of approximately 5.9 million items.

=== Pride Library ===
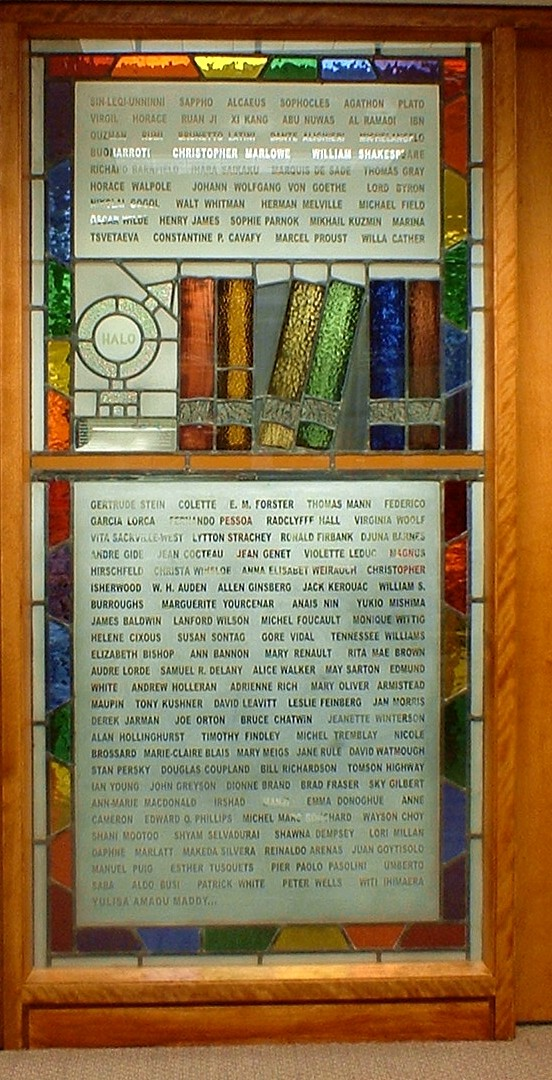
Stained-glass window at the Pride Library, Artist: Lynette Richards.

The Pride Library is a collection of over 6,000 books, periodicals, and audio-visual resources by and about LGBT people housed within the D.B. Weldon Library. The library is the first official queer resource centre at a Canadian university. Since its founding in the Faculty of Arts in the late 1990s, The Pride Library has grown with the support of donors, volunteers, faculty, and administrators.

Subjects include the gay liberation movement, gay and lesbian literary history, coming out, women's health and safety, homophobia, bisexuality, trans life, pornography, censorship, and same-sex marriage. Also included in the collection are early sexology works, homophobic classics, and queer pulps from the 1950s and 1960s.

The Pride Library was founded by Professor James Miller in his office in 1997. In the summer of 2005, it was relocated on the main floor of the Weldon Library and officially reopened on February 14, 2006. A donation of $50,000 from the university administration in the spring of 2006 covered the renovation of the new space and the conversion of the catalogued books into a circulating collection.

==== Stained glass window ====
The front of the Pride Library is decorated with a stained-glass window. The window celebrates and commemorates 135 influential gay and lesbian authors. It was designed and constructed by London, Ontario artist Lynette Richards and consists of the Pride Library logo amid a list of some of history's most influential queer authors. The Pride Library logo contains a series of shelved books, coloured with the spectrum of the rainbow, supported by the logo of the now-disbanded Homophile Association of London Ontario (HALO), which has made significant contributions to the Pride Library.

== Allyn and Betty Taylor Library ==
Previously the Sciences Library (1982-1991), Natural Sciences Library (1966-1982), Health Sciences Library (1965-1982) and Engineering Library (1959-2001)

The Allyn and Betty Taylor Library is the second-largest academic library on the University of Western Ontario campus. It serves the faculties of Engineering, Science, Health Sciences and the Schulich School of Medicine & Dentistry.

=== History ===
A Sciences Library facility was approved in 1988 by the Steering Committee for the Western Science Centre and was constructed adjacent to the existing Natural Sciences library stacks and main floor reading room, resulting in a 66,000 square foot library space.

The Allyn and Betty Taylor Library was officially opened on November 22, 1991, with the design and construction of the new library funded through the Renaissance Campaign (1989 –1994). At the time of the Library's opening, Allyn Taylor (Western's Chancellor from 1976 to 1980) was quoted as saying: "My long association with Western is very close to my heart. Betty and I are proud and thankful indeed to have our names linked with this fine, new library, and can only say how grateful we are to the anonymous benefactor responsible." The $11.8 million three-floor addition to the north side of the Natural Sciences Building had a total seating capacity of 1,000 in 1991.

The opening of The Allyn and Taylor Library brought together the holdings of the former Natural Sciences Library and Health Sciences Library into one physical location. Until this time services had been centralized but collections divided across two physical sites. In 1997, Engineering collections were also merged into the Taylor Library, and in 2001 all library services for Engineering were moved to Taylor.

==== Health Sciences Library (1965-1982) ====
The Medical Library at Western began as a room on the second floor of the Medical School at York and Waterloo streets around 1900. It wasn't until 1916 that a Librarian was hired to oversee the collection. With the construction of a new Medical School building on Ottaway Avenue (now South Street) the library moved to this location and moved once again in 1965 to the new Health Sciences Centre on main campus.

On July 1, 1965, the Medical Library became officially known as the Health Sciences Library, reflecting the addition of collections for the Faculty of Dentistry.

The Kresge School of Nursing opened a reading room on main campus in 1961 which was administered by general library (i.e. Lawson) staff until 1966, when oversight of the collection was transferred to the Health Sciences Library. The Nursing Reading Room closed and its collections fully integrated into the Health Sciences Library in 1970.

The Health Sciences Library was expanded in 1975 to provide additional space for collections and staff, including improvements to public service areas.

In 1982 the Natural Sciences and Health Sciences Libraries amalgamated services, however both physical locations remained open, operating under one name: The Sciences Library.

==== Natural Sciences Library (1966-1982) ====
Due to a lack of space in the Lawson Library, in 1947 it became necessary to open a Science reading room in the former Natural Sciences Building, now the Physics and Astronomy Building. Additional reading rooms were opened in 1958-59 for Biological and Geological Sciences (held in Middlesex College) and Physics, Chemistry, (held in the former Natural Sciences Building, now Physics and Astronomy Building) and Engineering (held in the Engineering Science building).

In 1966, the Natural Sciences Library was opened in the new Natural Sciences Centre, amalgamating these Reading Room collections and Science materials from Lawson into one Library, except for the Engineering collection, which remained housed in the Engineering Building as a separate Library.

An expansion to the Natural Sciences Library that doubled the seating capacity and increased collections space by 50% opened in 1973.

In 1982 the Natural Sciences and Health Sciences Libraries amalgamated services, however both physical locations remained open, operating under one name: The Sciences Library.

==== Sciences Library (1982-1991) ====
In 1982 the Natural Sciences and Health Sciences Libraries amalgamated services and began operating under one name, the Sciences Library, however both physical locations remained open to provide access to their respective collections.

==== Engineering Library (1959-2001) ====
The Engineering Library opened in 1959 in the Engineering Building, and remained open until 1997, when the collection was consolidated into the Allyn and Betty Taylor Library. An Engineering Resource Centre with a focus on undergraduate support was resident in the Engineering Building until it ceased operations in 2001, when all library support for the Faculty moved to Taylor Library.

=== Layout ===
The main floor (M) contains the Info Desk, study rooms, as well as many large study tables, and is considered a conversation-friendly learning zone. The two lower floors, Ground (G), and Lower Ground (LG) contain upwards of one hundred study cubicles for focused, individual work, and is considered a silent learning zone. There are six floors (S1-S6) known collectively as the stacks which house the majority of the general print collection, which has an emphasis on Engineering, Sciences, Technology, Health Sciences, Medicine and Dentistry topics.

=== Study Spaces ===
Collaborative learning spaces are ideal for preparing presentations, assignments, reciting presentations or studying independently. All areas are AODA compliant. Media Rooms and Media Tables are bookable by the Western community and are equipped with various techniques to facilitate collaboration, including multi-view display screens, adaptors, and projectors.

== Archives and Research Collections Centre ==
The Archives and Research Collections Centre (ARCC), attached to The D.B. Weldon Library, opened for service delivery in October 2003 with an official opening following in April 2004. The ARCC includes a public reading room, staff workspace, special collections space, and high-density storage for approximately 1.6 million volumes.

== C.B. "Bud" Johnston Library (Business) ==
Previously known as The Business Library (1957-2007)

=== History ===
A reading room for the newly established School of Business Administration was created off-campus at Goodholme (north end of Waterloo Street) in 1950. The reading room moved on campus to the new School of Business Administration building in 1957, and by 1961-62 a full-fledged Library was open. When the building was expanded in 1967, library reading room space doubled.

In 2007 the Business Library was named in honour of C.B. “Bud” Johnston, former Dean of the business school from 1978 to 1989. Johnston died in 2003; donations received in his honour were used to enhance digital access to business information sources and provide technological and facility upgrades to the library space.

The C.B. “Bud” Johnston Library was re-located to the new Ivey School of Business Building on Western Road in 2013.

== Education Resource Centre ==
Previously known as The Education Library (1965-2019)

=== History ===
The Education Library began operation in September 1965 at London Teacher's College, awaiting the completion of Althouse College, which would provide education for future secondary school teachers. In 1966 it was relocated to the most unique architectural feature of Althouse College: a circular library, dubbed by many at the time as the flying saucer.

In 1971 the Education Library assumed responsibility for an audio-visual centre opened in Althouse as a depository for all audio-visual resources in the college. The centre developed into a Library Resource Centre holding films, slides, records, tapes, kits and games, among other teaching aids.

In late 1975, the Education Library assumed the collections of London Teacher's College, as elementary school teacher training provided by the London Teacher's College was amalgamated with Althouse College, whose sole focus until this time had been training secondary school teachers.

In 2019, due to changes in teacher training and a move to virtual graduate programs by the Faculty, the Education Library was moved to room 1135 in Althouse College and renamed the Education Resource Centre. At this time part of the collection was transferred to Weldon Library, with a small collection of materials supporting teacher education, including kits and games, remaining on-site.

The Office of Indigenous Initiatives assumed the Education Library space in 2019, including the flying saucer, developing it into a beautiful Indigenous Learning Centre / Wampum Learning Lodge which was officially opened in 2022.

== John and Dotsa Bitove Family Law Library ==
Previously known as The Law Library (1959-1994)

=== History ===
The Law Library was established in 1959 alongside the Faculty of Law, opening in its current location in the Josephine Spencer Niblett Law Building in 1961.

In 1968 the Library doubled in size owing to a major addition to the Law building, increasing reading, stacking, and staff work space.

In 1994 the Law Library was once again expanded through an addition which included shelving for collections and more student study space. At this time, the library was renamed the John and Dotsa Bitove Family Law Library in recognition of their generosity to the Renaissance Campaign.

== Music Library ==
The Music Library is situated in Talbot College, its primary users are associated with the Don Wright Faculty of Music. As of 2008, the library possessed 67,471 scores, 25,600 LPs, 26,000 CDs, 31,460 books, 11,610 microforms (fiche, film and microcards), 2,600 rare books, scores, and libretti, 600 current periodicals and 402 videos.

=== History ===
The Music Library was initially established in 1962 as an off-campus reading room located in the A.E. Silverwood Building, previously known as Goodholme, home of the School of Business Administration. By 1963 it was considered a full-fledged library. Of note, the Music Library at Western is considered unusual in that it has always collected books about music as well as actual music (i.e. scores). The Choral, Band, Orchestral collection of musical scores continues to support the Faculty music performance program today.

The Music Library moved to a temporary on-campus portable building in 1970 and to it is current location. on the second floor of Talbot College, in 1972. In addition to housing physical collections the Library included a student study area and Rare Book / seminar room that was named the Gustav Mahler / Alfred Rose Room in 1973. This was in honour of Gustav Mahler (1860–1911), the Austrian composer, and his nephew, Alfred Rose, who had taught music at Western since 1947 and had recently retired.

In 1981, due to space constraints, the Music Library expanded into a vacant space north of the Talbot College cafeteria on the main floor. The space was necessary to provide suitable storage for the Mahler/Rose collection. In addition, the Choral, Band, Orchestral collection was moved to room 134, adjacent the cafeteria.

In 2018-19 the holdings of the Mahler/Rose collection were relocated to the Archives and Research Collections Centre, a facility with the necessary environmental conditions for storing these special and rare materials.
