= Sustainable Archaeology =

- Abbreviation: SA
- Formation: 2009
- Purpose: Digital Archaeological Research Facility and Repository
- Location(s): London, Ontario and Hamilton, Ontario
- Region served: Canada
- Parent organization: University of Western Ontario and McMaster University
- Website: http://sustainablearchaeology.org/

Sustainable Archaeology (SA) is a digital archaeological research facility and collections repository that advances a sustainable form of practice and research archaeology in Ontario. Sustainable Archaeology is an inter-institutional collaborative research facility between the University of Western Ontario (Western) and McMaster University.

Sustainable Archaeology's research facilities are located in London, Ontario, and Hamilton, Ontario.

Sustainable Archaeology is funded by the Canadian Foundation for Innovation (CFI) and the Ontario Ministry of Research and Innovation Ontario Research Fund (ORF).

Sustainable Archaeology consolidates archaeological collections from across Ontario digitally into the Informational Platform, a web-based database and research interface, bringing together thousands of collections generated through research and commercial or cultural resource management (CRM) archaeology in Ontario. Collections are held in-trust by Sustainable Archaeology for the people of Ontario. The consolidation of data and collections facilitates collaborative research between divergent fields of archaeological study, and access to both recent and previously excavated archaeological materials. Artifacts, field records, contextual datasets, and reporting are converted into digital information and 3D images and integrated into the Informational Platform, a web-based research oriented database system.

== Background ==
Since the 1970s, provincial legislation in Ontario has mandated that lands projected for development must first be assessed for evidence of cultural heritage, including archaeological sites. As a result, the number of archaeological sites identified and excavated in the province, and the amount of data and collections amassed, has grown steadily over the past several decades. Today, 80-90% of archaeological practice in Ontario is conducted as commercial-based fieldwork, undertaken on behalf of the public and private sector by cultural resource management (CRM) companies. The collection of archaeological artifacts from licensed excavations has exceeded storage capabilities in Ontario. Collections have remained largely inaccessible to researchers, students, and local and Descendant communities. This "crisis" in curation reflects broader trends in the management of archaeological collections internationally.

=== Project Development ===
In 2009 Dr. Neal Ferris of the University of Western Ontario was awarded a $9.8 million grant from the Canadian Foundation for Innovation (CFI) and the Ontario Ministry of Research and Innovation. The grant was awarded for the collaborative initiative between University of Western Ontario under Dr. Ferris as the Principal Investigator, and McMaster University, under Principal Investigator Dr. Aubrey Cannon to establish a research and digital data cooperative and physical repository for collections. Construction of the Western facility in London, Ontario began in the fall of 2010. The London facility is located off-campus, adjacent to the Museum of Ontario Archaeology. The McMaster facility was constructed off-campus in a renovated space at McMaster Innovation Park in Hamilton, Ontario.

Construction at the Western facility was completed in the fall of 2011. Renovations at the McMaster facility at McMaster Innovation Park were completed in 2012.

== Mission statement ==
Sustainable Archaeology operates under the following mission statement:

"Sustainable Archaeology is dedicated to advancing a transformative practice of archaeology that integrates the many forms of the discipline – commercial, academic, avocational – by consolidating the extensively recovered archaeological record from Ontario and converting that material and contextual data into broadly accessible digital information, to allow for ongoing and innovative research that engages with this compiled and rich archaeological heritage left by the countless previous generations of those who loved, lived, and died in this place, and by all those today who draw connections, meaning, value, and identity from the human heritage of this place."

== Informational Platform ==
The Sustainable Archaeology Informational Platform is a web-based research oriented database system that incorporates a range of diverse data sets, including direct access to raw artifact data. The database serves as means of digital curation for site reports, maps and site plans, geospatial data, photographs, and other datasets generated by archaeological studies and excavations in Ontario, and linked to collections held physically at the two facilities. The Informational Platform incorporates value added studies completed at the Sustainable Archaeology facilities, including macro and microscopic analyses, and digital imaging. The Informational Platform is informed by both archaeological and descendant community cultural values.

== Sustainable Archaeology at the University of Western Ontario ==
Laboratories and specialist equipment at Sustainable Archaeology at the University of Western Ontario focuses on digital imaging, and the construction of virtual environments.

=== Ancient Images Laboratory and 3D Scanning ===
The Ancient Images Laboratory is equipped with a Nikon Metrology microtomography (microCT) scanner, a Faxitron digital x-ray, a 3D Systems Projet 660 Pro3D printer, and artifact photography stations. The microCT and digital x-ray are used to conduct non-invasive studies of a range of archaeological and bioarchaeological materials, to facilitate the study of internal structures and features. Sustainable Archaeology's 3D scanning equipment consists of five 3D scanners: a Konica Minolta Vivid 9i, and four structured-light 3D scanners from 3D3 Solutions. Imaging data and 3D scans produced at Sustainable Archaeology are integrated into the database and research platform, and are used to re-construct virtual archaeological environments.

=== Geophysical Unit ===
Sustainable Archaeology's geophysical equipment includes a GSSI 400Mhz ground penetrating radar (GPR), a Geoscan RM15-D resistance meter, and a Bartington Grad601 Fluxgate magnetic gradiometer.

=== Collections Repository ===
The Western facility's repository has a capacity for over 54,000 boxes of archaeological material. It is equipped with high density mobile shelving units that maximize storage capacity. Preventive conservation methods are utilized, including temperature and humidity monitoring, to maintain a stable environment and to ensure long-term viability of collections. Collections are housed in archival quality, acid-free, non-off-gassing polyethylene bags and vials, within corrugated polypropylene "bankers" style boxes. A radio frequency identification system (RFID) is utilized to track the location of boxes both within and between the Western and McMaster facilities in real time. 2-dimensional data matrix (DM) barcodes are utilized for a variety of tracking purposes, including cataloging artifacts, as well as identifying artifact storage boxes, and shelf locations within the repositories.

Sustainable Archaeology's repositories at both Western and McMaster model practices for the management of archaeological collections established by international archaeological repositories, particularly in the United States. Practices for artifact care and handling, including cleaning and packaging for long term storage practiced by Sustainable Archaeology reflect conservation and management strategies for developed by international repositories and artifact conservation bodies.

== Sustainable Archaeology at McMaster ==
Laboratories and specialist equipment at Sustainable Archaeology at McMaster University focus on materials analysis, including petrographic, biogeochemical, zooarchaeological and geoarchaeological studies.

=== Processing Laboratory ===
The Processing Laboratory incorporates equipment for the processing of archaeological materials for cataloguing, accessioning and analytical purposes. Analytical methods employed include sectioning and polishing of hard biological tissues, including animal bones, teeth and shell, and of non-organic materials, such as ceramics and lithics, as well as micro-drilling and milling to facilitate light stable isotope and trace elemental analysis. Equipment in the processing laboratory includes a manual grinder polisher (Buehler Metaserv 250), vacuum mounting (Buehler Cast N' Vac 1000), Buehler IsoMet 1000 Precision Saw and a Minimo high precision rotary tool for cutting samples such as bone, ceramic, antler, or shell.

=== Microscopy and Analytical Lab ===
The Microscopy and Analytical Lab is equipped with microscopes that produce high-resolution digital images, facilitating the analysis of micro-artifacts. Equipment includes a Zeiss V8 8:1 zoom range stereomicroscope, a Zeiss V8 apochromatically corrected stereomicroscope, a Minimo high precision rotary tool mounted onto a microscope for high resolution microdrilling and micromilling, a Zeiss V8 stereomicroscope with polarized LED ringlights, and Zeiss Axiozoom V16 high resolution manual microscope with motorized zoom.

=== Collections Repository ===
The McMaster repository has a capacity for 35,000 boxes of archaeological material. The McMaster facility is equipped with high density mobile shelving, temperature and humidity monitoring, archival-grade collections storage materials, and RFID tracking capabilities.

== International Partnerships ==
Sustainable Archaeology is partnered with the Archaeology Data Service (ADS), based at the University of York.
