= The Young Botanist =

Painting by Paul Peel

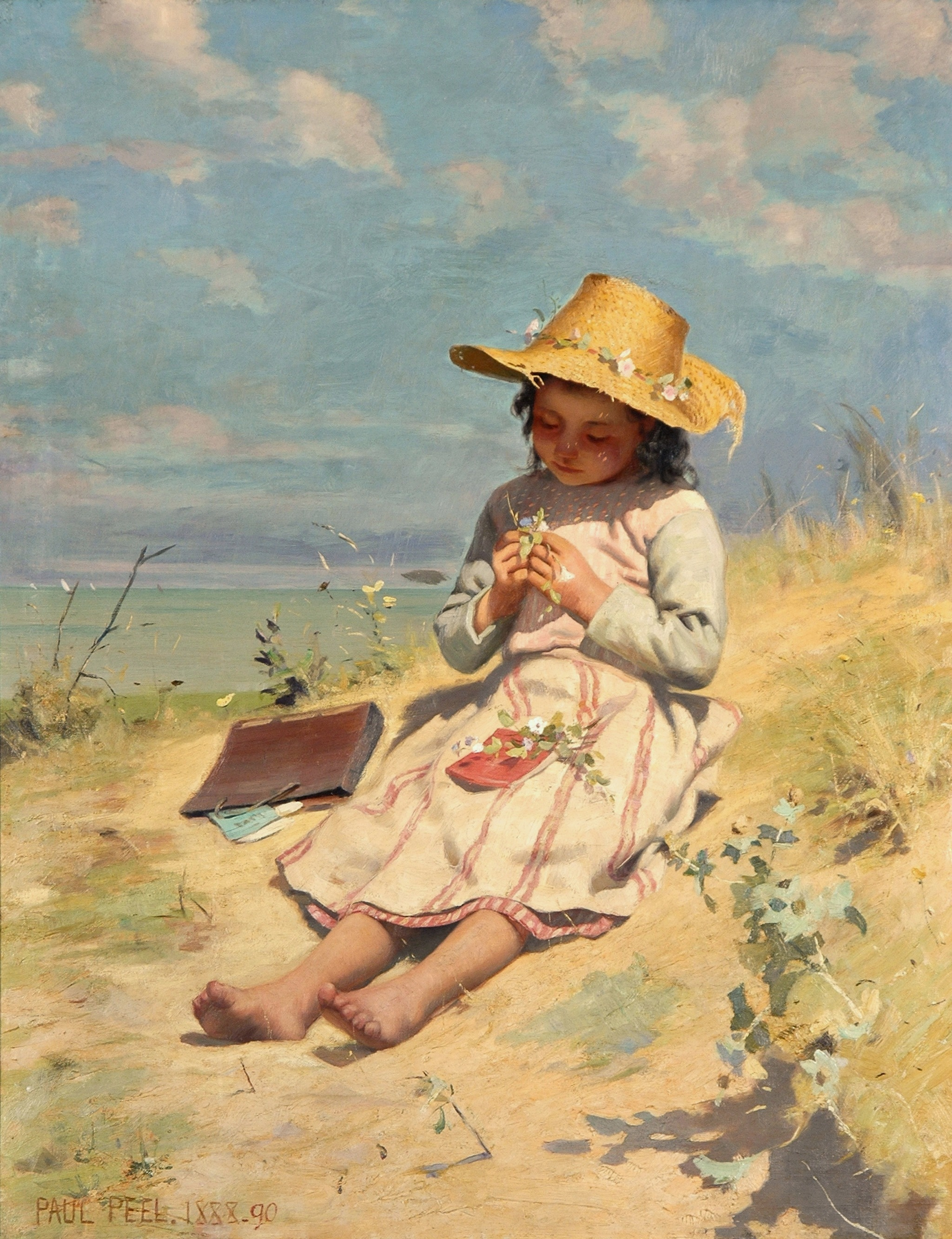
- Artist: Paul Peel
- Year: 1890
- Medium: Oil on canvas
- Dimensions: 114.9 cm × 91.4 cm (45.2 in × 36.0 in)
- Location: Museum London; London, Ontario

The Young Botanist is a painting by Canadian artist Paul Peel. Peel began work on the painting in 1888. He continued work for two more years, completing the work in 1890. In 1987, Museum London, in London, Ontario, purchased the painting. It is still located there.
