= Middlesex College (United Kingdom) =

Fraudulent college in the United Kingdom

Middlesex College was a criminal enterprise established in the United Kingdom in 2003. Its operators deceived international students who truly wanted to study in the UK along with government authorities who unknowingly issued student visas for bogus students.

Middlesex was originally based in Hayes, but later moved to Central London.

Middlesex allegedly offered courses in fashion, business, computing and law at the undergraduate and post-graduate in level. The college claimed that it was providing these courses on behalf of genuine universities. In reality, Middlesex ran only a small number of courses in basic English.

In February 2016, the UK Border Agency arrested the operators of Middlesex at their homes. The agency also raided the Middlesex offices, seizing hundreds of documents. They discovered that despite claiming to have 1000 students, the Middlesex facility only had four small classrooms. The agency also discovered that the operators were printing the signatures of former staff members on bogus qualification certificates and enrollment forms.
