= Middlesex Community College =

Middlesex Community College may refer to the following colleges:

- Middlesex Community College (Connecticut)
- Middlesex Community College (Massachusetts)
- Middlesex County College, Edison, New Jersey
