= Museum of Ontario Archaeology =

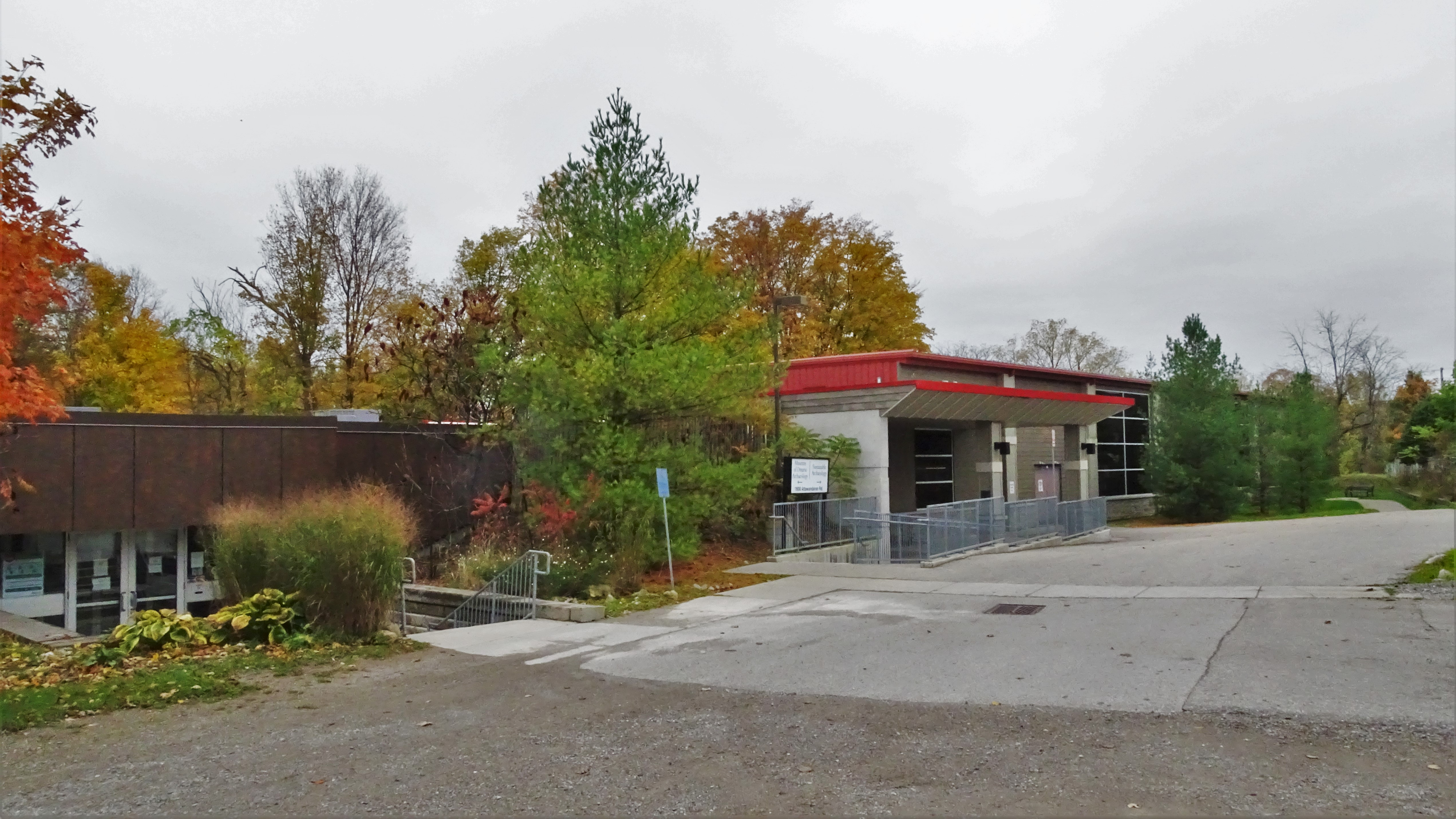
- Established: 1933
- Location: 1600 Attawandaron Road; London, Ontario, Canada; N6G 3M6
- Coordinates: 43.013426°N 81.30559°W
- Type: Archaeology museum
- Website: https://archaeologymuseum.ca/

The Museum of Ontario Archaeology (formerly the Museum of Indian Archaeology and Pioneer Life, the Museum of Indian Archaeology (London) and the London Museum of Archaeology) is a museum located in northwest London, Ontario, Canada. It is dedicated to the study and public interpretation of over 11,000 years of human history in Ontario. It is adjacent to a reconstruction of the Lawson Site, a 16th-century pre-contact Attawandaron People's (Neutral Iroquoian) village. The museum offers permanent and temporary gallery space, a theatre, a classroom and children's activity space, along with tours of the reconstructed village.

The museum is an Affiliated Research Institute of The University of Western Ontario. It houses over two million artifacts recovered from archaeological sites throughout Ontario, along with laboratory space for artifact analysis and an extensive library of archaeological books and manuscripts.

Four events are featured each year: The Annual Harvest Festival and Pow Wow in September, Art & Craft Sale featuring traditional First Nation art and craft vendors in late November, Snowsnake or Winter Festival on Family Day in February, and Wilfrid Jury Archaeology Day in late July.

== History ==
The museum has its beginnings in the private artifact collection of Amos Jury and his son Wilfrid. The Jury collection was informally displayed at The University of Western Ontario beginning in 1927, but it was not until 1933 that space was formally set aside for it in the Lawson Memorial Library. Wilfrid Jury became the curator of the newly established Museum of Indian Archaeology and Pioneer Life, although the position was unpaid until 1945.

Wilfrid Jury continued to be involved with the museum until his death in 1981. In 1969, he encouraged Colonel Tom Lawson and members of the Fuller family to donate the land containing the Lawson Site to The University of Western Ontario. Construction of the Lawson-Jury building, the current home of the Museum of Ontario Archaeology, began in 1980 and was completed in 1981.

The museum is located on two archaeological sites. Prior to construction of the Lawson-Jury building, an archaeological assessment discovered the remains of a 4,000-year-old campsite, now known as the Spook Hollow site. The reconstructed village sits atop the Lawson site, a Neutral Iroquoian village occupied in the 16th century.

== Lawson site ==
Reconstruction of the Lawson site

The Lawson Site is situated on a plateau between Medway River and Snake Creek, tributaries of the Thames River. Around 1500 AD this plateau was the location of a densely fortified Neutral Iroquois village with a peak population of as many as 1,900 individuals. The site was known to amateur collectors since the mid 19th century. The first archaeological excavations of the site were undertaken by W.J. Wintemberg from 1921 to 1923, and Wilfrid Jury excavated the site through the 1930s and 40s.

The site was extensively excavated in the 1970s in association with the development of the adjacent Museum of Ontario Archaeology. The Anthropology Department of The University of Western Ontario runs an annual field school at the site. The Lawson site was the first archaeological site in Ontario to be placed on the Canadian Register of Historic Places.

The remains of at least 39 longhouses have been identified within the village, along with numerous middens and pits. The entire village was surrounded by a series of palisade walls and defensive earthworks. Over 500,000 artifacts have been recovered from the site, providing valuable information about the daily lives of the site's occupants. The inhabitants of the Lawson site were horticulturalists, growing corn, beans and squash (known as the Three Sisters) on fields surrounding the village.

== Affiliations ==
The museum is affiliated with: CMA, CHIN, The University of Western Ontario and the Virtual Museum of Canada.

In 2011 Sustainable Archaeology: Western, a University of Western Ontario archaeological research facility and repository, was constructed adjacent to the museum. Sustainable Archaeology is an inter-institutional collaborative research facility between the University of Western Ontario and McMaster University.

== Related Pages ==
- Sustainable Archaeology
