= Middlesex College (University of Western Ontario) =

Coordinates: 43°00′34″N 81°16′13″W

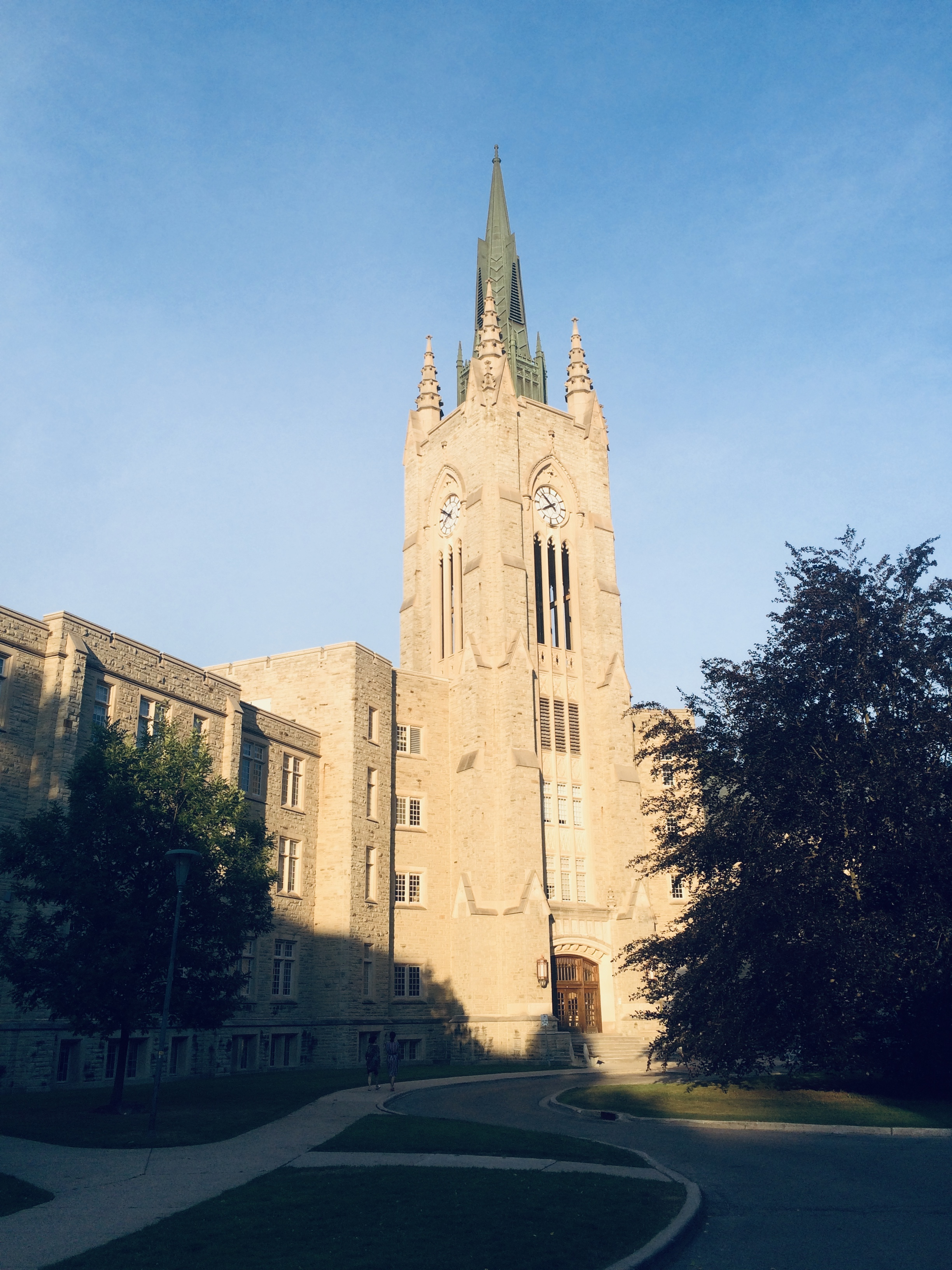
- Interactive map of the Middlesex College area

General information
- Type: Academic
- Architectural style: Collegiate Gothic
- Location: London, Ontario, Canada
- Groundbreaking: 1959
- Cost: $1,740,000
- Owner: University of Western Ontario

Design and construction
- Main contractor: Ellis-Don Ltd.

Middlesex College is an academic building located on the campus of the University of Western Ontario. The building is known for its collegiate Gothic architecture, spire, and clock tower. It currently houses the Department of Mathematics and Computer Science.

Along with University College, the building is one of the most iconic buildings on the University of Western Ontario campus and is heavily used in promotion of the university.

== History ==
The cornerstone for the building was installed in 1959 and the building cost was $1.74 million. Construction was completed by general contractors Ellis-Don Ltd. The building was opened in the fall of 1960. The Department of History was the first faculty housed in the building at this time.

The large clock tower houses five 8-foot diameter bells weighing 400 lbs each, which were tuned to E, B, E, F and G#. The bells were manufactured by Gillett and Johnston. First installed with the clock faces in 1960, the bells were decommissioned in 2007 due to high refurbishment costs.

The building was designed by architect Ronald Murphy.
