= Gothic Revival architecture in Canada =

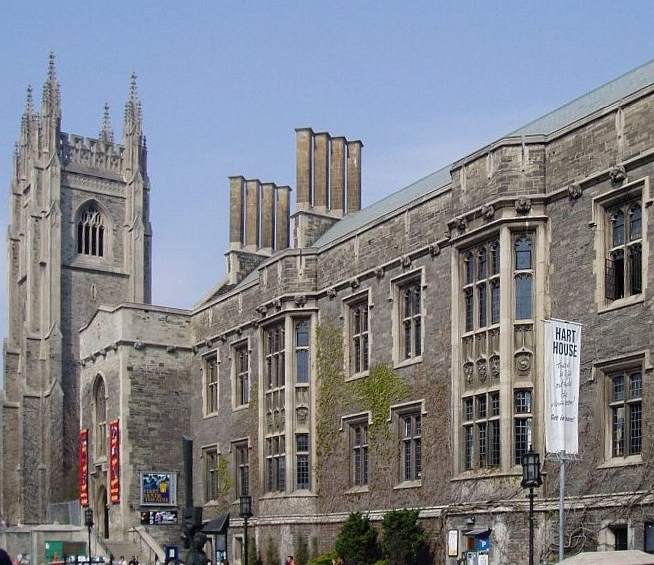
Hart House at the University of Toronto, designed by Henry Sproatt

Gothic Revival architecture in Canada is an historically influential style, with many prominent examples. The Gothic Revival style was imported to Canada from Britain and the United States in the early 19th century, and it rose to become the most popular style for major projects throughout the late 19th and early 20th centuries.

The Gothic Revival era lasted longer and was more thoroughly embraced in Canada than in either Britain or the United States, only falling out of style in the 1930s. The period during the late 19th and early 20th centuries was also a time when many major Canadian institutions were founded. Throughout Canada, many of the most prominent religious, civic, and scholastic institutions are housed in Gothic Revival style buildings. During the 1960s and 1970s, several scholars (most notably Alan Gowans) embraced Canadian Gothic Revival architecture as one of the nation's signature styles and as an integral part of Canadian nationalism. While largely abandoned in the modernist period, several postmodern architects have embraced Canada's neo-Gothic past.

== History ==
=== Introduction to Canada ===
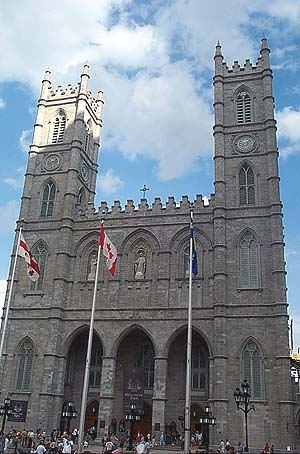
Notre-Dame de Montréal, one of Canada's first major Gothic Revival structure. Its symmetry and straight lines still evoke the previous Georgian and neo-classical styles.

Gothic Architecture is a name given in retrospect to many of the major projects of the High Middle Ages. As this period covered the 13th and 14th centuries, there are no authentic Gothic buildings in Canada. The style was quite out of favour in the 17th century, when Europeans first began erecting structures in Canada, and the style is absent from the early settlements in New France and the Maritimes.

In the 18th century, a growing spirit of Romanticism and interest in the Medieval past led to a revival of Gothic styles in Britain. The style made its way to Canada during the early 19th century. One of the first appearances is in an 1811 proposal by Jeffry Wyatt for a new legislature in Quebec City. One of the first major Gothic Revival structures in Canada was Notre-Dame Basilica in Montreal, which was designed in 1824 by the Irish-American James O'Donnell. The largest church in North America upon its completion, it was one of the first architectural works of international note to be built in Canada. It was also one of the first Catholic Gothic Revival structures, as the movement would not spread from Britain to France and continental Europe until several years later. As the most prominent church in the colony, its form was much imitated by local church builders, who constructed miniature versions of the basilica across Quebec.

Protestants also embraced the style. As early as the late 18th century, certain Gothic elements had appeared in a church in Nova Scotia, though the Georgian and Neo-classical styles remained dominant for several decades. The first stone neo-Gothic structure in the Maritimes is St. John's Church in Saint John, New Brunswick. It dates to 1824, the same year work began on Notre-Dame. In the 1830s and 1840s, four prominent neo-Gothic churches were built in Quebec City, representing each of that city's major Protestant denominations.

By the 1840s, the Gothic Revival style had become virtually universal among Anglicans and was used for most other Christian denominations as well. As in much of the English speaking world, the lancet windows and buttresses of the Gothic Revival style soon became permanently associated in most people's mind with ecclesiastical buildings. It was soon also embraced for secular purposes as well, such as government buildings and universities. Canadian universities modeled themselves on the great British universities, Oxford and Cambridge, and this extended to embracing the Collegiate Gothic architecture used in their construction. Two of the first Gothic Revival colleges were Trinity College in Toronto and Bishop's University in Quebec.

=== Victorian High Gothic ===
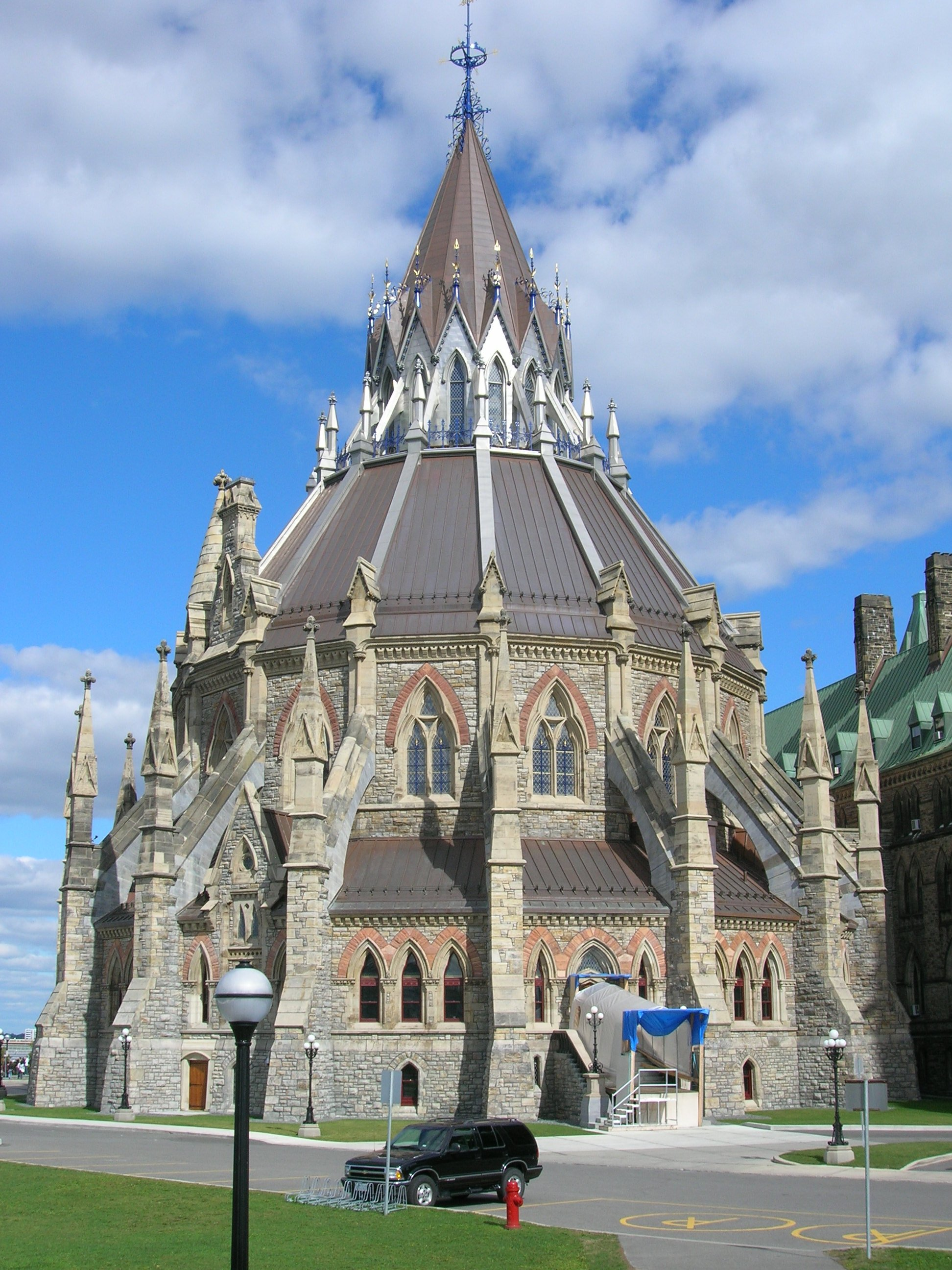
The Library of Parliament

In the later half of the 19th century, Gothic Revival architecture became the dominant style for major Canadian buildings. As the style became accepted and popular, architects became more willing to experiment and modify its conventions. While previous Gothic Revival architects had attempted to closely recapture the style of the Middle Ages, the new architects retained the Medieval motifs, but recombined them in entirely new ways.

One of the most important examples of this style anywhere in the world were the Parliament Buildings designed by Thomas Fuller. While the style and design of the building is unquestionably Gothic, it resembles no building constructed during the Middle Ages. The forms were the same, but their arrangement was uniquely modern. The Parliament Buildings also departed from Medieval models by integrating a variety of eras and styles of Gothic architecture, including elements of Gothic architecture from Britain, France, the Low Countries, and Italy all in one building.

In his Hand Book to the Parliamentary and Departmental Buildings, Canada (1867), Joseph Bureau wrote, "The style of the Buildings is the Gothic of the 12th and 13th Centuries, with modification to suit the climate of Canada. The ornamental work and the dressing round the windows are of Ohio sandstone. The plain surface is faced with a cream-colored sandstone of the Potsdam formation, obtained from Nepean, a few miles from Ottawa. The spandrils of the arches, and the spaces between window-arches and the sills of the upper windows, are filled up with a quaint description of stonework, composed of stones of irregular size, shape and colour, very neatly set together."

This style was also embraced for religious architecture. In most towns in Ontario, and also in many parts of the newly settled west and the Maritimes, elaborate High Gothic churches were built. Unlike in the earlier era, the French Catholic church in Quebec did not embrace this style. During this period the church leadership favoured a neo-baroque style more closely linked to the architecture of New France.

The Victorian High Gothic period also saw a willingness to combine the neo-Gothic with other styles. Two important examples of a mix between Gothic and Romanesque styles are University College in Toronto and the British Columbia Parliament Buildings. Variations on the neo-Gothic style developed in Britain were also imported to Canada. The Scottish baronial style was employed by Chief Dominion Architect David Ewart to create a number of castle like structures in Ottawa. New materials were also incorporated. Cast iron allowed stronger structures with thinner supporting walls to be built, while some recreated gothic forms in brick, rather than the traditional stone or wood.

One style that rose to special prominence was the Château Style of Canada's grand railway hotels, also known as Railway Gothic. This style first appeared in the late 19th century, with grandiose railway hotels such as the Château Frontenac and Banff Springs Hotel. It mixed Gothic Revival with elements borrowed from the castles of the Loire in France.

=== Architectural dominance ===
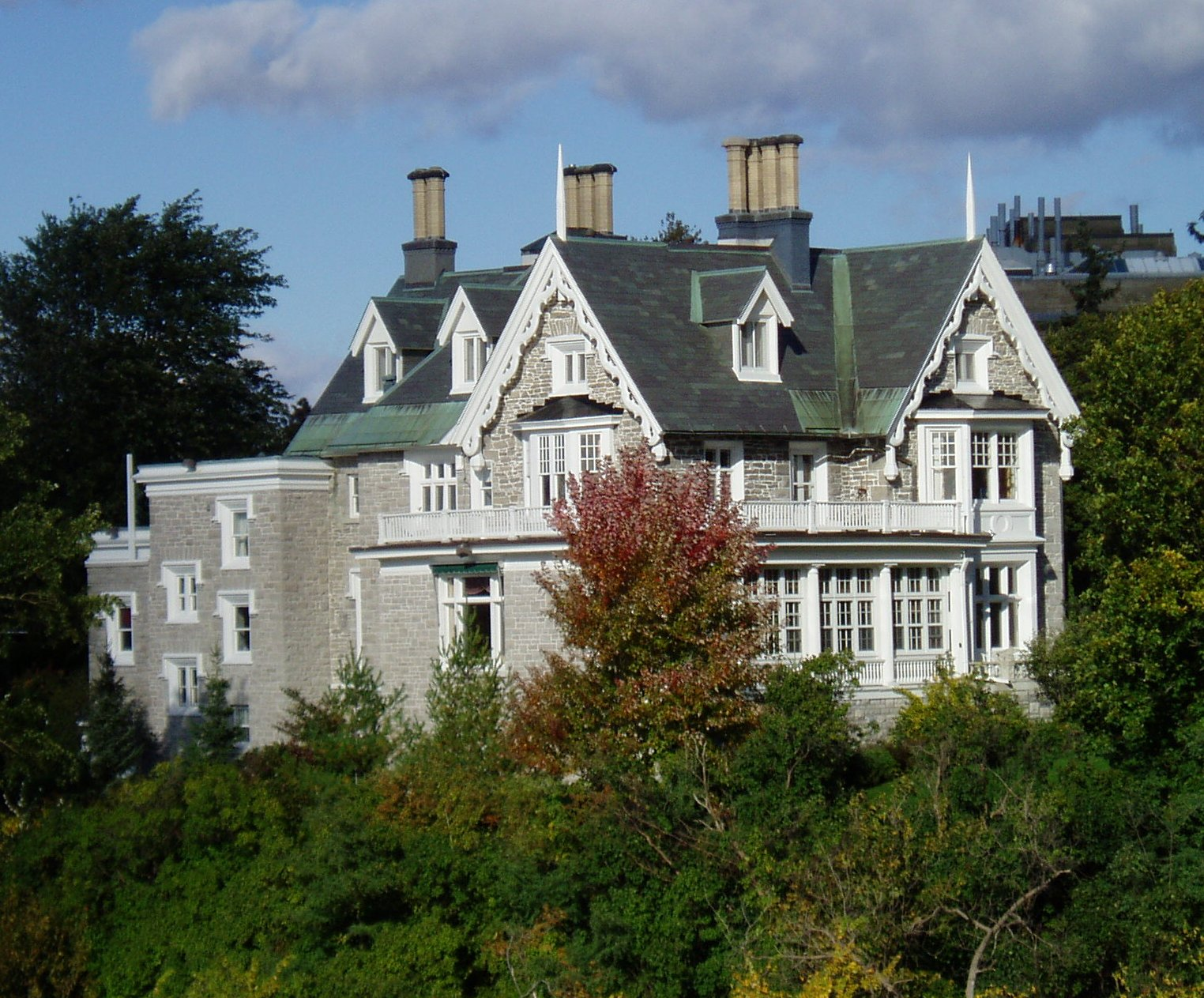
Earnscliffe House in Ottawa is a manor built in the Gothic Revival style

Gothic Revival became the dominant style of Canadian civic architecture largely as a matter of timing. The mid and late 19th century was the period that the Canadian state was formed and when many of its secular and religious institutions were established. Canadian Confederation occurred in 1867, and subsequent years saw a large construction programme as the government and civil service established itself in Ottawa and across the country. Rapid growth of cities, especially in Ontario, saw most Christian denominations in most cities build major churches during this period. The downtowns of most Canadian cities are thus dotted with Gothic Revival churches. Canada's historic secular institutions, such as universities and museums, were also founded in this era of rapid growth.

There are other reasons the Gothic styles became so widespread in Canada. The steep roofs and thick stone walls were well suited to Canada's northern climate. In the United States architects liked to link their republic to those of Ancient Greece and Rome through the neo-classical style. Canada's Loyalists had no such leanings, and the English-Canadian elite was strongly Anglophilic and monarchist. Gothic architecture was seen as symbolic of this. In the late 19th century as Canada began to see an influx of Southern and Eastern European immigrants, the nativist backlash also embraced Gothic Revival architecture as emblematic of Canada's identity as a homeland for the "northern race." In French Canada the civic and religious authorities of the 19th and early 20th century also embraced a strident conservatism.

While during this period the Gothic Revival style was almost universal among Christian religious buildings, it was less so among secular structures. Other revival styles were also popular. Romanesque Revival buildings were popular, as were neo-classical structures. No provincial legislature copied the style of the Parliament buildings. Even in Ottawa several federal government buildings of this period embraced other styles.

Pure Gothic forms were mostly unsuited to the day to day requirements of residential and commercial properties; however, neo-Gothic ornamentation and principles were successfully adapted to these uses, and these structures became quite popular in the late 19th and early 20th centuries. In rural areas the Gothic Cottage was immensely popular until well into the 20th century. Neighbourhoods that grew during this period, such as Cabbagetown and the Annex in Toronto, have many examples of houses that incorporate neo-Gothic elements. This includes a highly vertical emphasis on the structure; ornate decorations on the gables, often incorporating classic Gothic trefoil forms; and lancet windows and door frames. In rural Ontario the ubiquitous Ontario Cottage was often adorned with Gothic elements.

=== Modern Gothic ===
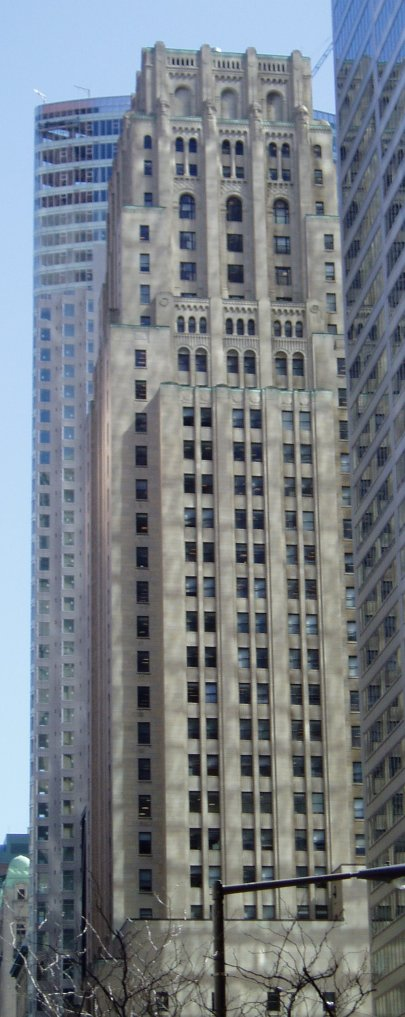
Commerce Court in Toronto. A Beaux-Arts building with Gothic Revival elements was the tallest building in Canada from 1930 until 1962

The Gothic Revival style started to wane in popularity in the late 19th century. New technologies such as steel building frames, elevators, and electric lighting were having a considerable impact on how buildings could be used and constructed. Newer styles such as the Beaux-Arts and Art Deco came to prominence. However, this was much less true in Canada. Gothic Revival architecture continued to be one of the most important building styles well into the 1940s, though often in highly modified and original forms. Just before the First World War Toronto saw work begin on three of its best known neo-Gothic structures, Casa Loma, the CHUM-City Building, and Hart House. While the three buildings were erected for completely different purposes, and a very distinct in style, they are all clearly Gothic in inspiration.

In the years after the First World War, when the Gothic Revival was being supplanted in most of the world, Canada was also experiencing greatly strengthened Canadian nationalism. For the first time the Canadian political and cultural elite began to seek a path distinct from that being followed in the United Kingdom and United States. As so many notable Canadian structures were Gothic Revival in style it became closely linked to Canadian identity, and was embraced by the new Canadian nationalism.

Perhaps the most important Gothic Revival structure was the new Centre Block of the Canadian Parliament. The Gothic Revival monument of Thomas Fuller was destroyed by a fire in 1917. Despite the half a century that had elapsed since the first parliament was built, the Gothic Revival style was still the obvious choice to the Canadian Government. The new building had several important differences from the old one, most notably the new Peace Tower. The federal government continued building in the Gothic Revival style, of which long-serving prime minister William Lyon Mackenzie King was a strong supporter, for several decades. As the federal government expanded, two major civil service office buildings were built in the Gothic style just to the west of Parliament Hill in the 1930s.

After the First World War some of the most prominent Gothic Revival structures were constructed by Canada's universities, in a style that is often known as Collegiate Gothic. The newer universities of western Canada, such as the University of British Columbia and University of Saskatchewan, turned to traditional styles as they underwent large expansions. The older universities of Ontario also built several new Gothic Revival Structures.

Gothic Revival finally almost completely disappeared after the Second World War, as Canada embraced Modern Architecture and the International Style. This was motivated by the prevailing fashion of the period, but also by economics and technology. The stark new structures of steel and glass were vastly cheaper than the often ornate stone constructions of the neo-Gothic style. The style thus almost completely disappeared.

The rise of postmodern architecture, with its interest in history and place, has seen the occasional reintegration of Gothic Revival styles. One example is Massey College at the University of Toronto. Its materials and the elements of its design are fully modern; however, the form and arrangement of those materials directly quotes from the Gothic Revival structures on campus. Another is the Windsor Arms Hotel, also in Toronto. It is a modern Gothic styled skyscraper built on the base of an older Gothic Revival structure from the start of the 20th century.

== List of Gothic Revival buildings in Canada ==
Prominent Gothic Revival buildings across Canada listed by province.

=== Newfoundland and Labrador ===
Building	Function	Year	Image
St. Thomas's Church, St. John's	Church	1836	
St. Paul's Church, Harbour Grace	Church	1837	
St. Peters Church, Twillingate	Church	1845	
Cathedral of St. John the Baptist, St. John's	Church	1847	
St. Patrick's Church, St. John's	Church	1855	
St. Patrick's Church, Woody Bay	Church	1875	
Holy Trinity Convent and Chapel, Witless Bay	School	1890	
Holy Redeemer Anglican Church, Spaniard's Bay	Church	1891	
St. Patrick's Church, Carbonear	Church	1891	
Cathedral of Immaculate Conception, Harbour Grace	Church	1892	
Immaculate Conception Church, Cape Broyle	Church	1947	

=== Nova Scotia ===
==== Halifax ====
Building	Function	Year	Image
St. Matthew's United Church	Church	1857	
St. Patrick's Church	Church	1885	
The Khyber	Social Centre	1888	
St. Mary's Basilica	Church	1899	
All Saint's Cathedral	Cathedral	1910	

==== Rest of Nova Scotia ====
Building	Function	Year	Image
St. John's Anglican Church, Lunenburg	Church	1754	
St. George's Church, Sydney	Church	1791	
Trinity United Church, Mahone Bay	Church	1835	
Old Courthouse, Guysborough	Museum	1843	
Hensley Memorial Chapel, University of King's College, Windsor	Hall	1863	
St. John's Lutheran Church, Mahone Bay	Church	1869	
Holy Trinity Anglican Church, Yarmouth	Church	1870	
St. Ann's Catholic Church, Guysborough	Church	1873	
St. Luke's Anglican Church, Annapolis Royal	Church	1874	
Seaview Cottage, Antigonish	House	1876	
Trinity Anglican Church, Digby	Church	1878	
St. John's Anglican Church, Peggy's Cove	Church	1880	
Central United Church, Lunenburg	Church	1885	
Trinity Anglican Church, Jordan Falls	Church	1887	
St. James' Anglican Church, Mahone Bay	Church	1887	
Zion Evangelical Lutheran Church, Lunenburg	Church	1890	
First Baptist Church, Amherst	Church	1895	
St. Mary's Catholic Church, Mabou	Church	1897	
St. Paul's Anglican Church, Antigonish	Church	1898	
Trinity Anglican Church, Sydney Mines	Church	1904	
St. John the Evangelist Church, Windsor	Church	1909	
St. Bernard Church, St. Bernard	Church	1952	

=== New Brunswick ===
Building	Function	Year	Image
Trinity Church, Kingston Parish	Church	1789	
St. John's Anglican Church, Saint John	Church	1826	
Christ Church Cathedral, Fredericton	Church	1853	
Cathedral of the Immaculate Conception, Saint John	Church	1853	
Saint-Thomas de Memramcook Church, Memramcook	Church	1855	
Trinity Anglican Church, Saint John	Church	1880	
Sainte-Thérèse d'Avila Church, Robertville	Church	1884	
Sacred Heart Cathedral, Bathurst	Church	1886	
St Bernard's Catholic Church, Moncton	Church	1891	
Alcorn Manor, Moncton	Residential	1908	
Notre-Dame-de-Lourdes Church, Notre-Dame-de-Lourdes Parish	Church	1910	
St. Michael's Basilica, Miramichi	Church	1921	

=== Prince Edward Island ===
Building	Function	Year	Image
St. John's Presbyterian Church, Belfast	Church	1824	
Gordon Memorial United Church, Alberton	Church	1857	
St. Simon & St. Jude Church, Tignish	Church	1860	
St. Peter's Cathedral, Charlottetown	Church	1869	
St. Brigid's Church, Foxley River	Church	1873	
St. Patrick's Roman Catholic Church, Prince County	Church	1890	
Immaculate Conception Church, Prince County	Church	1892	
St. John the Baptist Church, Miscouche	Church	1892	
St. Mary's Roman Catholic Church, Indian River	Church	1902	
St. Dunstan's Basilica, Charlottetown	Church	1916	

=== Quebec ===
==== Quebec City ====
Building	Function	Year	Image
Chalmers-Wesley United Church	Church	1853	
Saint-Michel-de-Sillery Church	Church	1854	
Bibliothèque Claire-Martin	Library	1870	
Maison Mère-Mallet Chapel	Church	1887	
Sainte-Hélène-de-Breakeyville Church	Church	1909	
Notre-Dame du Sacré-Coeur Sanctuary	Church	1910	
La Nativité-de-Notre-Dame de Beauport Church	Church	1916	
Saint-Dominique Church	Church	1930	

==== Montreal ====
Building	Function	Year	Image
Notre-Dame de Montréal Basilica	Church	1829	
Saint-Laurent Church	Church	1837	
St. Patrick's Basilica	Church	1847	
Cégep de Saint-Laurent	College	1847	
Trafalgar Lodge	House	1848	
Saint-François-de-Sales Church	Church	1851	
Church of Saint-Pierre-Apôtre	Church	1853	
Christ Church Cathedral	Church	1859	
Saint-Jacques Cathedral	University	1860	
Saint-Joseph Church	Church	1861	
Duggan House (Braehead)	University	1861	
St Jax Montréal	Church	1864	
Saint-Sauveur Church	Hospital	1865	
Musée des métiers d'art du Québec	Museum	1867	
Collège Notre-Dame du Sacré-Cœur	College	1869	
Wilson Chambers Building	Commercial	1869	
St. George's Anglican Church	Church	1870	
McGill University Institute of Islamic Studies	University	1871	
Frederick-Thomas Judah House (Villa Rosa)	Office	1875	
Church of St. John the Evangelist	Church	1878	
Saint-Joachim de Pointe-Claire Church	Church	1885	
St. James United Church	Church	1889	
Montreal Diocesan Theological College	University	1896	
St-John's United Church	Church	1896	
Mount Royal Cemetery Gate	Gate	unknown	
Bibliothèque Mordecai-Richler	Library	1905	
Black Watch Armoury	Drill Hall	1906	
Union United Church	Church	1907	
Saint-Édouard Church	Church	1909	
Saint-Viateur d'Outremont Church	Church	1911	
Co-Cathedral of Saint-Antoine-de-Padoue	Church	1911	
McGill University Faculty of Religious Studies	University	1912	
St. Matthias Church	Church	1912	
Mountainside United Church	Church	1914	
Loyola College	University	1916	
Westmount City Hall	City Hall	1922	
Victoria Hall	Community Centre	1925	
Martlet House	Commercial	1928	
Ascension of Our Lord Church	Church	1928	
Westmount Park Church	Church	1929	
Saint-Alphonse-d'Youville Church	Church	1931	
Church of St. Andrew and St. Paul	Church	1932	
Le Régiment de Maisonneuve	Drill Hall	1933	

==== Rest of Quebec ====
Building	Function	Year	Image
Christ Church, Sorel-Tracy	Church	1784	
Christ Church, Saint-André-d'Argenteuil	Church	1821	
St. James Anglican Church, Gatineau	Church	1824	
St. George's Church, Drummondville	Church	1833	
Saint-Mungo Church, Brownsburg-Chatham	Church	1836	
Saint-Hilaire Church, Mont-Saint-Hilaire	Church	1837	
Anglican church St. Bartholomew's, Rivière-du-Loup	Church	1841	
Saint-Charles-Borromée Church, Deschambault-Grondines	Church	1842	
Messiah Anglican Church, Sainte-Anne-de-Sabrevois	Church	1848	
St. Paul Anglican Church, Dudswell	Church	1853	
Saint-Roch Church, Saint-Roch-des-Aulnaies	Church	1853	
Saint-Alexandre Church, Saint-Alexandre	Church	1853	
Saint-Patrice Church, Rivière-du-Loup	Church	1855	
Manoir Papineau Gardener's House, Montebello	House	1855	
Papineau Memorial Chapel, Montebello	Church	1855	
La-Décollation-de-Saint-Jean-Baptiste Church, L'Isle-Verte	Church	1855	
Assumption Cathedral, Trois-Rivières	Church	1858	
Saint-Nom-de-Marie Church, Sainte-Marie	Church	1859	
Saint-Germain Cathedral, Rimouski	Church	1859	
Sainte-Émilie Church, Leclercville	Church	1863	
Saint-Maurice Church, Saint-Maurice	Church	1864	
Saint-Austin Church, Austin	Church	1865	
Saint-François-Xavier Church, Batiscan	Church	1866	
Notre-Dame-de-Bonsecours Church, Richelieu	Church	1868	
St. Paul United Church, Ormstown	Church	1869	
Sainte-Anne-de-la-Pérade Church, Sainte-Anne-de-la-Pérade	Church	1869	
St. Luke Church, Waterloo	Church	1870	
St. Luke Anglican Church, Magog	Church	1871	
Saint-Narcisse Church, Saint-Narcisse	Church	1873	
Saint-Jean-Baptiste Church, Roxton Falls	Church	1877	
Saint-Venant-de-Paquette Church, Saint-Venant-de-Paquette	Church	1877	
Saint-Henri Church, Saint-Henri	Church	1879	
Saint-Pierre-de-La Vernière Church, Magdalen Islands	Church	1881	
St. Andrew's Church, Scotstown	Café	1882	
Saint-Blaise Church, Saint-Blaise-sur-Richelieu	Church	1883	
Bishop Stewart of the Holy Trinity Church, Frelighsburg	Church	1884	
Saint-François d'Assise Church, Frelighsburg	Church	1885	
Saint-Denis-de-la-Bouteillerie Church, Saint-Denis-De La Bouteillerie	Church	1887	
Chalmers-Emanuel Presbyterian Church, Lingwick	Church	1890	
St. Barnabas Anglican Church, Lac-Mégantic	Church	1891	
Saint-Patrice Church, Magog	Church	1894	
Ste-Anne-des-Ondes Chapel, Rivière-du-Loup	Church	1896	
Christ Church Chapel Canterbury, Scotstown	Church	1896	
L'Enfant-Jésus Church, Vallée-Jonction	Church	1898	
Séminaire de Sherbrooke, Sherbrooke	School	1898	
McGreer Hall, Bishop's University, Sherbrooke	School	1898	
St. Paul Anglican Church, Dudswell	Church	1899	
Saint-Laurent Church, Matapédia	Church	1903	
Saint-François-de-Sales Church, Gatineau	Church	1903	
Notre-Dame-de-Fourvière Cathedral, Mont-Laurier	Church	1903	
Holy Trinity Anglican Church, Irlande	Church	1904	
Sacré-Coeur Church, Saguenay	Church	1905	
St. George Anglican Church, Granby	Church	1908	
Saint-Prime Church, Saint-Prime	Church	1909	
Saint-Zénon Church, Piopolis	Church	1909	
Saint-Jacques-le-Majeur Church, Causapscal	Church	1912	
Sainte-Agnès Church, Lac-Mégantic	Church	1913	
Saint-Pierre-du-Lac-de-Val-Brillant Church, Val-Brillant	Church	1916	
Sainte-Julienne Church, Sainte-Julienne	Church	1916	
Saint-Louis-de-France Church, East Angus	Church	1923	
Saint-Jérôme Church, Métabetchouan–Lac-à-la-Croix	Church	1926	
Saint-Édouard Church, Saguenay	Church	1928	
Sainte-Famille Church, Granby	Church	1931	
Saint-Isidore Church, Lac-des-Aigles	Church	1933	
Basilica Cathedral of St. Cecilia, Salaberry-de-Valleyfield	Church	1935	
Saint-Michel Basilica-Cathedral, Sherbrooke	Church	1959	

=== Ontario ===
==== Ottawa ====
Building	Function	Year	Image
Notre-Dame Cathedral Basilica	Church	1846	
Earnscliffe	Residence	1855	
Houses of Parliament	Government buildings	1865 (Centre Block rebuilt 1920)	Centre Block
St. Bartholomew's Anglican Church	Church	1868	
St. Andrew's Presbyterian Church	Church	1872	
Christ Church Cathedral	Church	1872	
Lisgar Collegiate Institute	School	1873	
Ottawa Normal School	College	1874	
St. Patrick's Basilica	Church	1875	
St. Alban's Anglican Church	Church	1877	
First Baptist Church	Church	1877	
Canadian Museum of Nature	Museum	1905	
Glebe-St. James United Church	Church	1905	
McLeod-Stewarton United Church	Church	1906	
Royal Canadian Mint	Mint	1908	
MacKay United Church	Church	1910	
St. Peter's Lutheran Church	Church	1910	
First United Church	Church	1911	
Connaught Building	Office	1916	
St. Matthew's Anglican Church	Church	1930	
Confederation Building	Office	1931	
Blessed Sacrament Catholic Church	Church	1932	
Knox Presbyterian Church	Church	1932	
Justice Building	Office	1938	

==== Kingston ====
Building	Function	Year	Image
St. Mary's Cathedral	Church	1848	
Sydenham Street United Church	Church	1852	
Douglas Library, Queen's University	Library	1924	

==== Toronto ====
Building	Function	Year	Image
Cathedral Church of St. James	Church	1850	
St. Michael's Cathedral	Church	1845	
Church of the Holy Trinity	Church	1847	
Church of St. Jude	Church	1848	
Trinity College, University of Toronto	University	1852	
Metropolitan United Church	Church	1872	
1 Spadina Crescent, University of Toronto	University	1875	
St. Andrew's Evangelical Lutheran Church	Church	1878	
Church of the Redeemer	Church	1879	
Hollydene	Residential	1880	
College Street United Church	Church	1885	
Bathurst Street Theatre	Church	1888	
Bloor Street United Church	Church	1890	
St. Peter's Church	Church	1907	
Knox Presbyterian Church	Church	1909	
Birge-Carnegie Library, Victoria College, University of Toronto	Library	1910	
CHUM-City Building	Commercial	1911	
Burwash Hall, Victoria College, University of Toronto	University	1911	
Casa Loma	Residential	1911	
Knox College, University of Toronto	University	1914	
Deer Park United Church	Church	1913	
Hart House, University of Toronto	University	1919	
Soldiers' Tower, University of Toronto	University	1924	
Glenview Presbyterian Church	Church	1929	

==== Hamilton ====
Building	Function	Year	Image
St. Paul's Presbyterian Church	Church	1857	St. Paul's Presbyterian Church National Historic Site of Canada, Hamilton, Ontario. Built in 1854-1857 for the Anglican congregation of St. Andrew’s
Erland Lee Museum	private home, now museum	1873	
Christ's Church Cathedral	Church	1876	
Delta Secondary School	School	1925	Delta Secondary School, Hamilton
Hamilton Hall, McMaster University	University	1926	Exterior view of Hamilton Hall, McMaster
Pigott Building	Residential	1929	Pigott Building (Condos), James Street South, downtown Hamilton, Ontario
University Hall, McMaster University	University	1930	Exterior view of the University Hall, McMaster
Westdale Secondary School	School	1931	A picture of Westdale Secondary School
Cathedral Basilica of Christ the King	Church	1933	Exterior of the Cathedral Basilica of Christ the King, following a restoration that was completed in 2017

==== Rest of Ontario ====
Building	Function	Year	Image
Middlesex County Court House, London	Court House	1829	
Church of St. John the Evangelist, Peterborough	Church	1837	
Church of Our Lady Immaculate, Guelph	Church	1846	
St Andrew's Presbyterian Church, Gananoque	Church	1855	
Saint Arsenije Sremac Serbian Orthodox Church, Whitby	Church	1859	
Devereaux House, Halton Hills	House	1860s	
St. Thomas' Anglican Church, Moose Factory	Church	1860s	
Belleville City Hall, Belleville	City Hall	1873	
St Marys Church, Kitchener	Church	1903	
University College, University of Western Ontario, London	University	1922	
Albert College, Belleville	High School	1923	

=== Manitoba ===
==== Winnipeg ====
Building	Function	Year	Image
St. Andrew's Anglican Church, St. Andrews	Church	1849	
Holy Trinity Anglican Church	Church	1884	
Fort Garry Hotel	Hotel	1913	

=== Saskatchewan ===
==== Saskatoon ====
Building	Function	Year	Image
Albert Community Centre	Community Centre	1912	
King George Community School	School	1912	
Westmount School	School	1913	
Peter MacKinnon Building	University	1913	
Buena Vista School	School	1914	
Thorvaldson Building	University	1924	

=== Alberta ===
==== Edmonton ====
Building	Function	Year	Image
Mary Queen of Martyrs Church	Church	1903	
New Destiny Church	Church	1905	
First Presbyterian Church	Church	1912	
Robertson-Wesley United Church	Church	1913	

==== Calgary ====
Building	Function	Year	Image
Cathedral Church of the Redeemer	Church	1884	
Knox United Church	Church	1913	

=== British Columbia ===
==== Vancouver ====
Building	Function	Year	Image
Holy Rosary Cathedral	Church	1900	
Chemistry Building, UBC	School	1923	
Point Grey Secondary School	School	1929	
St. George's School	School	1930	

==== Victoria ====
Building	Function	Year	Image
St. Andrew's Cathedral	Church	1892	
Hatley Park National Historic Site	University	1906	
Christ Church Cathedral	Church	1929	

== Lost buildings ==
- Wellesley Public School, Toronto – built at the corner of Bay and Wellesley Street in 1874 and demolished during the 1960s to make way for Sutton Place Hotel.

== See also ==
- Canadian architecture
- Gothic Revival architecture
- List of Gothic Revival architecture
