= Wilson Chambers Building =

- Immeuble Wilson Chambers
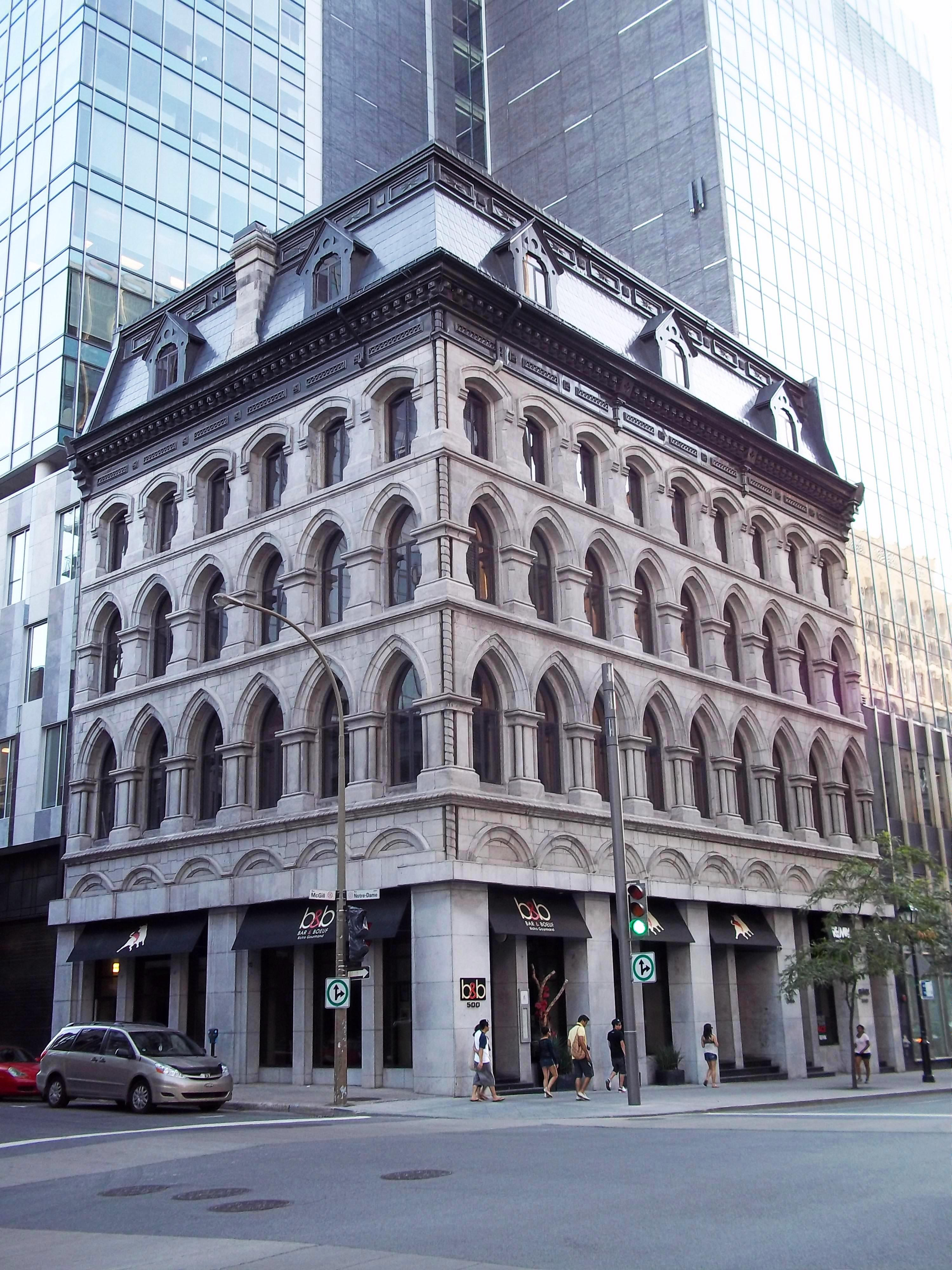
- Exterior view of Wilson Chambers Building
- Interactive map of the Wilson Chambers Building area

General information
- Location: Canada
- Coordinates: 45°30′3.25″N 73°33′35.06″W
- Construction started: 1868
- Completed: 1869
- Renovated: 1990

Technical details
- Floor count: 5

Design and construction
- Architect: Richard C. Windeyer
- Designations

National Historic Site of Canada
- Official name: Wilson Chambers National Historic Site of Canada
- Designated: 1990

The Wilson Chambers Building (French: Immeuble Wilson Chambers) is a heritage building in Montreal, Quebec, Canada. It is located at the corner of McGill Street and Notre Dame Street West in Old Montreal.

It was designed by Richard C. Windeyer, and constructed from 1868 to 1869 by Charles Wilson. It was renovated in 1990 by Amis Nazar.

It was designated as a National Historic Site of Canada in 1990. It was designated due to its Gothic Revival architecture, which is uncommon on commercial buildings in Canada. The building, which is 5 stories tall, also has both Italianate and Second Empire features.
