= Devereaux House, Ontario =

Canadian historic farmhouse

Coordinates: 43.63824°N 79.93546°W

Devereaux House in Halton Hills, Ontario is a historic farmhouse that includes Victorian architecture with Gothic influences. The farm was established in 1829; the house was built during the 1860s.

The house underwent extensive restoration in 2008. It is now rented out for special events. The brick residential building is owned by the town of Halton Hills.
