= Woody Bay, Newfoundland and Labrador =

Natural bay on the island of Newfoundland in Newfoundland and Labrador, Canada

Coordinates: 49.114508°N 58.410427°W

Woody Bay is a natural bay on the island of Newfoundland in the province of Newfoundland and Labrador, Canada. Located 0.5 miles (0.80 km) from Little Port, Woody Bay is about two cables in diameter, and fit for boats only, that have considerable difficulty in entering with westerly winds.
