= St. Mary's Roman Catholic Church (Indian River, Prince Edward Island) =

Church in Canada

Coordinates: 46.160°N 62.646°W

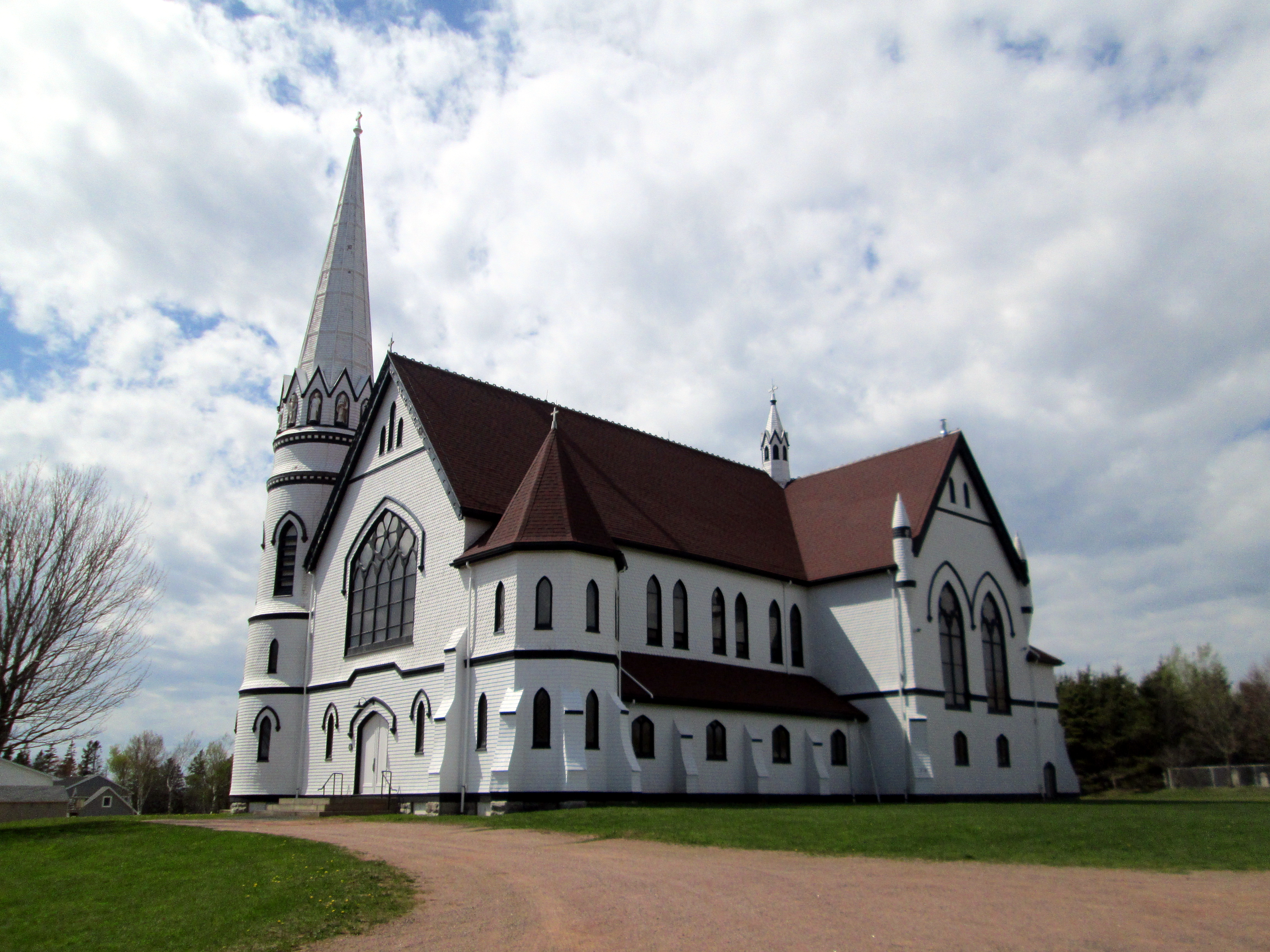
St. Mary's Roman Catholic Church, May 2018

Location of St. Mary's Parish in Prince Edward Island

St. Mary's Parish is a former church in the Canadian province of Prince Edward Island. The church was completed in 1902.
