= St. Brigid's Church, Prince Edward Island =

Church building in Lot 11 and Area, Canada

Coordinates: 46°41′33.17″N 64°0′43.24″W

St. Brigid's Roman Catholic Church
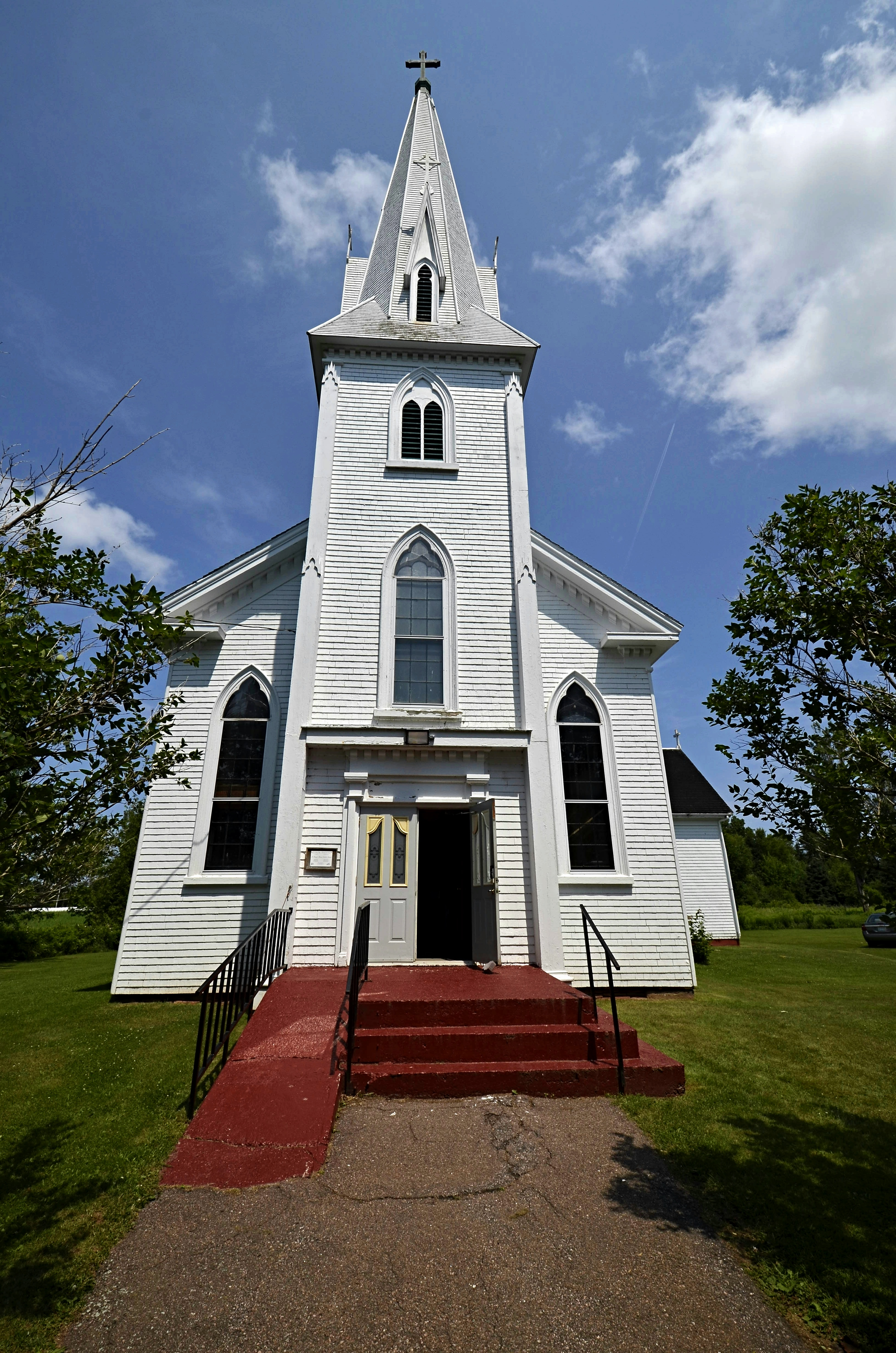
- Interactive map of the St. Brigid's Roman Catholic Church area

General information
- Architectural style: Gothic Revival
- Location: Foxley River, Prince Edward Island, Canada
- Construction started: 1868
- Completed: 1873

Design and construction
- Architect: John McLellan

St. Brigid's Church is a Roman Catholic church in Foxley River, PEI, Canada. It is part of the Roman Catholic diocese of Charlottetown

== History ==
Prior to 1870, residents of Lot 11 traveled to St. Anthony parish, Cascumpeque, a journey that involved a ferry crossing and nine miles of overland travel, or in winter, a horse and sleigh ride across the ice . In 1868, under the guidance of their first priest Rev. James Aeneas McDonald (1820- ?), the Catholic settlers of Lot 11 began constructed their own church. It was completed in 1873, although by Christmas Eve 1870, construction was far enough advanced that midnight mass was celebrated on a temporary altar.
The church was named due to the predominantly Irish pioneer settlement of the area. St. Brigid was a 5th-Century Irish saint.
In 1914 a sacristy was added to the church.
In 1931 the spire was struck by lightning and during repairs, a new copper cross was installed
Since 1982, there has been no resident priest. Services are conducted by Fr. Danny Wilson, Pastor of St. Anthony's, Bloomfield, PEI.
In 2003 the church was officially recognized as a Registered Historic Place under the Heritage Places Protection Act of Prince Edward Island.
Since 1870, the church has held an annual summer picnic.

== Architecture ==
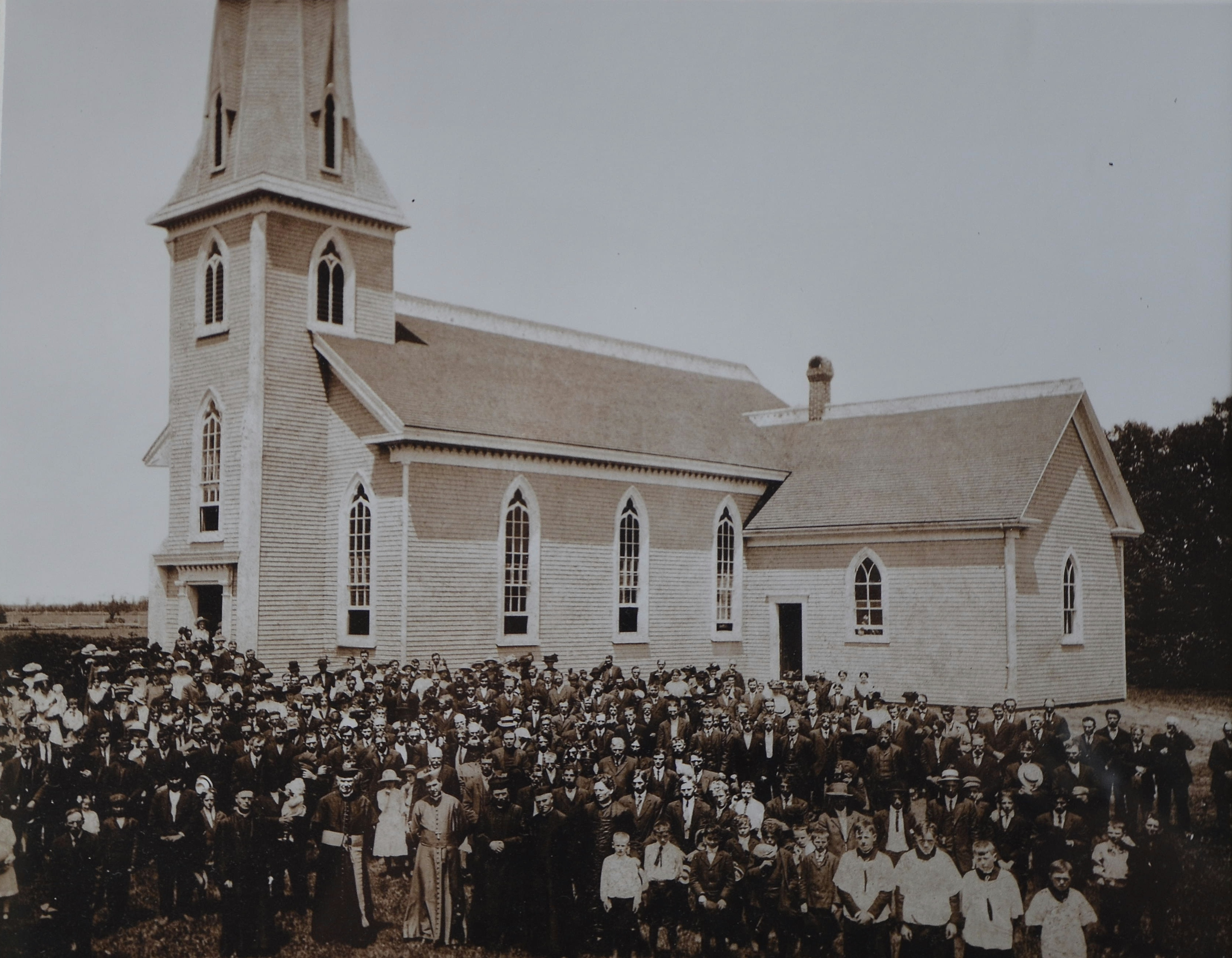
Opening of the new sacristy 1914

The architect was John McLellan, who also designed St. Joachim's Roman Catholic church at Vernon River, PEI and St. Joseph's convent in Charlottetown, PEI

. The builder was Jeremiah Dalton. The church features Gothic Revival architecture, with a central tower topped by an elaborate pointed spire crowned with a cross. The spire’s roof is adorned with decorative, high, narrow dormers on each of its four sides. Extensive renovations were carried out in 1913–14, when a side vestry was added.
The church measures sixty feet in length by thirty feet in width. The walls are 22 feet high. The interior is entirely paneled in wood. Two stained glass windows decorate the altar, one depicting St. Brigid and one depicting St. Patrick.

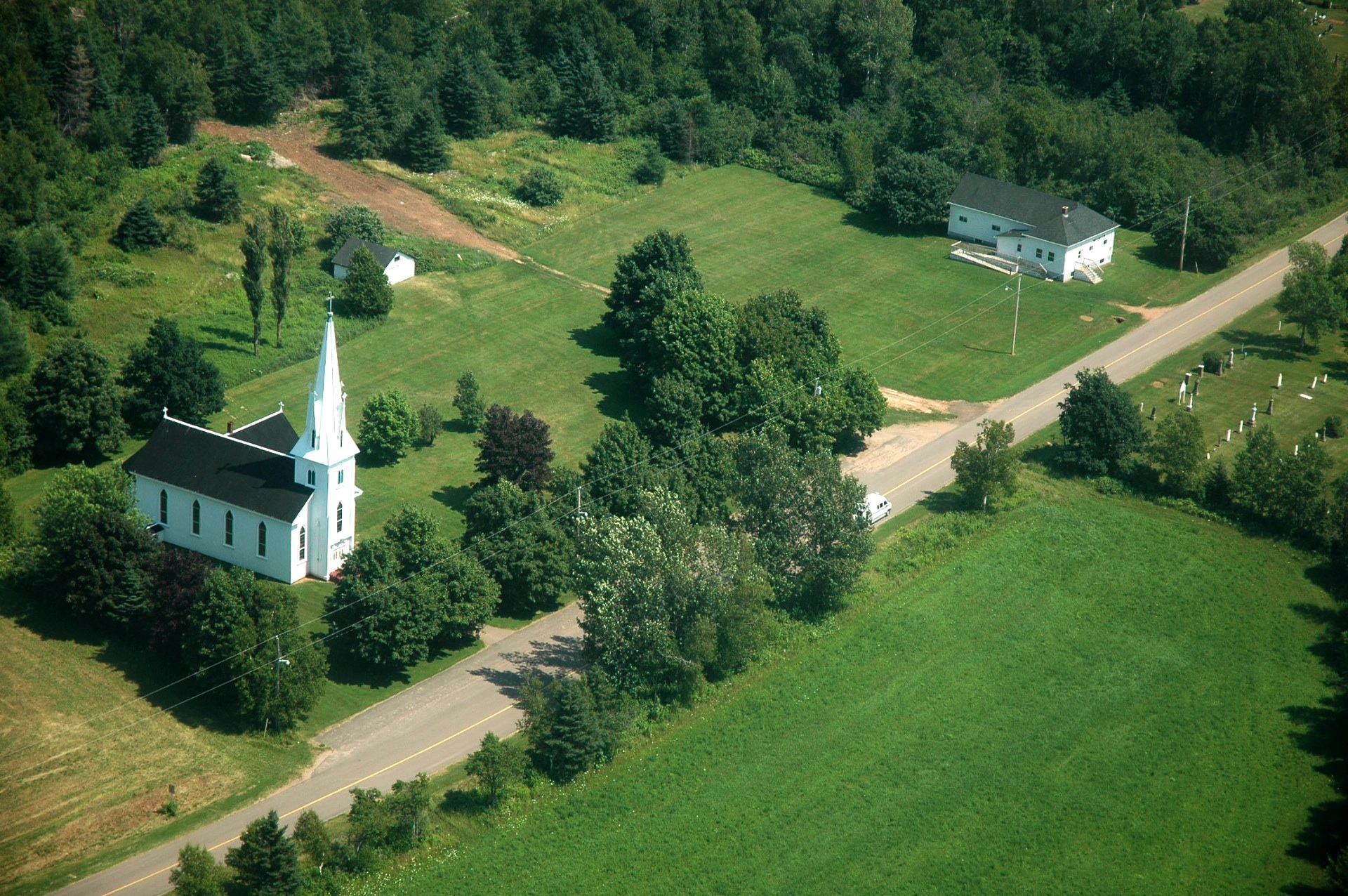
Aerial view

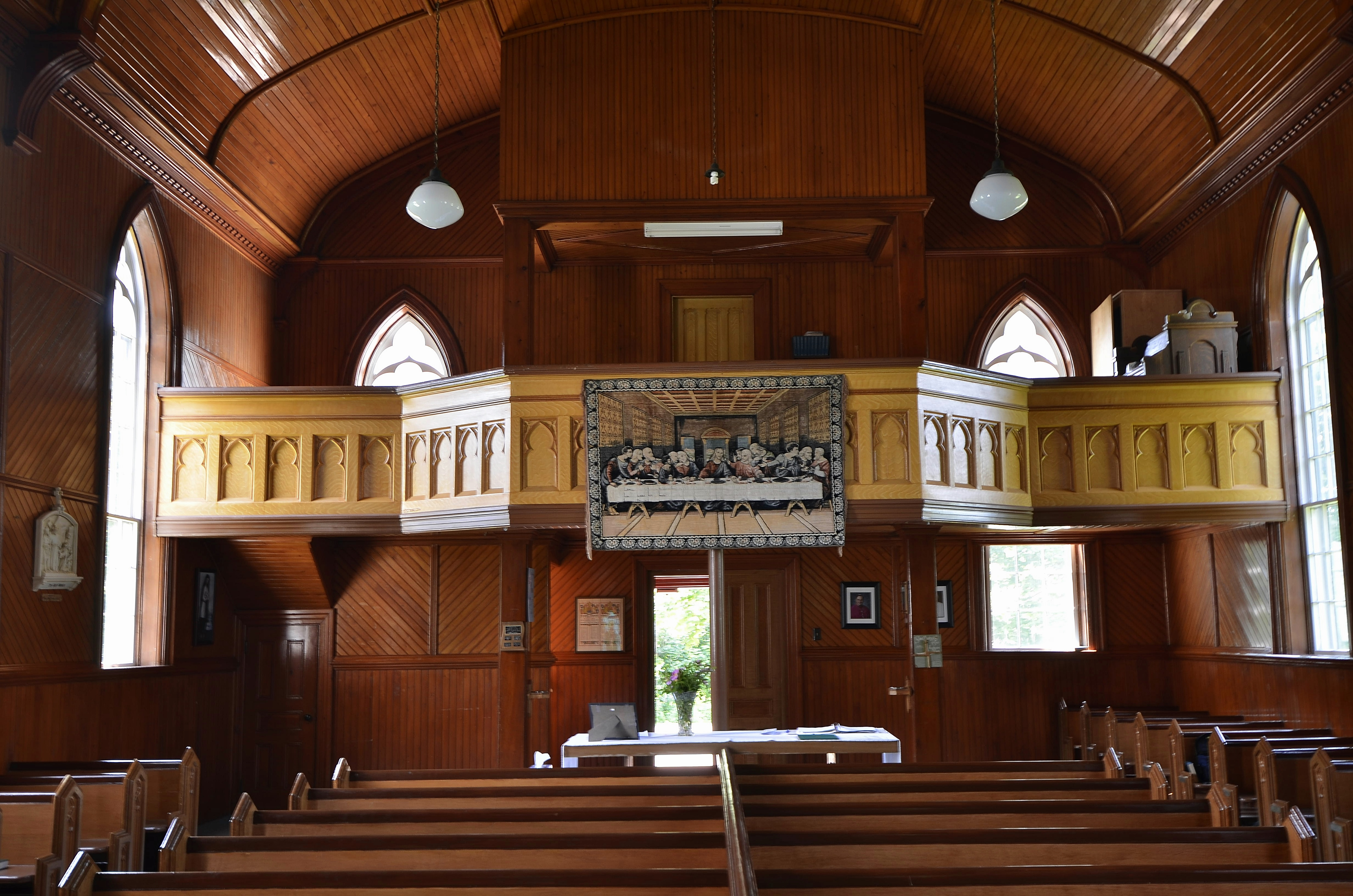
Choir loft

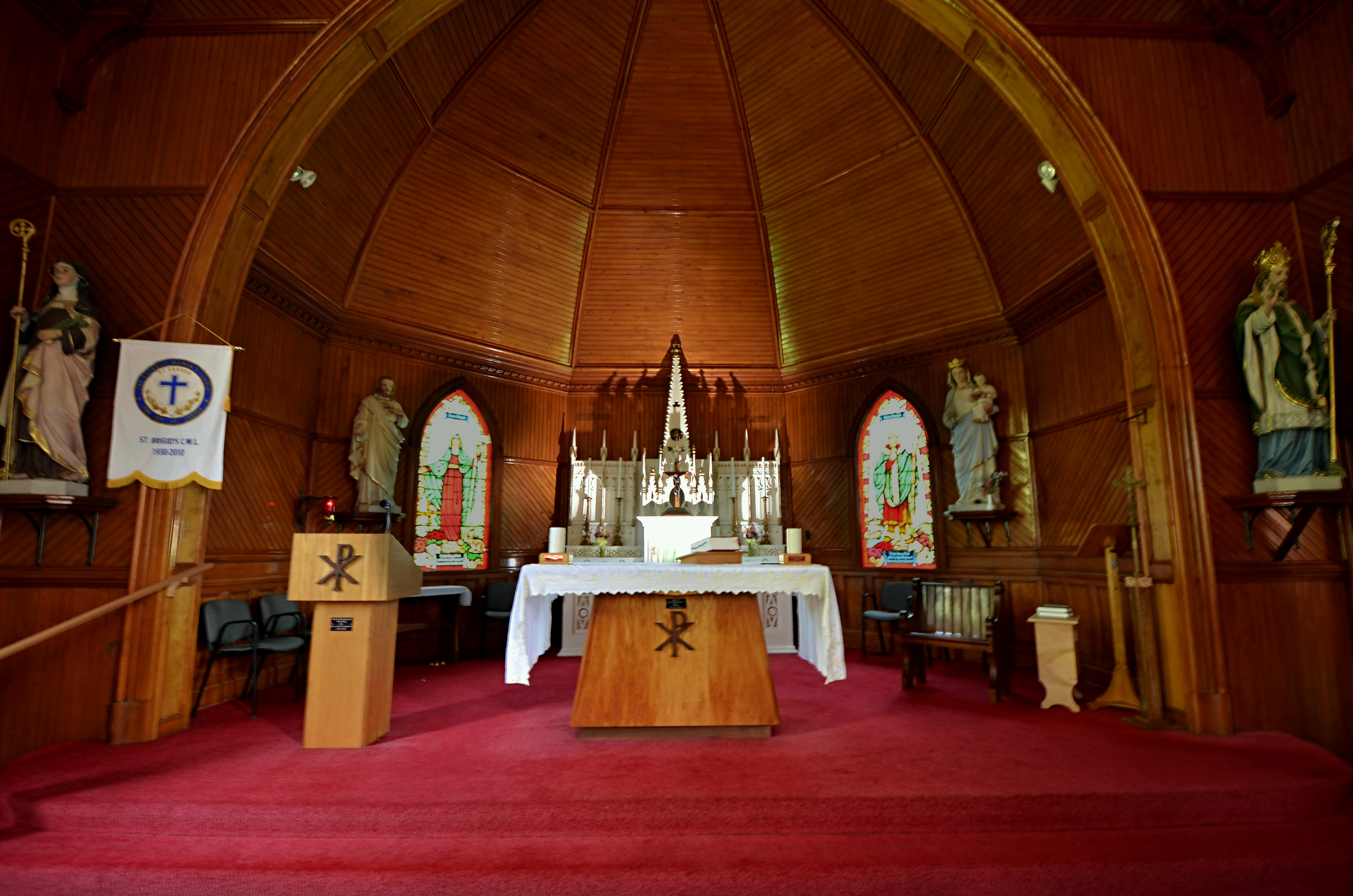
Altar

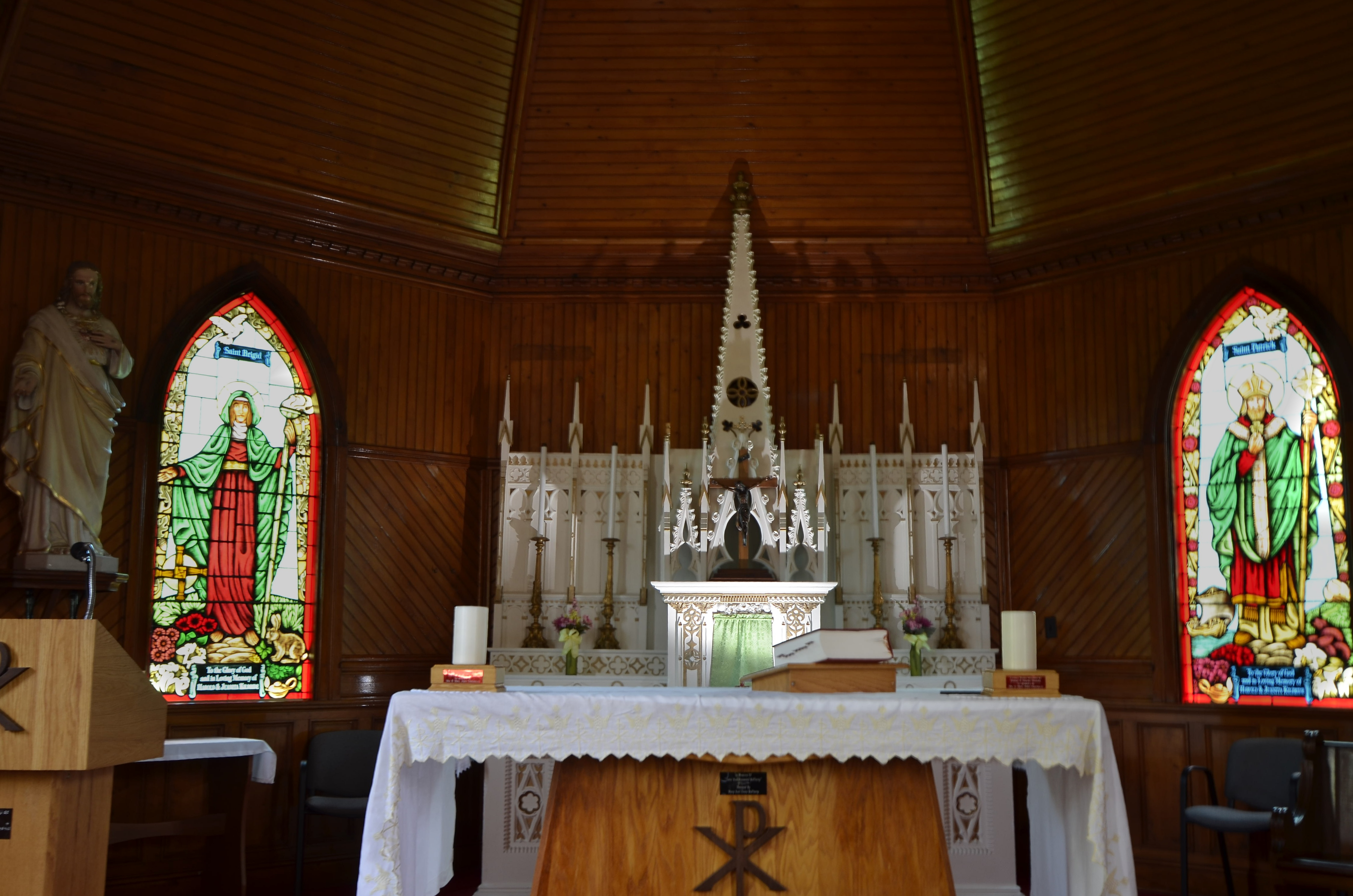
Altar detail
