= University College (University of Western Ontario) =

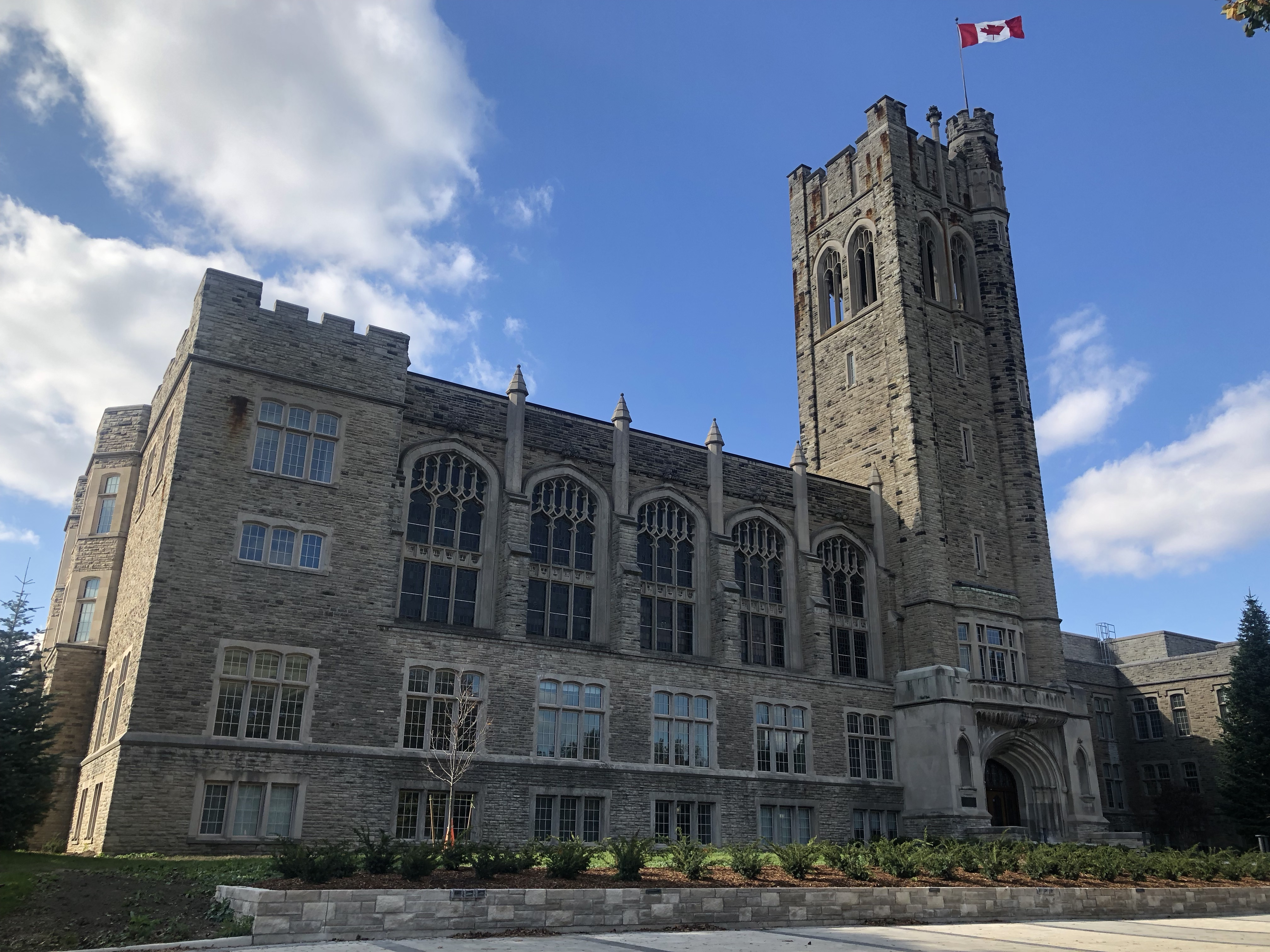
- Alternative names: Arts Building, UC

General information
- Type: Academic
- Architectural style: Collegiate Gothic
- Location: University of Western Ontario, London, Ontario, Canada
- Coordinates: 43.0087°N 81.2732°W
- Current tenants: Faculty of Arts and Humanities
- Groundbreaking: April 15, 1922
- Construction started: 1922
- Completed: Summer 1924
- Opened: October 16, 1924

Height
- Height: 130 ft

Technical details
- Structural system: Concrete, Steel Load-bearing walls
- Floor count: 4
- Floor area: 120,000 sq. ft.

Design and construction
- Architects: John M. Moore & Company, F. H. Spier
- Structural engineer: R. E. Haggarty

University College, historically known as the Arts Building, is an academic building of the University of Western Ontario on its main campus in London, Ontario. The building has become an iconic symbol of the university, as well as a prominent landmark in the city of London. The building sits atop a hill (known as UC hill) and faces the Thames River. Along with the Physics and Astronomy Building, University College is one of the first buildings that was built on the present campus in 1922. The building currently houses the Faculty of Arts and Humanities.

== History ==
=== Background ===
The Western Board of Governors purchased 165 acres of land in 1916 for development of the new campus. This proposed campus was to house a number of new buildings, dedicated to serving the Faculty of Arts. At the time, this proposed campus was distant from the rest of downtown London. More land was purchased in 1922 to increase total acreage to over 250.

=== Construction ===
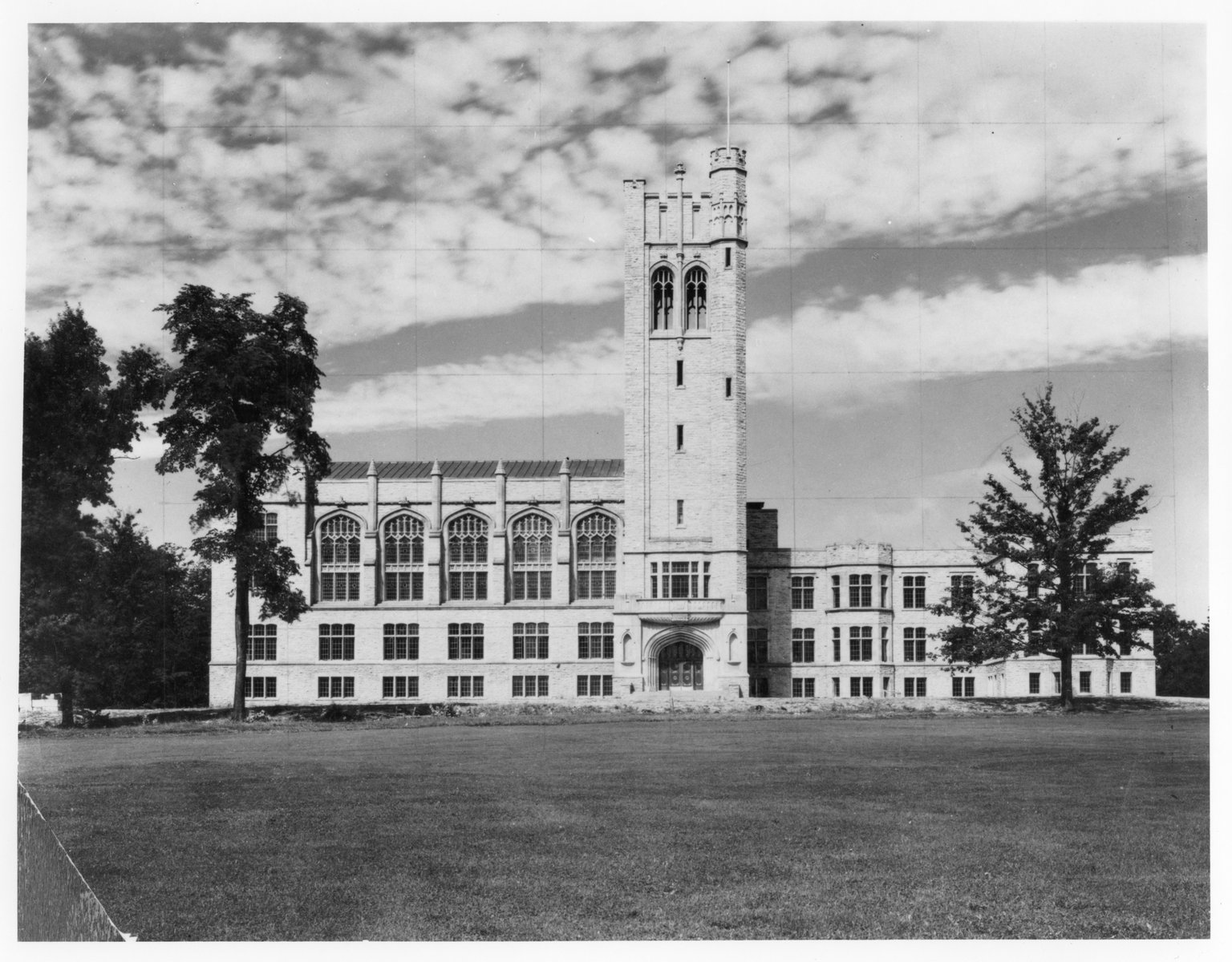
A photograph (c. 1924) of the Arts Building (now University College) at the University of Western Ontario

Construction on the building began in 1922 as part of the first phase of the campus construction. This phase included the Arts Building, as well as the Science Building (now the Physics and Astronomy Building), a Boiler House (now known as the Power Plant), greenhouses, a playing field for sports, and a running track. As well, the bridge over the Thames River was constructed at this time.

Credit Valley sandstone, as well as Indiana limestone, was used for the exterior facade of the entire building. The original interior consisted of hollow tile on the floor, with Terazzo finish on top. All floors were laid with the Terazzo flooring except for the main Auditorium, where a white oak wood floor was laid. Oak panelling lined the main Auditorium, with matching beamed ceilings. A large water tank was situated inside the main tower to facilitate the plumbing of the building.

The cornerstone was laid on June 18, 1923, and the building was finished in the summer of 1924, just in time for summer school classes to use the building. The official opening of all the buildings built in the first construction phase was on October 16, 1924.

=== Additions ===
Two major additions to the building were built in the 1960s. The West Addition was built in 1962, and the North Addition was built in 1967.

=== Renovations ===
The University College building underwent a $34-million renovation from January 2016 to August 2018. During the majority of the renovation period, the building was closed to the public. The renovations encompassed almost the entire building (117,000 sq. ft.), across all four floors. One of the main objectives of the renovations was to modernize the interior parts of the building such as ventilation, wiring, and plumbing. New open-concept student lounge spaces were added to the building.

Careful attention was given to any historical features such as Conron Hall and its accompanying stained glass windows, and the exterior building facade remained untouched. In-depth landscaping removed overgrown trees to help enhance the exterior of the building and lighting was added to showcase the stained glass windows.

The laneway in front of the building, Kent Drive, was refurbished to allow only pedestrians as part of the "Open Spaces Strategy".

== Architecture and features ==
The building is constructed in the Collegiate Gothic style of architecture. Architect John M. Moore designed the building, along with help from Frederick H. Spier. Spier's influences are seen primarily in the tower and main auditorium. The total gross floor area is 117,534 sq.ft.

=== Exterior ===
The exterior of the building is clad in sandstone backed with concrete, and uses limestone for trim features and sills. Ornate stone carvings adorn most of the doors of the building, with a large coat of arms atop the main door.

==== Stained Glass ====
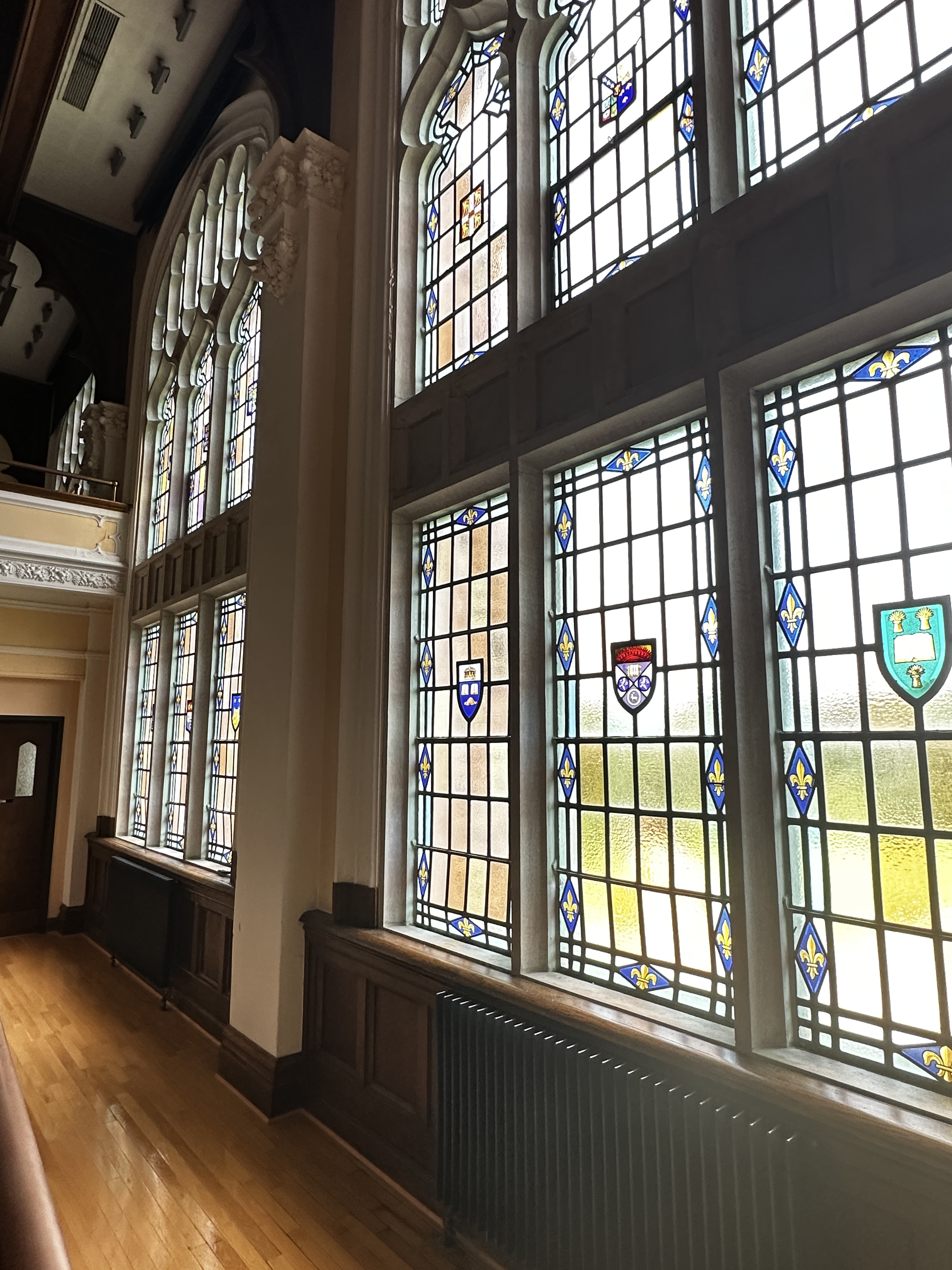
Stained glass windows rom the interior perspective. Visible in the bottom row are the crests of University of Toronto (left), University of Western Ontario (centre) and University of Saskatchewan (right).

Stained glass windows are seen to the left of the front face of the building. This glass contains school crests of other Canadian colleges and universities.

=== Tower ===
The main iconic attraction of the building is the central tower. Known as the Middlesex Memorial Tower, this tower was made in part from a $100,000 donation given by the County of Middlesex in 1921, and is a memorial to those from Middlesex County who died in World War 1. The tower stands at 130ft, with a flagpole at the top. The main entrance to the building is located at the base of the tower, along with a large plaque explaining the memorial.

The original design of the tower was done by Spier, but London architect John Moore increased the height of the belfry to accommodate a bell carillon. Ultimately, the carillon was never installed.

=== Auditorium ===
Known as Conron Hall, (formerly known as Convocation Hall) the main auditorium showcases the architectural design of the collegiate gothic style. The hall is a large space, with 650 seats. Seats span the main floorspace as well as a balcony. The stained glass windows are seen all throughout the hall, as well as the oak panelling and oak beam construction.

Graduation ceremonies were held in this auditorium until 1932.

Interior elements of the main auditorium of University College

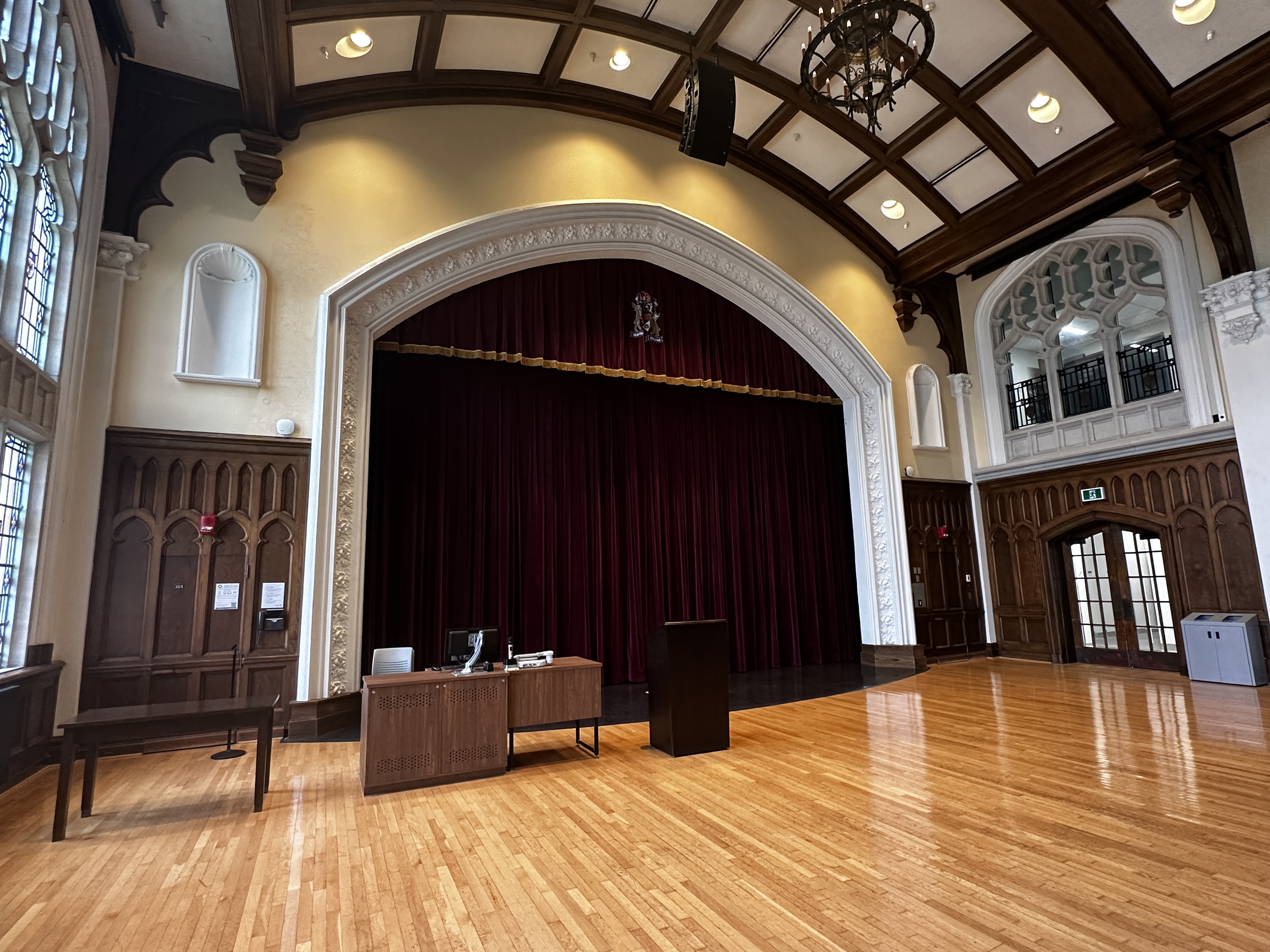
Conron Hall stage and lectern.

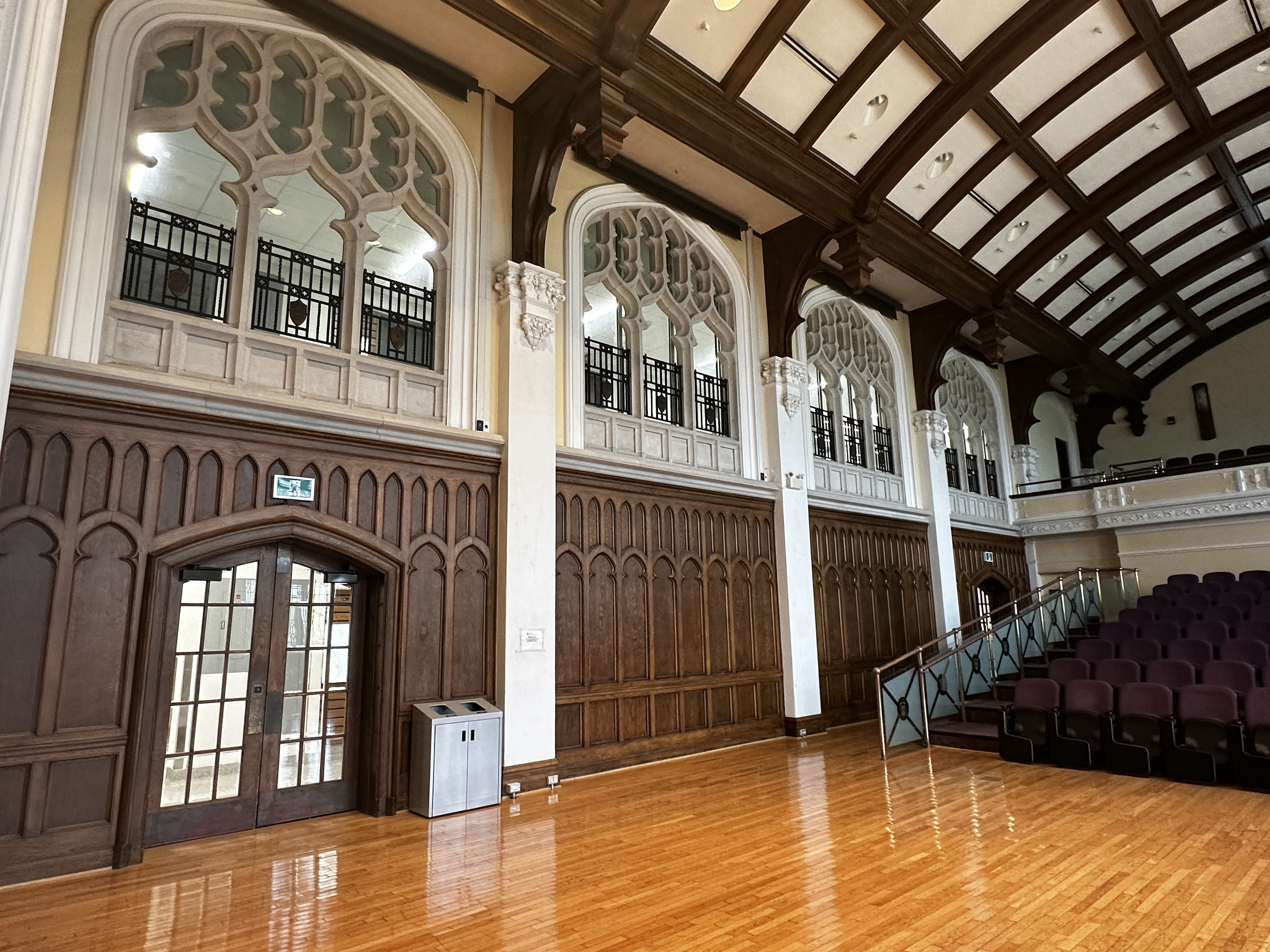
North wall with oak panelling and architectural detail.

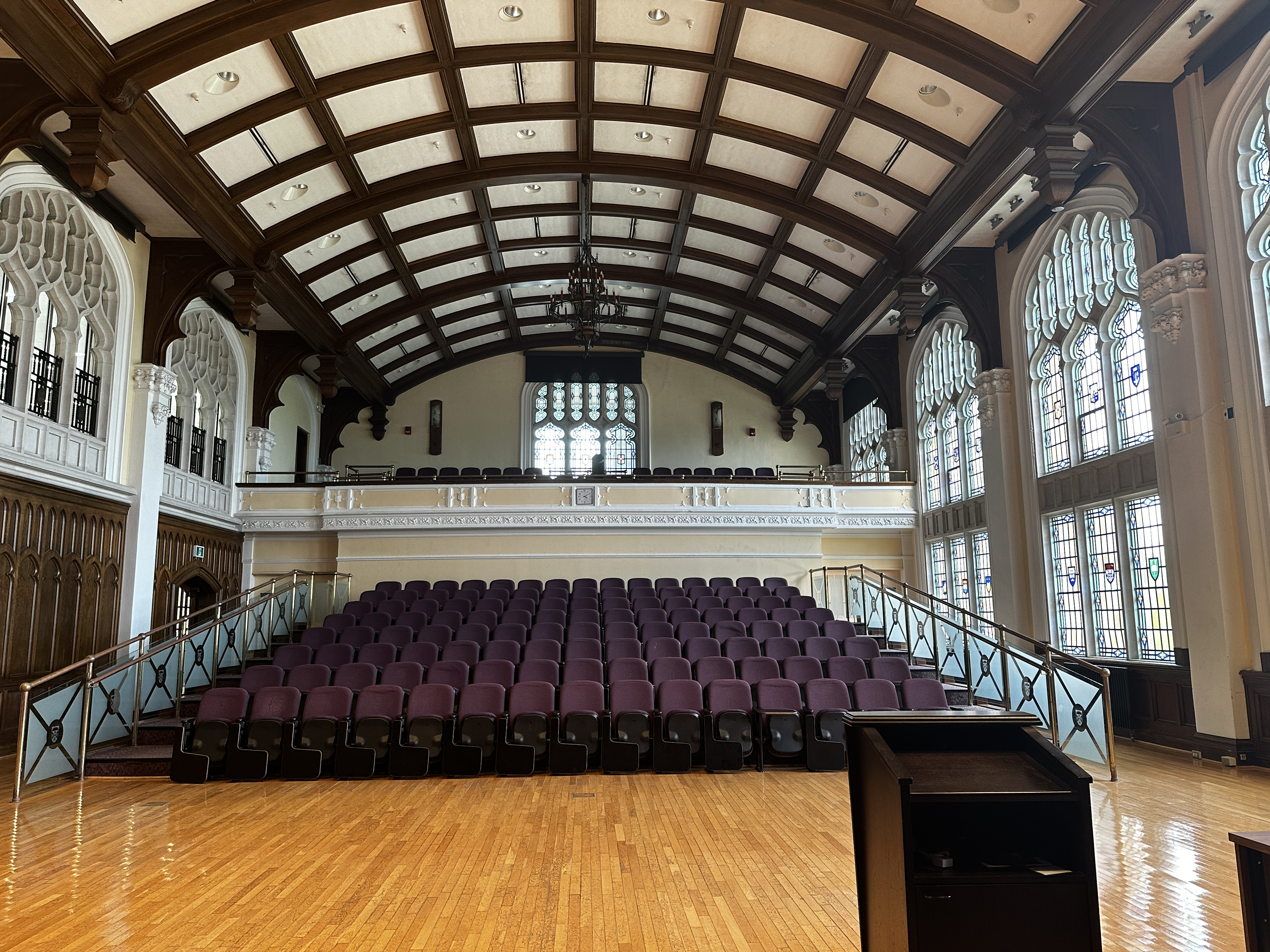
Tiered seating with balcony visible.

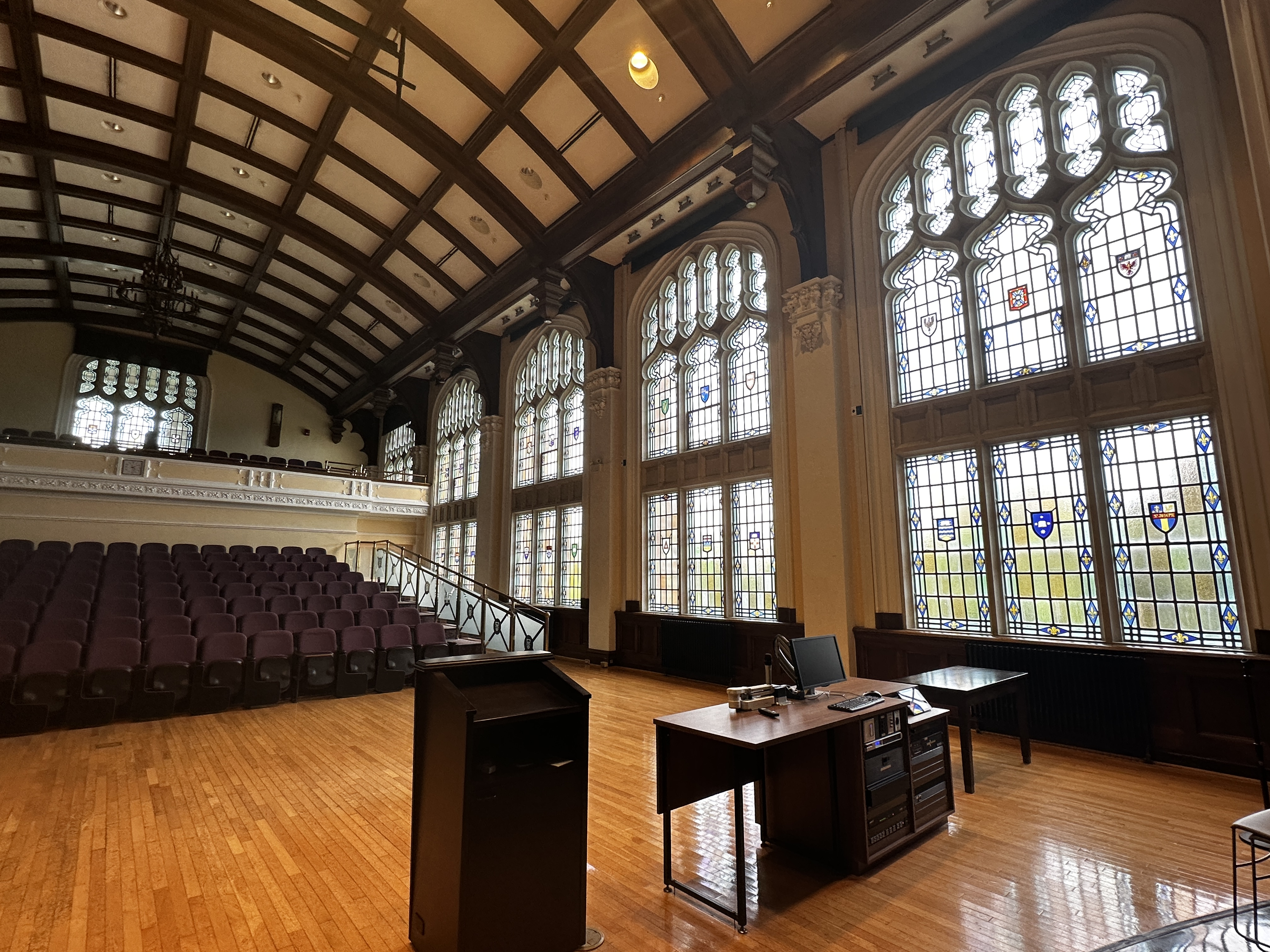
South side view with stained glass windows.
