= Foxley River, Prince Edward Island =

Canadian rural community in Prince County, Prince Edward Island

Coordinates: 46°41′33.17″N 64°0′43.24″W

Foxley River is a Canadian rural community in Prince County, Prince Edward Island.

Location of Foxley River in Prince Edward Island

It name is believed to be derived from a local river which was named by Samuel Holland in 1765 for Henry Fox (1705–1774), the 1st Baron Holland of Foxley. The river flows northwest into Cascumpec Bay.

Most of the early settlers to this community were from Ireland and the family names in the community today reflect this heritage. Fishing and mixed farming are the main economic activities in the community. There are two churches in Foxley River: St. Brigid's Roman Catholic Church and St Peter's Anglican Church.
