= Maryon Kantaroff =

Canadian sculptor (1933–2019)

- Born: November 22, 1933; Toronto, Ontario
- Died: June 9, 2019 (aged 85); Toronto
- Resting place: York Cemetery
- Education: University of Toronto
- Known for: Monumental outdoor sculptor
- Awards: President's Award, Sculptors Society of Canada (1992)

Maryon Kantaroff (November 22, 1933 – June 9, 2019) was a Canadian sculptor known for her large-scale outdoor sculptures in bronze and other materials.

== Early life and education ==
Kantaroff was born in Toronto, the child of Bulgarian parents. She studied piano at the Royal Conservatory of Music, Toronto and earned a degree in art and archaeology from the University of Toronto in 1957. In 1957–1958 she worked as an assistant curator at the Art Gallery of Ontario. She traveled to London for postgraduate studies in American Ethnology at the British Museum and remained in England for several years, studying with Eric Stanford at Reading College. Her further studies took place at the Sir John Cass College of Art, the Society of Portrait Sculptors and the Chelsea College of Arts.

== Career and impact ==
Kantaroff worked in a variety of materials including bronze, stone, metal and fiberglass. In 1962 she had her first solo exhibition at the Temple Gallery, London. She returned to Toronto for an exhibition at Toronto City Hall in 1968 and soon thereafter began an association with Galerie Dresdnere, which represented her through the early 1970s. In 1974, frustrated at the lack of a local foundry with capacity for casting her larger works, Kantaroff purchased the Toronto Arts Foundry in partnership with Al Green (Greenwin Investments). She exhibited extensively in Canada and abroad in England, Europe, and the United States. A major retrospective of her work was held at the Wade Gallery, Los Angeles (1988).

Her outdoor commissioned sculptures can be seen at J.D.S. Investments, Sheridan Mall, Mississauga (Bird of Paradise, 1970) the Baycrest, Toronto (Song of Deborah, 1979) and the Windsor Sculpture Garden (Cordella, The Garden). She was a member of the Sculptors Society of Canada from 2004 on. Kantaroff was represented by the Kinsman Robinson Galleries, Toronto.

Maryon Kantaroff died in Toronto on June 9, 2019, of complications from pneumonia. She was 85.

== Selected works ==
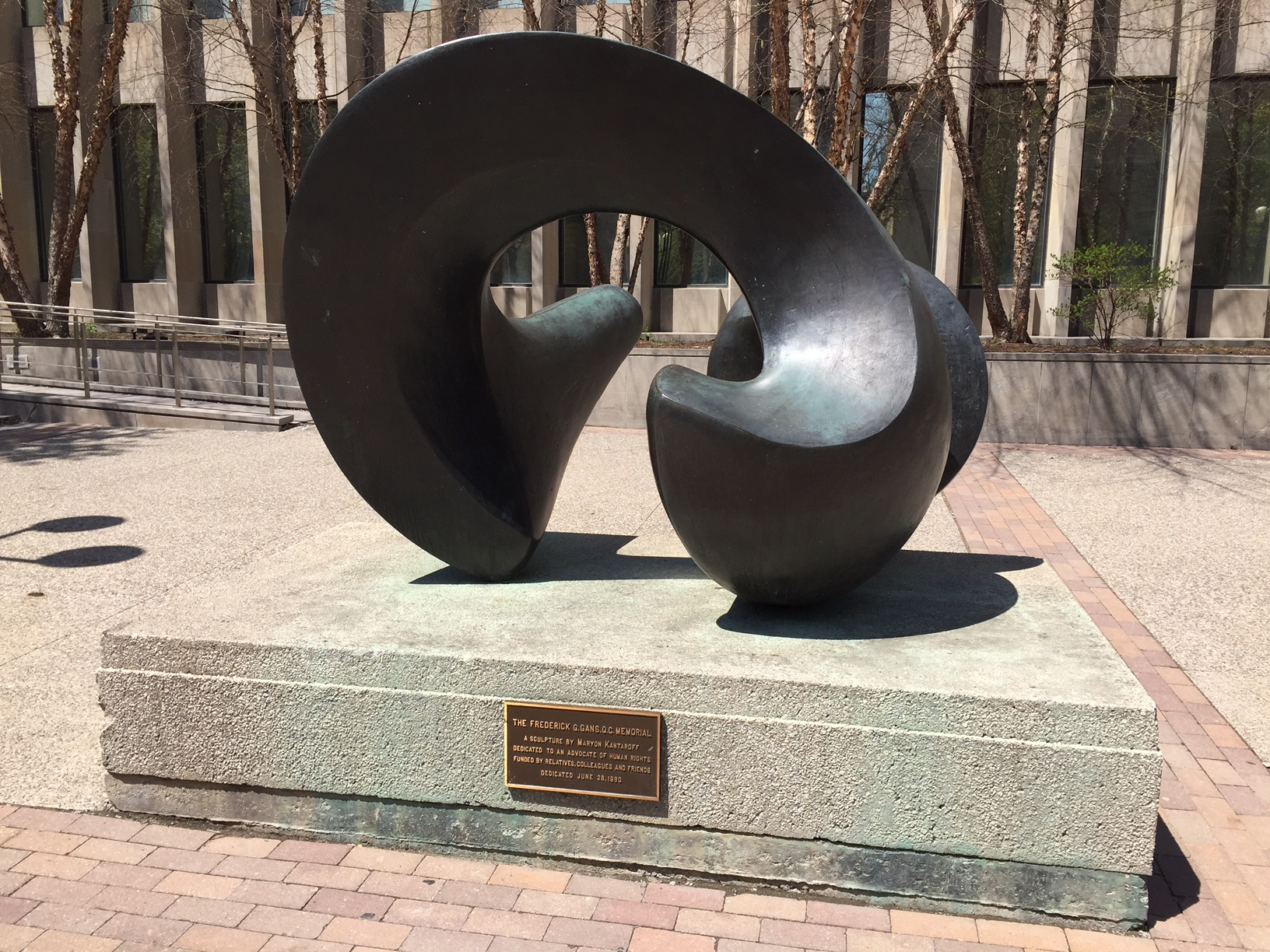
Frederick G. Gans, Q.C., Memorial, by Maryon Kantaroff

- Cordella, Odette Sculpture Park, Windsor, Ontario
- The Garden, Odette Sculpture Park, Windsor
- Counterpoint (1971), Don Mills Road, Toronto
- Greenwin (1973), Al Green Sculpture Park, Toronto
- Song of Deborah (1979), Baycrest Hospital, Toronto
- Frederick G. Gans Memorial (1980), University Avenue, Toronto
- Anodyomene (1995), University of Toronto, Toronto
- The Secret Life of Plants (2009)

== Awards and honours ==
In 1992 the artist received the prestigious President's Award of the Sculptors Society of Canada.
