= Anne Harris (sculptor) =

Sculptor from Woodstock, Ontario

- Born: July 21, 1928; Woodstock, Ontario, Canada
- Education: Central Technical School; Ontario College of Art
- Known for: sculptor

Anne Harris (born 21 July 1928) was a Canadian sculptor from Woodstock, Ontario.

== Biography ==
Harris launched her career after visiting New York City in 1974. Her first show was at the Jaro Gallery on Madison Avenue, followed by more than a dozen shows in New York City and Chicago. Her sculpture, Opus 87, can be found in the Albright-Knox Art Gallery in Buffalo, New York. Her exhibits have also been displayed throughout Europe and Asia. In Canada, two of her sculptures can be found in the official residence of the Prime Minister, 24 Sussex Drive. Additionally, La Citadel is home to one of her bronze works.

Harris was born in Woodstock, Ontario. She studied at Central Technical School and the Ontario College of Art. Her work has been featured in nearly 40 exhibitions across North America and is included in over 100 private and public collections including the Albright Knox Gallery, the Canadiana National Capital Collection, Outdoor Sculpture at Rideau Hall, and the Chongqing Fine Art Museum, China. Harris has won Ontario Society of Artists awards on two occasions.

== Works ==
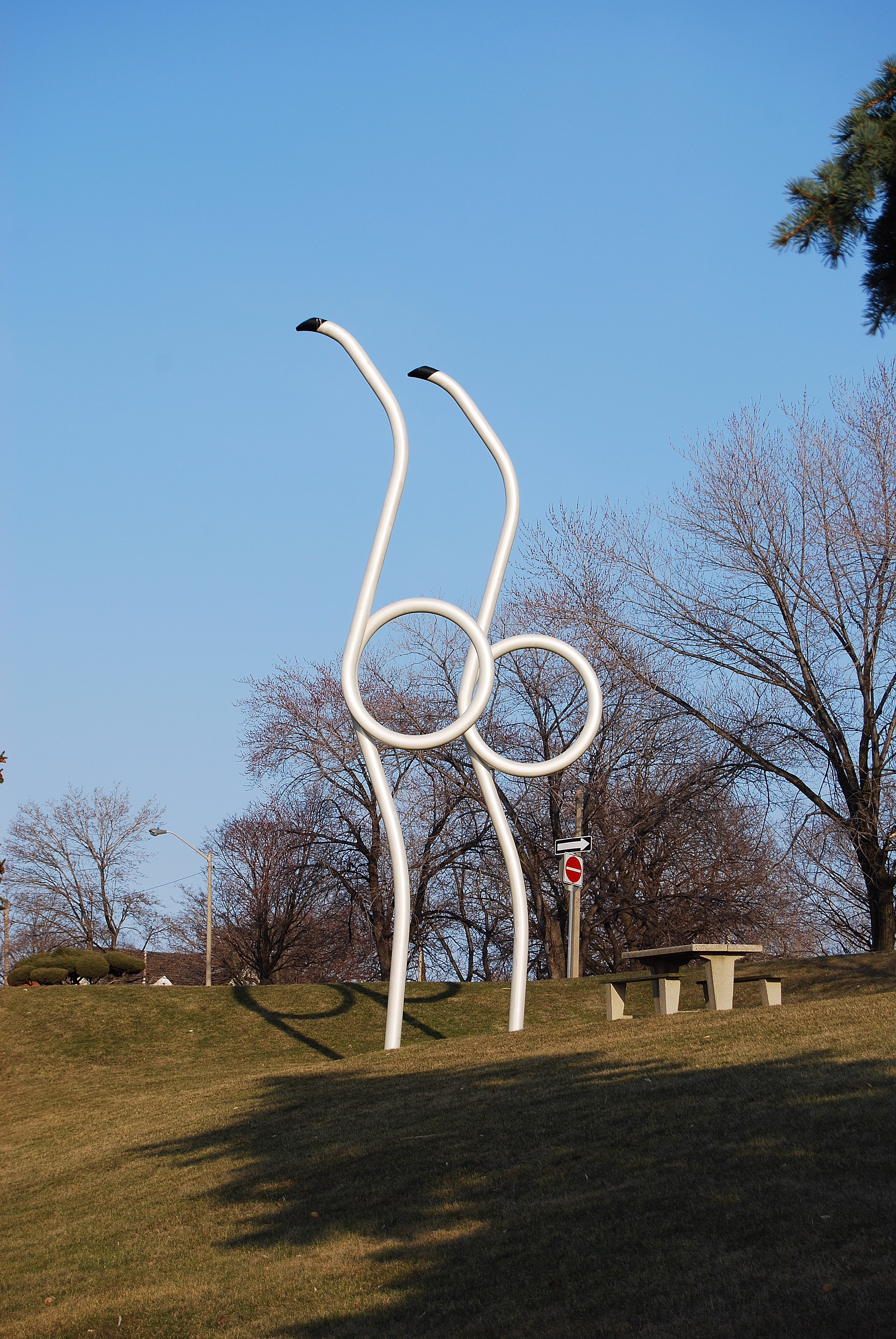
Anne Harris Tohawah in Odette Sculpture Park – Windsor, Canada

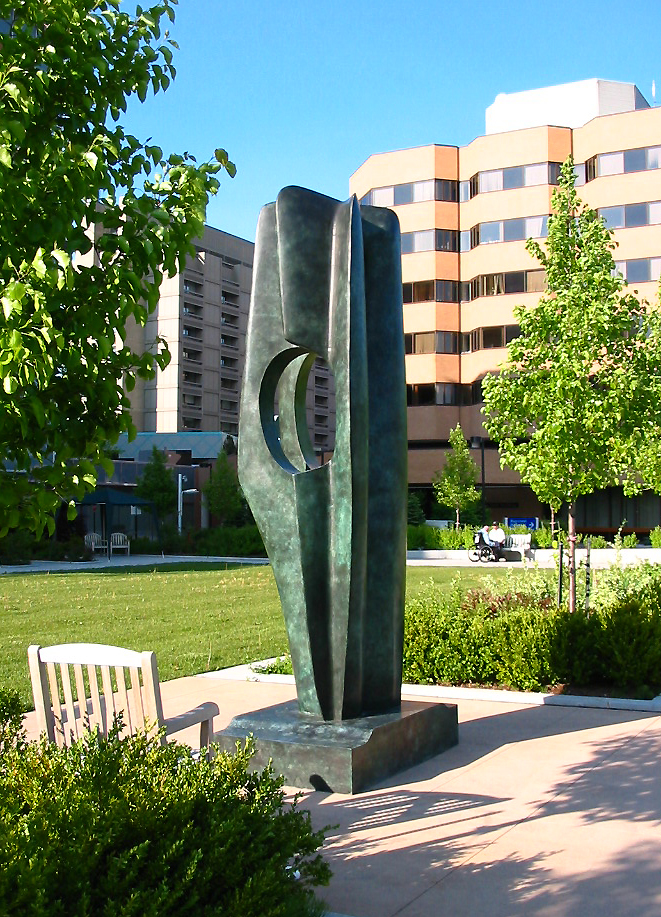
Anne Harris Passages of Life in Toronto
