= Consophia =

Steel sculpture by Ian Lazarus

Coordinates: 42°19′07.3″N 83°02′47.4″W

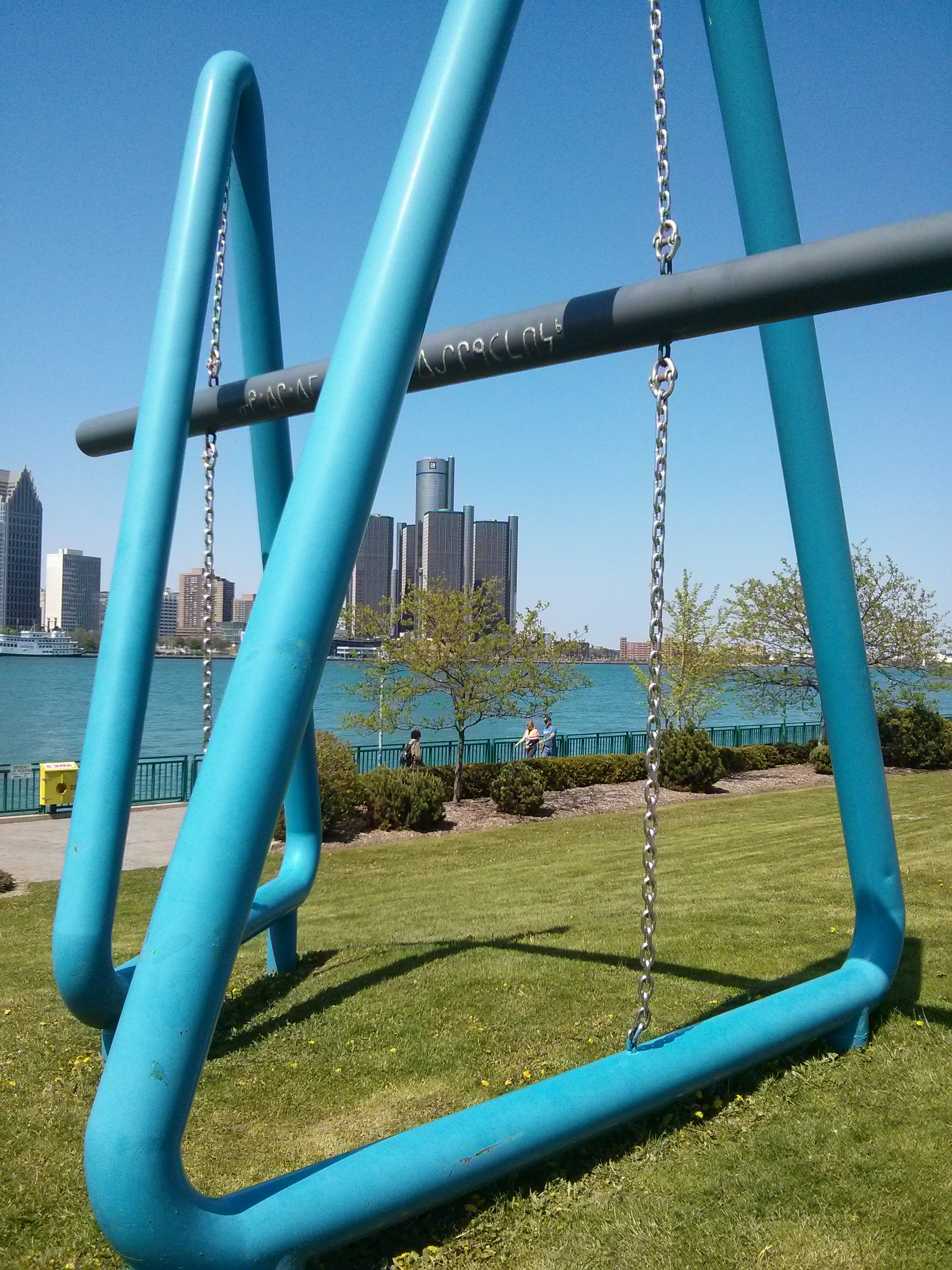
- Location: Windsor Sculpture Park, Windsor, Ontario
- Designer: Ian Lazarus
- Height: 18 feet (5.5 m)

Consophia is a steel sculpture by Ian Lazarus, located at the Windsor Sculpture Park in Windsor, Ontario.

Lazarus's 18-foot-tall sculpture represents communication across borders. The Native Ojibway script translates to sharing knowledge as well as inspired interaction, referring to the proximity of Windsor with Detroit.
