= Windsor Sculpture Park =

Open space in Windsor, Ontario, Canada

Coordinates: 42°18′40″N 83°4′6″W

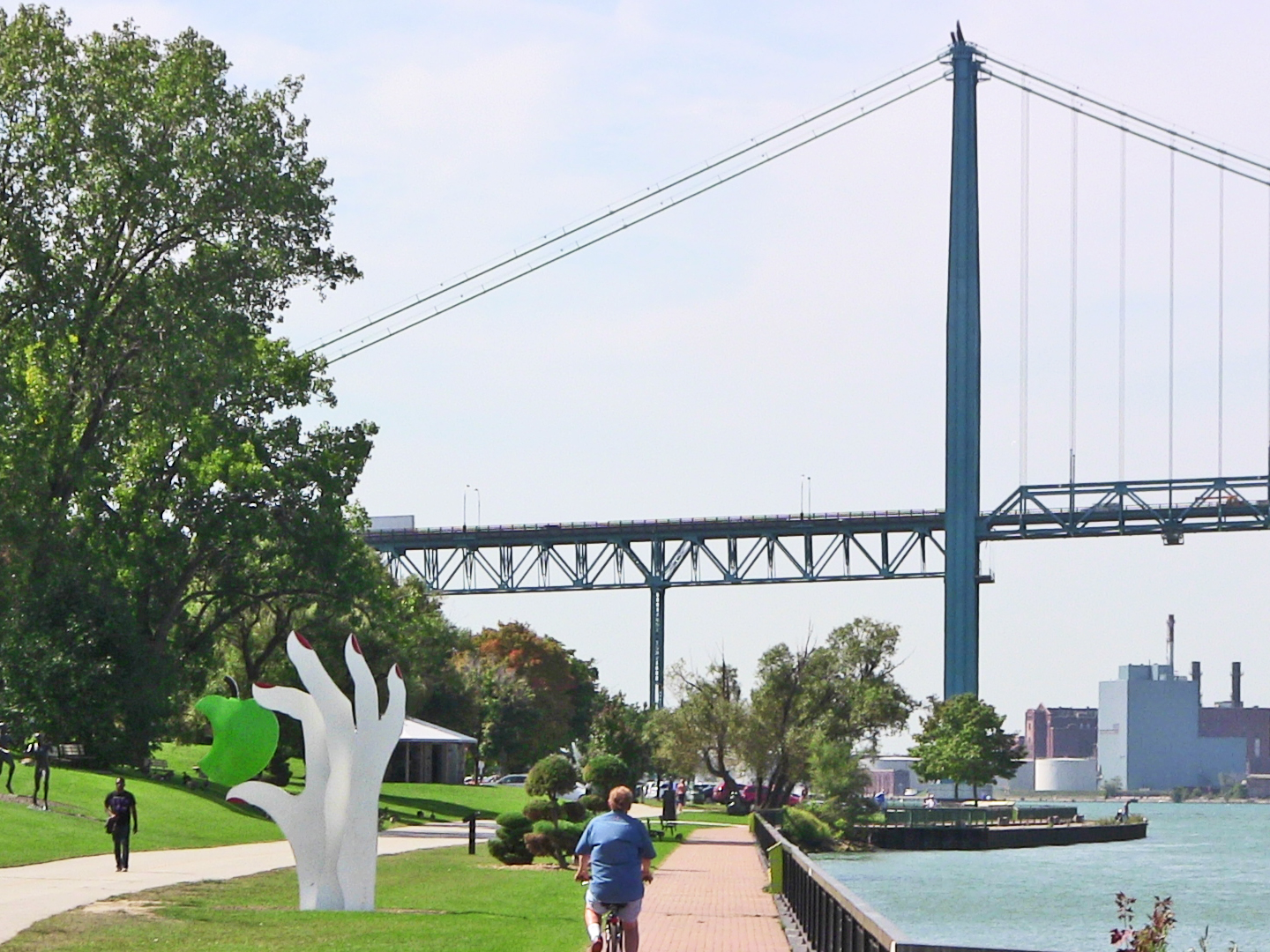
The park with Ambassador Bridge behind

The Windsor Sculpture Park, formerly known as the Odette Sculpture Park, is an open space in Windsor, Ontario, Canada, that shows 35 large-scale contemporary sculptures by artists including Elisabeth Frink, Gerald Gladstone, and Sorel Etrog.

The park is located on the shore of the Detroit River, spanning from Assumption Park to Centennial Park, between the Ambassador Bridge (Huron Church Road) and the Art Gallery of Windsor (Church Street).

The Sculpture Park was funded by Mr and Mrs Louis Odette and the P & L Odette Foundation. The park is maintained by the city's Parks and Recreation Department, while the sculptures are cared for by the Cultural Affairs Department.

== Works ==
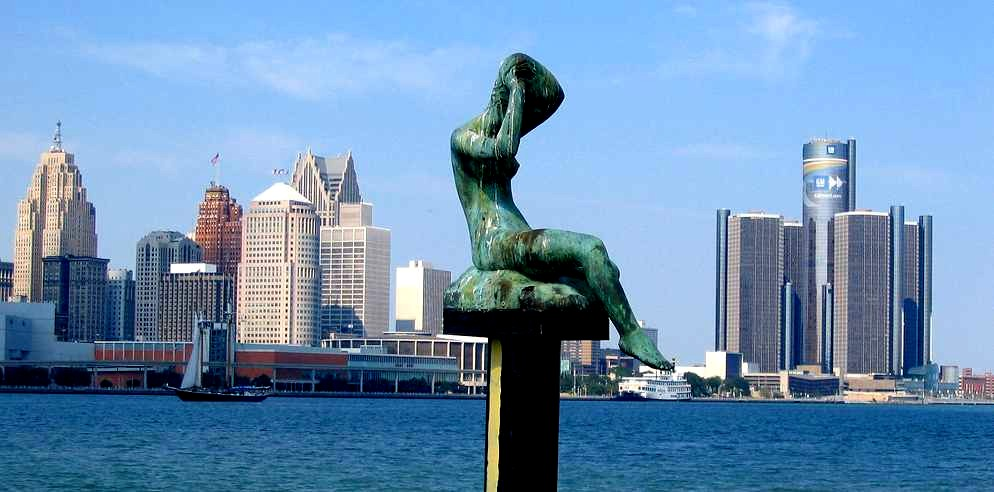
Anne, Leo Mol

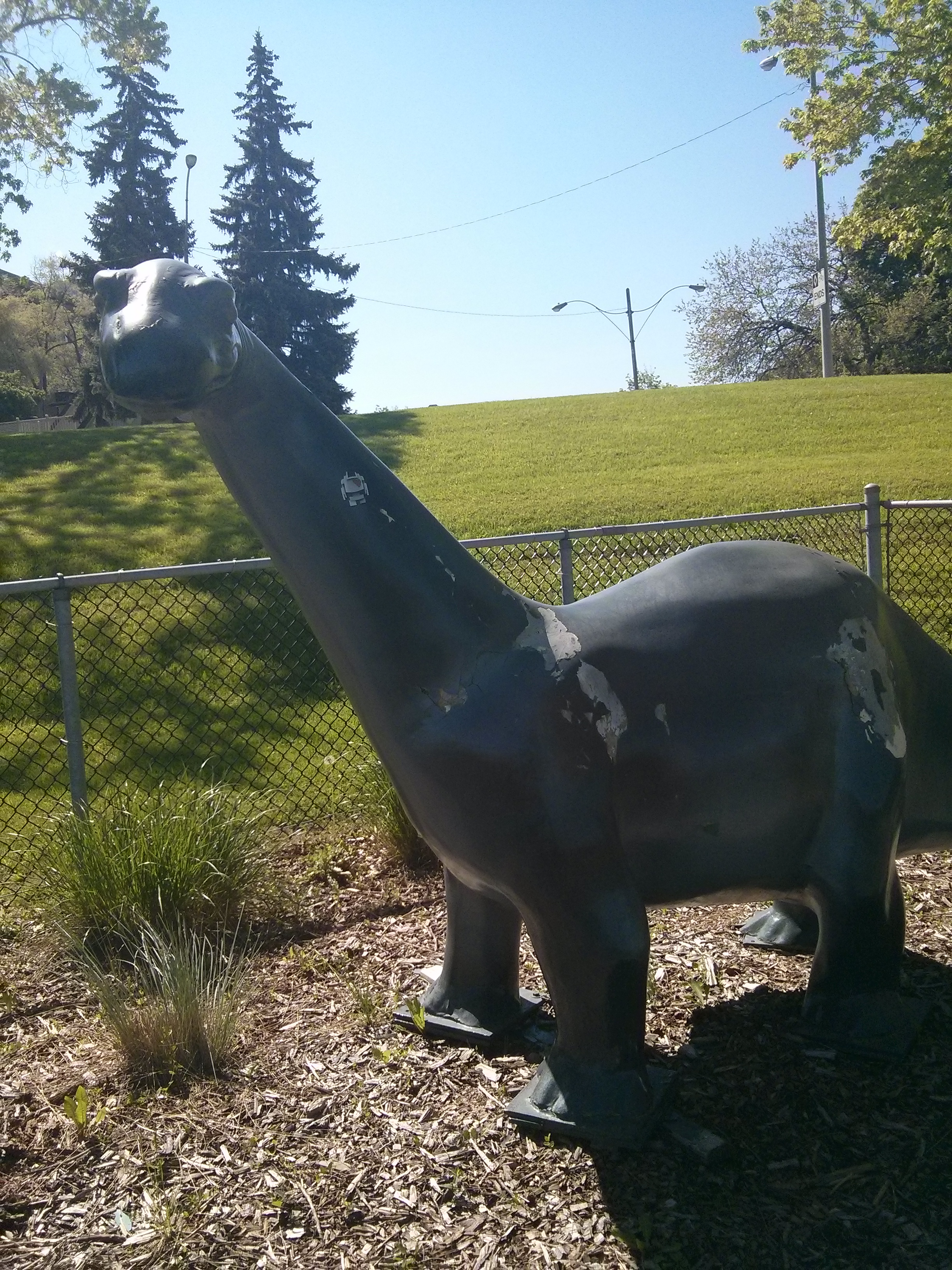
Apatosaurus

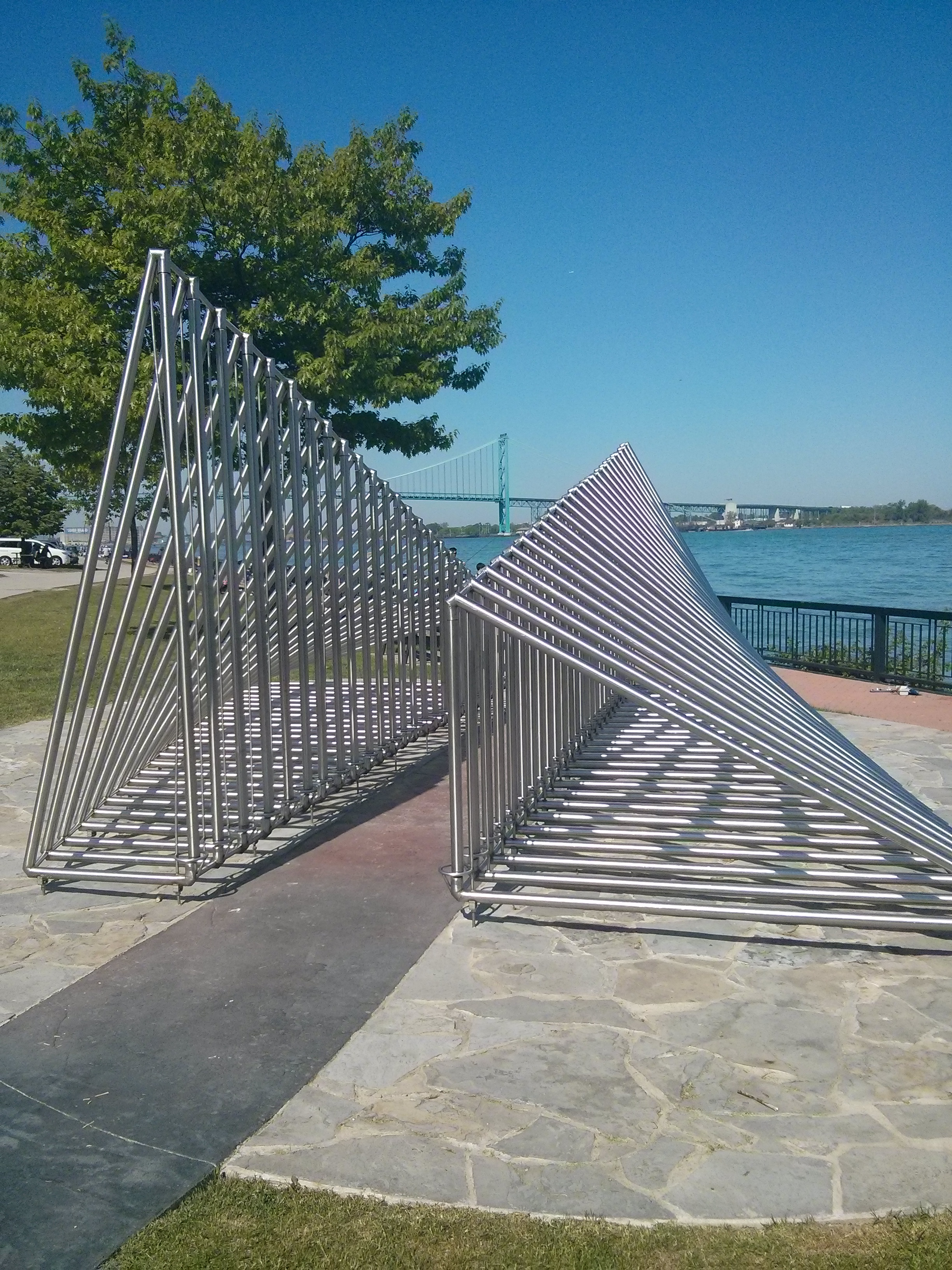
Audio Corridor, Ian Lazarus

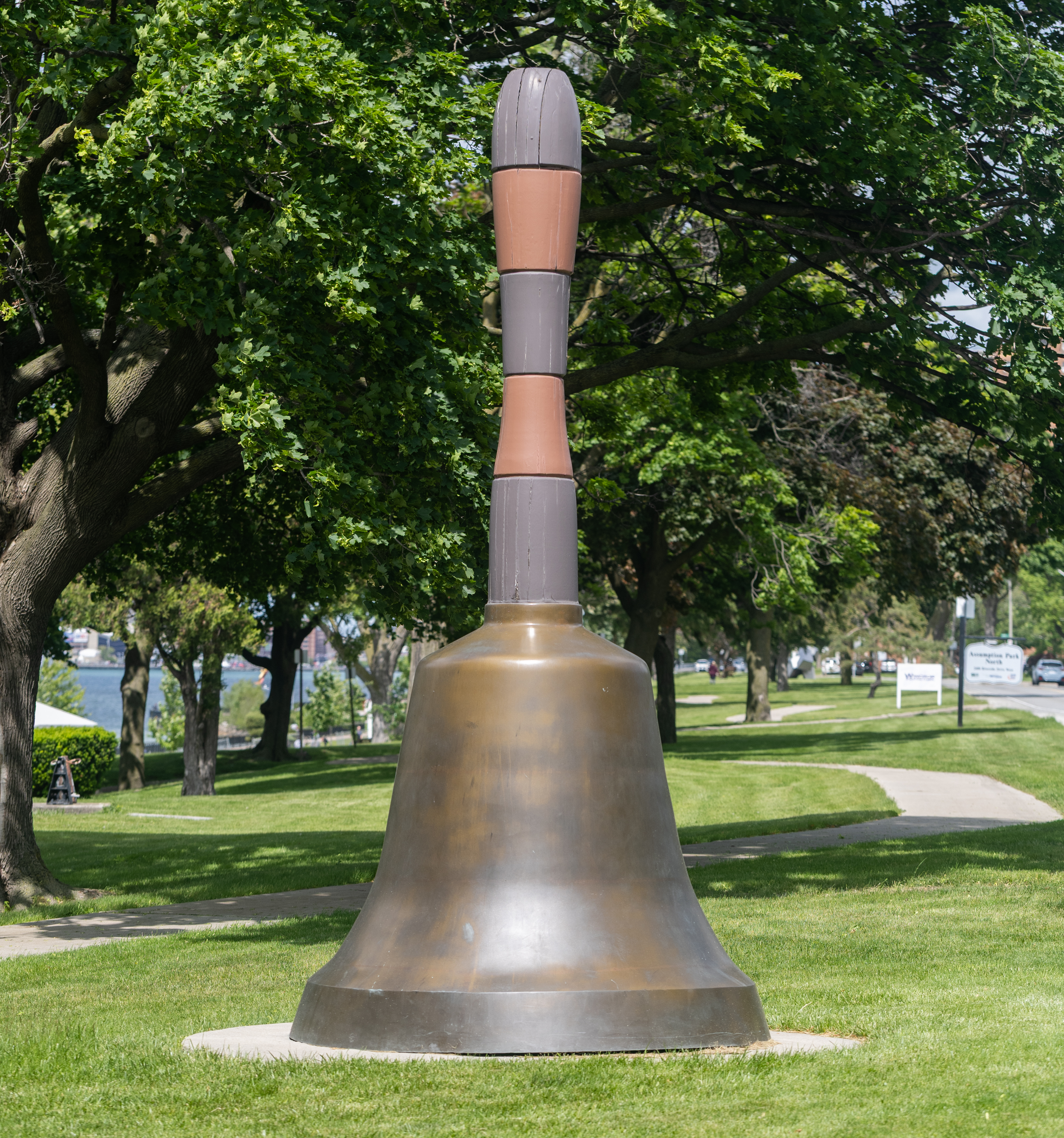
Bell Measure, Stephen Cruise

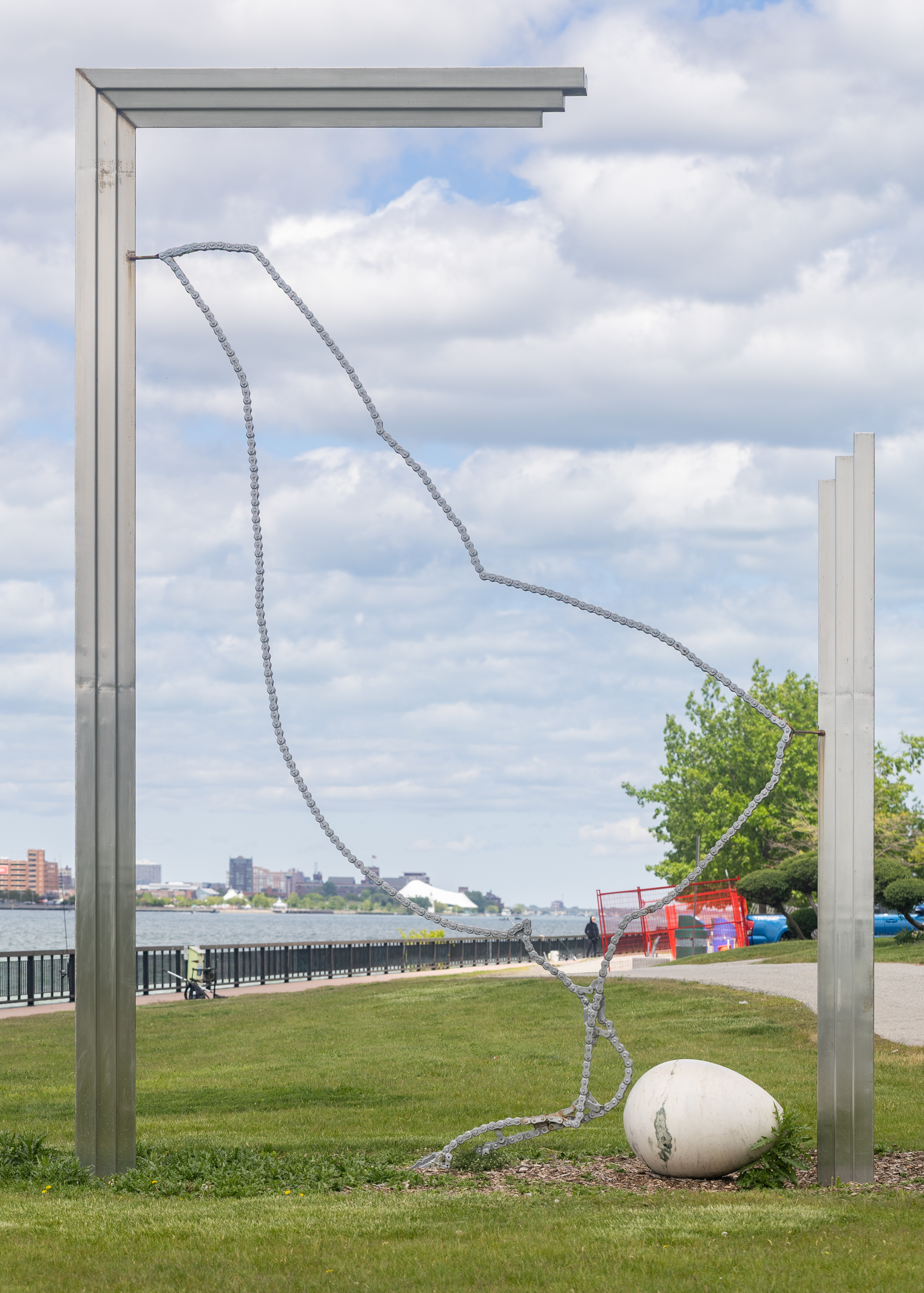
Chicken and Egg, Morton Katz

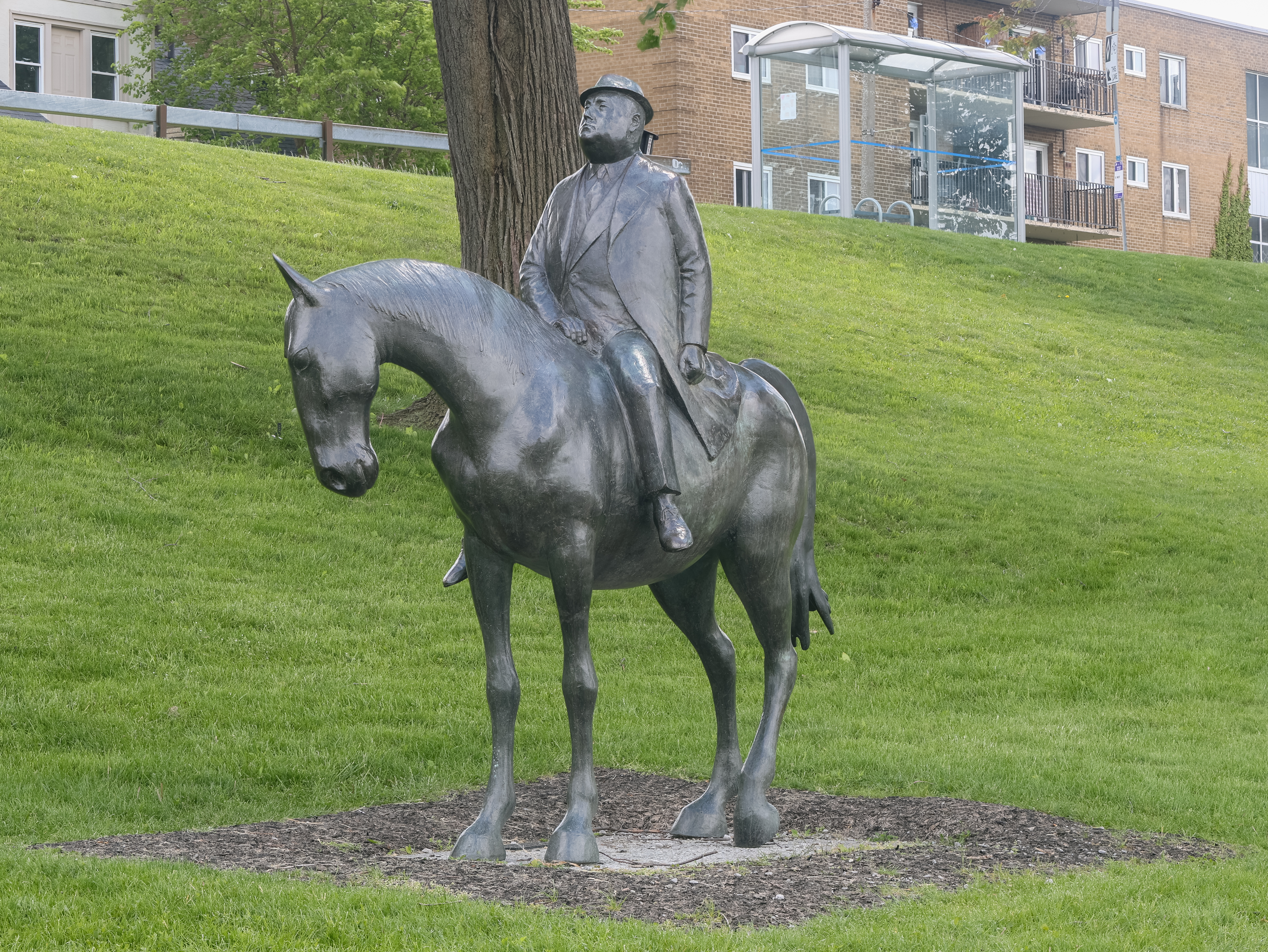
Business Man on a Horse, William McElcheran

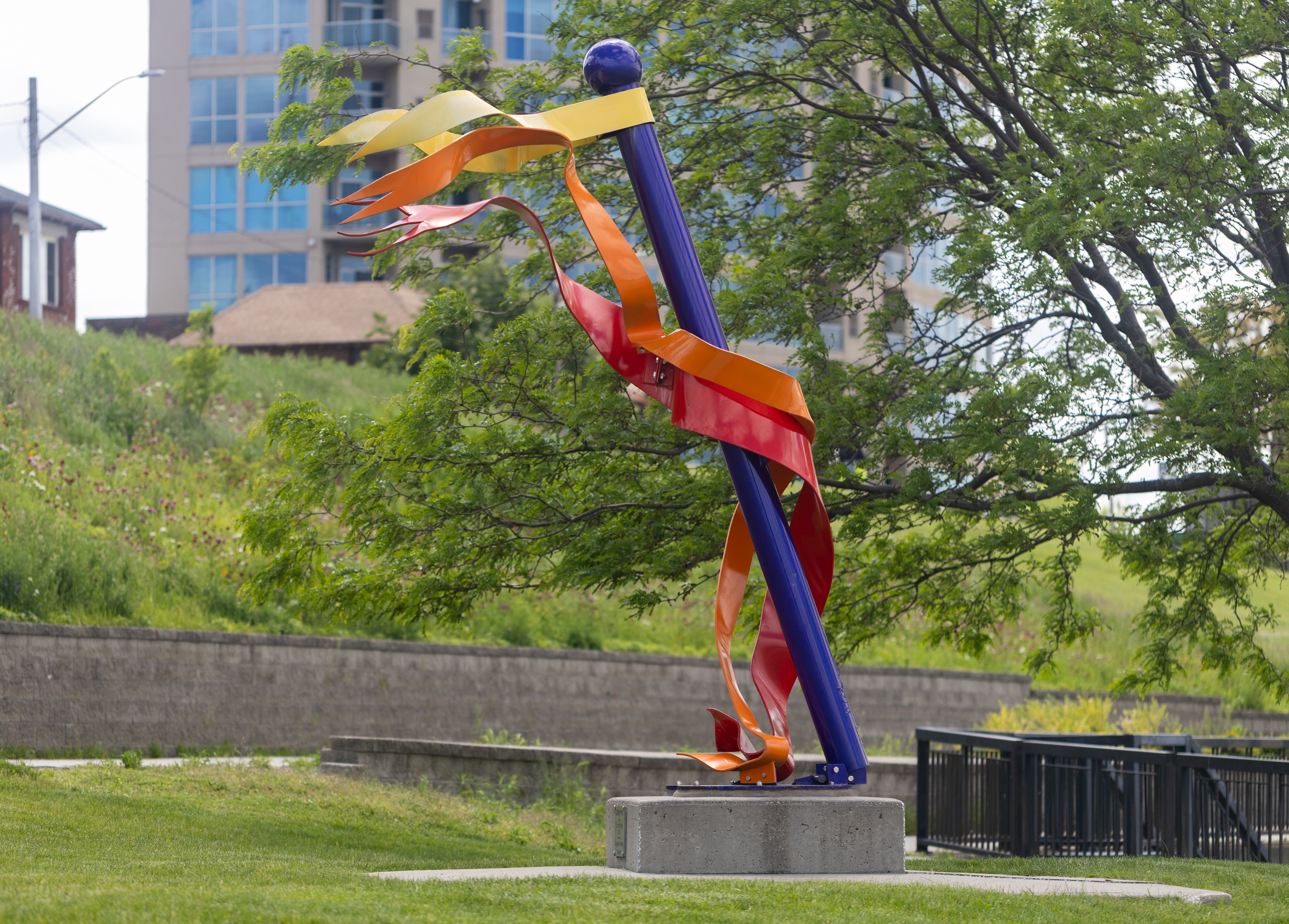
Claim Post, Scott McKay

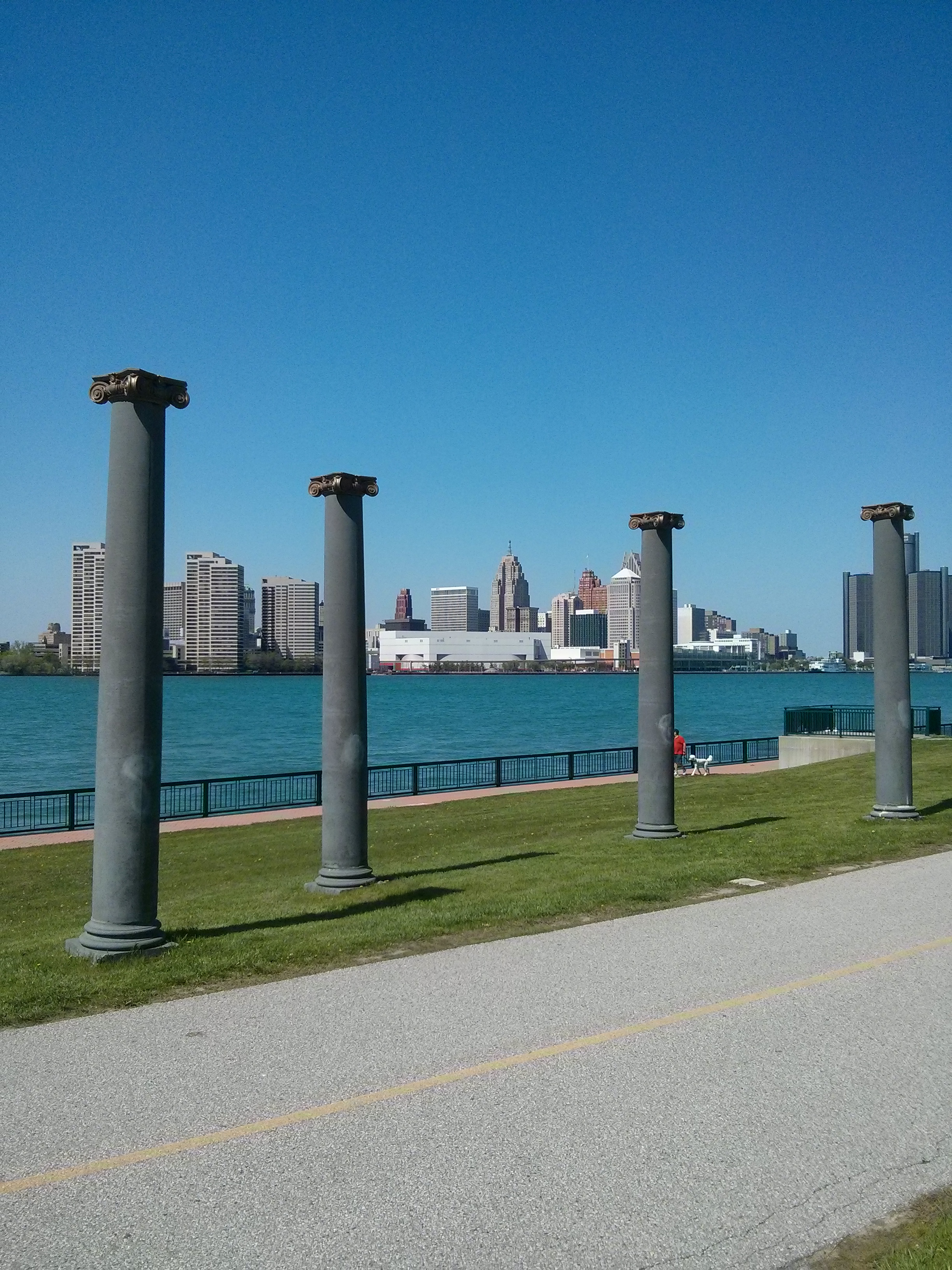
The Columns, Ronald Zerafa

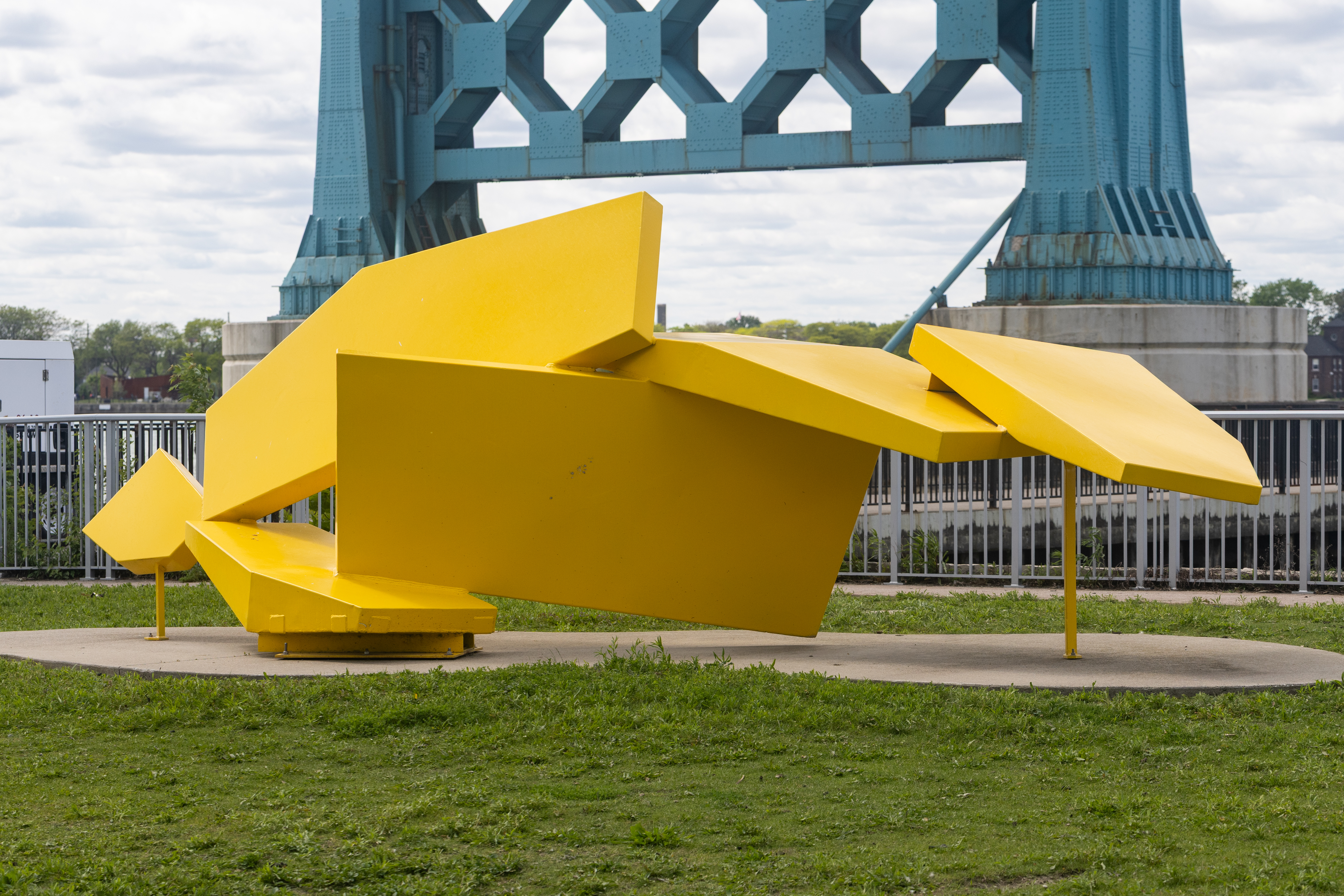
Composition with Five Elements, Haydn Llewellyn Davies

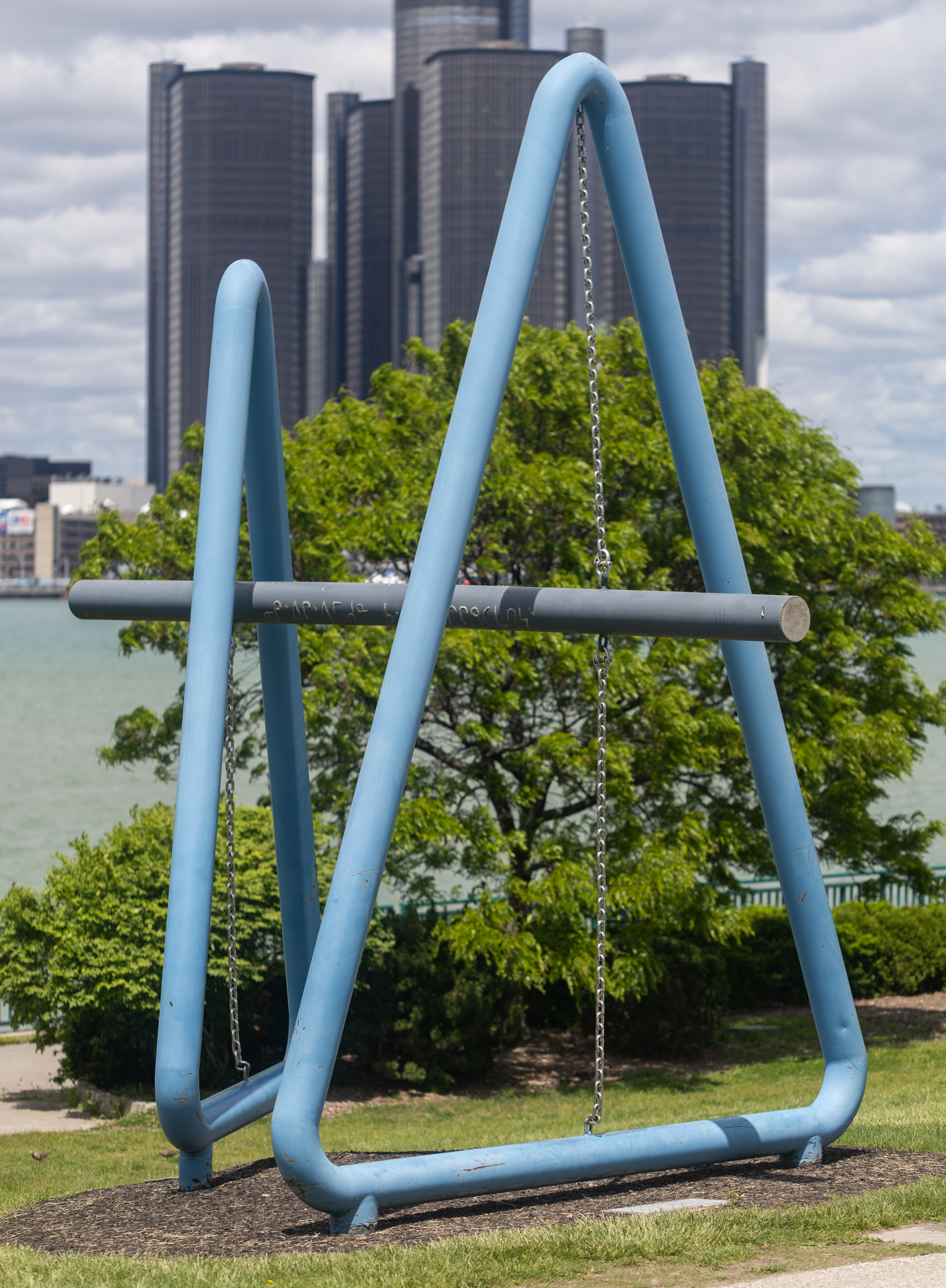
Consophia, Ian Lazarus

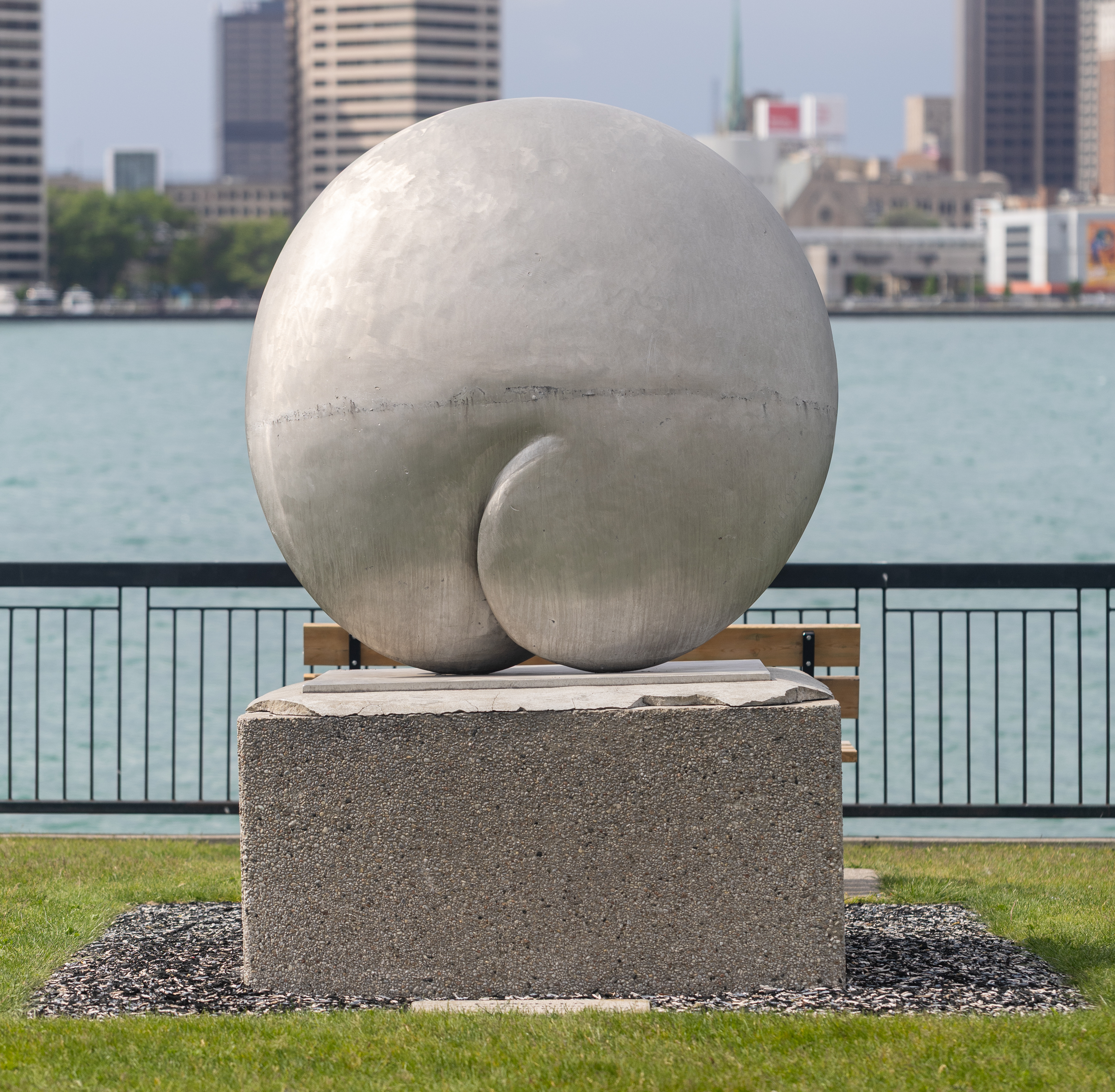
Cordella, Maryon Kantaroff

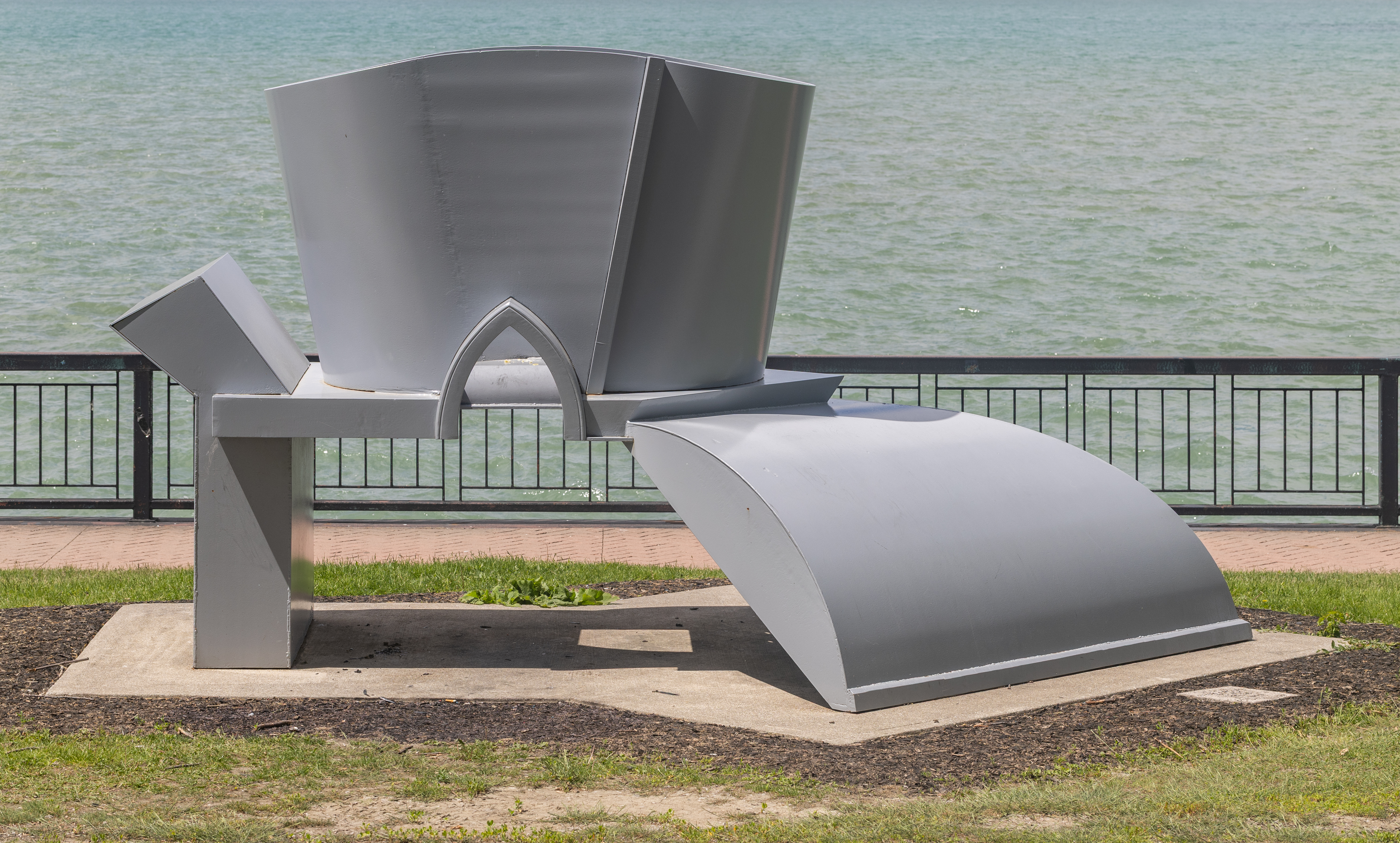
Ground to Ask the Sky, Royden Mills

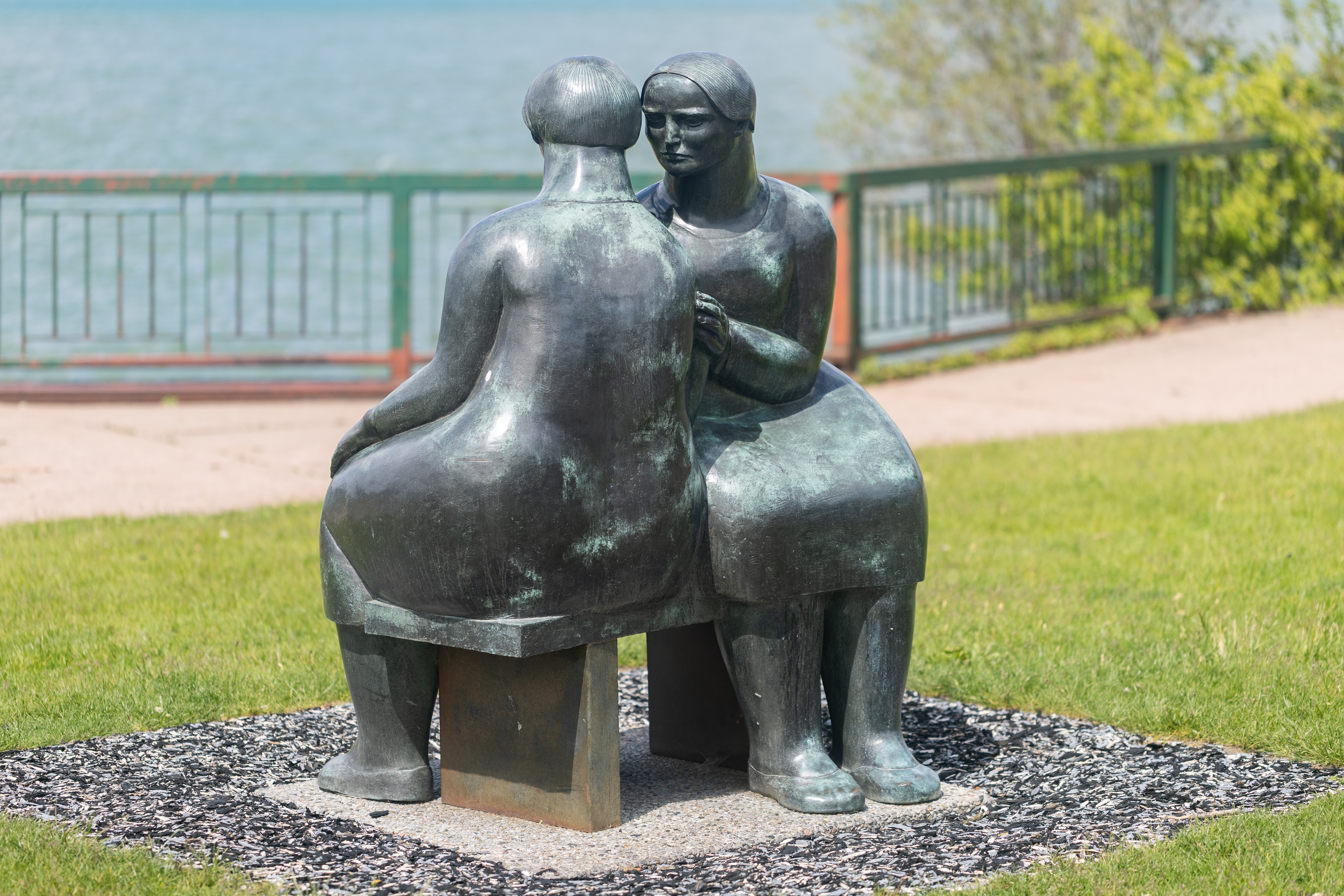
Consolation, Joe Rosenthal

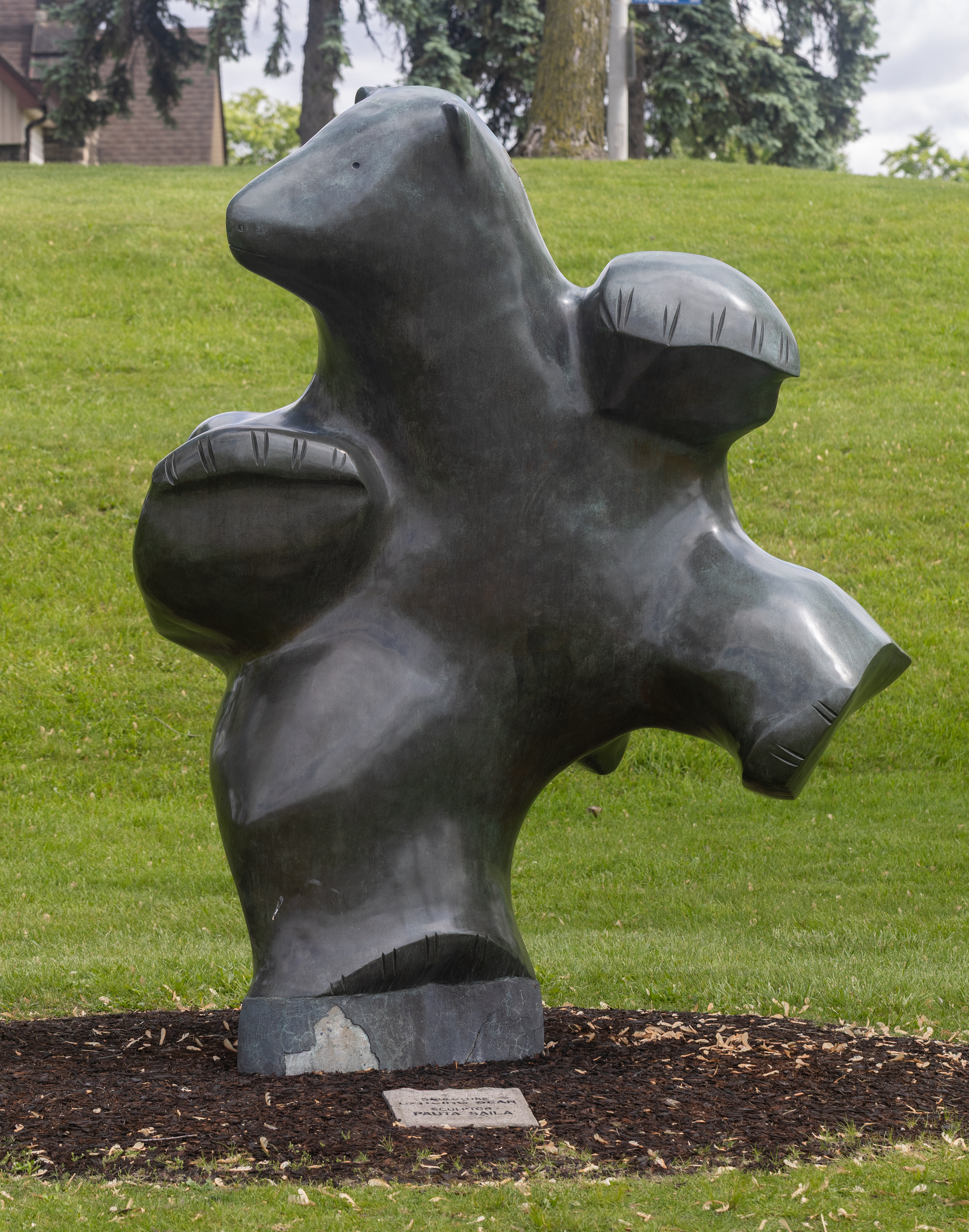
Dancing Bear, Pauta Saila

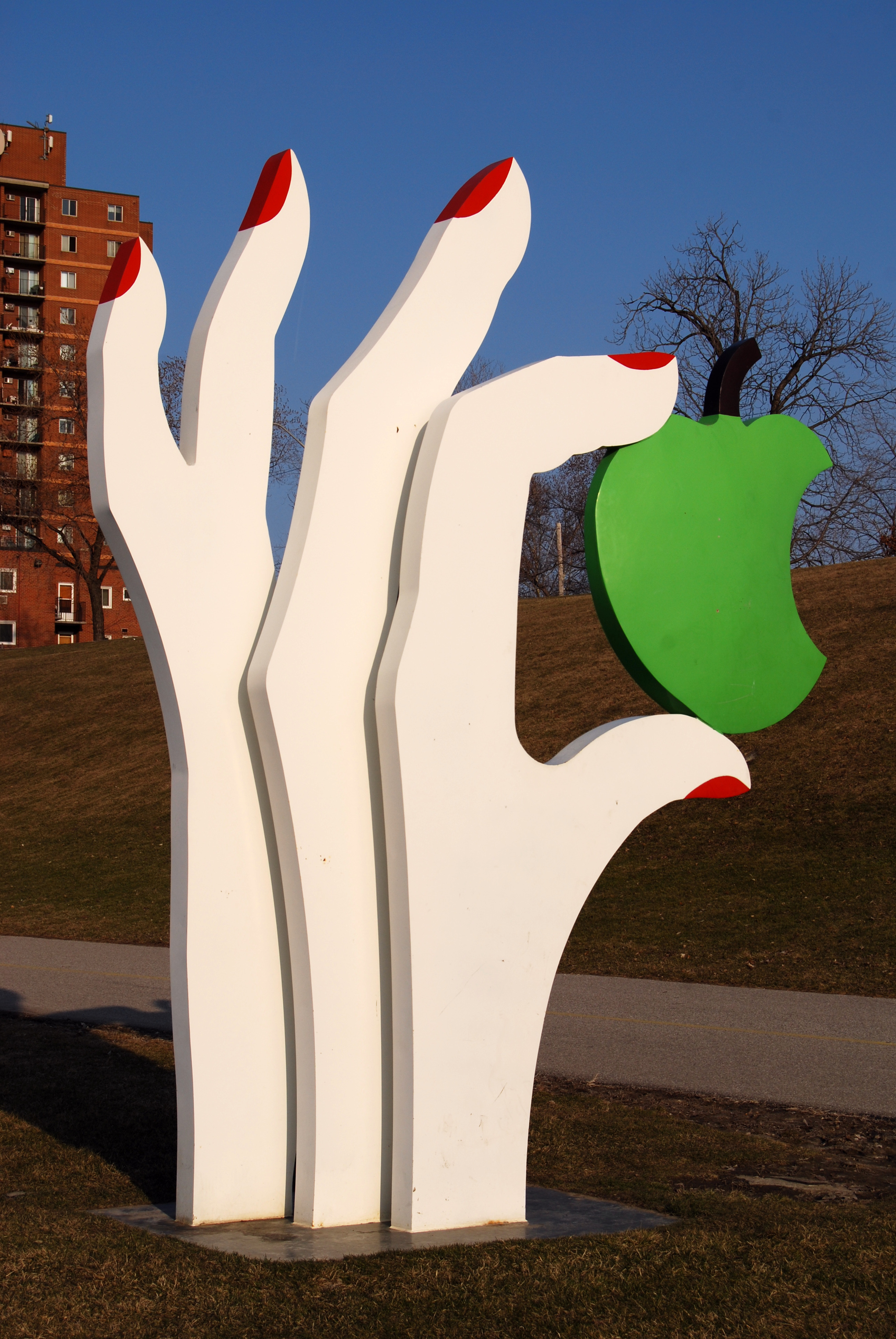
Eve's Apple, Edwina Sandys

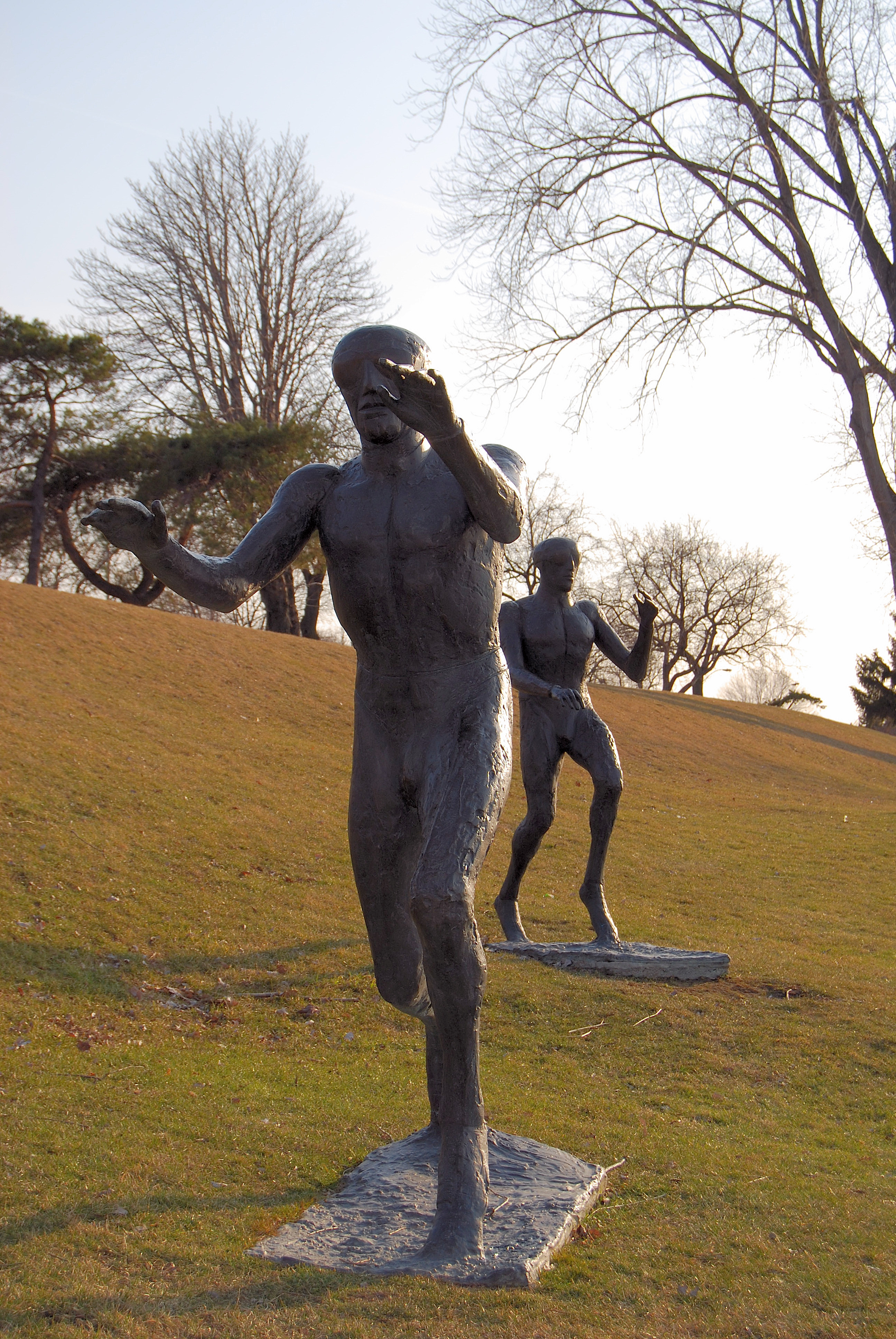
Flying Men, Elisabeth Frink

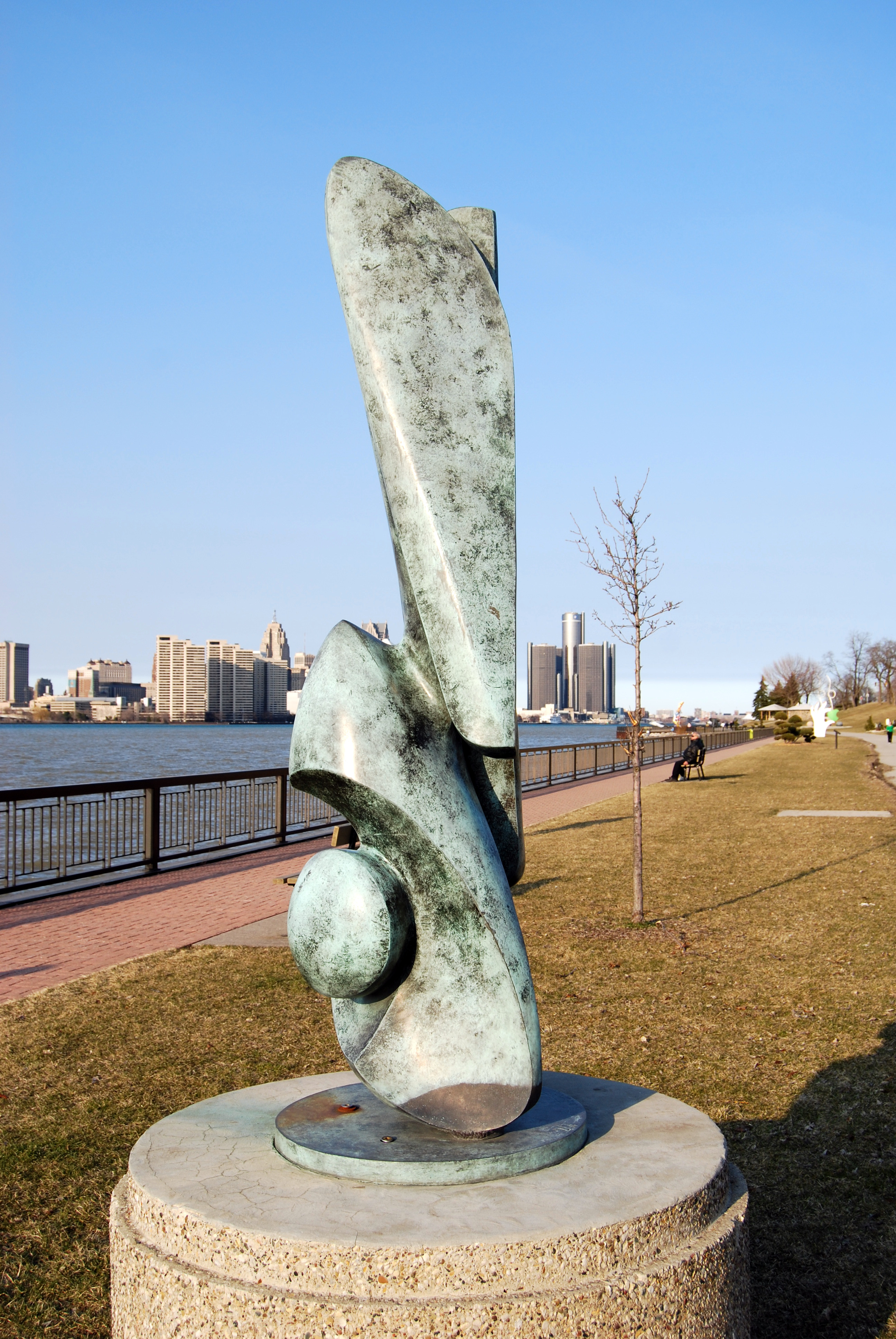
The Garden, Maryon Kantaroff

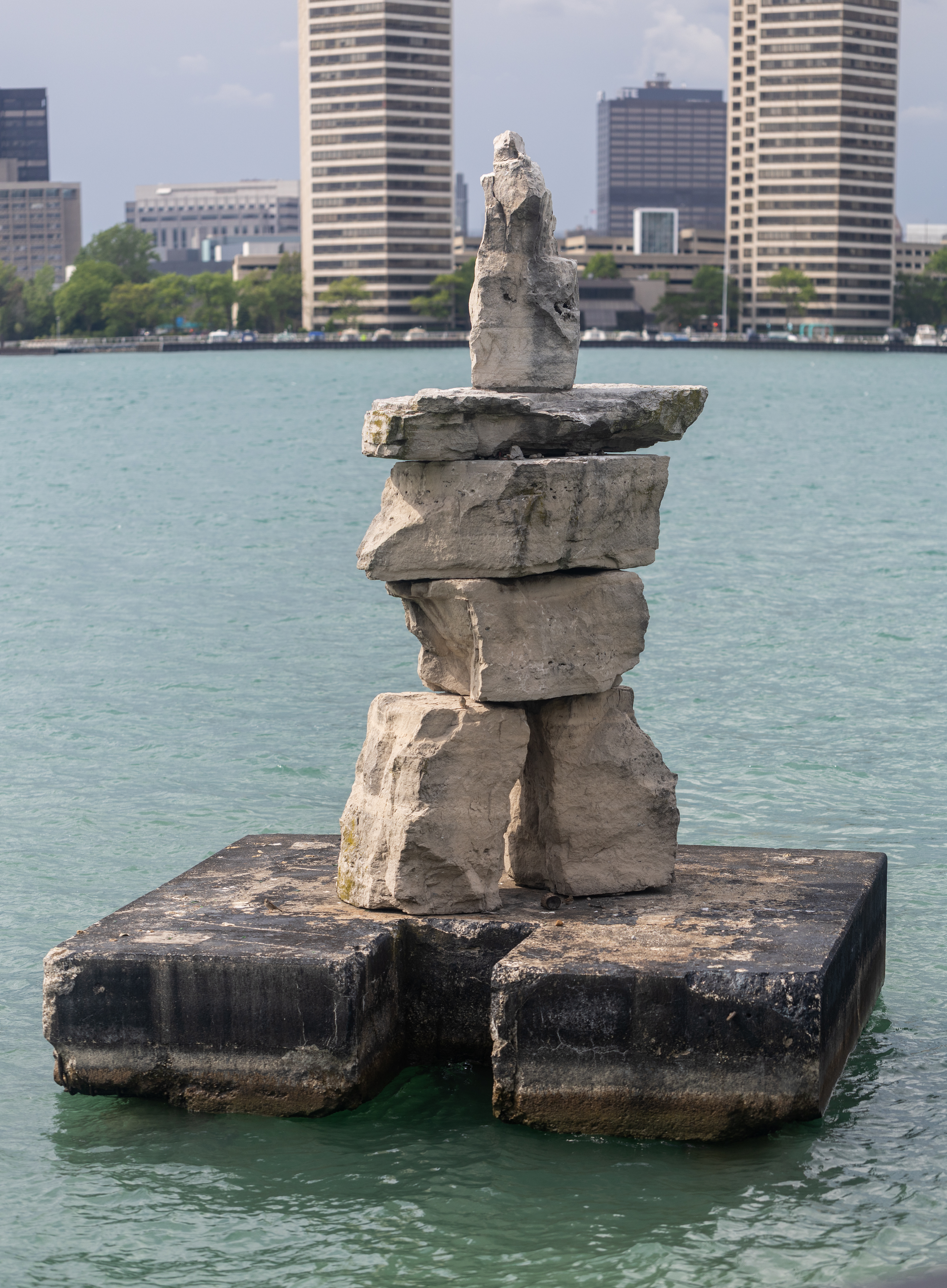
Inukshuk

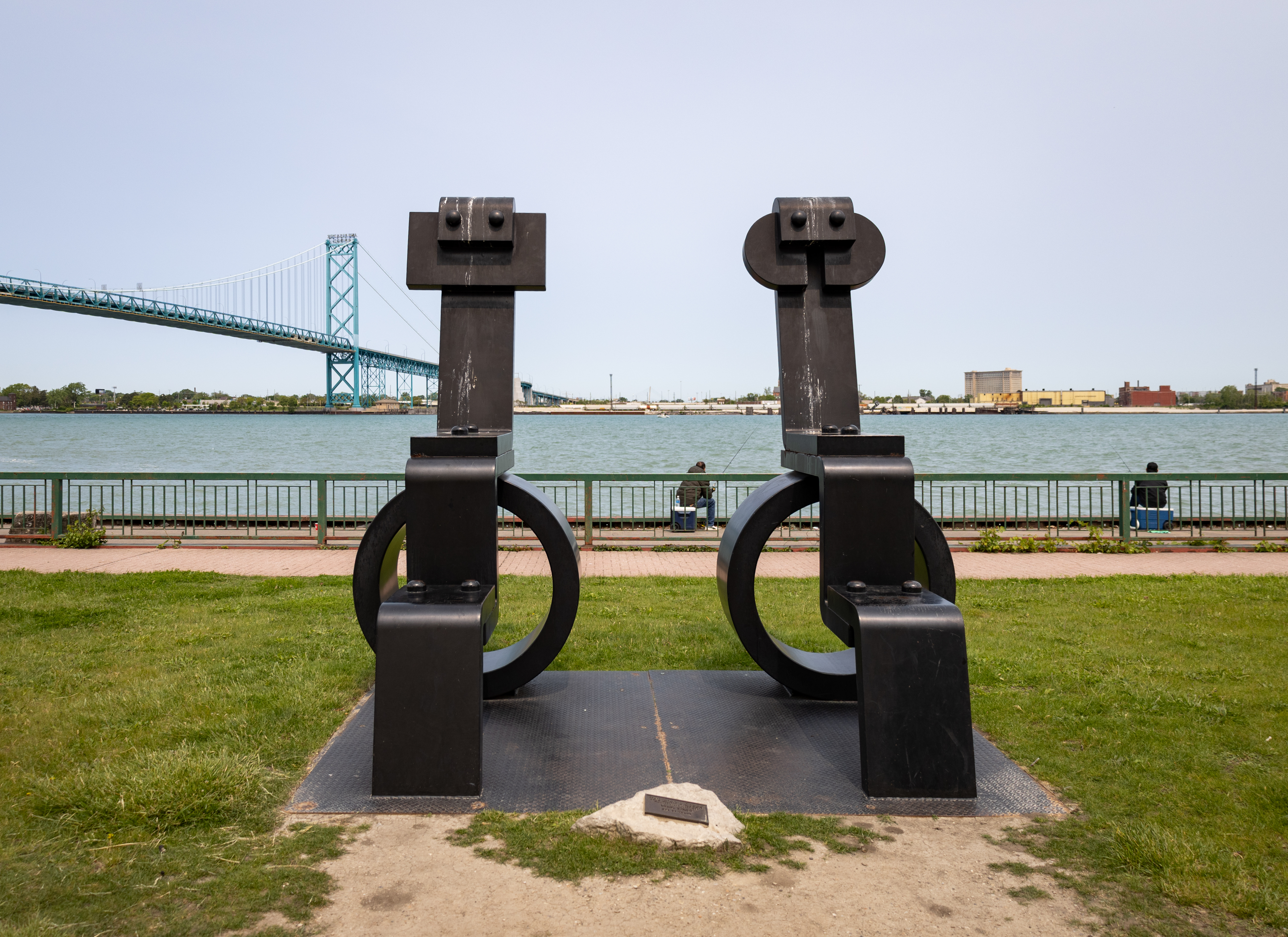
King and Queen, Sorel Etrog

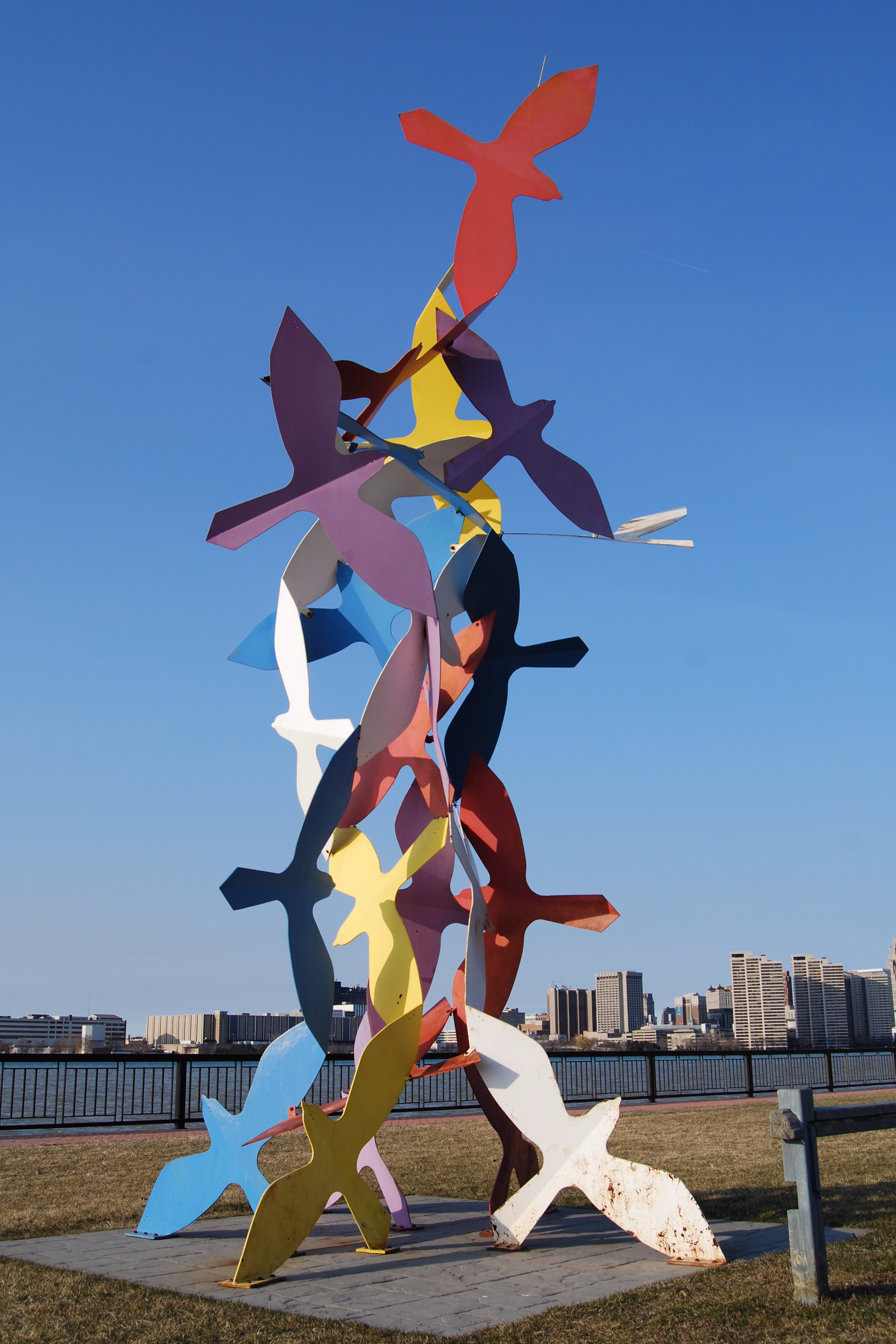
Morning Flight, Gerald Gladstone

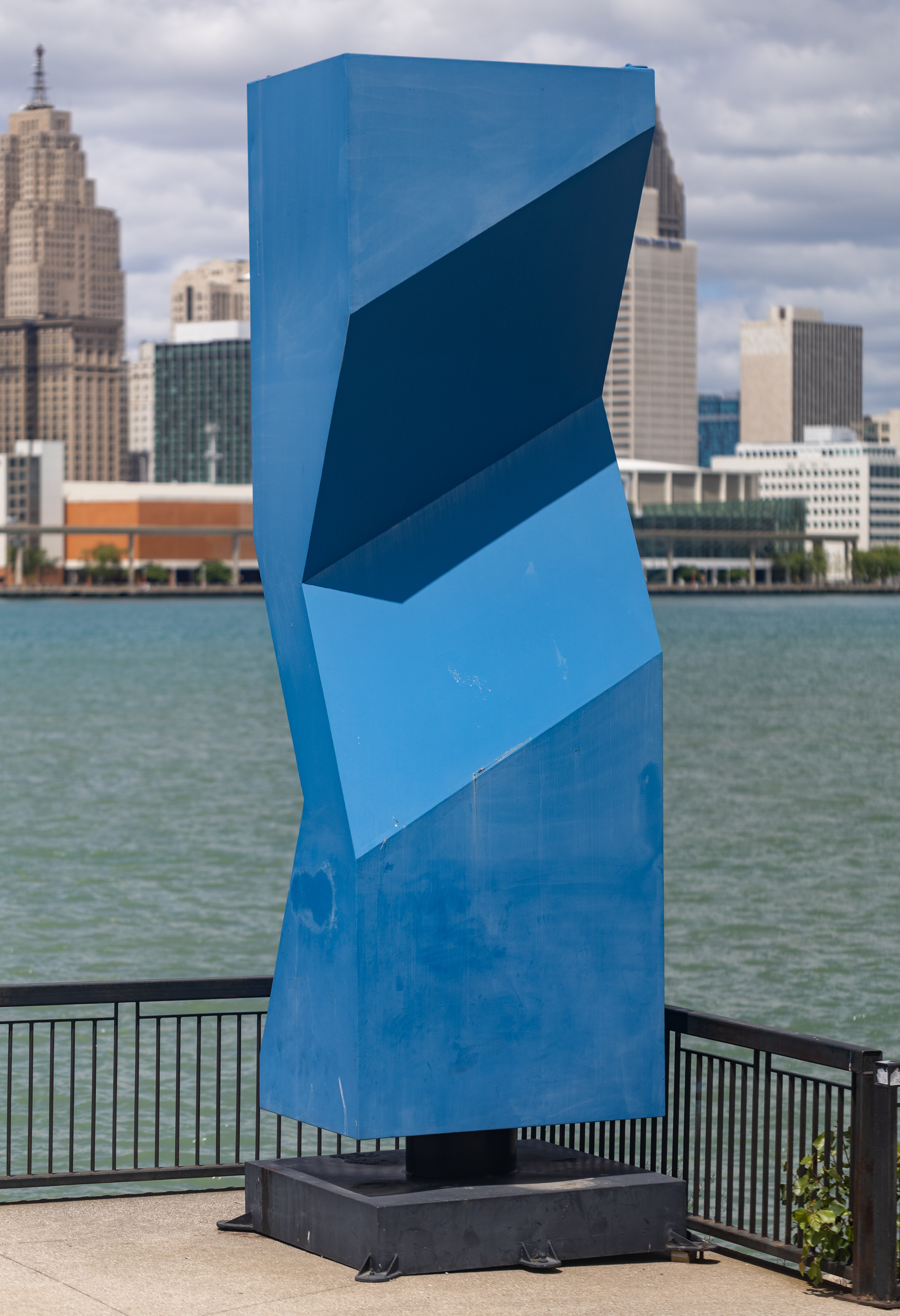
Obelisk, Sigmund Reszetnik

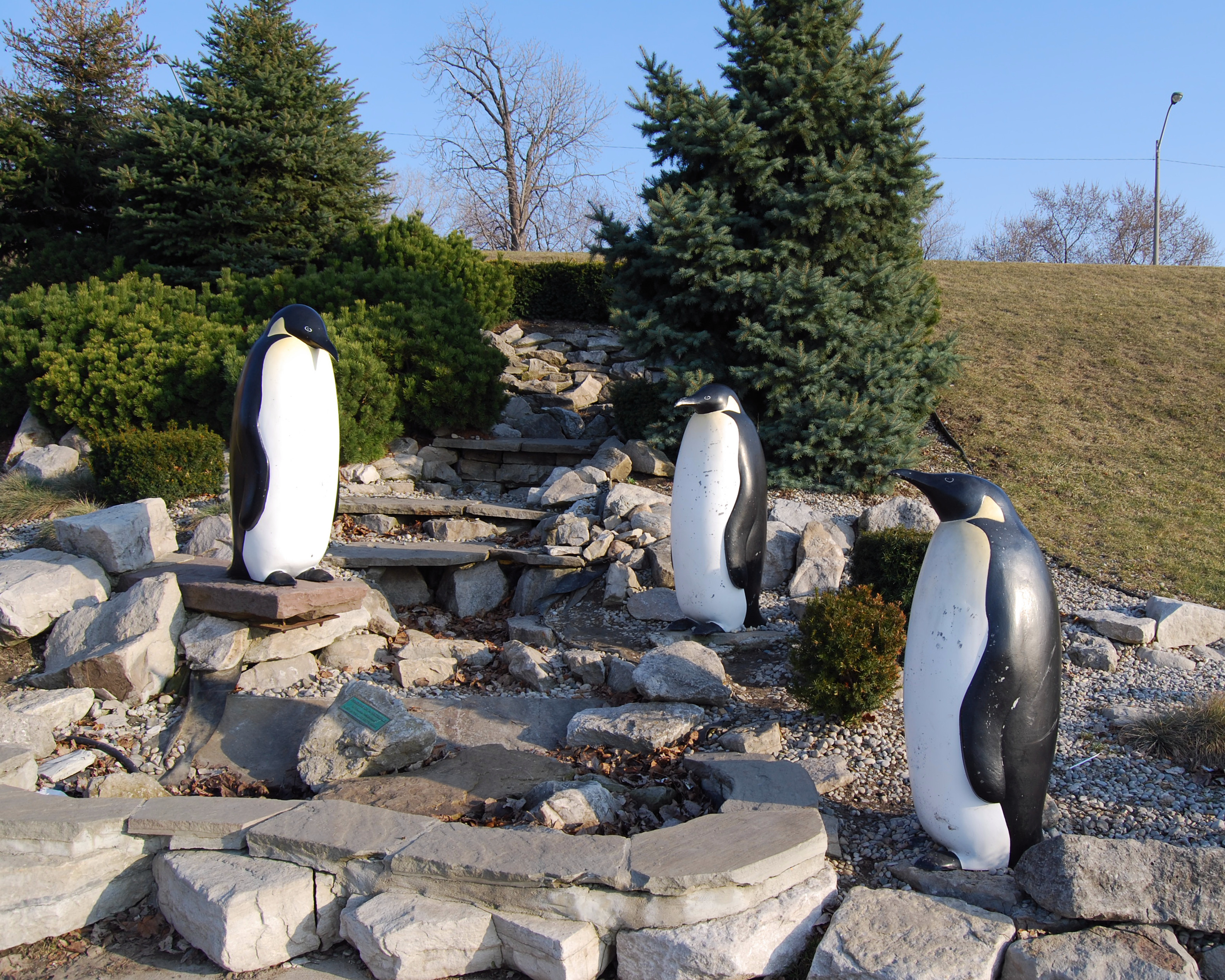
Penguins on a Waterfall, Yolanda Vandergaast

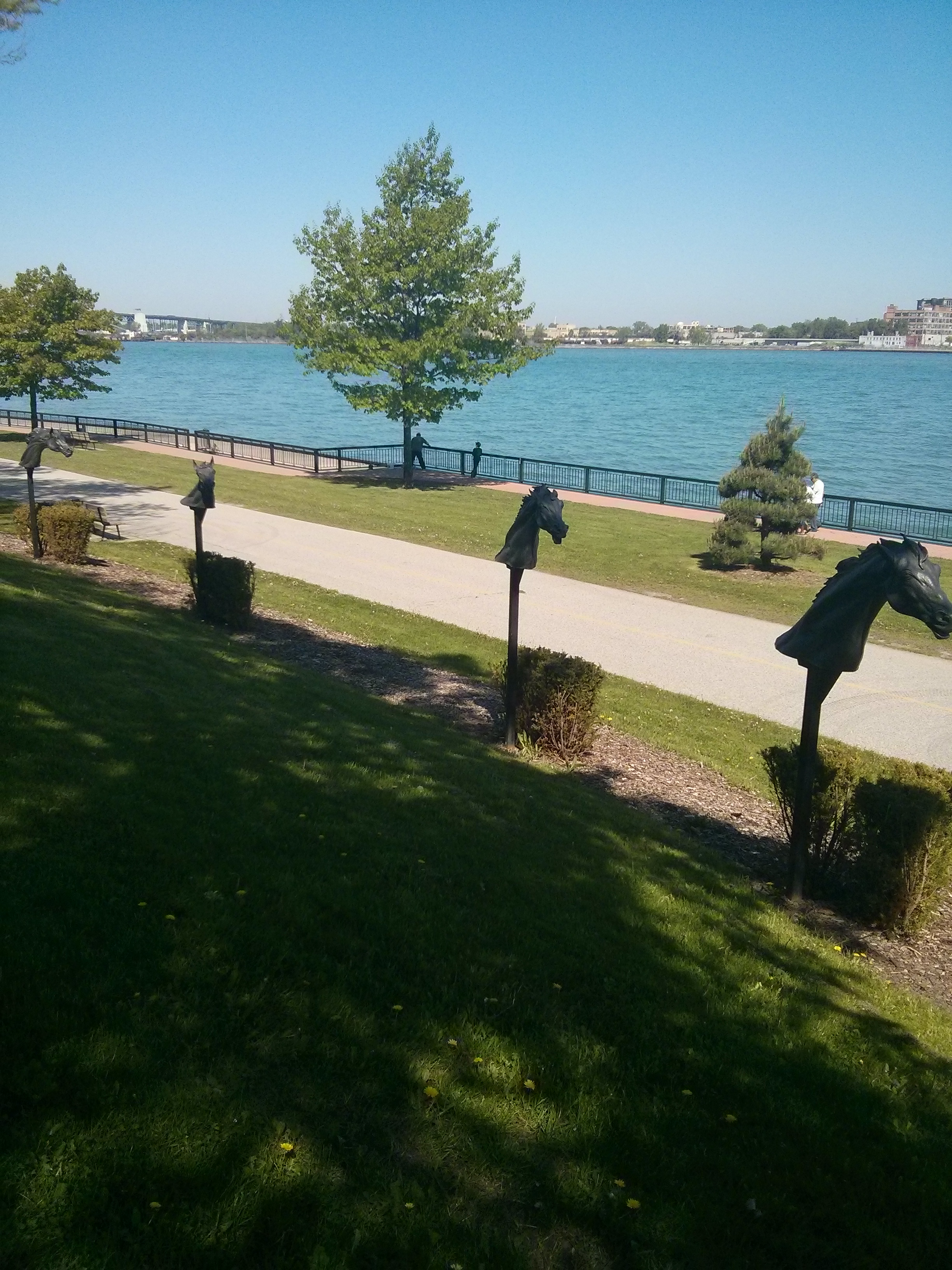
Racing Horses, Derrick Stephan Hudson

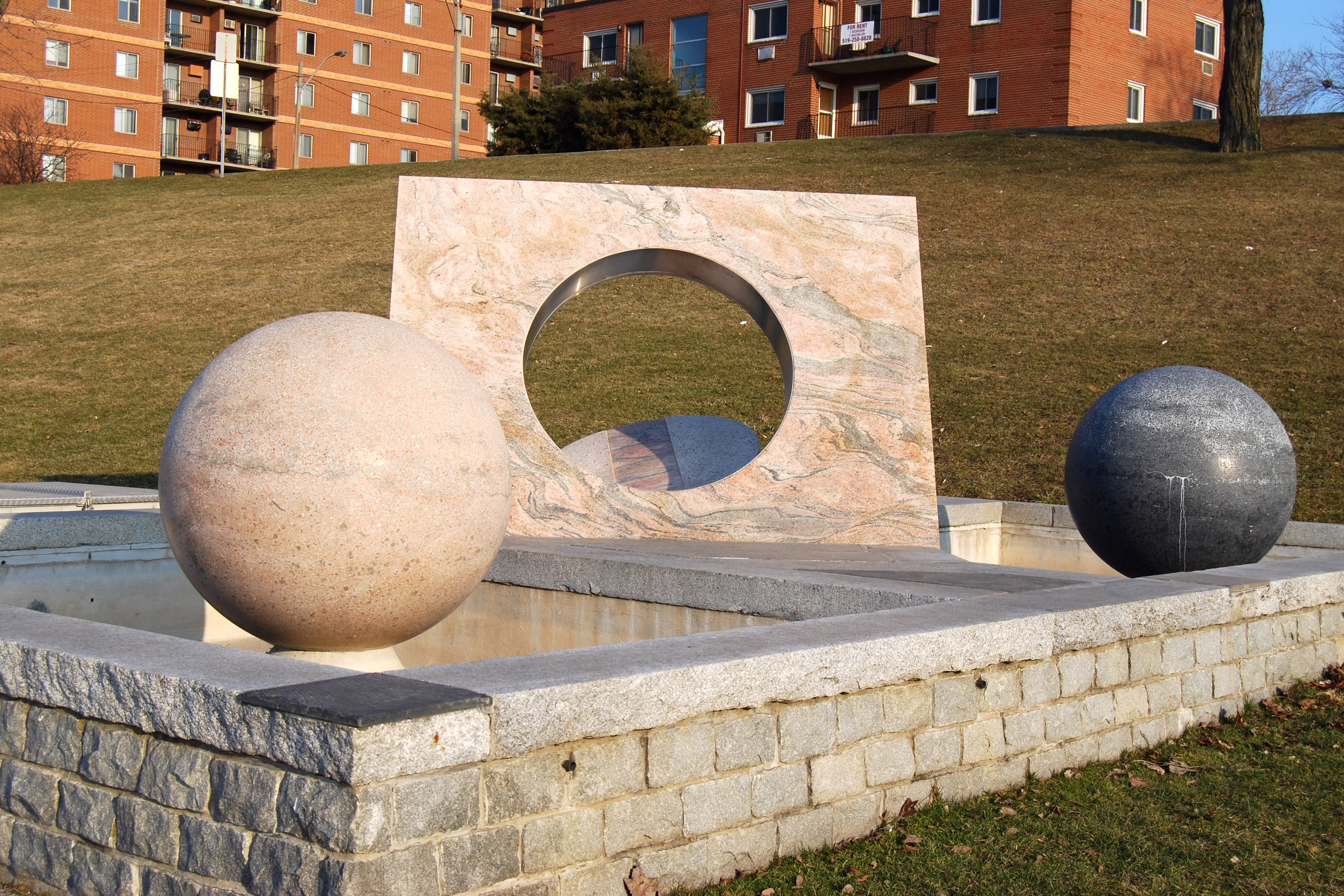
Rinterzo, Joseph DeAngelis

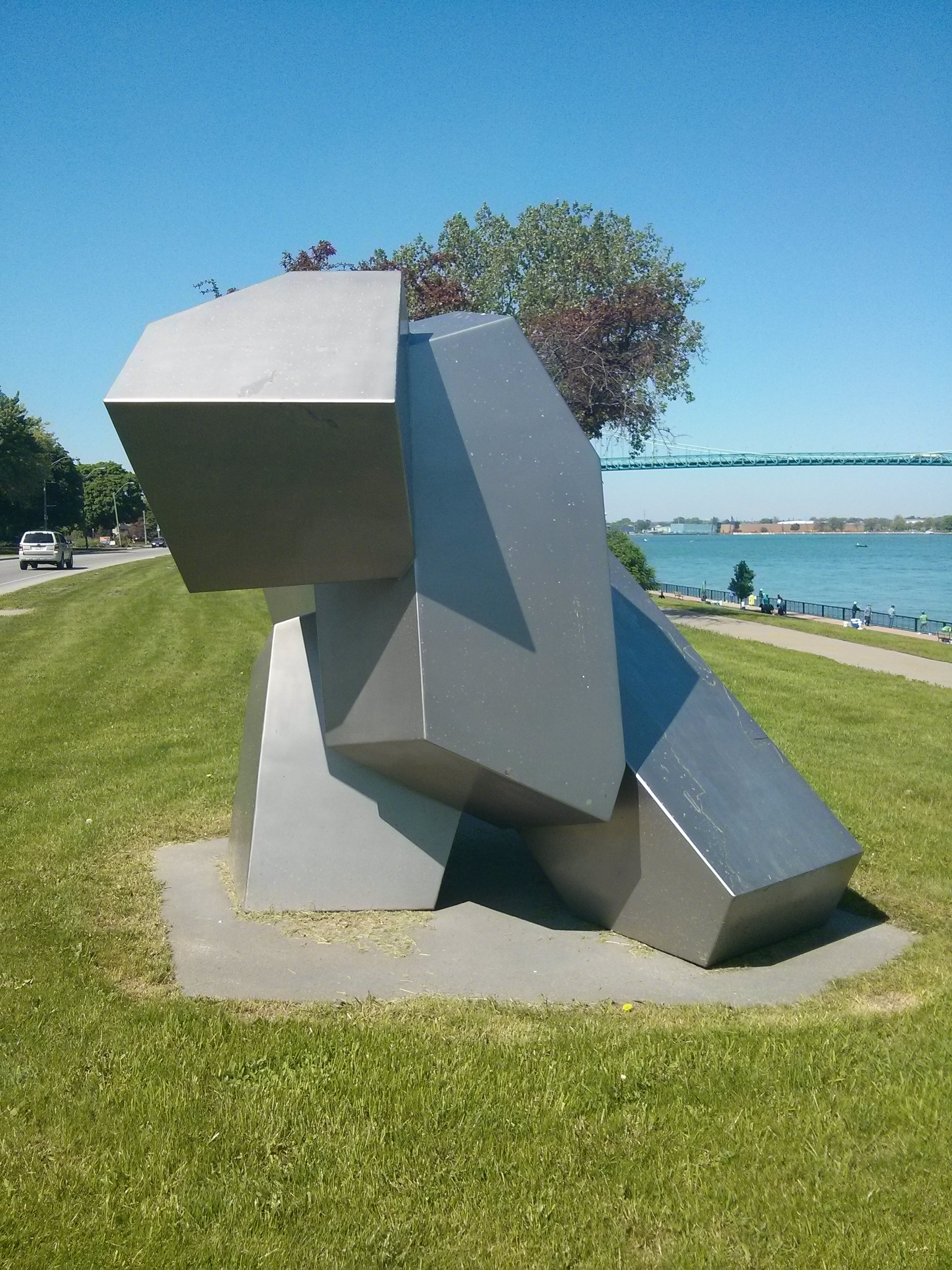
Salutation, Ralph Hicks

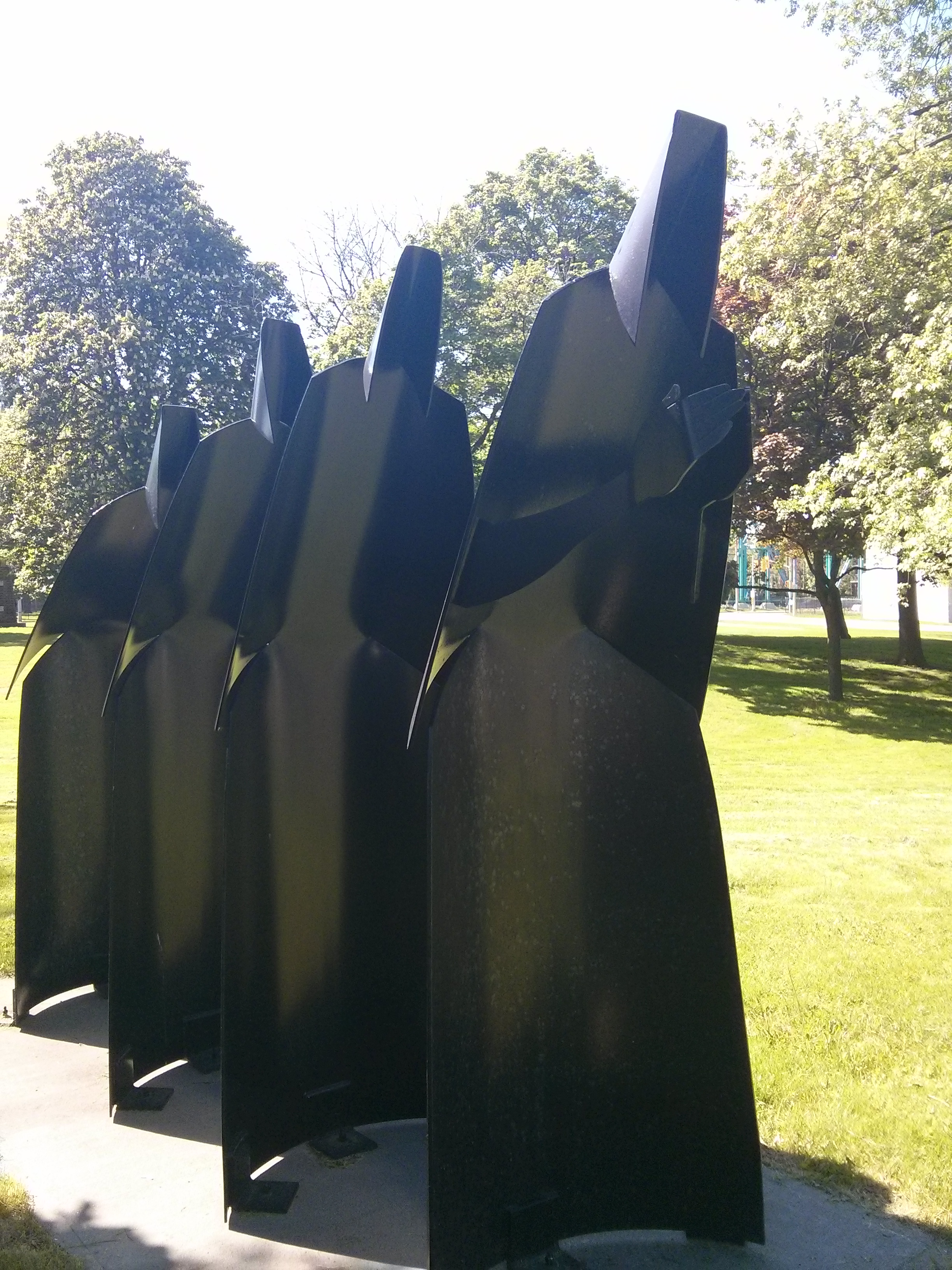
Sisters 2, Morton Katz

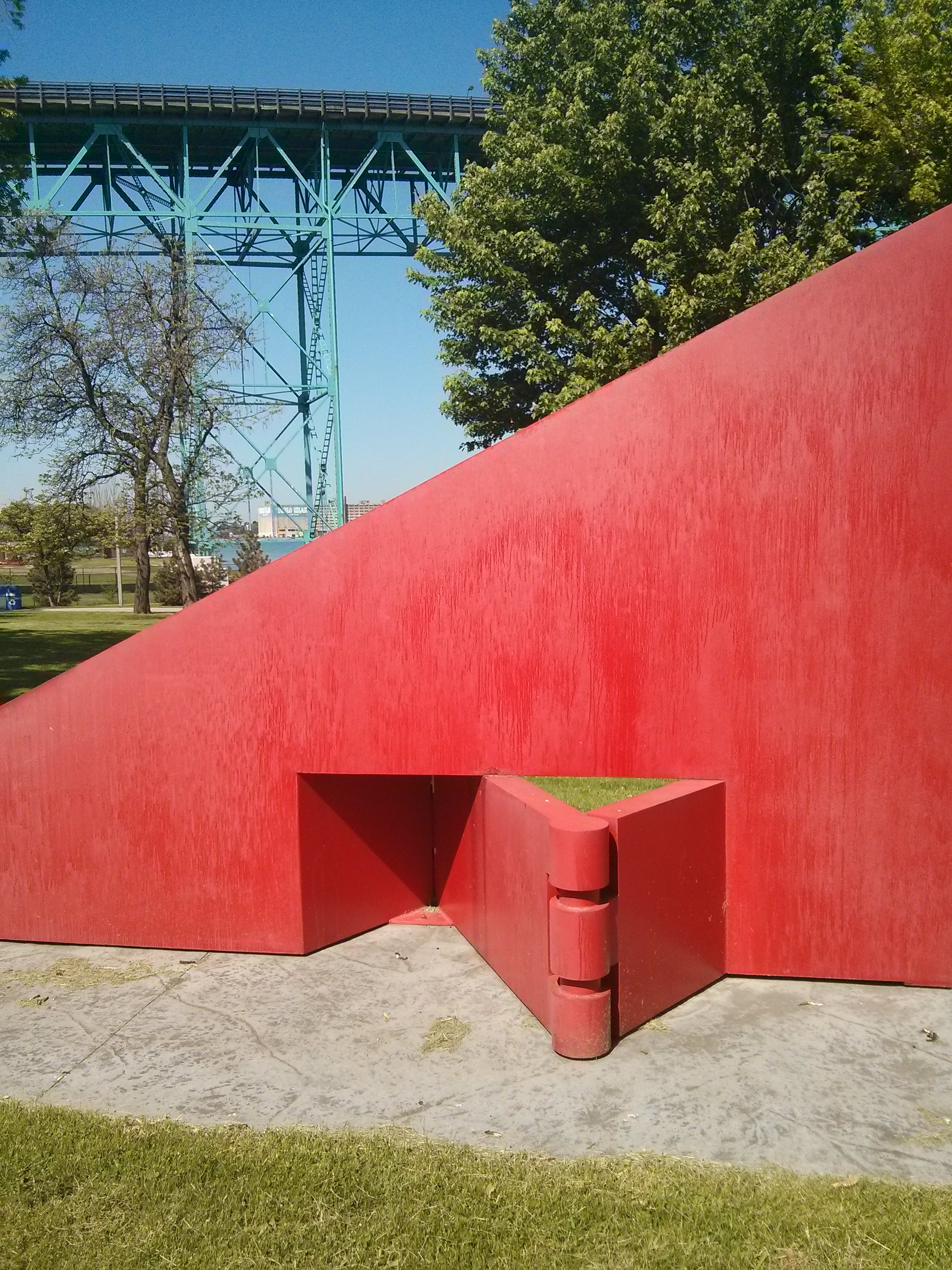
Space Plough 2, Sorel Etrog

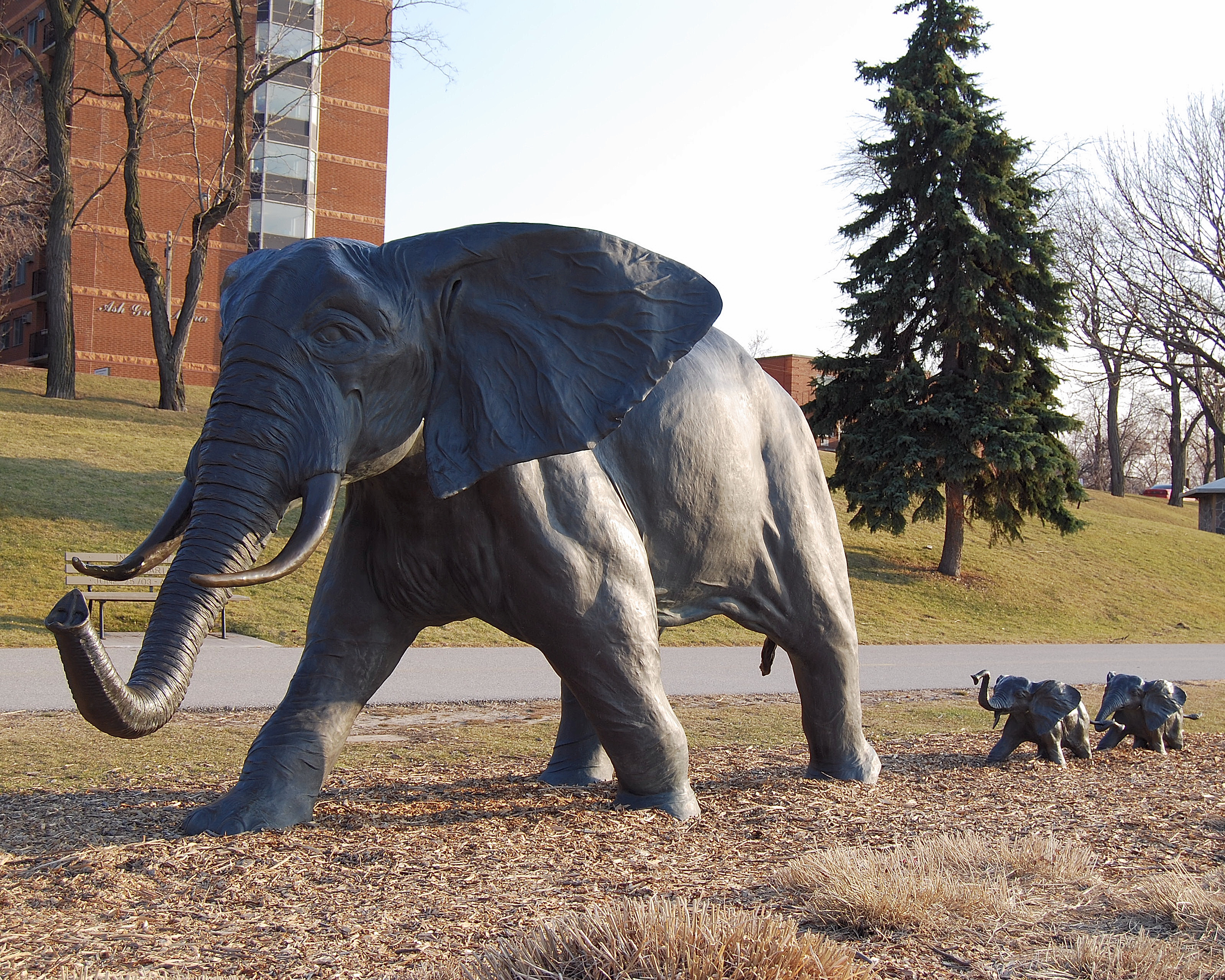
Tembo, Derrick Stephan Hudson

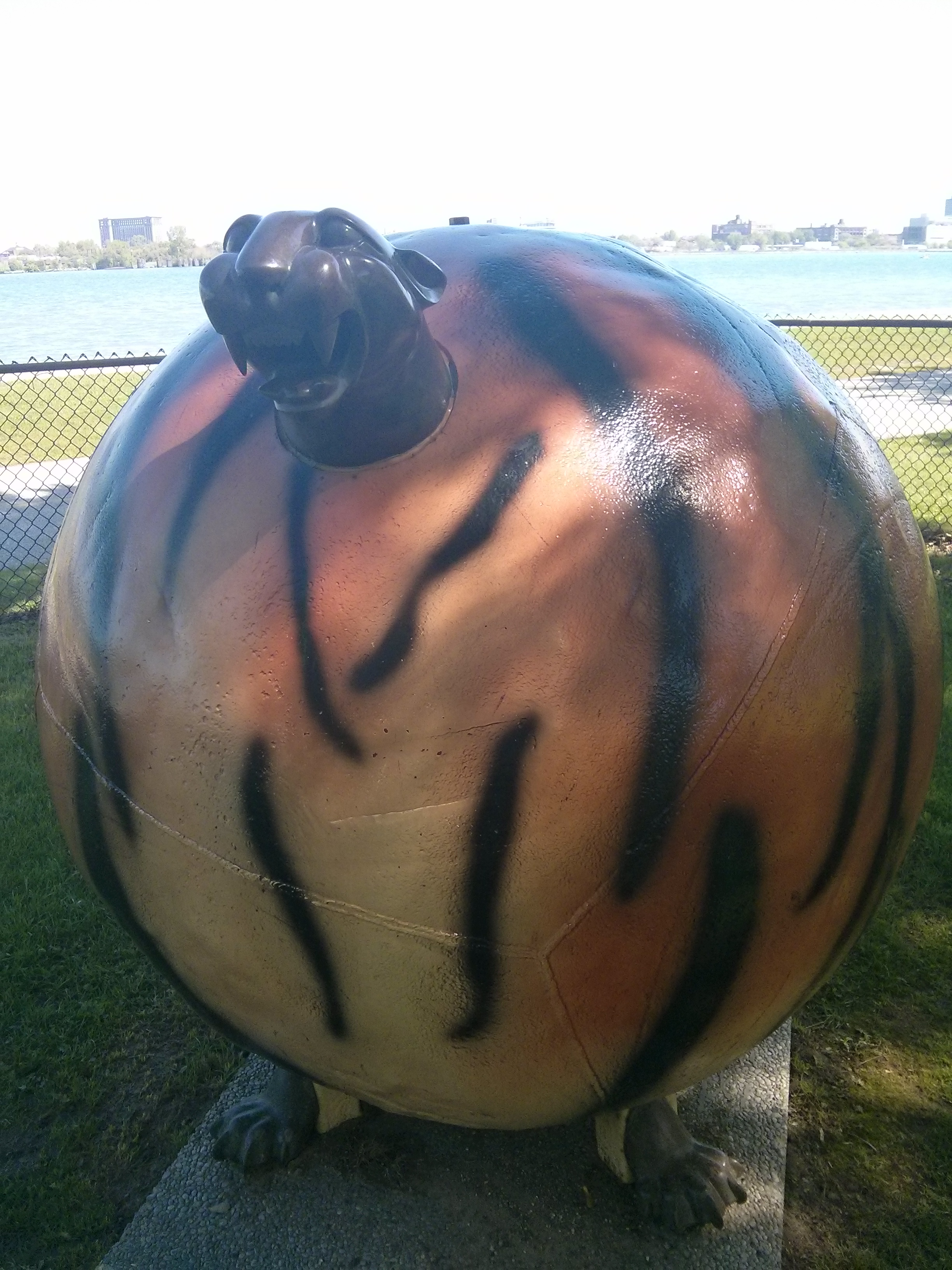
Tiger

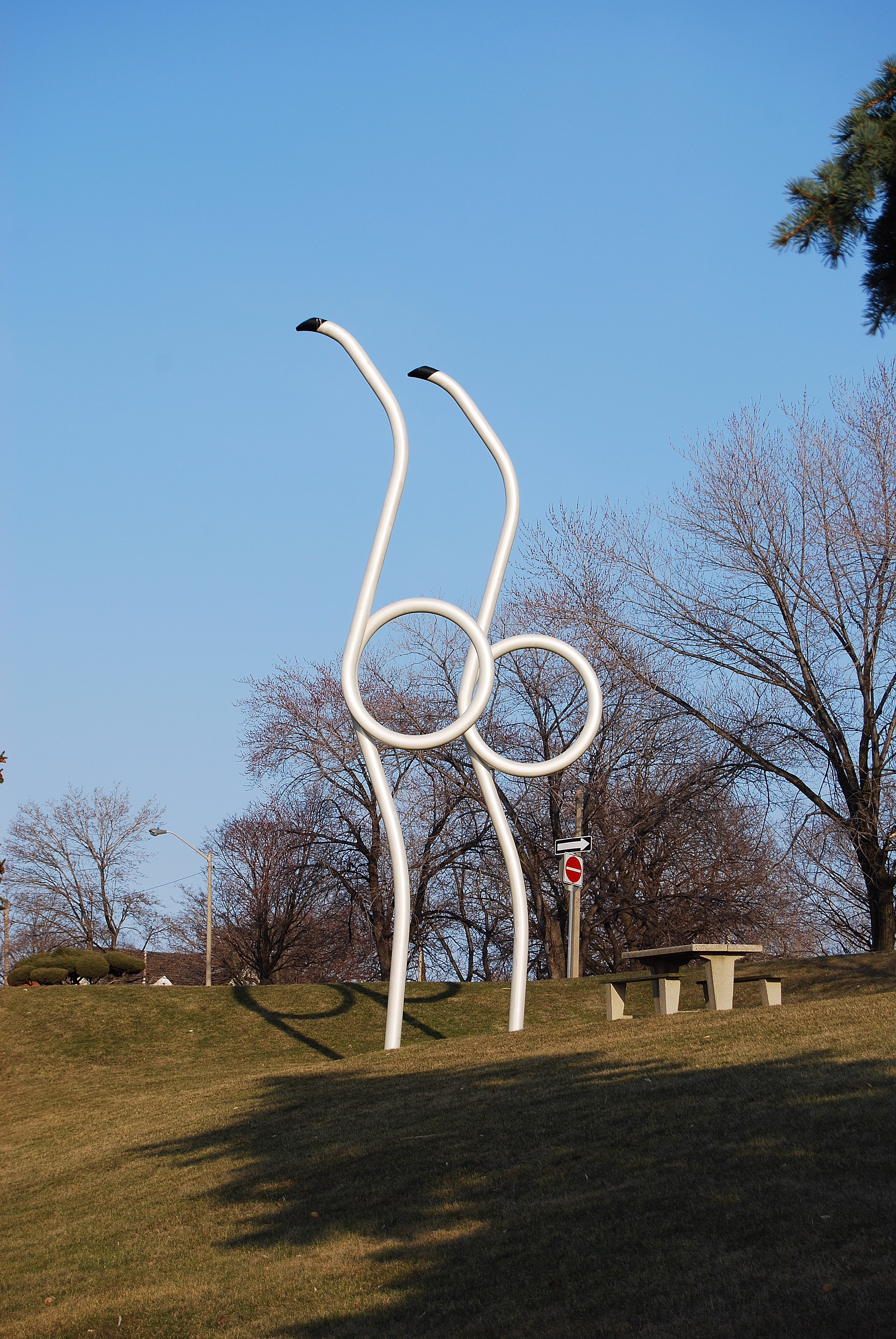
* Tohawah, Anne Harris

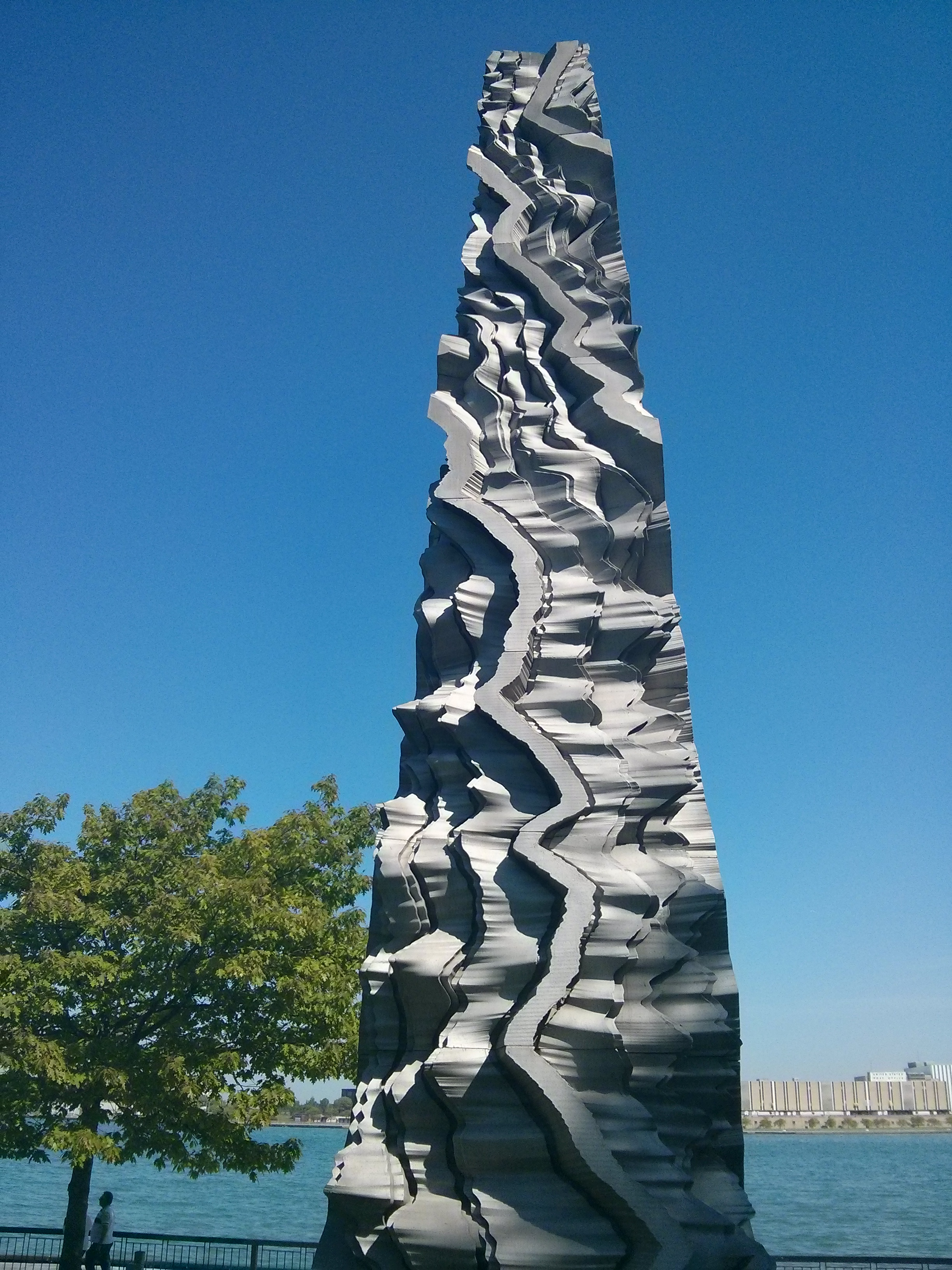
Tower Song, Ted Bieler

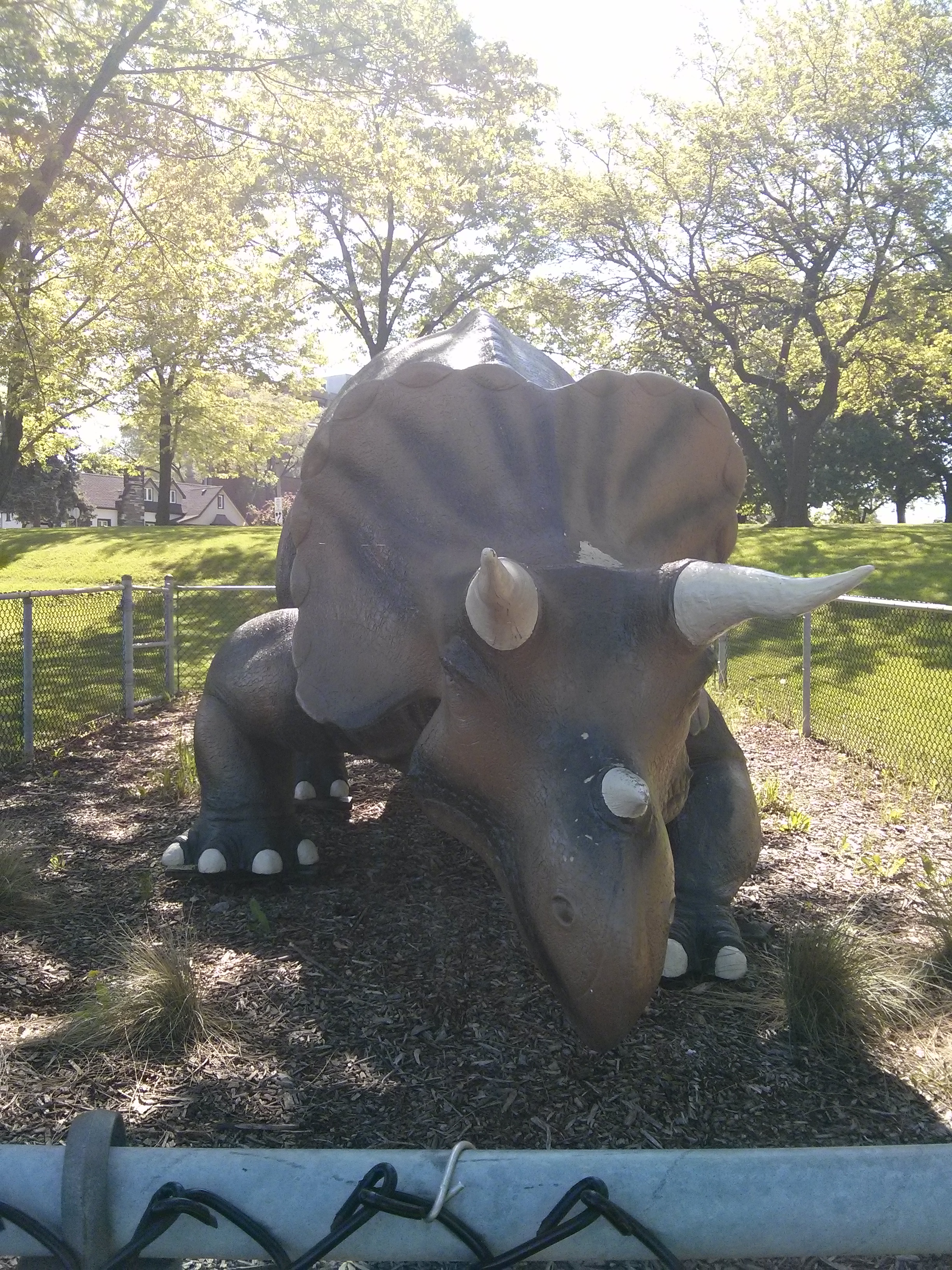
Triceratops

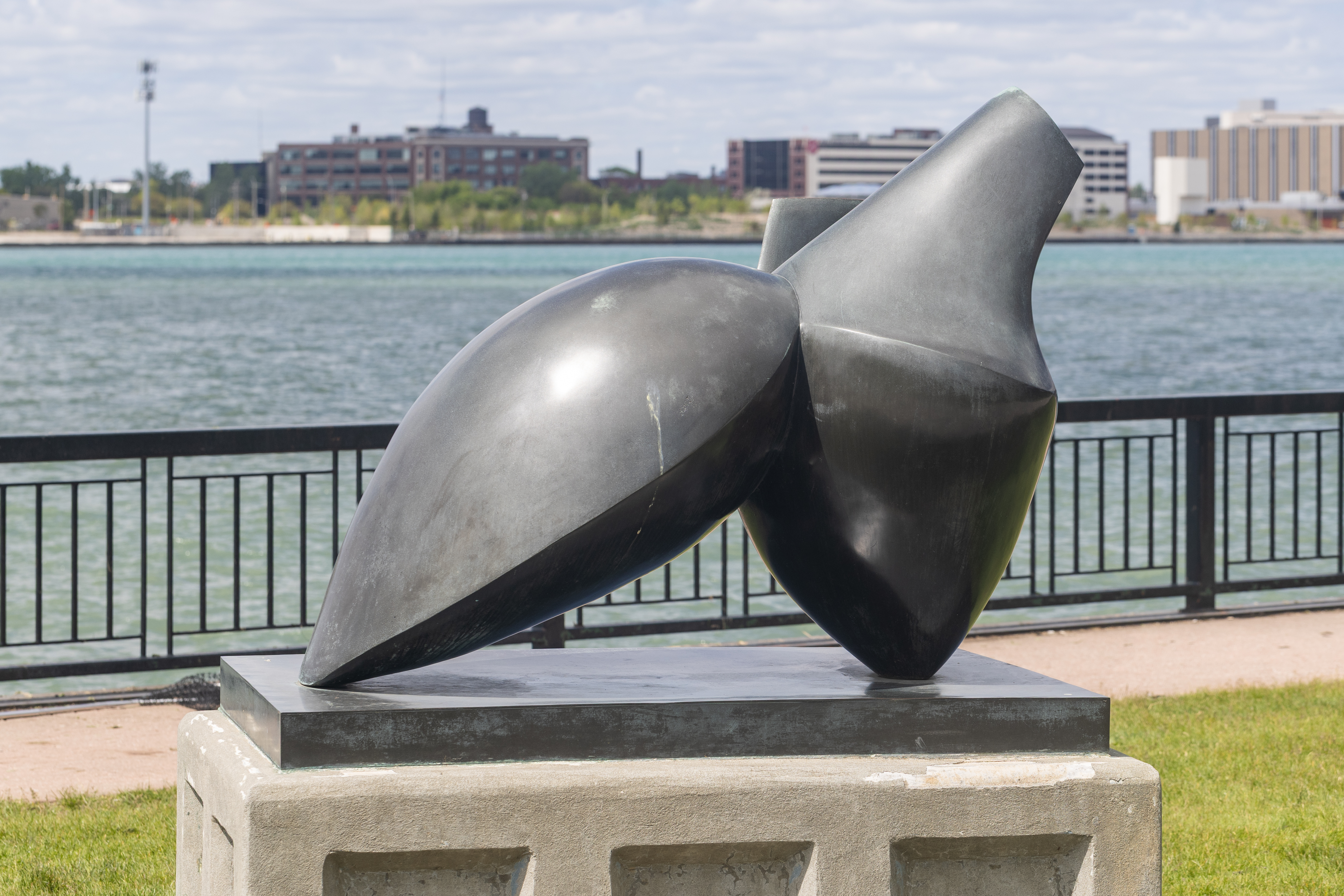
Union Six, Bruce Watson

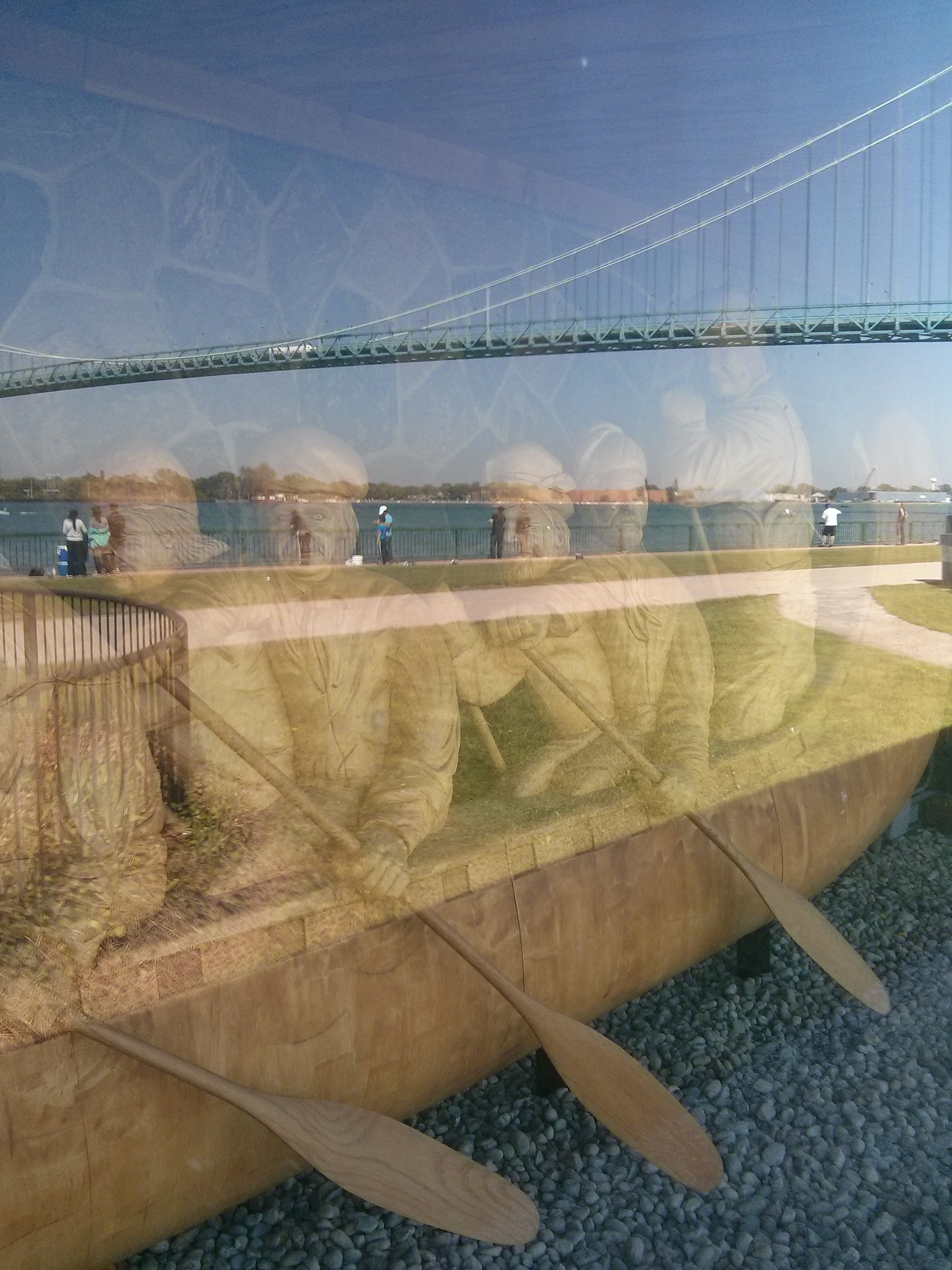
Voyageur Canoe, Ralph Ireland
- Trees, Toni Putnam
- Triptych, Gord Smith (sculptor)

== Tembo Day ==
Each year, the citizens of Windsor are invited to participate in washing Tembo. Tembo, a large bronze sculpture located in the Windsor Sculpture Park was created by Derrick Stephan Hudson. The sculpture features a mother elephant as well as two young babies.

Each year, the citizens of Windsor are invited by the City of Windsor to help wash the elephants on Tembo Day. After a bath of gentle clean of warm water and soap using toothbrushes, Sculpture Conservation Assistants spend a couple of days applying wax to protect the sculpture in preparation for the winter

The goal of Tembo Day is to create a better understanding of the importance of maintaining and preserving the care for bronze sculptures along the Windsor Sculpture Park.

Tembo Day has gained recognition throughout Windsor for its engagement with the community and has been featured in the Windsor Star and CBC Windsor.

== See also ==
- List of sculpture parks
- Riverfront Bike Trail
