= Survivors Are Not Heroes =

Bronze sculpture by Sorel Etrog in Toronto, Ontario, Canada

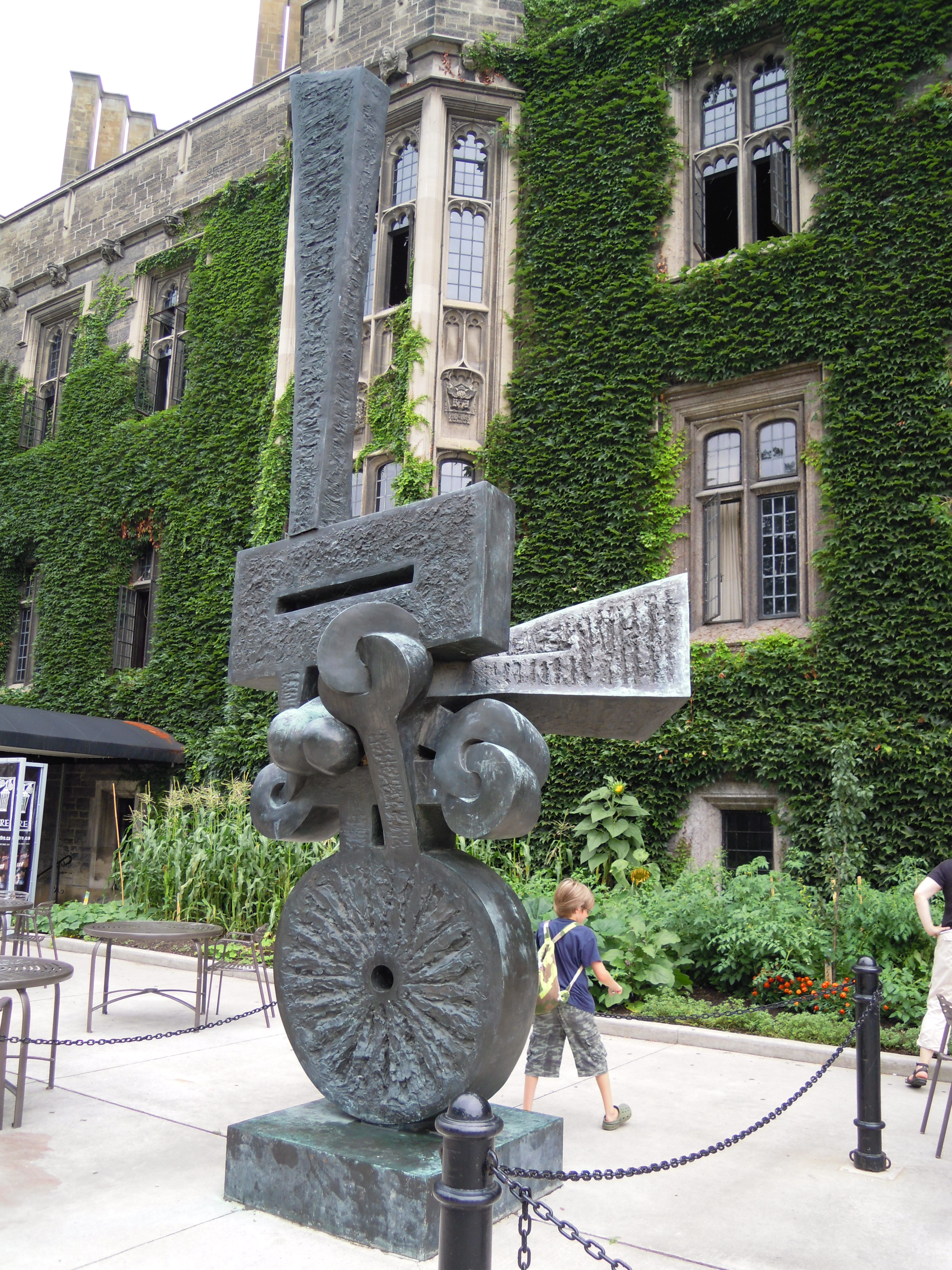
- The sculpture in 2010
- Artist: Sorel Etrog
- Year: 1967
- Medium: Bronze sculpture
- Location: Toronto, Ontario, Canada
- 43°39′48.9″N 79°23′40.2″W

Survivors Are Not Heroes is a 1967 bronze sculpture by Sorel Etrog, installed outside Hart House on the St. George campus of the University of Toronto in Toronto, Ontario, Canada.

The sculpture is a war memorial created by Etrog who was a survivor of Nazi persecution during World War II and Soviet occupation of Romania.

It was displayed in the Sculpture '67 exhibition at Nathan Phillips Square outside Toronto City Hall for the Canadian Centennial celebrations.
