= Hart House Symphonic Band =

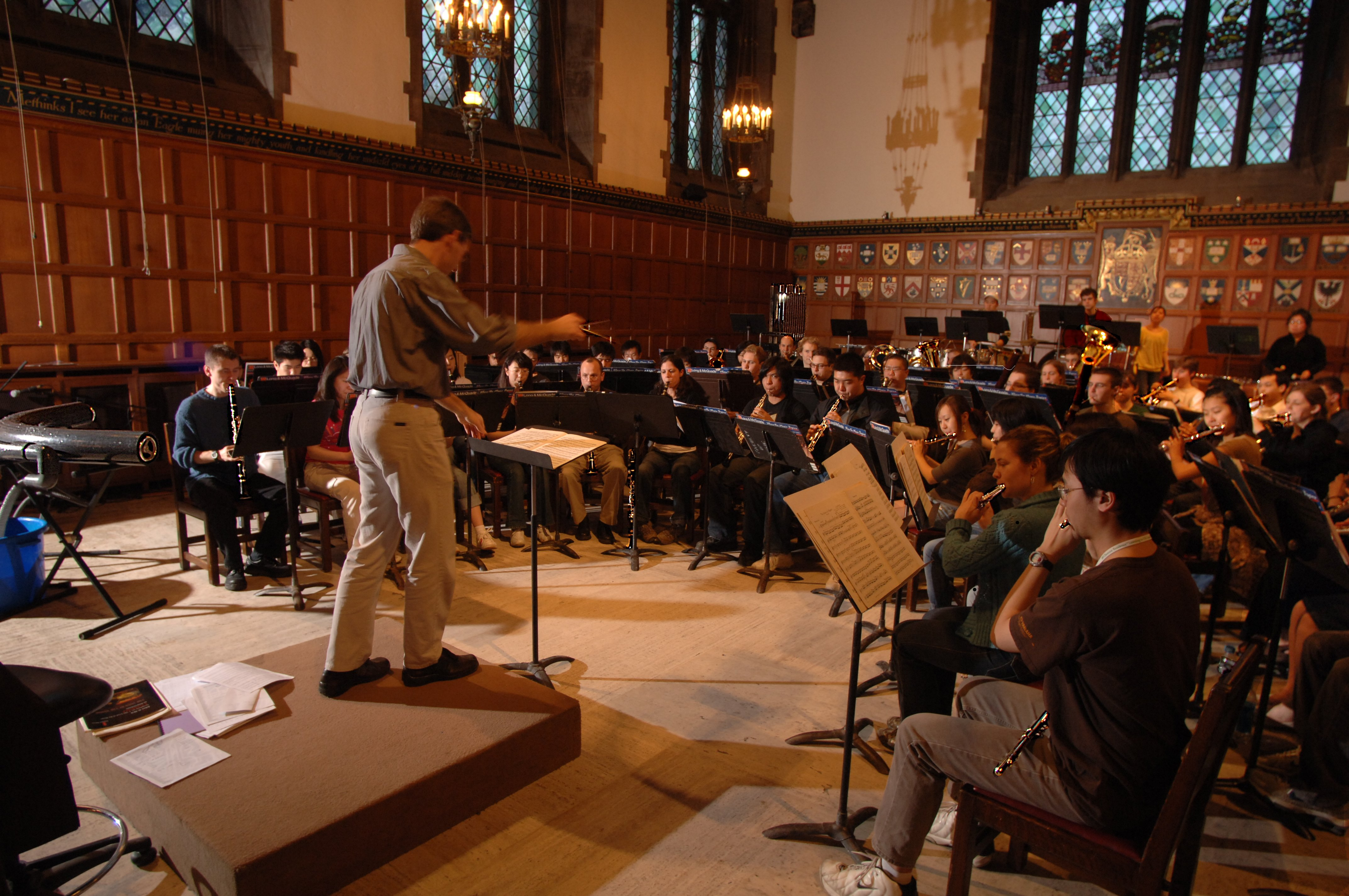
HHSB in the Great Hall, rehearsing for Spring Concert 2007 "Splashing on Story Shores"

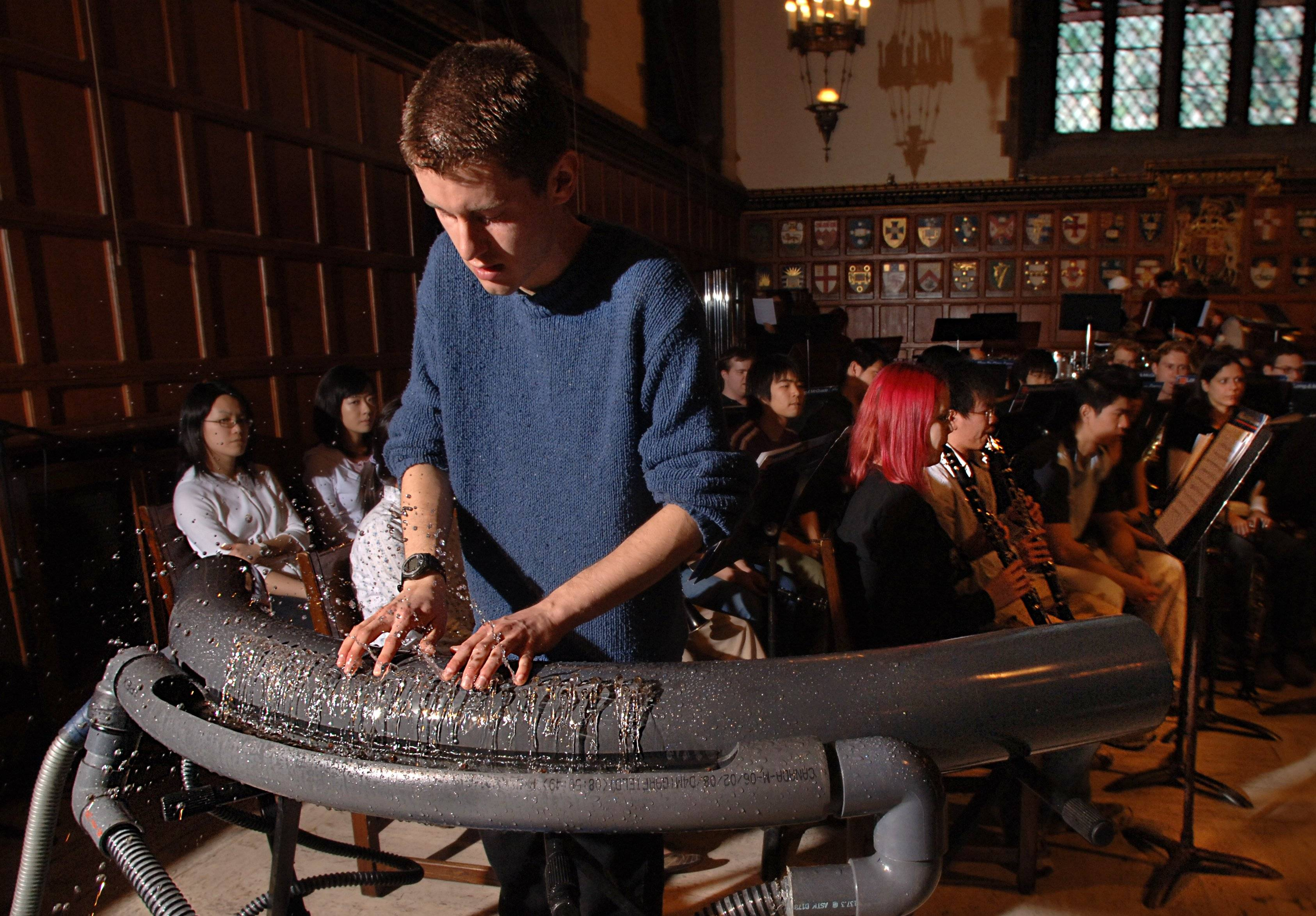
HHSB in the Great Hall, rehearsing for Spring Concert 2007 "Splashing on Story Shores"

Hart House Symphonic Band (HHSB) is a wind orchestra, with woodwind, brass, and percussion sections, based at Hart House at the University of Toronto.

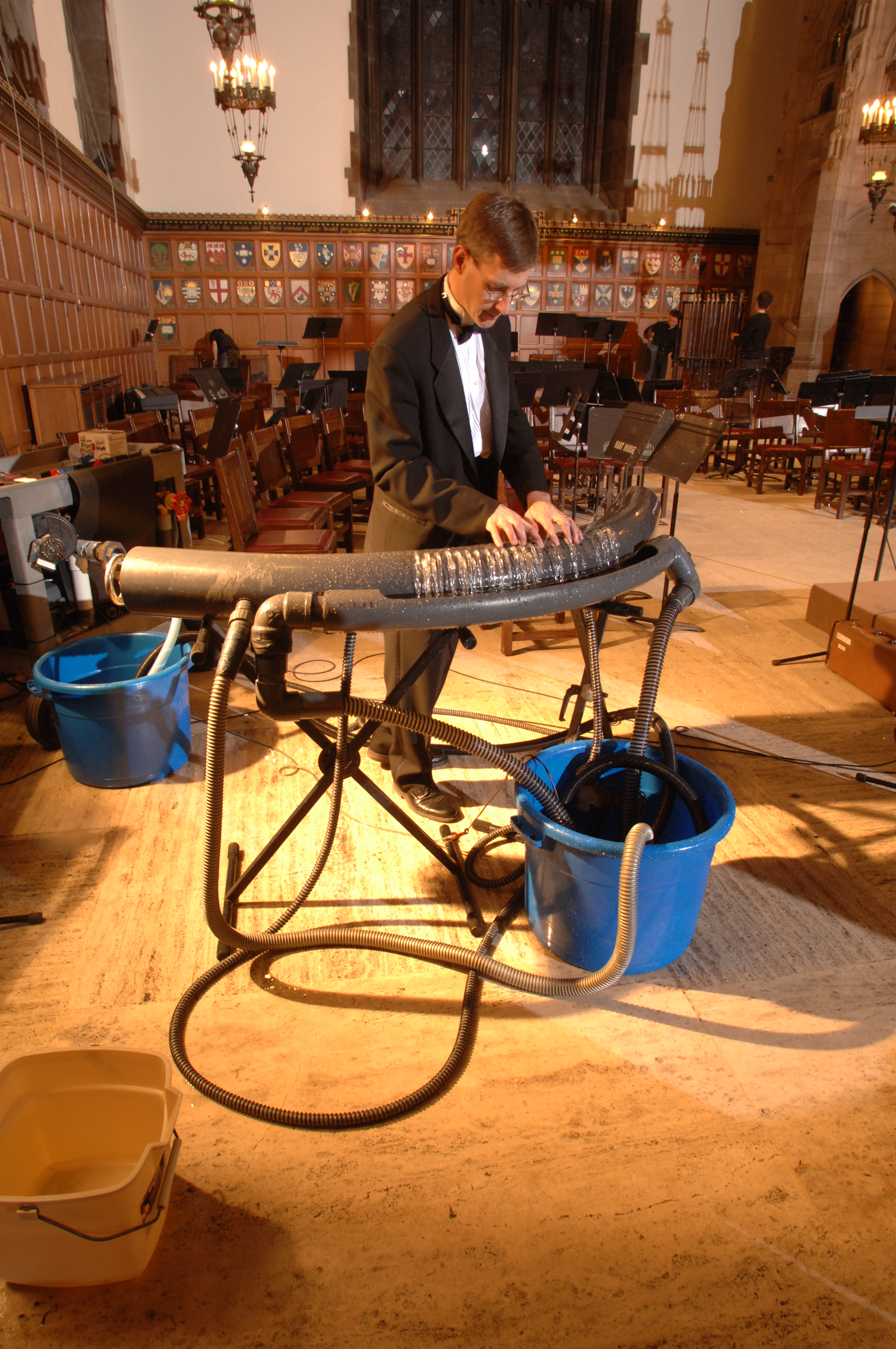
Conductor, Roger Mantie, with the hydraulophone on the evening of the world premiere of Janzen's Suite for Hydraulophone, Movement II, Rain Breaks Open What Was Forgotten

HHSB is historically noteworthy as the first symphonic band to have instruments in which the initial sound-producing mechanisms of the instruments cover all three states of matter: solid, liquid, and gas. While other orchestras have three categories of instruments (strings, percussion, and wind), two of these categories (strings and percussion) use matter in its solid state, and one category (wind instruments) uses matter in its gaseous state. HHSB is, in some sense, the first large symphonic orchestra to use hydraulophones, musical instruments that produce the initial sound by way of matter in its liquid state.

The 2007 Spring Concert, including Janzen's Suite for Hydraulophone, Movement II, was also webcast live by six "cyborgloggers" using wearable computers, underwater cameras for the hydraulophone, and camera phones.

== Conductors ==
HHSB was conducted for 11 years by Keith Reid, until 2006, and was in 2007 conducted by Roger Mantie, a PhD candidate at University of Toronto's Faculty of Music. Roger Mantie announced on March 11, 2008, that he would not be returning as the band's conductor in the fall. Since 2008, the band has been conducted by Mark Saresky.

== Concerts ==
HHSB has two main concerts (at Hart House) each year: one in the spring and one in the fall. Additionally, HHSB has toured on some years, to hold other concerts. The concerts are generally free to the public.

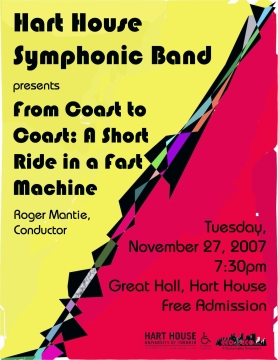
Poster for the Fall 2007 concert, From Coast to Coast: A Short Ride in a Fast Machine
