= Hart House (University of Toronto) =

Student activity centre of the University of Toronto

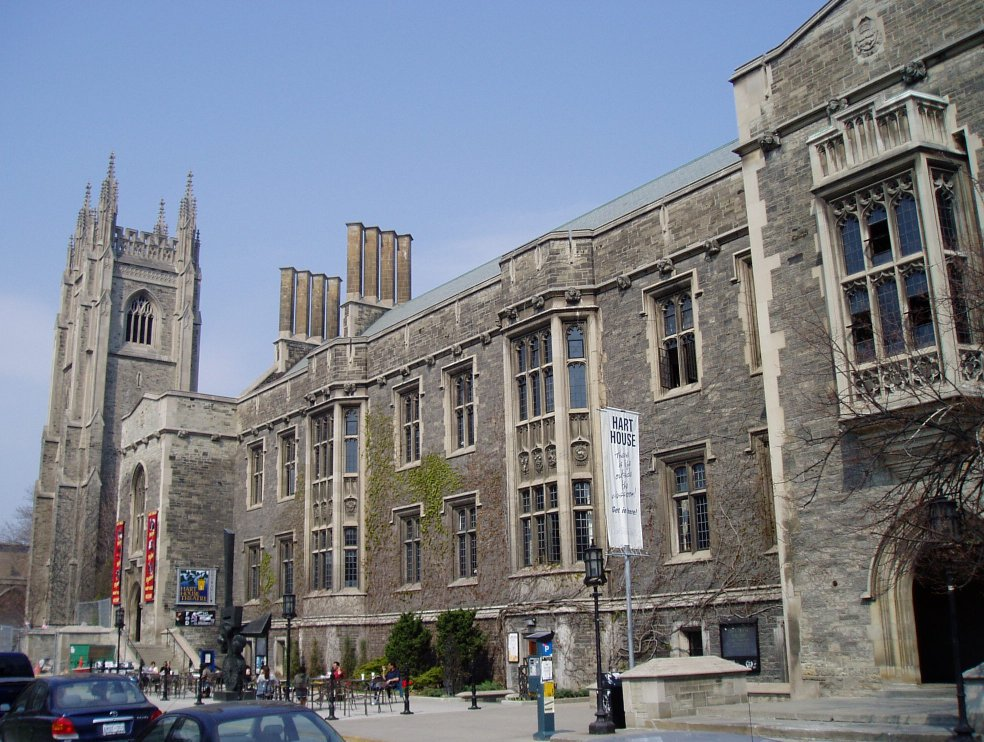
- The Hart House building in 2005
- Established: 1911 (115 years ago)
- Location: 7 Hart House Circle; Toronto, Ontario, Canada
- Coordinates: 43°39′50″N 79°23′40″W
- Warden: David Kim
- Owner: University of Toronto
- Public transit access: at Museum
- Website: harthouse.ca

Ontario Heritage Act
- Criteria: Designated Part IV
- Designated: Jun 20, 1973

Hart House is the main student activity centre of the University of Toronto. Located on the St. George campus in Toronto, Ontario, Canada, it is the cultural centre of the university's tri-campus community. Established in 1919, it is one of the earliest North American student centres, being the location of student debates and conferences since its construction. Hart House was initiated and financed by Vincent Massey, an alumnus and benefactor of the university, and was named in honour of his grandfather, Hart Massey. The Collegiate Gothic-revival complex was the work of architect Henry Sproatt, who worked alongside decorator Alexander Scott Carter, and engineer Ernest Rolph, and subsequently designed the campanile at its southwestern corner, the Soldiers' Tower. In 1957, the house hosted future U.S. President John F. Kennedy.

== History ==
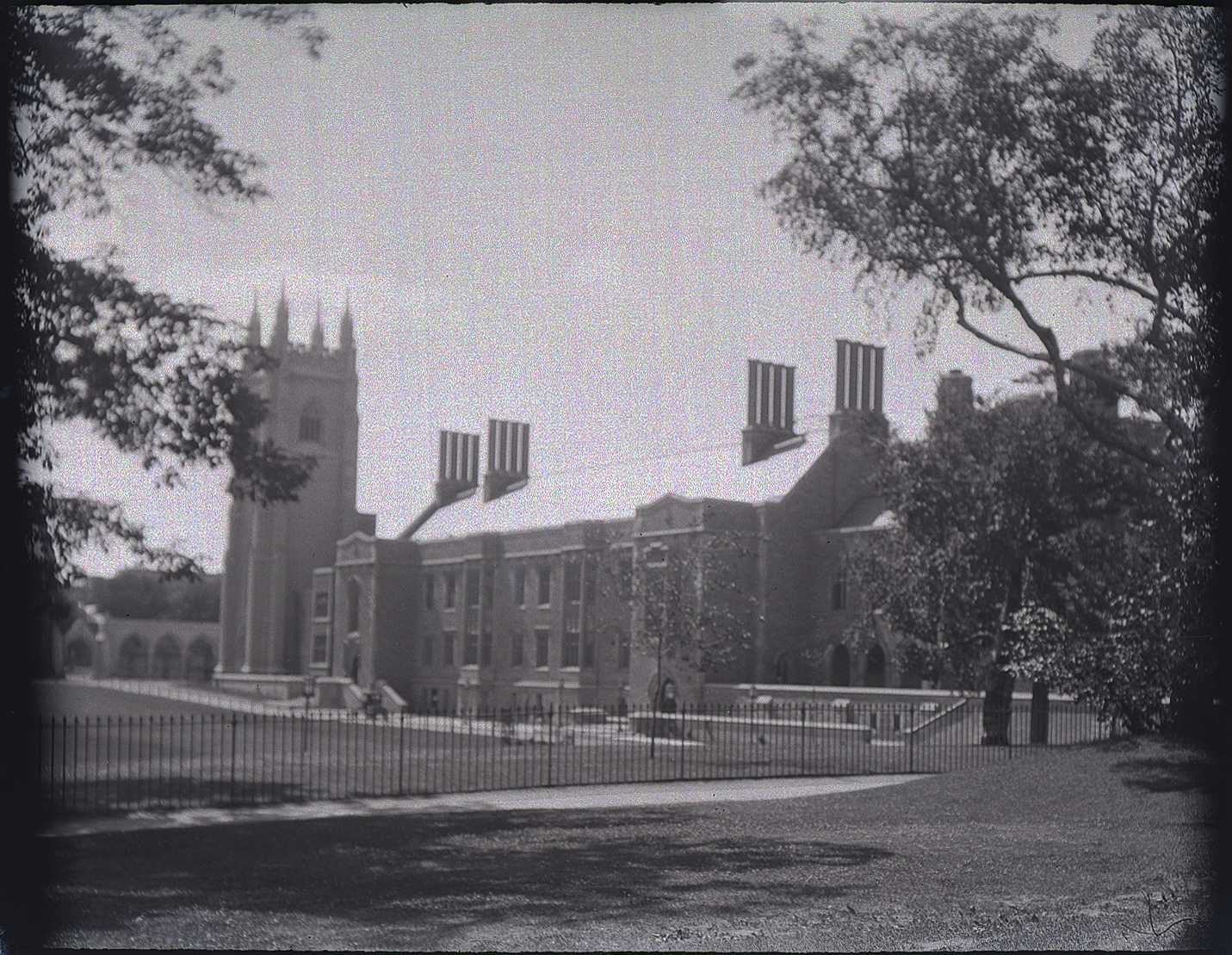
Hart House, University of Toronto, taken in July 1924, from the M.O. Hammond fonds held at the Archives of Ontario.

As an undergraduate, Vincent Massey read history and English at University College in the University of Toronto, and then completed graduate studies in history at Balliol College, Oxford. Upon his return to Canada, he sought to bring a unifying, communitarian spirit to the highly independent colleges of the University of Toronto, inspired by the social and recreational life that he observed at Oxford's colleges. Massey, who in 1908 had become a trustee of his family estate, offered to establish a structure devoted to extracurricular activities at the university, an idea that was embraced by the university's governors. The land on which the building exists was close to the McCaul's pond, which was buried along with Taddle Creek in 1886.

When construction began in 1911, the trustees of the Massey estate had budgeted $300,000 for the project. Working without a master plan, Massey and his architect continued to adopt new ideas and expand existing ones as construction progressed. By the time of its completion in 1919, the cost of the building had soared to $2 million.

Hart House was built during the Gothic Revival era. Originally, Gothic architecture was associated with cathedrals. The Gothic cathedral was built at a large scale. When the style had first gained its momentum in England and France, the large churches were encrusted with decoration. This decoration depicted biblical events through images so that even the illiterate could dwell in the ideals of religion. Originally, the church developed universities. Hart House is intended to evoke that history. The building is made up of corridors flanked by rooms with high ceilings and sculptural detailing.

Massey's donation stipulated that the building was to be used only by men, as he felt that a coeducational facility would ruin the sense of collegiality that he hoped to create. Beginning in the 1950s, this restriction created much controversy, as women demanded admission. Until the end of his life Massey stood by his original conditions, although some progress did occur. In 1954 the Arbor room coffee shop was constructed, which was the first co-educational space in Hart House. Additionally, in 1958 the first debate was held which women were allowed to attend, although they were segregated behind a rope and not allowed to speak. After Vincent Massey's death in 1967 the Stewards and administrators of Hart House had Massey's deed of gift altered to allow women to become members. Since 1972, women have been able to fully participate in the House's activities.

During John F. Kennedy's debate with Stephen Lewis at Hart House on 14 November 1957, Kennedy said "I personally rather approve of keeping women out of these places." He also said, "It's a pleasure to be in a country where women cannot mix in everywhere" (ignoring the female students who picketed outside with signs proclaiming "Unfair!" and "We want Kennedy!").

The southern facade of Hart House. The Soldiers' Tower on the southwestern corner of Hart House is visible at left.

== First Commonwealth Conference ==
The first unofficial Commonwealth conference was held at Hart House from the 11–21 September 1933 (The Commonwealth Relations Conference) organised by the Canadian Institute of International Affairs and the UK Royal Institute of International Affairs (Chatham House) at the invitation of one of the delegates Vincent Massey. Chaired by former Canadian Prime Minister Sir Robert Borden with Arnold Toynbee as Recorder. All the then Commonwealth nations were present with 77 international delegates. There were seven Commonwealth countries at the time: Canada, Britain, Australia, New Zealand, Newfoundland (later to become a province of Canada), South Africa and the Irish Free State. There is a photograph of the delegates in the Debating Chamber of the building. These conferences then occurred irregularly around the Commonwealth in succeeding years until the official Commonwealth Heads of Government Meetings began.

== Architecture ==
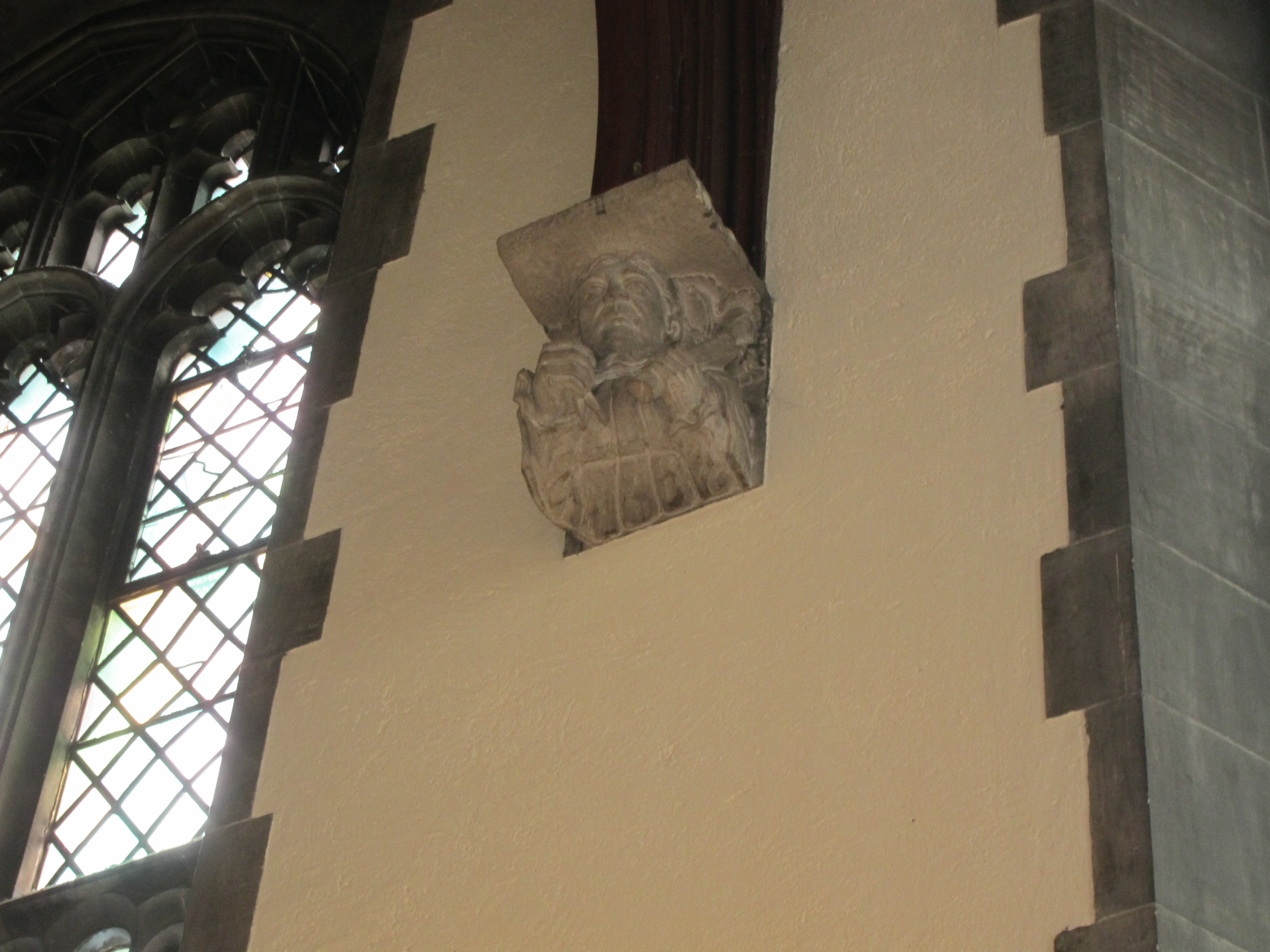
Officer carved into stone corbel

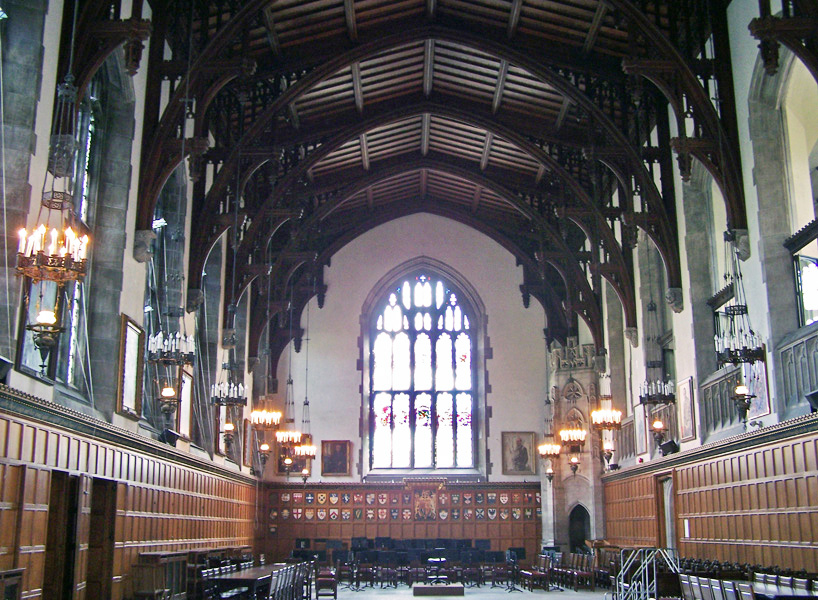
The Great Hall

Hart House is large in comparison to the buildings surrounding it such as Wycliffe College and the Stewart Observatory. In keeping with the Gothic form, the building is presented as larger in height than in width, which gives an even greater sense of grandeur to those standing at its base. From the exterior, a repetition of large windows can be seen along the northern and southern sides, matched with stout exterior protrusions accentuating the end of one section of the building and the beginning of another. The contours of the building are jagged, emphasizing the Gothic form and giving Hart House the profile of an academic institution of that time period.

A variety of intimate details can also be found in the interior. Below grade, backstage, at the rear wall of the theatre, there are scars formed by service ammunition, giving the building a sense of character. There are also elements forged into the walls of the building, like the first occupants of the house, who are remembered on the south façade, as well as carvings over the bay windows of the map room which depict the principal units that were stationed there during the war. The Great Hall holds another souvenir, inconsistent with the Gothic setting: one of the stone corbels has been carved to represent an officer cadet of 1916 in uniform, carrying his field pack and rifle.

Hart House is an example of Gothic Revival architecture as it is asymmetrical with pointed arches and windows, extensive ornamentation, steeply pitched roofs and a tall tower. It is also a late collegiate Gothic building because of its late erection date, 1919. The building consists of four wings around a quadrangle with a four-peaked tower extended from the south west corner. Although Hart House appears to be of masonry construction, it is actually structural steel and precast concrete with grey sandstone cladding. The roofs are barrel vaulted wood beams. Wood and stone are the main materials used in this building.

=== Composition ===
The majority of elements within Hart House hint at the Perpendicular style of Gothic architecture and thus generally line up in a row. Arches and vaults are the dominant structural form, however, there are parts of the building that employ lintels to create open spaces with flat ceilings (such as the East Common Room). The ceilings in the corridors and many rooms such as the Upper Gallery of the Great Hall are vaults with ridge ribs, but of particular emphasis is the treatment of the library ceiling that uses decorative Lierne ribs, which can also be seen in the entrance vaults. The general shape of the frontispieces and what appear to be Tudor-like archways mirror the shape of the chimney arches, while the decorative cinquefoil shapes used for the windows can also be seen in the woodwork of doors and trusses. The main entrance on the south side, the entrance on the west side, and the entire east wall is treated with a Perpendicular style parapet of battlements. The Gothic nature of the structure is emphasized through the structural systems, layout, and ornamentation, while the weight of stone is de-emphasized through its decoration, and its contrast with the thin stained-glass windows.

View of Hart House's inner courtyard

Close to the Romanesque-building style, Gothic, or Gothic-revival style uses stone masonry to build. The use of rocky dark sandstone and limestone materials contrasted greatly with the smooth brick lining inside, the pointed-arch shape dominating the windows and doors and hallways. The porch is another Gothic-revival element that architect Henry Sproatt added, a protected space in front of the main entrances for people to hide in case of bad weather. The addition of decorated wooden arch-braces and ceilings act like an acoustical amplifier for the Hart House Orchestra.

Even though the detail of the Gothic style is much simpler than the Romanesque style, it still has decorative stone and wood carvings inside and outside the building. On the south side of the building there is a line of miniature human head sculptures made out of stone near the top of the building. There are also stone lions and monkeys that are on the outside of the main doors one at each side. The arch braces on the flat roofs of the east hall ways have carved decorations on them. The windows have clover like decorations near the top. Even the school crest and motto is carved onto the façade of Hart House. These carvings are a beautiful addition aesthetically to the building.

== Governance ==
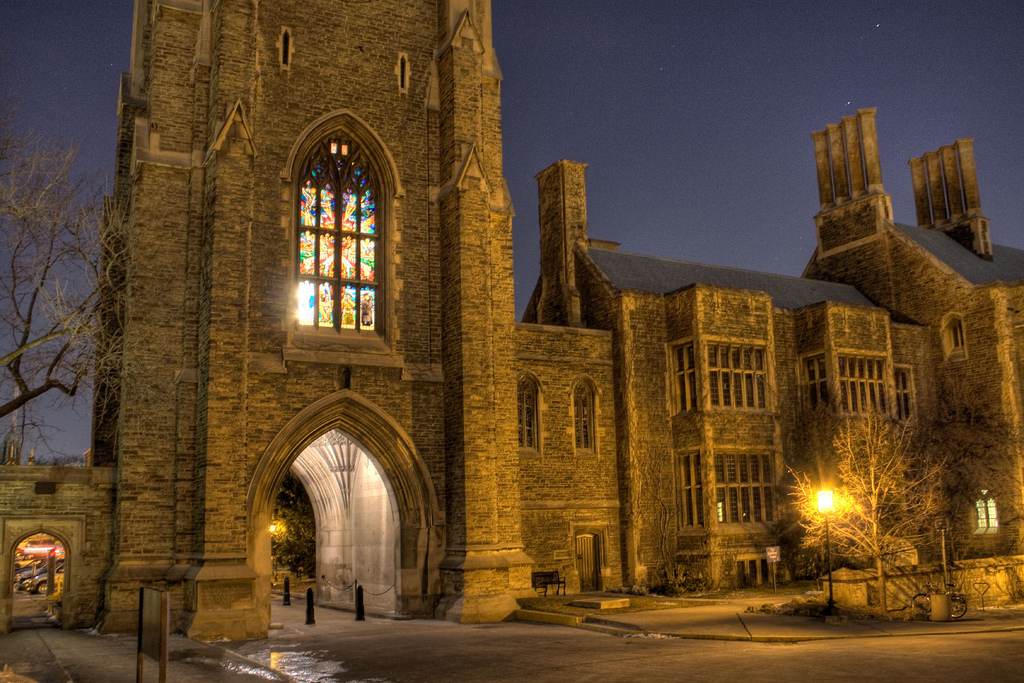
Hart House at night

"Hart House's system of governance is based on a commitment to collaborative and democratic decision-making." It is governed by the Board of Stewards, a deliberative body composed of the student secretaries of the standing committees of the House; a representative from the Finance Committee; the University of Toronto campus student governments; the chair of the Alumni Committee; a senior member from Recreational Athletics; the President of the university (or his/her designate); two appointees of the President; one appointee of the Governing Council; and the warden, who serves as the chief administrative officer of the house. In October 2022, Sherry Kulman was appointed Interim Warden, succeeding John F. Monahan. The Board of Stewards is responsible for the use of space in the house, approving the House's finances, and working with the warden to determine the strategic vision of Hart House. Students are a majority of the members of the Board of Stewards.

=== List of wardens ===
- Walter F. Bowles (1919–1921)
- J. Burgon Bickersteth (1921–1947)
  - seconded to duties in England with first Canadian Army HQ in England and later the British Army advising on troop training (May 1940 to June 1944)
- Nicholas Ignatieff (1947–1952) – died from a heart attack
- Joseph McCulley (1952–1965)
- E. Arnold Wilkinson (1965–1972)
- J. G. Langelle (1972–1977)
- Richard M. H. Alway (1977–1990)
- Paul McCann (Acting Warden) (1990–1992)
- Peter Turner (1992–1997)
- Margaret Hancock (1997–2007)
- Louise Cowin (2007 to 2011)
- Bruce Kidd (2011–2015)
- John F. Monahan (2015–2022)
- Sherry Kulman (Interim Warden) (2022–2023)
- David Kim (2023–)

== Justina M. Barnicke Gallery ==
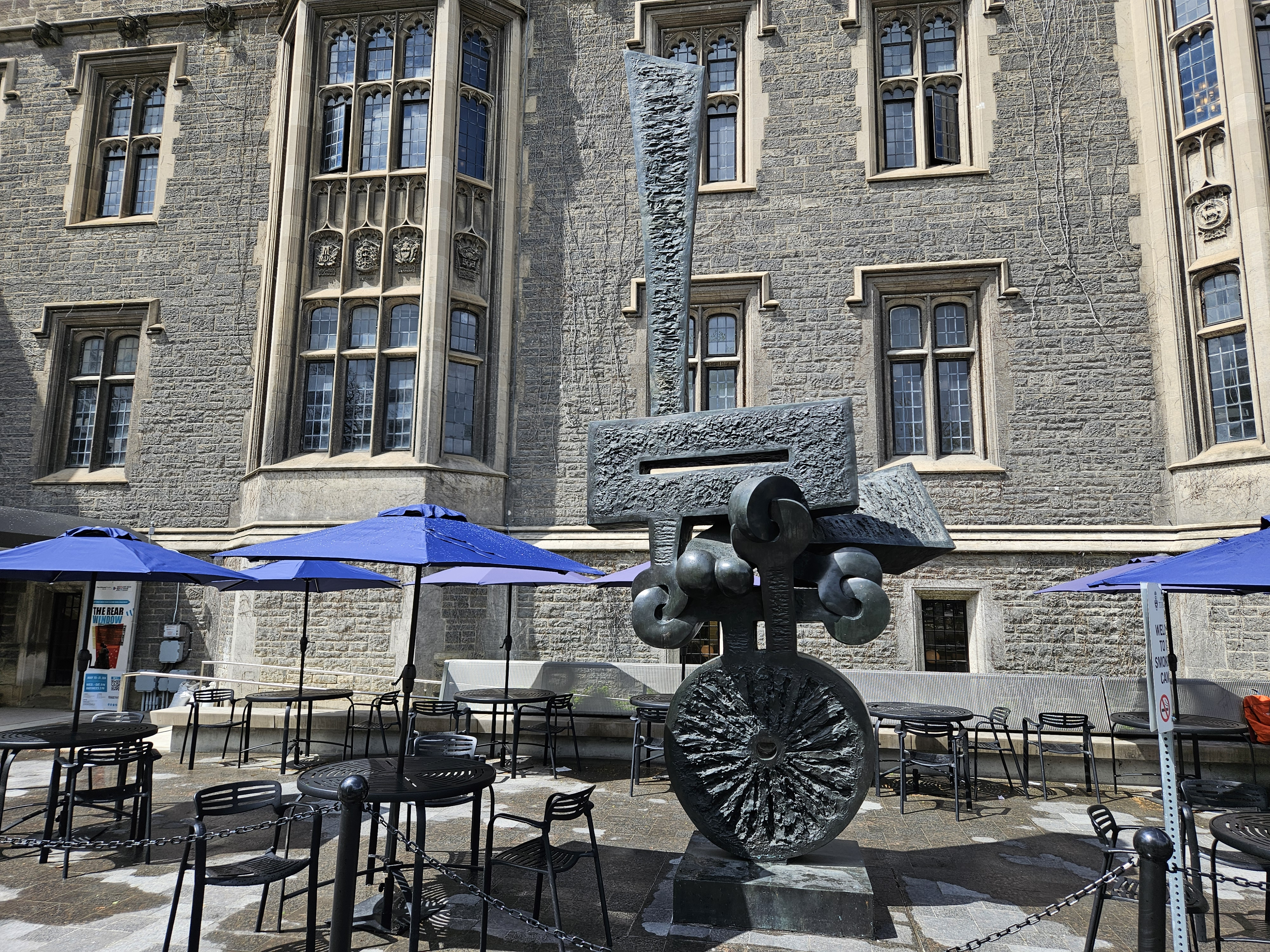
Sculpture outside Hart House, Toronto

The Art Museum at the University of Toronto comprises the Justina M. Barnicke Gallery (Hart House) and the University of Toronto Art Centre (University College). Located just a few steps apart, the two galleries were federated in 2014 and began operating under a new visual identity as the Art Museum at the University of Toronto, one of the largest gallery spaces for visual art exhibitions and programming in Toronto.

The Art Museum features a collection of historical and contemporary Canadian art, dating from 1921 to the present. Exhibits focus on contemporary Canadian art in all media. The gallery also hosts film screenings, lectures and performance art.

In addition to its regular exhibitions, the gallery houses an art collection that is valued at over CDN $10 million.

== Clubs and activities ==
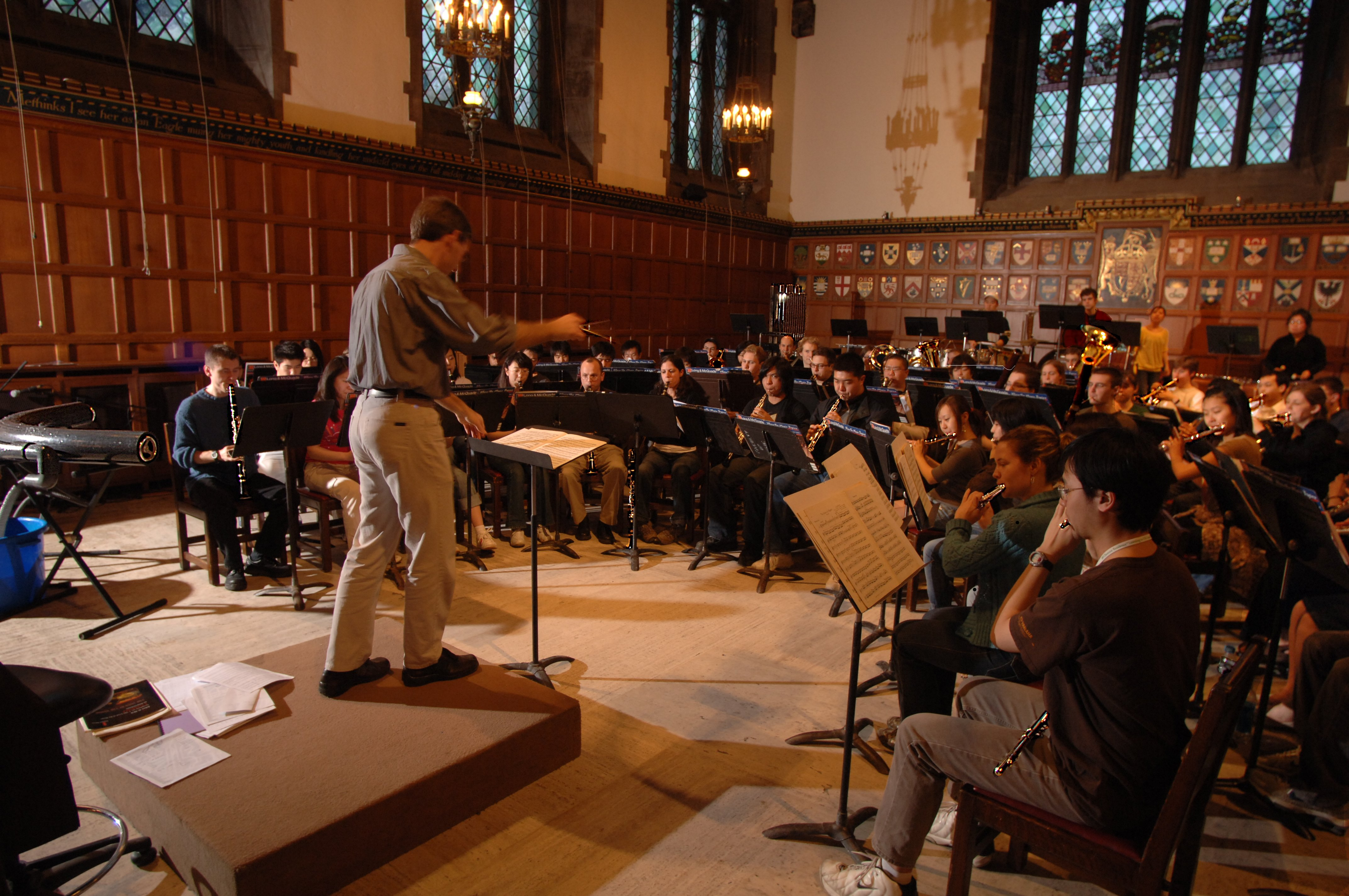
Hart House Symphonic Band rehearsal in the Great Hall

=== Hart House Chess Club ===
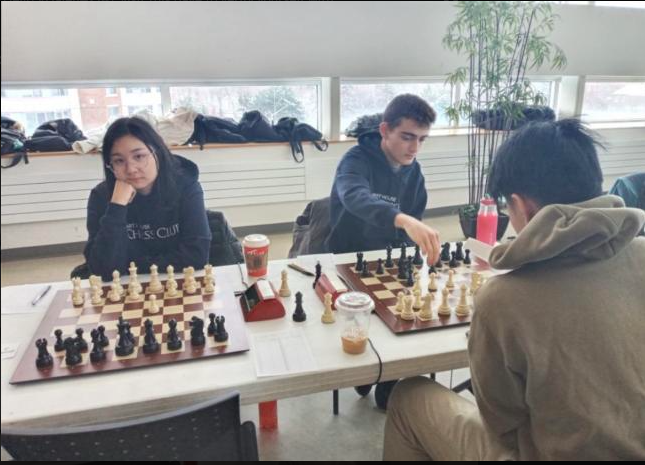
WIM Yunshan Li (Board 2 left) and IM Nicholas Vettese (Board 1, right) representing University of Toronto and the Hart House Chess Club in Ottawa during the 2023 Canadian University Chess Championship

Founded in 1895, the Hart House Chess Club is one of The University of Toronto's oldest, most high profile, and most successful clubs. It meets every Friday from 4 pm to 11 pm in Hart House's Reading Room for casual and serious play. Players of all skill levels are welcome. The chess club offers lectures by some of Canada's leading players as well as CFC-rated tournaments. The HHCC Chess Team has won the top title six times at the Pan American Intercollegiate Team Chess Championship.

Since its founding, the club has served host to numerous famous chess players throughout the years, including Paul Keres, Samuel Reshevsky, George Koltanowski, and World Chess Championship winners Bobby Fischer, Max Euwe, Mikhail Botvinnik, Boris Spassky and Evgeny Bareev.

=== Hart House Debating Club ===
In 1986, the University of Toronto Debating Union—a university-wide debating club dating back to the 1940s—approached the Hart House Debates Committee and came to an agreement that secured support for the Union from Hart House. The organization, renamed Hart House Debating Club, has ever since been the primary speech and debating society at the University of Toronto open to all students from all colleges and campuses.

Since its inception, the Hart House Debating Club has played host to leaders in every field, including heads of state, senior Cabinet officials, filmmakers, business leaders, activists, poets, policymakers, and philanthropists. Some of its most notable speakers include John F. Kennedy, Christopher Hitchens, Adrienne Clarkson, Noam Chomsky, John Turner, Brian Mulroney, John Tory, Margaret Atwood, Bob Rae, Elizabeth May, Bill Graham, Andrew Coyne, Margaret MacMillan, and Atom Egoyan.

The club has hosted dozens of prestigious tournaments, including the North American Debating Championship and the World Universities Debating Championship, the latter of which it has won twice: in 1981 and 2006. Hart House also hosts an annual intervarsity university debate tournament. The champions of the 2026 Hart House IV are Elizabeth Li from Stanford University and Will Ryan from UCLA.

=== Hart House Literary and Library Committee ===
This committee oversees many of the literary events that Hart House sponsors throughout the school year. These include the writing groups le mot juste and the Algonquin Square Table, as well as the Hart House Review. The Literary and Library Committee regularly hosts a writer-in-residence who leads workshops and reviews students' writings. The committee also runs a library, located on the second floor of Hart House. It features a variety of books for in-house research and leisure reading, and often is the venue for public readings (also coordinated by the committee).

=== Hart House Music Committee ===
This committee oversees concerts and events of various types of music, including rock, reggae, and folk. The concerts are free for all members of the university community. Throughout the school year, the committee organizes six to ten concerts. These events are a growing part of Hart House. The committee's aim is to bring the entire music community together from all campuses. Hart House also organizes open mics which are open to all. These events are considered a "must see" for all first year students.

=== Hart House Review ===
The Hart House Review (HHR) is a Canadian literary journal published by student members of Hart House at the University of Toronto and printed by Coach House Press. The magazine is best known for prose, poetry and photography contributed by emerging writers and artists in Canada. Rohinton Mistry, Camilla Gibb, Lynn Crosbie and similarly notable names in Canadian literature have been published in the HHR. The review also hosts lecture and reading events that feature established and emerging figures in Canadian literature and publishing.

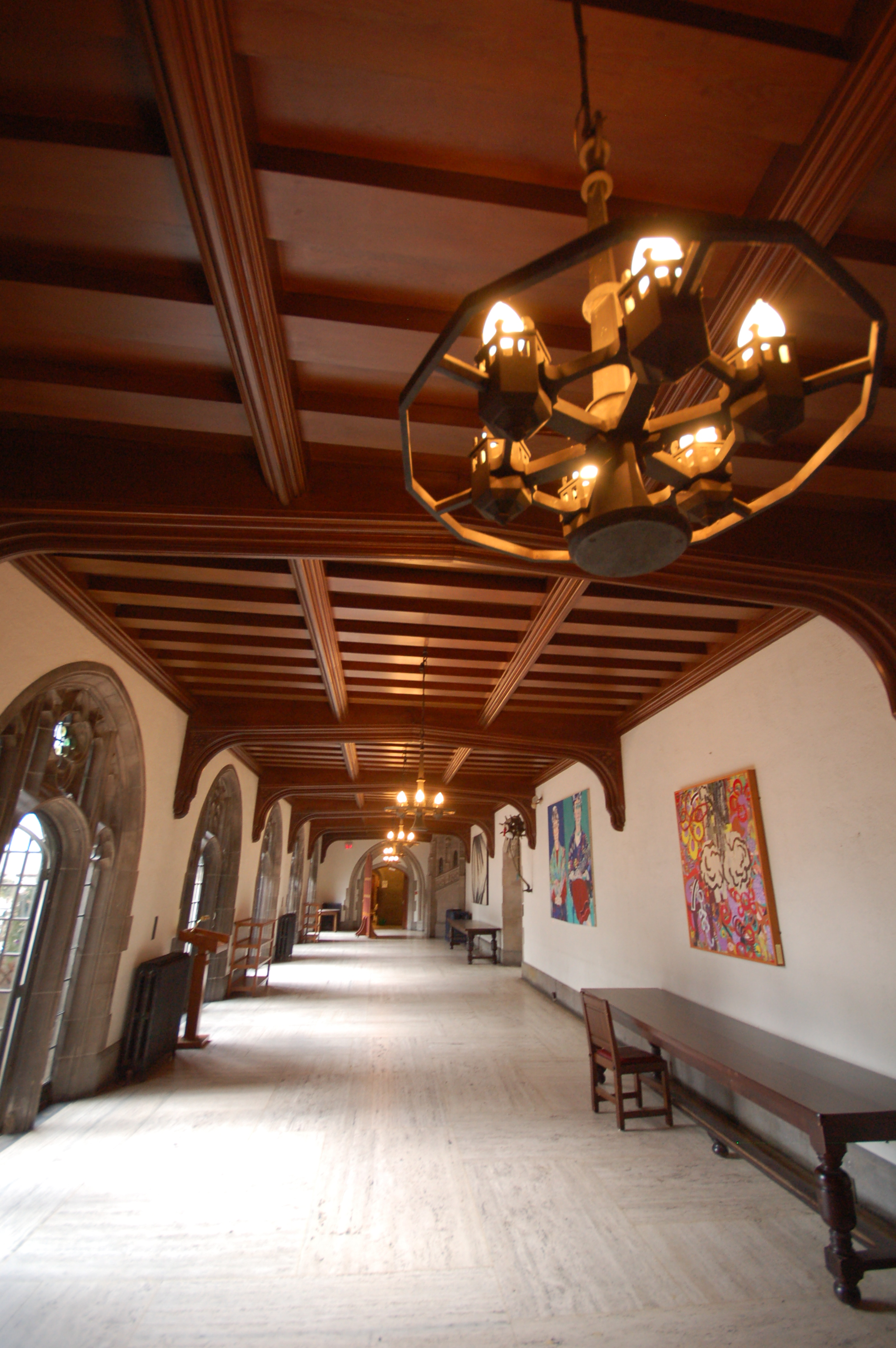
View of a hallway that borders the Hart House quadrangle

=== Lecture series ===
The Hart House Hancock Lecture is an annual public lecture series. Delivered by a lecturer chosen by a committee of students, staff and alumni, it generally takes place in late March in the Great Hall of Hart House. The series was launched in 2001 to establish an annual public lecture at Hart House.

The lecturer for 2007 was McGill Professor Darin Barney, who delivered a lecture titled "One Nation Under Google: Citizenship in the Technological Republic" examining the relationship between technology and citizenship.

The lecturer for 2008 was Warchild Canada founder and U of T Professor Samantha Nutt lecturing on "The world is Our Backyard: Individual Responsibility for a Global Society". Dr. Nutt spoke about citizens' role as privileged North Americans and their ability to effect change in war-torn countries.

Other past lecturers have included Michael Geist (2006), David Bornstein (2005), Jennifer Welsh, (2004), Alan Lightman (2002) and Pico Iyer (2001).

Copies of some of the past lectures are available online.

=== Theatre ===
Hart House Theatre is often referred to as the cradle of Canadian Theatre. Opening in November 1919, the Art Deco theatre on the University of Toronto's St. George campus quickly became a leader in the Canadian "Little Theatre" movement of the 1920s and 1930s. Hart House Theatre cultivated and featured some of the country's finest actors, directors, playwrights and designers of the Pre-World War II era, including Raymond Massey, Dora Mavor Moore, Lloyd Bochner, Lawren Harris, Arthur Lismer, Wayne and Shuster and Merrill Denison. After the war, Hart House Theatre, under the direction of Robert Gill, became an extracurricular student theatre and for twenty years turned out a new generation of stage professionals. William Hutt, Don Harron, Kate Reid, David Gardner, Arthur Hiller, Donald Sutherland, Norman Jewison and Lorne Michaels all got their start on the Hart House stage.

By the mid-1960s the theatre joined the world of academia with the creation of the Graduate Centre for Study of Drama. A new generation of students combined dramatic literature with practical theatre experience, and learned from and contributed to the vibrant Toronto theatre scene of the 1970s.

Today Hart House Theatre is the focal point for the performing arts at the University of Toronto. With more than a thousand students participating each year in its extra-curricular season of drama, dance, music and film, Hart House Theatre continues to attract each new generation. The performances are often reviewed by art critics, and often sell out.

=== Hart House Orchestra ===
Since 1976, the HHO has provided an opportunity for members of the University of Toronto community with musical interest and training, to fellowship and perform challenging symphonic works.

The orchestra is composed of 80 to 90 musicians. Membership is determined annually by audition, open to university students at all levels of study, alumni, faculty, staff and Hart House senior members. In a typical season, the orchestra performs three concerts at home and one in another city in Ontario or Quebec. Past concert tour destinations have included Montreal, Ottawa, Kingston, Windsor, London, Guelph and Sudbury. On a few special occasions, the orchestra has toured to Carnegie Hall, New York City; Tübingen, Düsseldorf and Göttingen, Germany; Chicago, Illinois; and Ann Arbor, Michigan. Organizational operations are run by a committee of nominated volunteer orchestra members.

On an annual basis the orchestra runs two concerto competitions, one internal (open to its membership) and one external (open to the community). The winning soloists perform with the orchestra, usually in the following season.

=== Hart House Film Board ===
This popular club helps its members make movies through equipment rental and instruction, as well as group projects (such as the New Filmmaker's Project) and screenings. Atom Egoyan and Babak Payami made their first films using Hart House Film Board equipment. Since 2006 The Hart House Film Board has offered an extensive series of film training classes.

=== Other features ===
The captivating beauty of Hart House has made it a popular location for weddings, professional conferences and other events. Hart House also has a barbershop for students. Hart House also owns and manages a 150-acre (0.61 km^{2}) farm in the Caledon Hills on the ridge of the Niagara Escarpment. The farm has long been a popular retreat.

== Notable visitors ==
King George VI and Queen Elizabeth touring Hart House in 1939

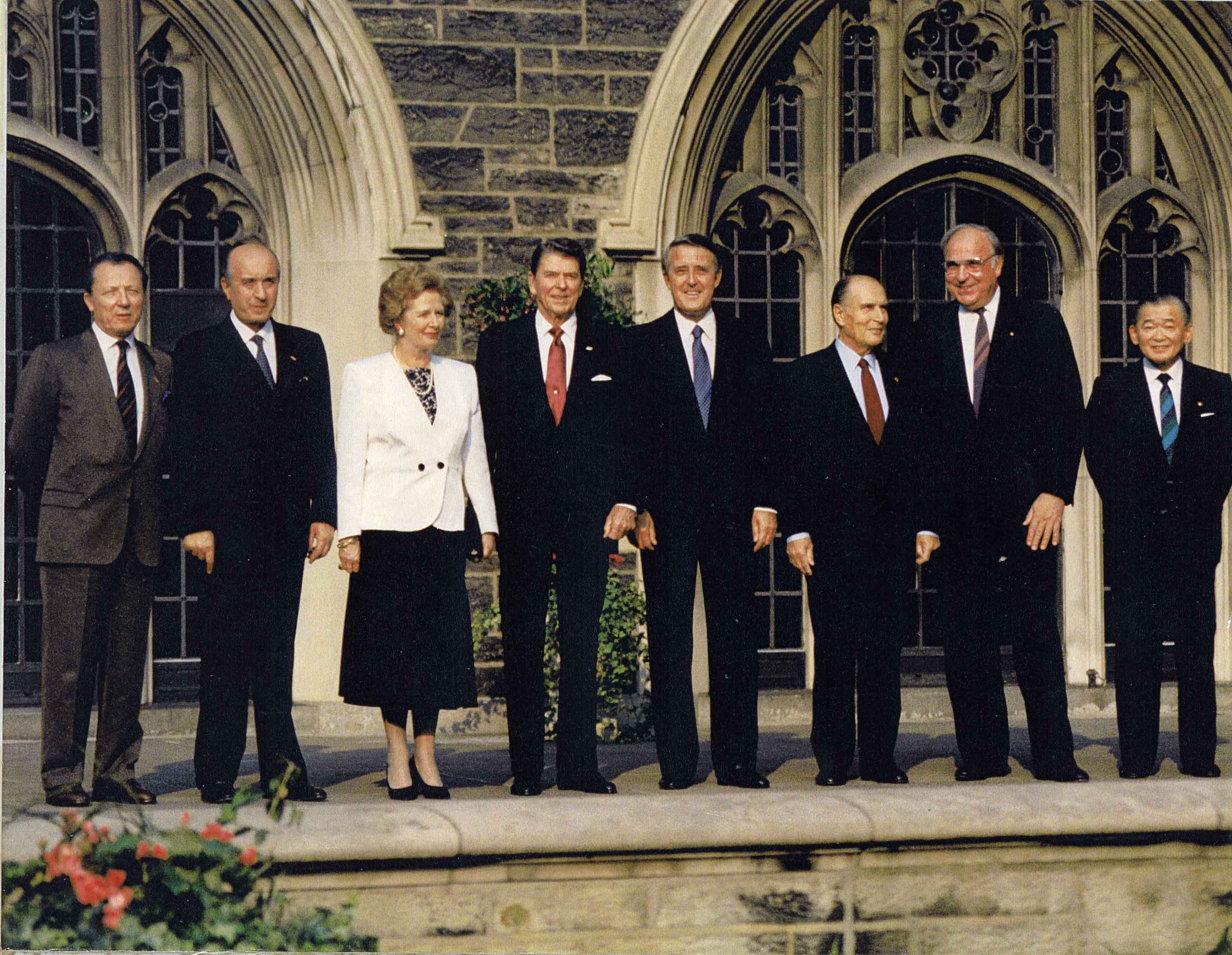
World leaders at the 14th G7 summit in 1988: Jacques Delors, Ciriaco De Mita, Margaret Thatcher, Ronald Reagan, Brian Mulroney, François Mitterrand, Helmut Kohl and Noboru Takeshita

Since 1919, nearly all dignitaries visiting Hart House signed its guest book. In 2007, the original leather-bound book finally ran out of pages and had to be replaced.

The first royal visitor to Hart House was Prince Edward, Prince of Wales, who played squash with students there in 1924. In 1939, King George VI and Queen Elizabeth toured the campus and lunched at Hart House. Elizabeth II made the first of several visits as a princess in 1951.

Several individuals have signed the guest book more than once during separate visits to Hart House. Notable visitors include:

- Dwight D. Eisenhower
- Ronald Reagan
- John F. Kennedy
- Thomas Mann
- Stephen Leacock
- Henry Moore
- Seamus Heaney
- Octavio Paz
- John Kenneth Galbraith
- Christopher Hitchens
- Edmund Hillary
- King George VI
- Queen Elizabeth II

== See also ==
- List of University of Toronto buildings
- Survivors Are Not Heroes, installed outside the building
