= Sorel Etrog =

Romanian born Israeli-Canadian artist, writer and sculptor (1933–2014)

- Born: August 29, 1933; Iaşi, Kingdom of Romania
- Died: February 26, 2014 (aged 80); Toronto, Ontario, Canada
- Education: Institute of Painting and Sculpture, Tel Aviv; Brooklyn Museum of Art
- Known for: Sculptor; painter; writer; book illustrator
- Notable work: Designer of award for the Canadian Film Awards
- Spouse: Lika Behar (married 1967)
- Awards: Order of Canada, Ordre des Arts et des Lettres

Sorel Etrog, CM RCA (August 29, 1933 – February 26, 2014) was a Romanian-born Israeli-Canadian artist, writer, and primarily, a sculptor. He specialized in modern art works and contemporary sculpture. Etrog's works explore his first-hand experience of the Second World War, the renewal of sculptural traditions in modern art, such as the use of bronze as a medium, and the opposition between the mechanical and the organic. One of Canada's leading artists in the 1960s, Etrog contributed to the country's growing interest in sculpture.

== Life ==
Born in Iaşi, Romania, in 1933, Etrog's formal art training began in 1945. In 1950, his family immigrated to Israel, where beginning in 1953 he studied at the Institute of Painting and Sculpture in Tel Aviv. His first solo exhibition in Tel Aviv in 1958 earned him a scholarship at the Brooklyn Museum of Art in New York City (1958-1963). In 1959, a meeting with Toronto art collector Samuel Zacks led to Etrog's first Canadian solo exhibition, at Gallery Moos in Toronto. Leaving New York for Toronto in 1963, Etrog became a Canadian citizen. After moving to Florence in 1965, he began casting his sculptures at the Michelucci Foundry, in Pistoia, and would continue to do so for the rest of his career. During this time, Etrog frequently visited his family in Israel. On one of his trips he met his future wife, Lika Behar, a fashion designer, who moved to Florence to live with him. However, a car accident that left Etrog badly injured led him and Behar to leave Florence in 1967 and move to Toronto, where they married.

== Career ==
Since the late 1950s, Etrog's work has been exhibited extensively in solo and group exhibitions across Canada and internationally.

Etrog's work is represented in major capitals and cities all over the world. He received several important commissions, including those for Expo 67, Montreal; SunLife Centre, Toronto; Windsor Sculpture Garden, Windsor, Ontario; Los Angeles County Museum of Art; and Olympic Park in Seoul, South Korea. His commission for the 1988 Summer Olympics in Seoul, entitled Powersoul, is his largest work. In 1966, works by Etrog, along with those of Alex Colville and Yves Gaucher, represented Canada at the Venice Biennale. In 1968 Etrog was commissioned to design the Canadian Film Award that was originally named the "Etrog" and later renamed the "Genie".

Etrog is also known for his writings and published plays, poetry and non-fiction. Of his many collaborations, the most acclaimed are his book illustrations for Eugène Ionesco and Samuel Beckett in the late 1960s. Etrog and Marshall McLuhan collaborated on the publication Spiral, drawn from Etrog's film of the same title which was broadcast on CBC television in 1975.

Numerous reviews, articles, monographs and catalogue texts have been written about Etrog, including Pierre Restany’s comprehensive textbook published by Prestel 2001. A major exhibition of Etrog's paintings and drawings of the 1960s was exhibited in March 2008 at Buschlen Mowatt Gallery, Vancouver. The Art Gallery of Ontario presented a major retrospective of Etrog's work in 2013, which coincided with his eightieth birthday.

From August 2021 to May 2022, Art Windsor Essex showcased Etrog's history of graphic work (drawings, paintings, prints) in their exhibition, Links as Bones: Sorel Etrog and the Fragile Body.

== Death and legacy ==
Sorel Etrog died on February 26, 2014, aged 80. Since his death, Sorel Etrog's legacy and collection are officially managed by The Estate of Sorel Etrog. The Jay & Barbara Hennick Family Wellness Centre at the Mount Sinai Hospital in Toronto, Ontario, Canada, includes close to 100 artworks by Sorel Etrog as part of its health and well-being intervention program.

== Works ==
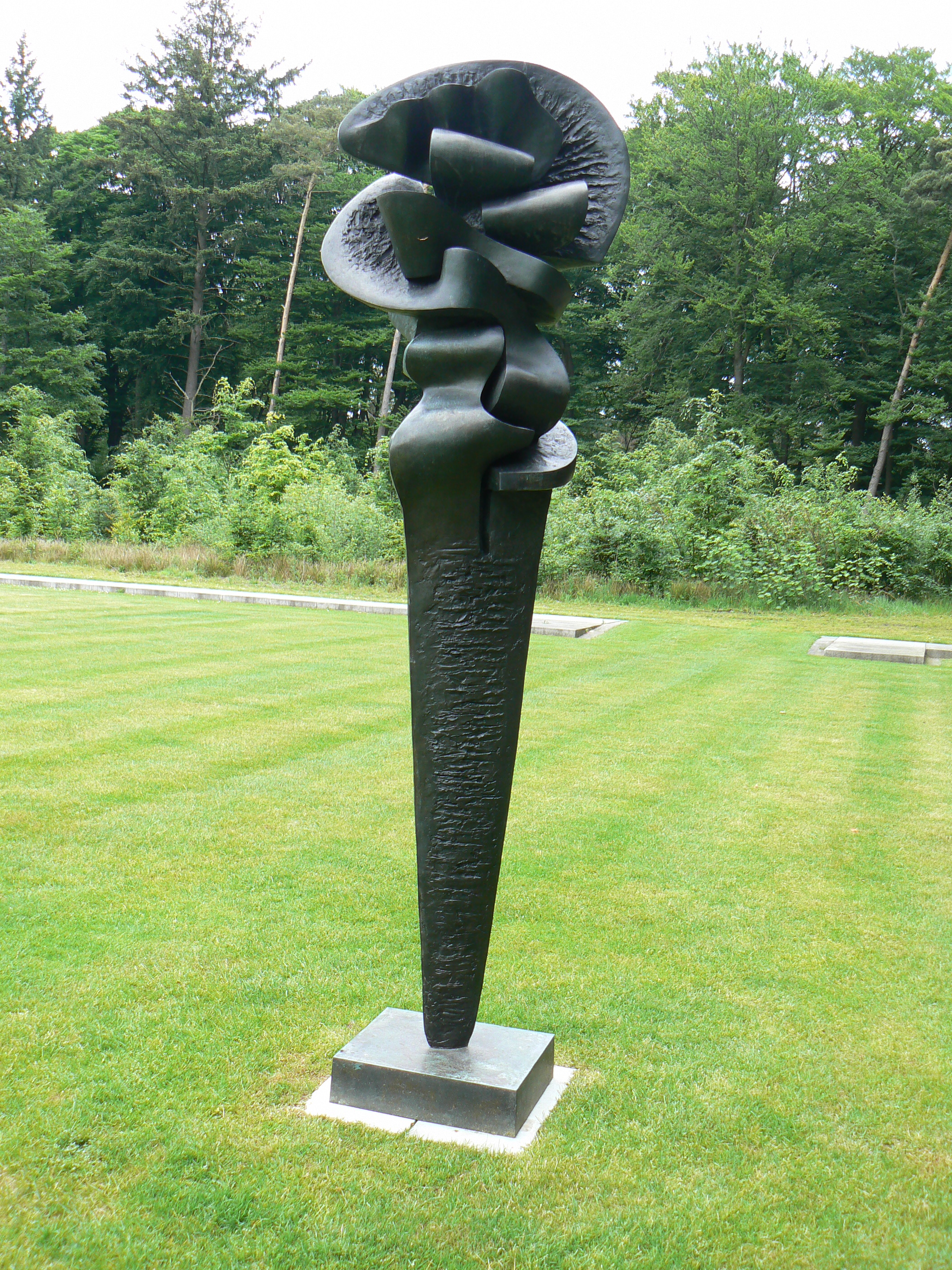
Sorel Etrog's Complexes of a young lady (1960/62)

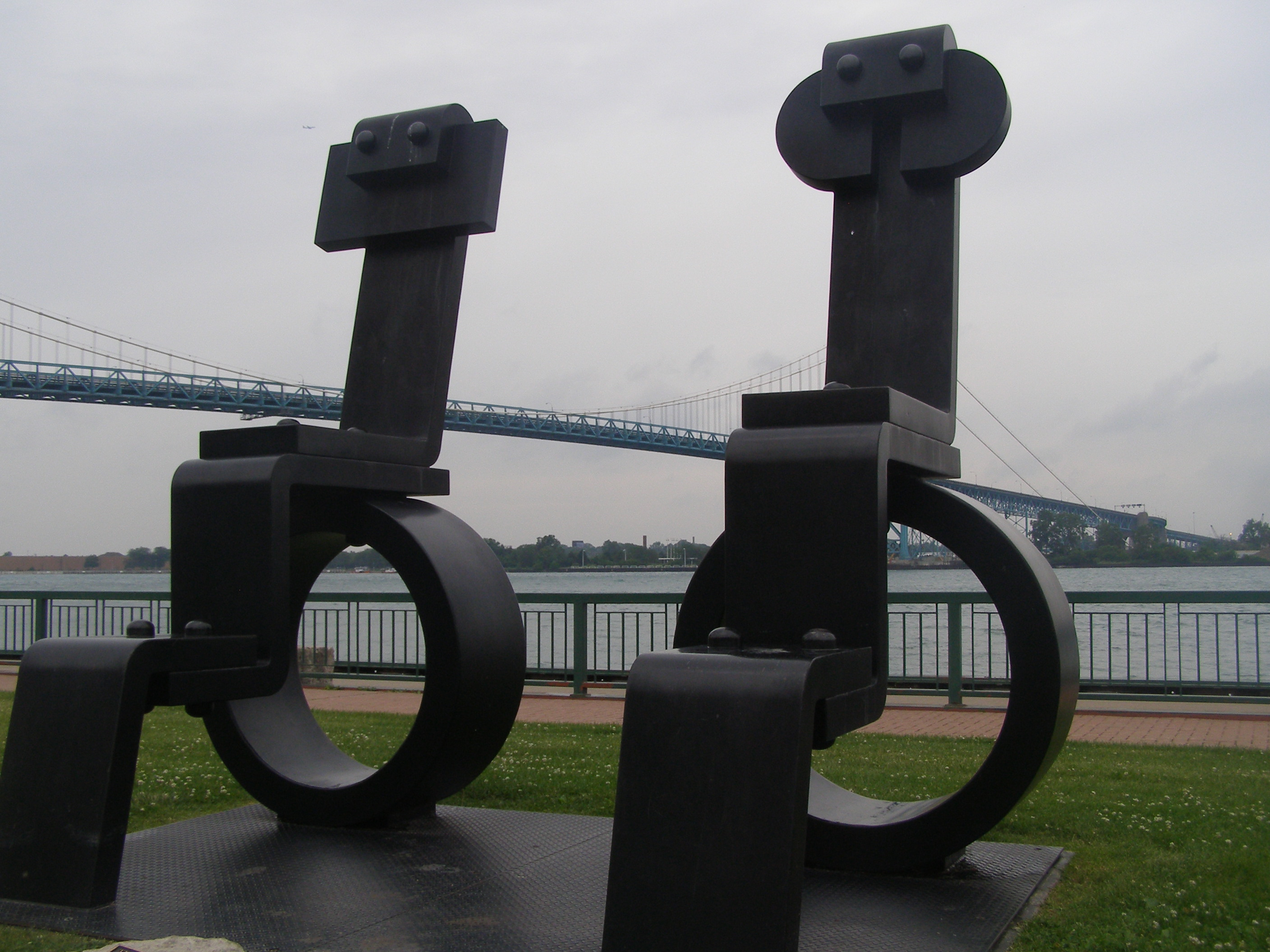
Sorel Etrog's sculpture in Odette Sculpture Park Windsor Canada.

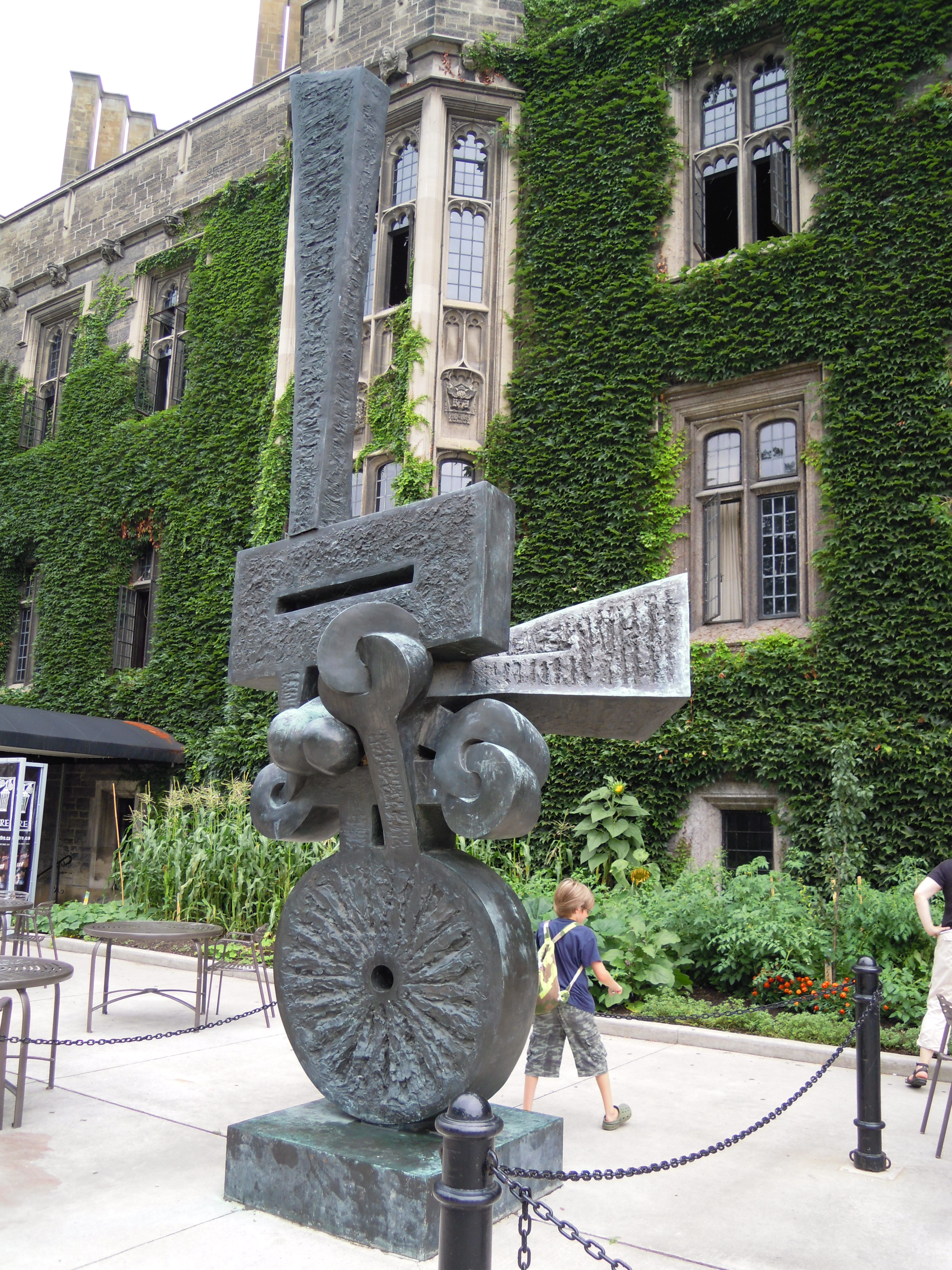
Survivors Are Not Heroes (1967)

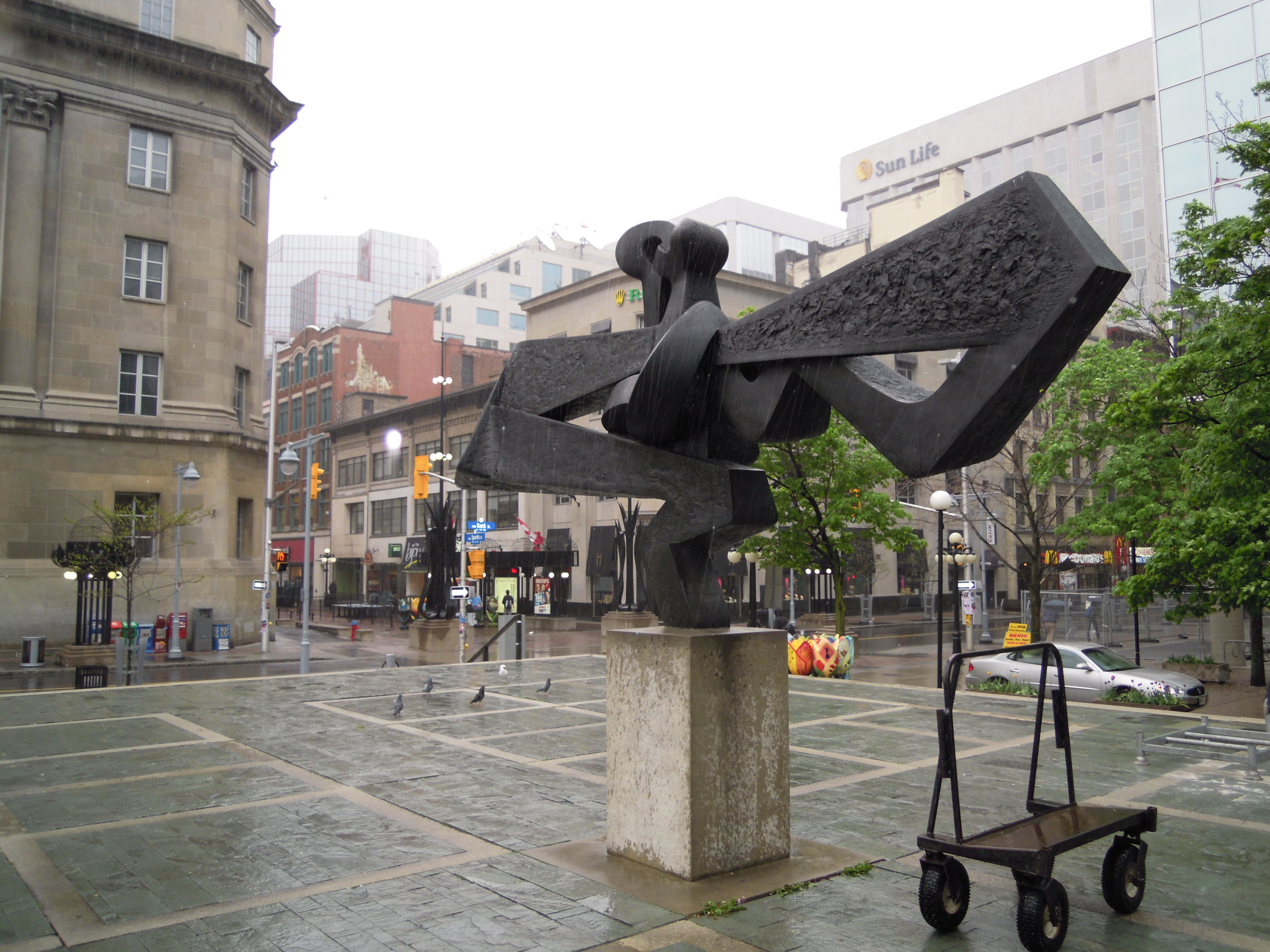
Sorel Etrog's sculpture Flight was commissioned by the Pavilion of Canada, Expo 67, and is now part of the Bank of Canada collection.

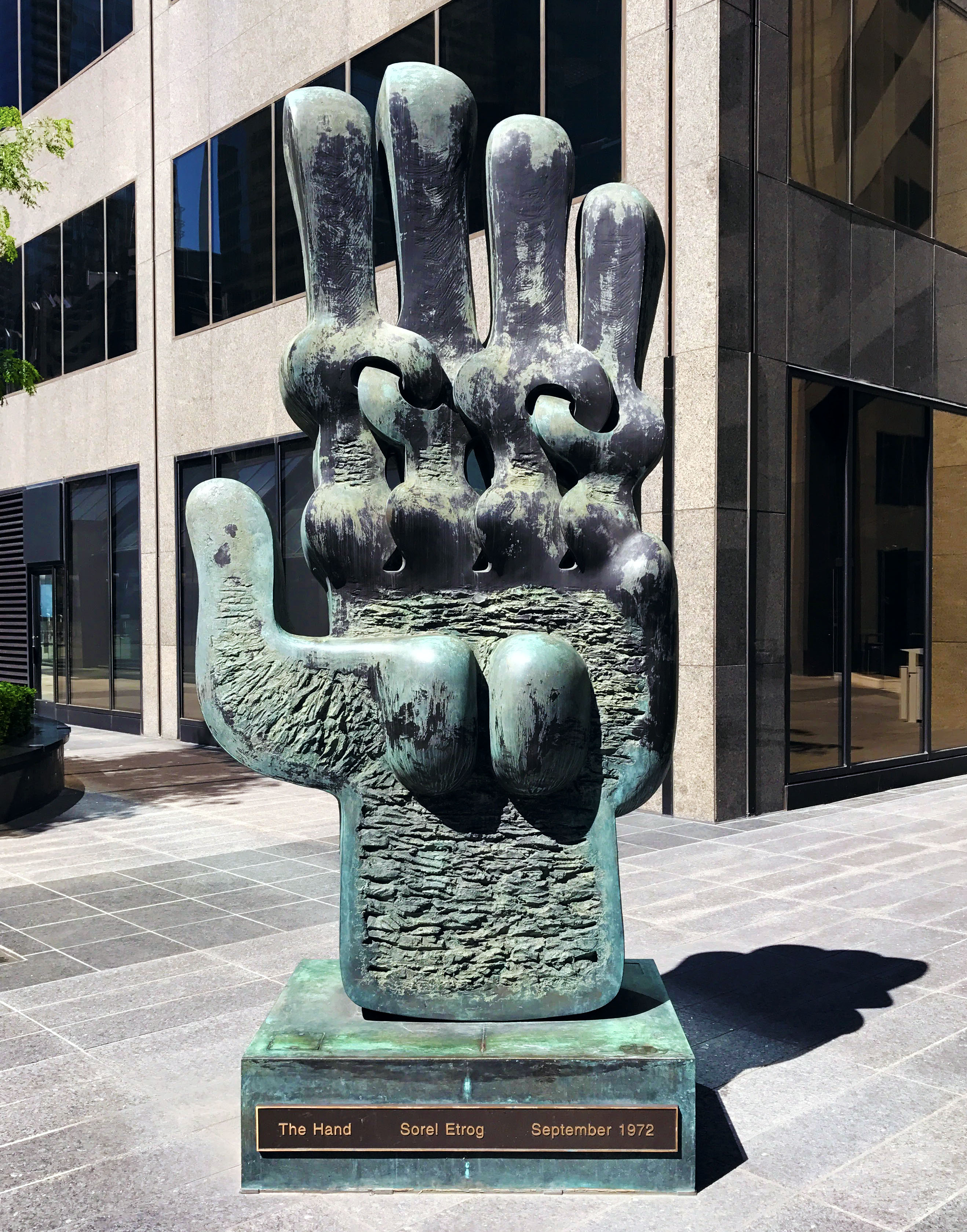
Sorel Etrog's The Hand in Toronto (1972)

== Honours ==
- Member of the Order of Canada, 1994
- Chevalier of the Ordre des Arts et des Lettres, Government of France, 1996
- Royal Canadian Academy of Arts

== Bibliography ==
- Belton, Robert (1996). "Etrog, Sorel". In Jane Turner (ed.). The Dictionary of Art. Vol. 10. London: Macmillan. p. 582. ISBN 1-884446-00-0.
- Etrog, Sorel; Pierre Restany (2001). Sorel Etrog. London: Prestel. ISBN 3-7913-2499-3.
- Mikulinsky, Alma. Sorel Etrog: Life & Work [online publication]. Toronto: Art Canada Institute, 2019. ISBN 9781487102227.
