= Hart House Review =

Canadian literary magazine

- Editor: Allison Zhao
- Categories: Literary magazine
- Publisher: Hart House, University of Toronto
- Founded: 1991
- Country: Canada
- Based in: Toronto
- Language: English
- Website: harthousereview.ca
- ISSN: 1202-6220
- OCLC: 31892552

The Hart House Review is an annual Canadian literary magazine published by Hart House, a student life centre at the University of Toronto, and printed at Coach House Press.

The annual, student-produced journal ensures at least 70% of its content comes from University of Toronto contributors. Notable past contributors include Reza Baraheni, George Elliot Clarke, Lynn Crosbie, Howard Davies, Camilla Gibb, Nadine Gordimer, Sheila Heti, Jim Johnstone, Daniel MacIvor, Lee Maracle, Andrew McEwan, Rohinton Mistry, Albert F. Moritz, Simon Ortiz, John Reibetanz, Ray Robertson, Colm Tóibín, Priscilla Uppal, Myna Wallin, Kira Wronska Dorward, Carleton Wilson, Jacob Wren, and Rachel Zolf.

Past Editors-in-Chief include Alana Wilcox (1991–92), Jackie Linton (2010), Andre Babyn (2011), Kira Wronska Dorward (2012), Clara Wells-Vershuchen (2014), Eva Wissting (2021-22), Bruce Crown (2022-23), and Allison Zhao (2023-present).

In 2012, HHR became open to the Canadian public after becoming a member of Magazines Canada and being distributed nationally thanks to the efforts of its then Editor-in-Chief, Kira Wronska Dorward.

The magazine was established in 1991. It publishes the winners of the annual Hart House Contests in Poetry and Fiction, as well as the winner of the annual E. J. Pratt Prize in Poetry.
