= Hydraulophone =

Hydraulic musical instrument

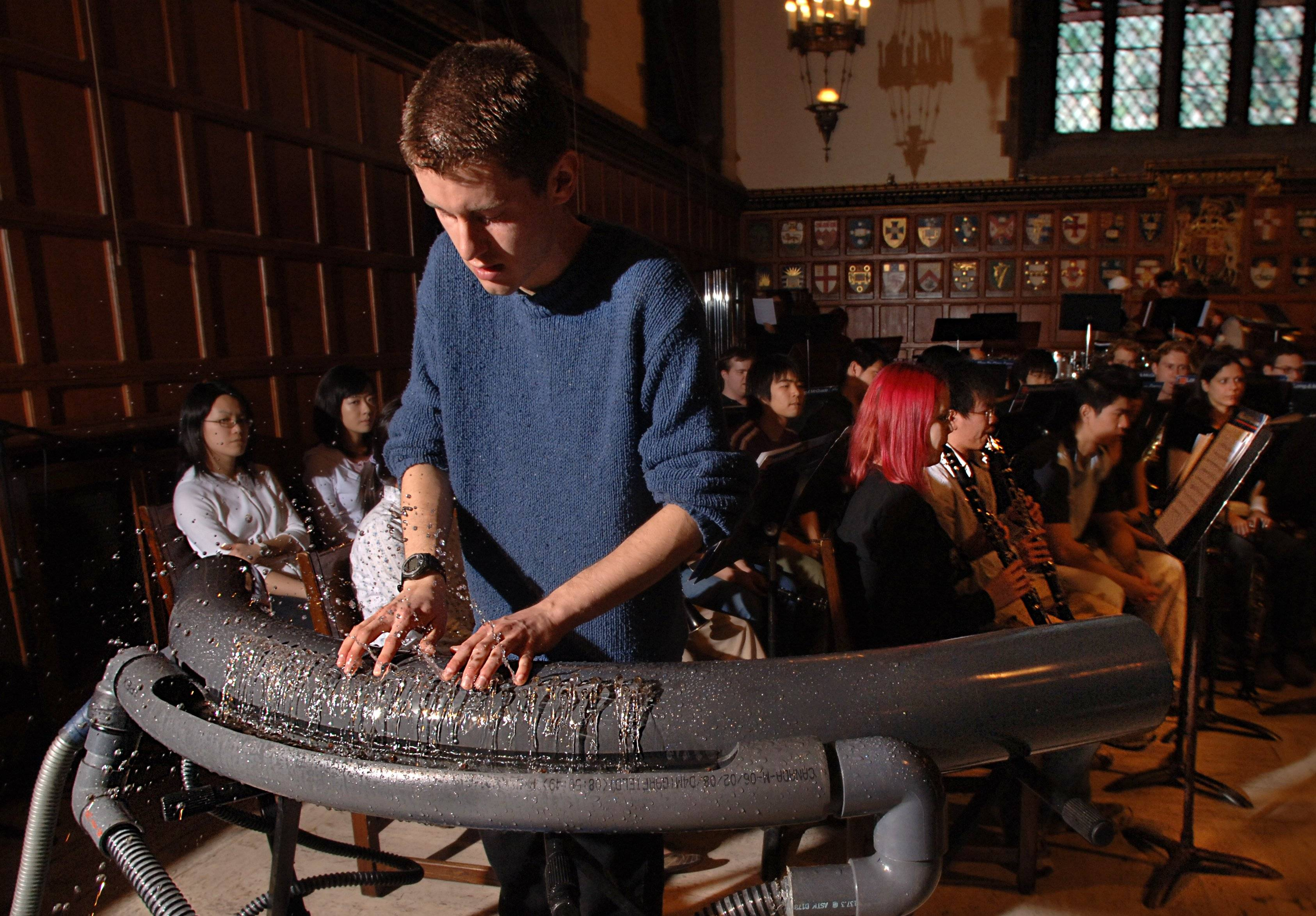
- Ryan Janzen, playing a hydraulophone with Hart House Symphonic Band

Other instrument
- Classification: Water; Woodwater; Single-reed; Double-reed
- Hornbostel–Sachs classification: NaN (Hydraulophone)

Playing range
- Basic range of a diatonic hydraulophone with 12 water jets: More detailed ranges and co appear below.

Related instruments
- Flute; Glass harmonica; Pipe organ

Builders
- Splashtones

A hydraulophone is a tonal acoustic musical instrument played by direct physical contact with water (sometimes other fluids) where sound is generated or affected hydraulically. The hydraulophone was described and named by Steve Mann in 2005, and patented in 2011. Typically, sound is produced by the same hydraulic fluid in contact with the player's fingers. It has been used as a sensory exploration device for low-vision individuals.

== Types and basic operation ==
song is "Huron Carol"; "Une Jeune Pucelle"

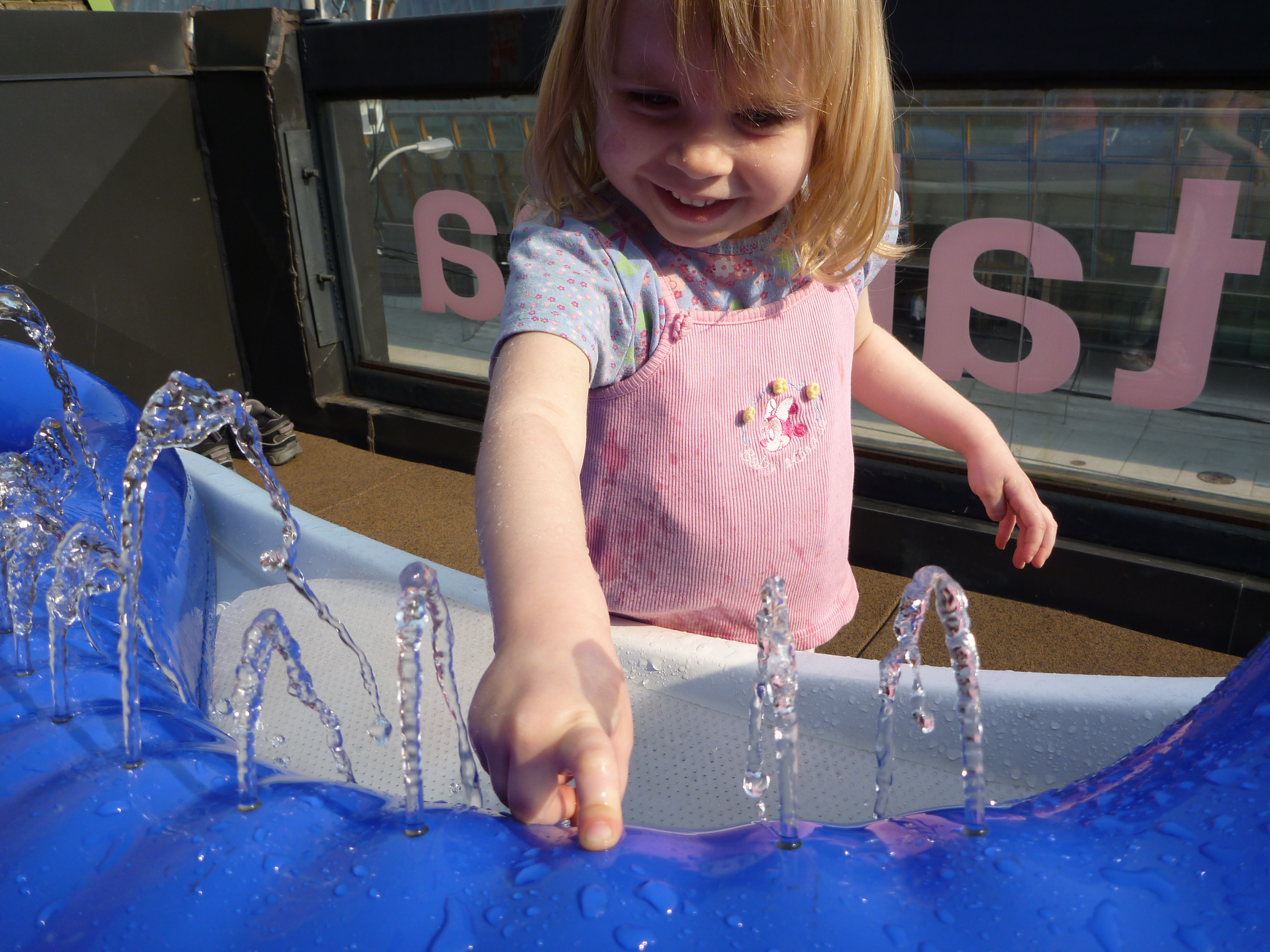
A young musician plays the hydraulophone by pressing on jets of water laid out to a musical scale.

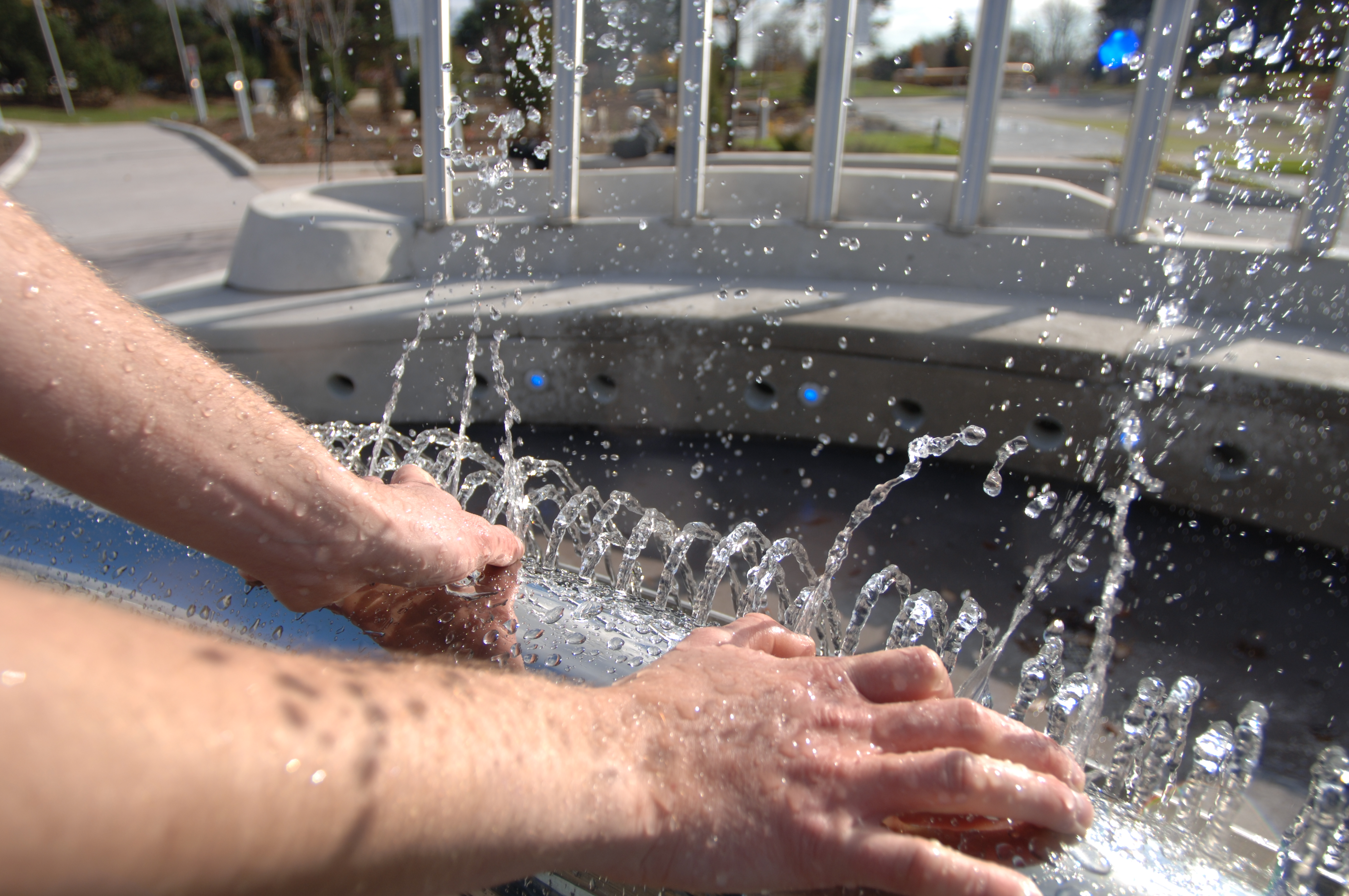
Waterflute (reedless) hydraulophone with 45 finger-embouchure holes, allowing an intricate but polyphonic embouchure-like control by inserting one finger into each of several of the instrument's 45 mouths at once

The term may be applied based on the interface used to play the instrument, in which a player blocks the flow of water through a particular hole in order to sound a particular note, or based on a hydraulic sound production mechanism. Hydraulophones use water-flow sound-producing mechanisms. They have a user interface, which is blocking water jets to produce sound. Those described in Mann's paper, Hydraulophone design considerations use water jets striking perforated spinning disks, shafts, or valves, to create a pulsating water flow, similar to a siren disk. A single disk, shaft, or valve assembly can have rings or passages with different numbers of holes for different notes. Some hydraulophones have reeds (one or more reeds for each finger hole) and some are reedless, having one or more fipple mechanisms associated with each finger hole, thus having no moving parts to wear out.

Blocking flow through a finger hole directs the water instead to one or more of the above-described sound-production mechanisms, or resulting changes in flow or pressure affect a separate sounding mechanism associated with each finger hole.

Blocking water from coming out of a given hole produces a given note, which, in some embodiments, is electrically amplified by a hydrophone. In one embodiment, there is a further processing of each hydrophone signal. Embodiments with various kinds of acoustic or optical pickups are also disclosed.

Some hydraulophones include an underwater hydrophone pickup to allow the sounds produced by the water to be electrically amplified. Electric amplification allows effects to be added (as with an electric guitar) as well as making the hydraulophone a hyper-acoustic instrument (that is, using computation to change the acoustic sound of the water into some other instrument).

=== Embouchure ===
The water must be "blown" into the hydraulophone by way of a pump which can be hand-operated, wind-operated, water-powered, or electric. Unlike woodwind instruments in which there is one mouthpiece at the entrance to the flute chamber, hydraulophones have mouthpieces at every exit port from the chamber.

Whereas internal ducted flutes have one fipple mechanism for the mouth of the player, along with several finger holes that share the one fipple mechanism, the hydraulophone has a separate mouth/mouthpiece for each finger hole. A typical park hydraulophone for installation in public spaces has 12 mouths, whereas a concert hydraulophone typically has 45 mouths.

Embouchure is controlled by way of the instrument's mouth, not the player's mouth such that the player can sing along with the hydraulophone (i.e. a player can sing and play the instrument at the same time). Moreover, the instrument provides the unique capability of polyphonic embouchure, where a player can dynamically "sculpt" each note by the shape and position of each finger inserted into each of the mouths. For example, the sound is different when fingering the center of a water jet than when fingering the water jet near the periphery of the circular mouth's opening.

== Relationships to other instruments ==
Kinematics and musical instruments

=== Woodwind ===
The hydraulophone is similar to a woodwind instrument, but it runs on incompressible (or less compressible) fluid rather than a compressible gas-like air. In this context, hydraulophones are sometimes called "woodwater" instruments regardless of whether or not they are made of wood (as woodwind instruments are often not made of wood).

=== Pipe organ ===
Many hydraulophones include a separate water-filled pipe for each note, and have sound-production means similar to pipe organs (but with water rather than air), while maintaining the flute like user interface (finger embouchure holes).

This form of hydraulophone is similar to an organ, but has water flowing through the pipes instead of air flowing through the pipes.

=== Piano ===
On a concert hydraulophone, the finger holes are arranged like the keys on a piano, i.e. there is a row of uniformly spaced holes close to the player, and a row of holes that are in groups of 2, 3, 2, 3, ..., a little further from the player. Whereas the piano and organ both have a similar kind of keyboard layout, the response ("key action") is different. Pianos tend to respond to velocity (how quickly a key is struck), whereas organs tend to respond to displacement (whether or not a key is pressed down). Hydraulophones tend to respond to the time-integral of displacement (total water flow), as well as to displacement, velocity, and to some degree jerk and jounce.

=== Instruments that use other states of water ===
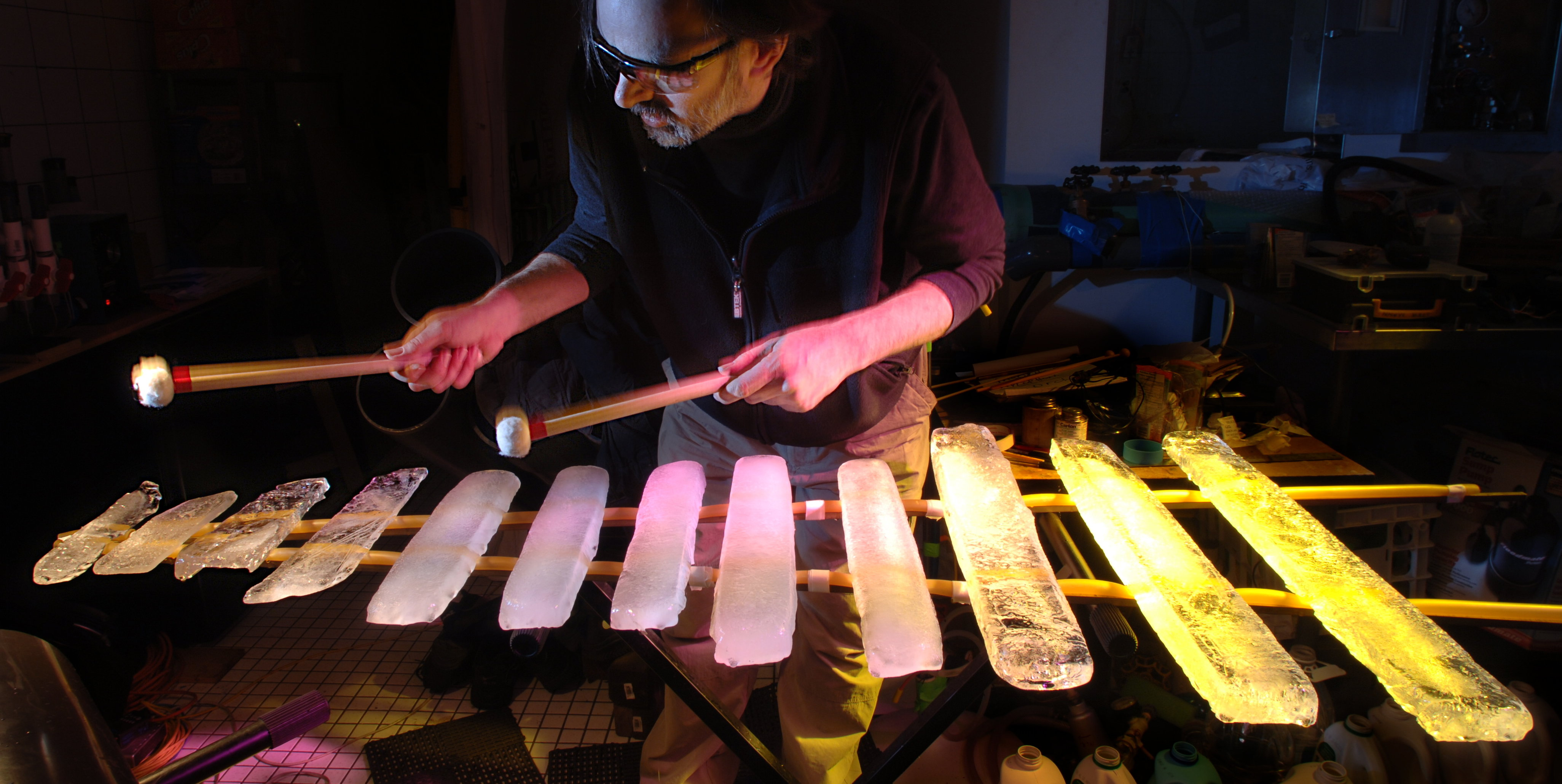
The pagophone uses ice, in contrast to the hydraulophone which typically uses liquid water

The hydraulophone uses liquid, typically water. However, other instruments utilize water in other physical states. The pagophone is an idiophone (similar to the xylophone) that uses bars made from frozen water. The calliope is a variation of the pipe organ which passes pressurized steam through large whistles.

== 12-jet diatonic ==
Many diatonic hydraulophones are built with 12 water jets, one for each of the instrument's 12 notes. The standard compass starts on A, extending up an octave and a half to E.

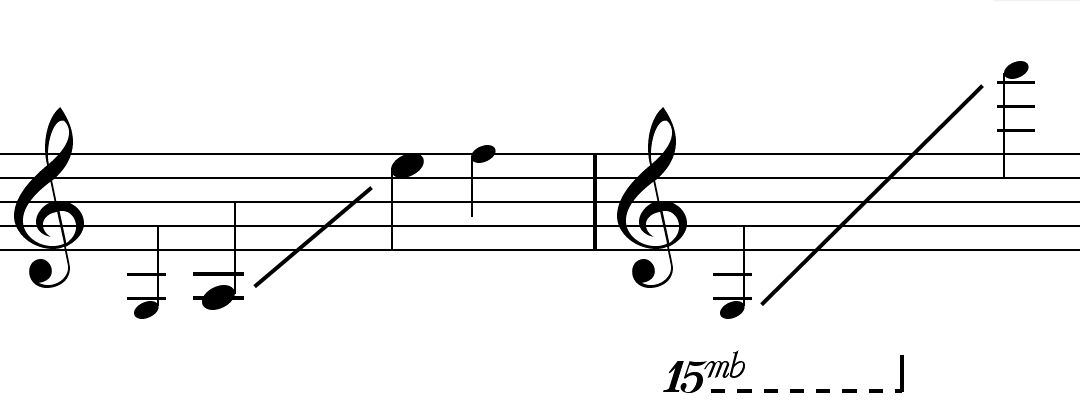
Extended playing ranges for a diatonic 12-water-jet hydraulophone

The standard A to E range, in which it is possible to play with polyphonic embouchure on any or all diatonic notes at the same time, is shown on the left side of the diagram. When playing only monophonically, some additional range is possible on certain hydraulophones, indicated here by small cue notes at the end-points.

Left, the extended notes come from closing key change valves or flexing key change levers, for sharping, and flattening. To play a low G, one must be playing in C minor (with A♭) and close the flattener valve simultaneously. When playing on the high E jet, closing the sharpener valve produces an F.

With change-valves, the diatonic hydraulophone is polyphonic in the same sense as a so-called "chromatic harmonica" – chords can be played, and all members of a chord can be moved down one semitone or up one semitone together, but the function of the valves is usually not separated to work on a per-note basis, so for example, one can play an A-minor chord, and flex the entire chord down to A-flat minor, but one cannot easily play an A major chord without the use of polyphonic embouchure to bend only the middle note to a C♯ (which requires more skill than the average hydraulist has). Thus the "diatonic" hydraulophone is called "diatonic" conservatively to "under promise and over-deliver".

Finally, on the right, the additional extended range comes from the two octave-change valves (all notes can be shifted as many as two octaves down, or one octave up).

=== Markings ===
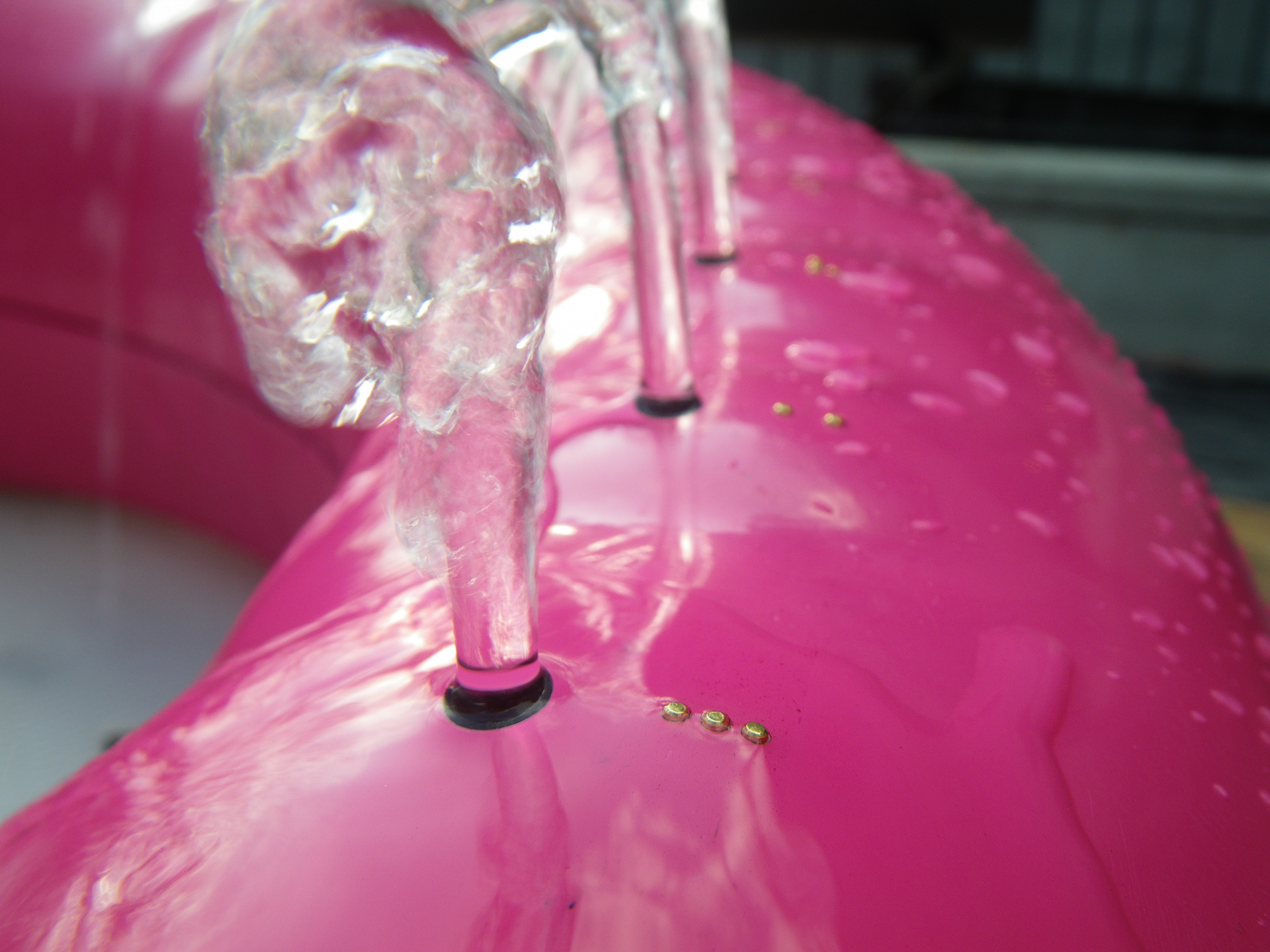
Braille markings above finger holes on a classroom hydraulophone used for teaching visually impaired students. The letter "L" denotes jet number 12 (rightmost in the sequence of 12 water jets).

Because the water-spray from hydraulophones obscures vision (or because hydraulophones are played underwater where visibility is poor), finger holes are sometimes encoded in Braille. Braille has the added advantage that the one-to-one correspondence between letters and numbers is the same as the standard A-minor hydraulophone, i.e. jet 1 is A, jet 2 is B, jet 3 is C, etc.. The skill (intricate sense of tactility) needed to play a hydraulophone well is also similar to the skill needed to read Braille.

(12 sets of dots typically made from brass pins above each finger hole)

== 45-jet chromatic / concert ==
Playing range of a 45-jet hydraulophone

Whereas park and pool hydraulophones are usually 12-jet diatonic, concert-hydraulophones are usually 45-jet chromatic.

45-jet hydraulophones have a 3 1/2 octave range of A to E, chromatic, plus an additional A-flat below the lowest A. The playing compass (45 water jets) is the same as the sounding range (45 notes).

12-jet hydraulophones are installed in public spaces, but there is a 45-jet hydraulophone at the Ontario Science Centre, a concert-hydraulophone having this precise range and compass.

== Themed ==
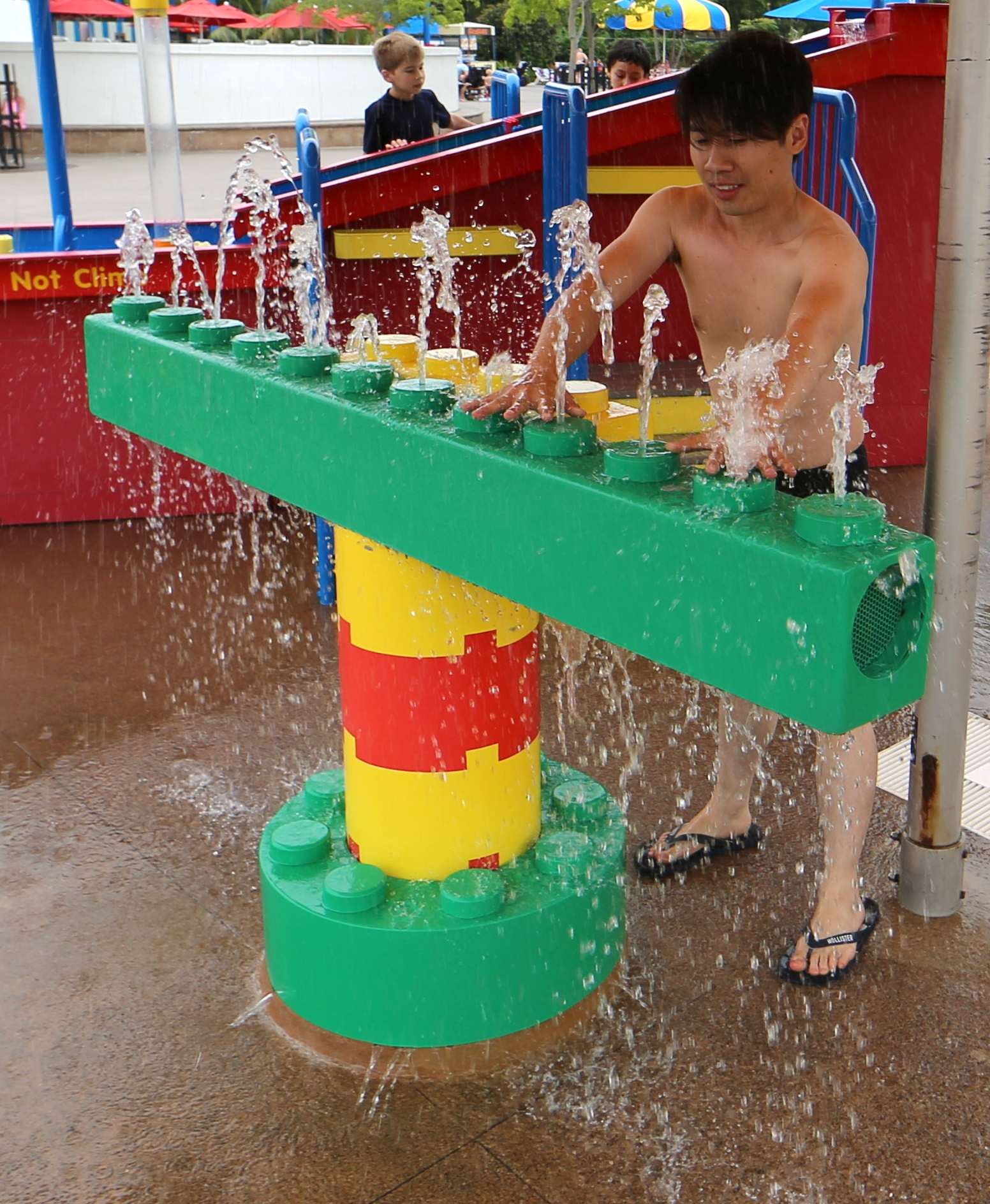
Aquatune Hydraulophone at the main entrance to the Legoland waterpark in Carlsbad California. This hydraulophone is in the shape of giant Lego blocks.

As public art installations, hydraulophones can be made in various themes and designs. An example of a theme-specific hydraulophone is the Aquatune located at the main entrance to the Legoland waterpark in Carlsbad California. This hydraulophone, which Legoland describes as "a musical water stand", is the centerpiece of the entranceway, and is flanked on either side by educational installation exhibits, such as water tables where participants can build water dams from Lego blocks, and learn about laminar and turbulent flows through various flow channels.

== Cold weather ==
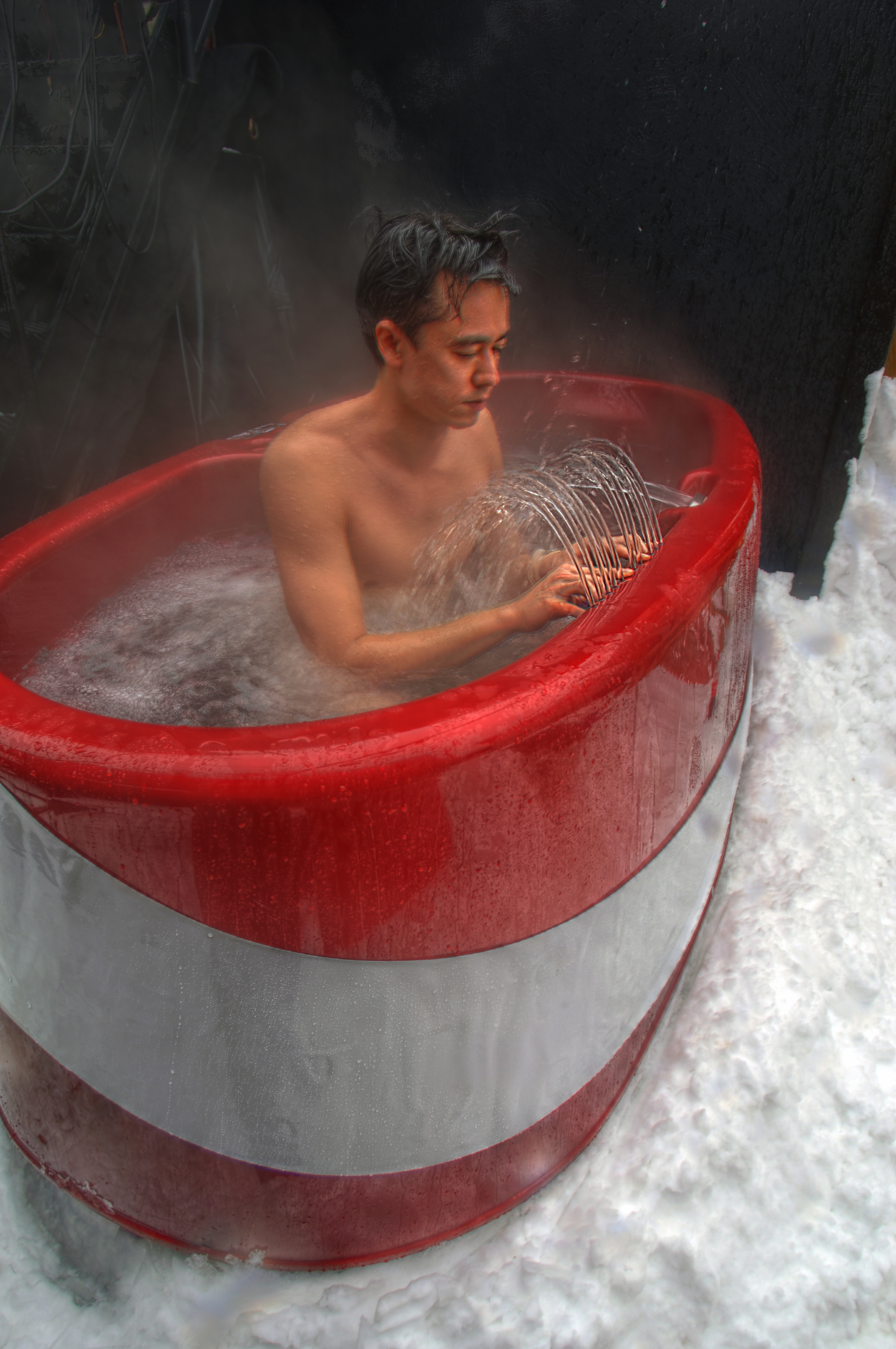
Hot tub hydraulophone

Hydraulophones may be built into hot tubs for use in cold weather. This solves the problem of keeping the hydraulist warm, as well as keeping the hydraulic fluid (e.g. water) heated by way of standard pumping and heating equipment. In this kind of hydraulophone (e.g. balnaphone, from the Greek "balnea" meaning "bath") the hydraulist is immersed in the hydraulic fluid used by the instrument.

== Percussion hydraulophone ==
Most hydraulophones sound continuously for as long as a finger hole is blocked. However, the WaterHammer hydraulophone produces sound from impact (water hammer) that dies down after being initially struck, thus sounding more like a piano than the more typical "underwater pipe organ" hydraulophone.

The WaterHammer Hydraulophone uses the water hammer principle for hard-hitting percussive musical notes.

== World's largest ==
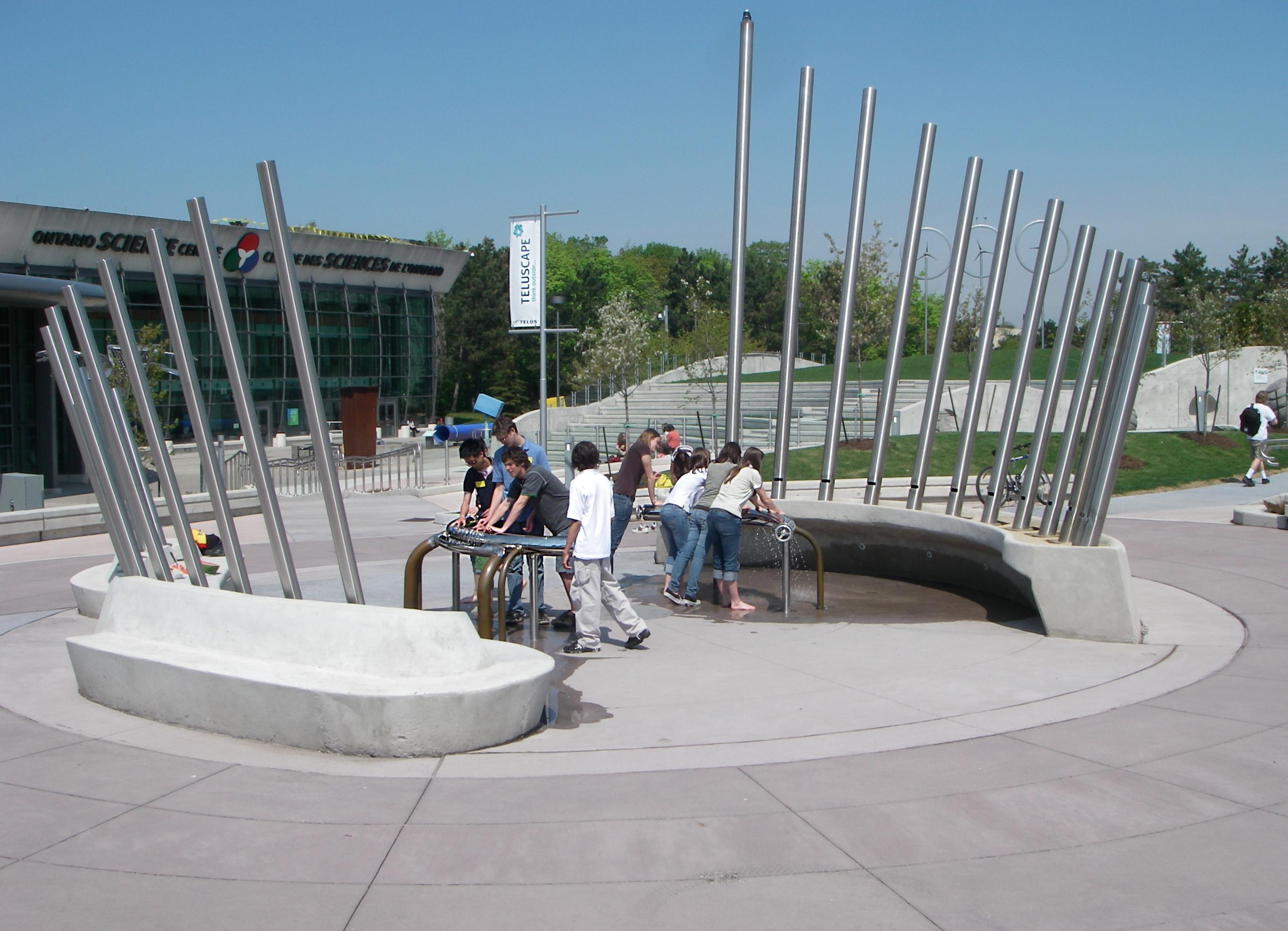
World's largest outdoor hydraulophone at the Ontario Science Centre in Toronto, Canada

Presently the world's largest hydraulophone is located in the outdoor plaza of the Ontario Science Centre, one of Canada's landmark architecture sites. It is also Toronto's only freely accessible aquatic play facility that runs 24 hours a day.

This hydraulophone is not put on display during winter months.

== Installations ==
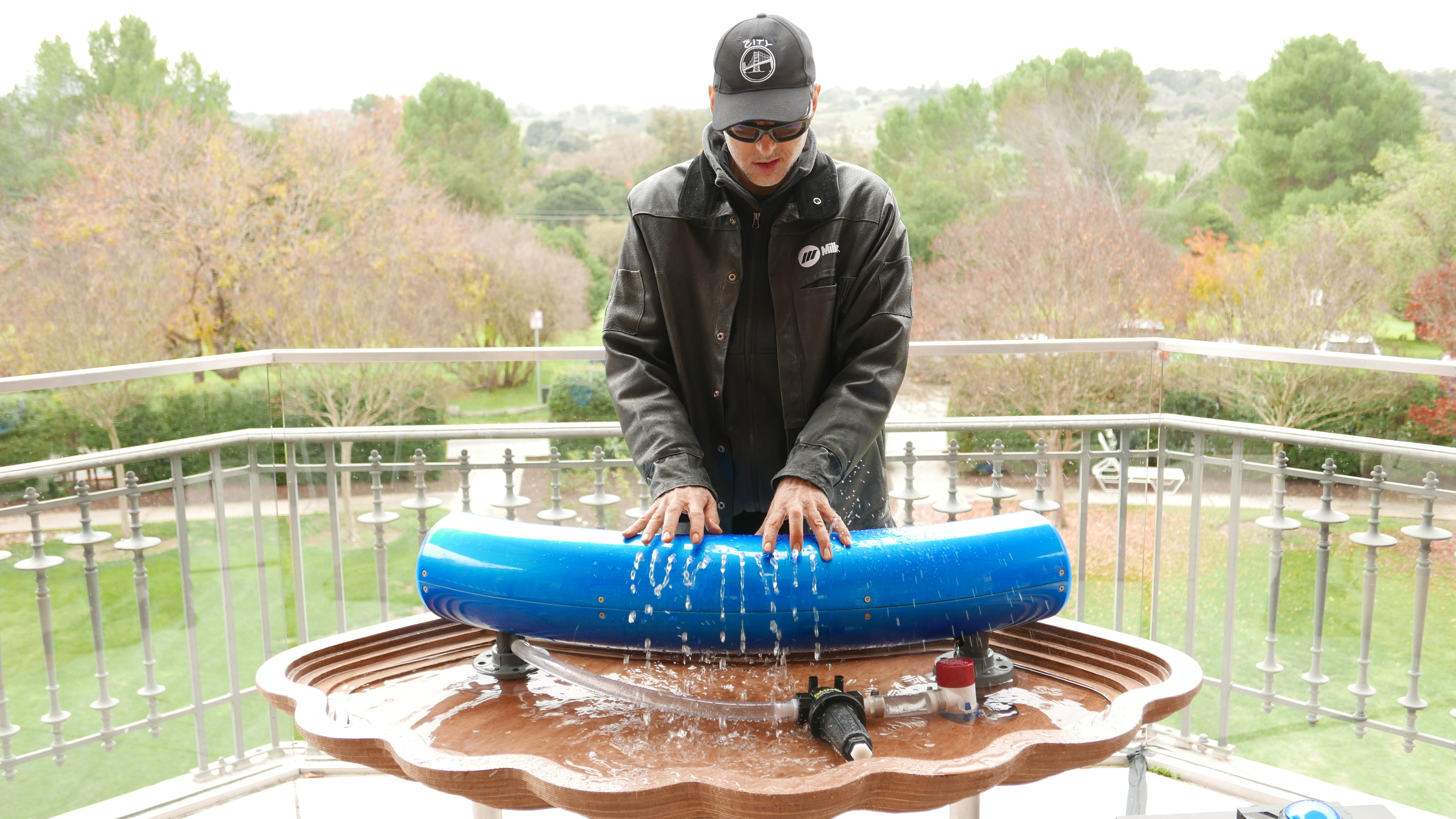
This hydraulophone is showcased at Stanford University's Center for Computer Research in Music and Acoustics (CCRMA).

Examples of hydraulophones around the world:

- Chicago Children's Museum (Chicago, USA)
- Thinkery Children's Museum (Austin, USA)
- Legoland California (Carlsbad, USA)
- Experimentarium (Copenhagen, Denmark)
- Sydney Olympic Park Aquatic Centre (Sydney, Australia)
- Baylor University (Waco, USA)
- Ontario Science Centre (Toronto, Ontario, Canada)
- African Lion Safari (Toronto, Ontario, Canada)
- University of Toronto (Toronto, Ontario, Canada)
- Splashtones Music in Toronto, Ontario, Canada, builds hydraulophones and related instruments for waterparks, attractions, musicians, and music therapy.

== See also ==
- Calliope (instrument)
- Experimental musical instrument
- Flute
- Water drum
- Water organ
- Waterphone
