= Morning Light =

Morning Light may refer to:

== Books ==
- Morning Light, a 1930 novel by Frank Bird Linderman
- Morning Light: The Islanders in the Days of Oak and Hemp, 1946 book by H. M. Tomlinson
- Morning Light, a 1976 book by French Catholic writer Jean Sulivan, winner of Prix Bretagne
- Morning Light, a 1998 book of poetry by Lee Harwood
- Morning Light, a 2008 novel by Catherine Anderson

== Music ==
- The Morning Light, an American band, or their self-titled album

=== Albums ===
- Morning Light, a 1989 album by Debbie McClendon
- Morning Light, a 1997 album by Mark Van Hoen
- Morning Light: Songs To Awaken the Dawn, a 1999 album by Steve Green
- Morning Light, a 2003 album by Ananda Project
- Morning Light, a 2005 album by St. Louis Jesuits
- Morning Light, a 2015 album by Ivory Hours
- Morning Light, a 2019 album by Dayna Manning

=== Songs ===
- "Morning Light", a song by Lou Brown
- "Morning Light", a song by Jerry Ragovoy performed by Louis Jordan
- "Morning Light", a song by Sparkadia single from their 2008 debut album Postcards
- "Morning Light", title song of a 1977 EP by Rabbitt
- "Morning Light", a song by Girls from the 2009 album Album
- "Morning Light", a song by Eskimo Joe from the 2009 album Inshalla
- "Morning Light", a song by Ida Maria from the 2008 album Fortress Round My Heart
- "Morning Light", a song by Woods from the 2016 album City Sun Eater in the River of Light
- "Morning Light (feat. Na Na)", a song by E-type from the 1998 album Last Man Standing
- "Morning Light", a theme song for the BBC TV programme Gardeners' World
- "Morning Light", a song by Phil Keaggy from the 1982 album Play thru Me
- "Morning Light", a song by Inusa Dawuda
- "Morning Light", a song by Skinny
- "Morning Light", a 2013 single by Nu:Logic
- "A Morning Light", a song by John Zorn and performed by the Gnostic Trio from the 2013 album In Lambeth
- "Morning Light", a song by Justin Timberlake and Alicia Keys from his 2018 album Man of the Woods
- "Morning Light", a song by Doja Cat from the 2018 album Amala

=== Tunes ===
- "Morning Light", a hymn tune composed by George James Webb

== Ships ==
- Morning Light (ship), a wooden sailing ship launched in 1856 and wrecked in 1889
- USS Morning Light (1853), a sailing ship acquired by the Union Navy during the American Civil War
- Morning Light, name of the training vessel in the documentary film of the same name
- SS Morning Light (1941), a cargo liner in service 1969-73

== Other uses ==
- Morning Light (film), a 2008 sailing documentary film directed by Mark Monroe and released on Walt Disney Pictures.
- Morning Light (Gruner), a 1916 painting by Australian artist Elioth Gruner
- 'Morning Light', a cultivar of the grass Miscanthus sinensis

== See also ==
- In the Morning Light (disambiguation)
- Operation Morning Light, an effort to recover radioactive material from the Russian satellite Kosmos 954
- Bewegung Morgenlicht (German for Dawn Movement or Morning Light Movement), a German militant, pretending to be a group, active in 2009–10
- Ha-Boker Or (The Morning Light), a Hebrew periodical published by Avrom Ber Gotlober
- Clipper Morning Light, a former name of the Boeing 747-121 aircraft on Pan Am Flight 103
