= Wall of Sound (disambiguation) =

The Wall of Sound is a music production formula created by Phil Spector in the 1960s.

Wall of Sound may also refer to:

== Music ==
- Wall of Sound (Grateful Dead), a 1974 concert sound system
- Wall of Sound (record label), a British label
- Wall of Sound (website), a 1990s music website
- Wall of Sound (album), by Marty Friedman, 2017
- Wall of Sound (Seattle), a record shop in Seattle, Washington
- The Wall of Sound, an album by Geva Alon, 2007
- Wall of Sound, an album by Naturally 7, 2009
- "Wall of Sound", a song by American Hi-Fi from American Hi-Fi, 2001
- "Wall of Sound", a song by Charli XCX from Wuthering Heights, 2026

== Other uses ==
- "Wall of Sound" (Lois & Clark), a television episode

== See also ==
- Wall of Soundz, a 2010 album by Brian McFadden
- Noise in music
