= Get Closer =

Get Closer may refer to:

== Albums ==
- Get Closer (Geva Alon album) (2009)
- Get Closer (Linda Ronstadt album) or the title song (1982)
- Get Closer (Seals and Crofts album) or the title song (see below) (1976)
- Get Closer (Keith Urban album) (2010)

== Songs ==
- "Get Closer" (Seals and Crofts song) (1976)
- "Get Closer", by Life in Film
- "Get Closer", by Valerie Dore (1984)
- "Get Closer", by The Last Goodnight, the B-side of the single "Pictures of You" (2007)
- "Get Closer", by Ben Westbeech
- "Get Closer", a closing theme for the television series Big Blue Marble

== Other uses ==
- Get Closer, a defunct social networking site operated by HMV

== See also ==
- "Pégate" (English: "Get Closer"), a song by Ricky Martin (2006)
- Get Close, an album by The Pretenders (1986)
- Getting Closer (disambiguation)
