= In the Morning Light =

In the Morning Light may refer to:

- In the Morning Light, a 2011 album by Geva Alon
- "In the Morning Light", a track by Yanni from the 1993 album In My Time
- "In the Morning Light", a song by Alex Schulz performed with Robin Schulz from the 2014 album Prayer
- "In the Morning Light", a song by The Left Banke from the 1968 album The Left Banke Too
- "In the Morning Light", a song by Tiger Army from the 2016 album V •••–
- "In the Morning Light", a song by Billy Strings from the 2021 album Renewal
- In the Morning Light, a 1953 book by Charles Angoff

== See also ==
- Morning Light (disambiguation)
- Im Morgenlicht (In the Morning Light), a 1907 book by Hans Paasche
