= Ma'abarot, Israel =

Kibbutz in central Israel

Ma'barot: מַעְבָּרוֹת (Hebrew); معبروت (Arabic)
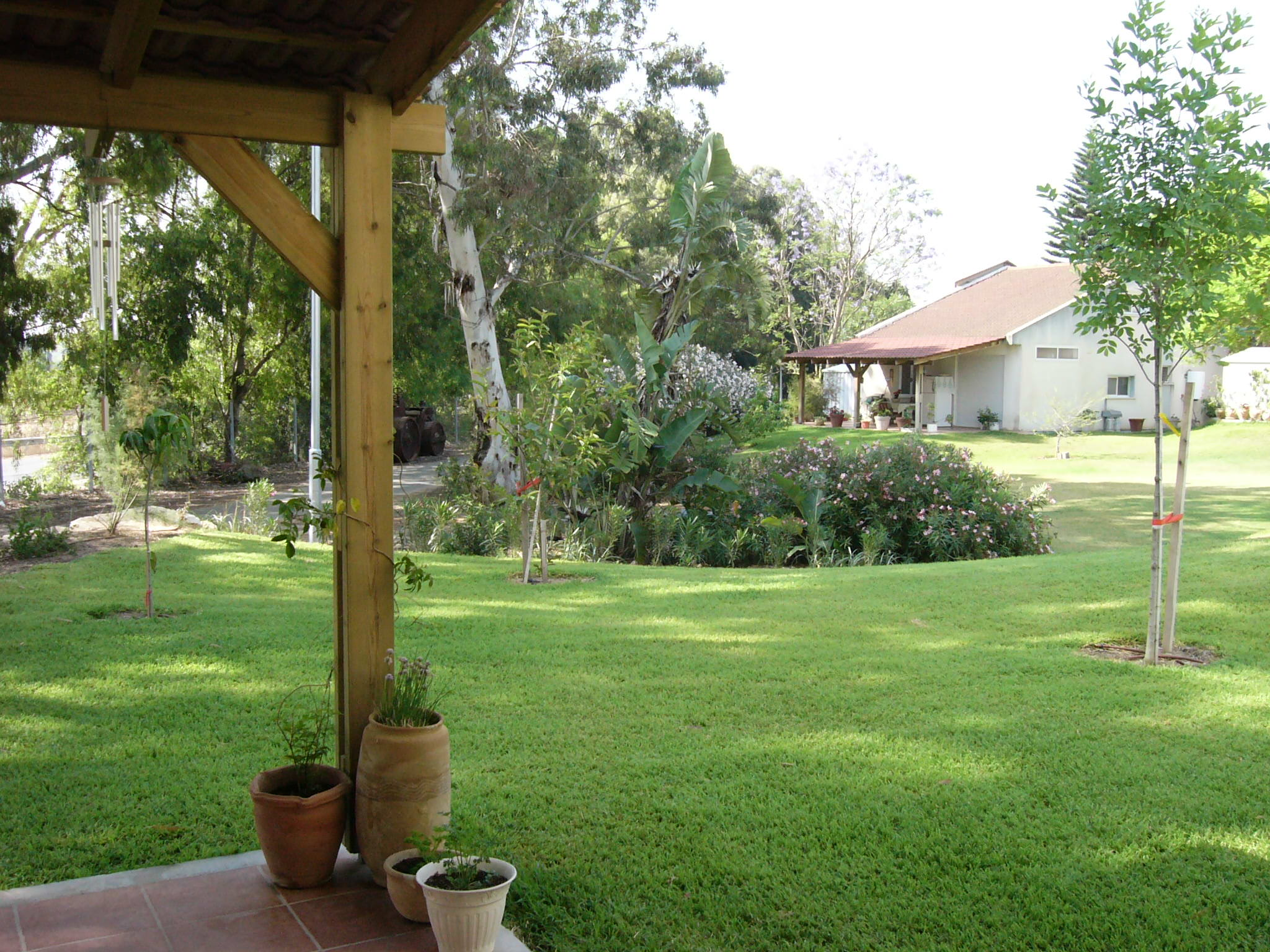

- Location within Central Israel
- Coordinates: 32°21′50″N 34°54′15″E
- Country: Israel
- District: Central
- Subdistrict: HaSharon
- Council: Hefer Valley
- Affiliation: Kibbutz Movement
- Founded: 1933
- Founder: Romanian Hashomer Hatzair members
- Population (2024): 982
- Website: www.maabarot.org.il

Ma'barot, often called Ma'abarot, is a kibbutz in Emek Hefer in central Israel, in the wider region of the Sharon Plain. Established in 1933 and located about 11 kilometers (6.8 mi) northeast of Netanya, it falls under the jurisdiction of Hefer Valley Regional Council. In 2024 it had a population of 982.

== Name ==
The Hebrew word maabarot means crossing or passage, and was given in 1933 to the newly established kibbutz due to its location near a historic crossing of the Alexander River, connecting northern and southern Palestine.

== History ==
Burial caves and artifacts from prehistoric settlements have been found on the grounds of the kibbutz.

In the Crusader period the site held a fort called Montedidier. During the Late Islamic period, a Muslim village was built around the Crusader fort.

=== Settlement group ===
Ma'barot was the third kibbutz established by members of the left-wing Hashomer Hatzair Zionist youth movement. They organized as a settlement group in Romania, and immigrated to Mandate Palestine in 1925.

Upon their arrival in Palestine, the group waited for almost nine years until land for settlement was available, in the meantime staying in various places such as Kibbutz Beth (today's Mishmar Haemek), where the foundation of Ma'abarot is considered to have taken place, Afula, Jidro, Haifa, and Hadera, and working as hired laborers in construction, agriculture, and in the dockyards of the old port of Haifa. During their time in Haifa, the group from Romania was joined by Hashomer Hatzair groups from Bulgaria and Hungary.

In 1932, a large stretch of land in Wadi Hawarith/Hefer Valley in the northern Sharon Plain near the old road from Petah Tikva to Haifa was acquired by the Jewish National Fund, of which a small part was given to the settlement group.

=== The settlement between 1933-1948 ===
Ten members established an initial presence on the land, constructing housing and farm buildings, and making a start in land amelioration, while the rest of the group continued its communal life in Hadera. In September 1933, they too moved to the site of Ma'barot, which was located in a swampy area near Nahal Alexander (Alexander River).

In 1939, Maabarot took in one of the first groups of Jewish children saved from Nazi Germany by the Youth Aliyah Organization led by Henrietta Szold. The children later joined the kibbutz. Also in 1939, a first Hashomer Hatzair group from Chile arrived in Palestine and joined Maabarot.

Over the years following the establishment of the kibbutz, its membership was augmented by additional Hashomer Hatzair groups from Germany (of which most members were Russian) and Chile.

Near Maabarot, there was a village inhabited by Bedouin of the Hawarith tribe. Just before the 1948 Palestine war, they were evacuated "for reasons unknown" to the people of Maabarot by the British authorities, who used army vehicles for the purpose. Before departing, the villagers sent a committee to the liaison officer or mukhtar of Maabarot and handed over their house keys for safekeeping.

=== Further development ===
After the arrival of the youth group of 1939, nine more youth groups were placed in the kibbutz's own education system until 1963, with some of the youths choosing to remain as members. After ceasing this activity for 22 years, in 1985, at a time where it gave up keeping its own children in children's houses and moved to placing them with their families, Maabarot began again to accept youth groups, this time originating from Israel. It took in four such groups until 2012. Them, along with children born in Maabarot, became the main source of population growth for the kibbutz.

== Collective character ==
In 2017, in contrast to most other kibbutzim, which have embraced privatization and have done away with many of the communal aspects that historically characterized kibbutz life, Ma'barot remains heavily collectivized. There are no differential wages, with all members living off a budget that does not include any special compensation for work, the communal dining hall still operates, and over thirty committees regulate almost every aspect of life on the kibbutz.

== Economy ==
Typical for a kibbutz, agriculture used to be the basis of Maabarot's economy, but its contribution to the total income has greatly fallen, reaching less than 10% by 2012, with industry becoming the main source of income.

=== Agriculture ===
Ma'barot farms approximately 3,000 dunams (3 km^{2}) of land. Cotton is the major cash crop, and other branches include subtropical orchards of avocado, lychee and dragon fruit trees, fish-breeding ponds for ornamental fishes and a dairy farm. The latter was held, as of 2017, together with Kibbutz Ha'ogen.

=== Industry ===
As of 2012, the kibbutz was operating two pharmaceutical factories and one metal factory:

- "TRIMA", which produces medical supplies. As of 2017, it was held in partnership with the Israeli company Unipharm.
- "Ma'abarot Products", which manufactures veterinary medical supplies and feed additives for livestock, among them "BONZO" dog food and "LaCat" cat food.
- "Metal Ma'barot", which designs and manufactures industrial machinery for use in factories, with John Deere being one of its customers.

In addition, Ma'barot runs a drying plant that dehydrates a variety of foods. Foremost among these is Materna, a leading Israeli brand of infant formula. In 2017, the kibbutz sold its remaining 49% share in Materna to Osem-Nestle for $156 million.

== Culture ==
In 1944, Nissim Nissimov, a composer with ties to the Labor movement organized a musical show inspired by the Song of Songs. In 1955, the French cellist Paul Tortelier, impressed by the ideals of the kibbutzim, spent a year at Ma'barot with his family. He composed "Israeli Symphony" based on his experiences.

== Gallery ==
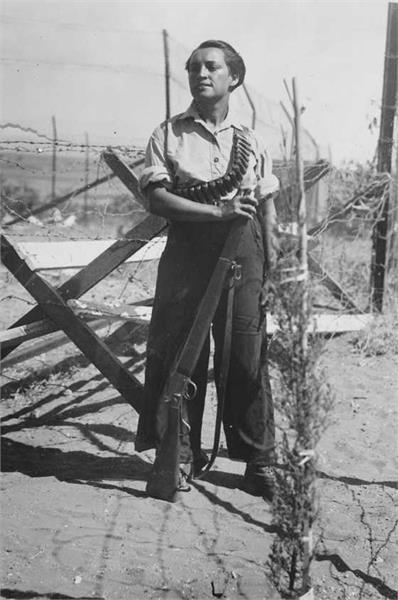
A member of Kibbutz Ma'barot on guard duty, 1936

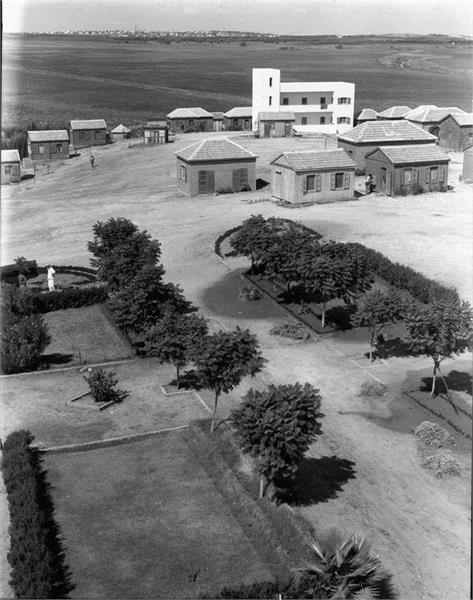
Ma’abarot 1937

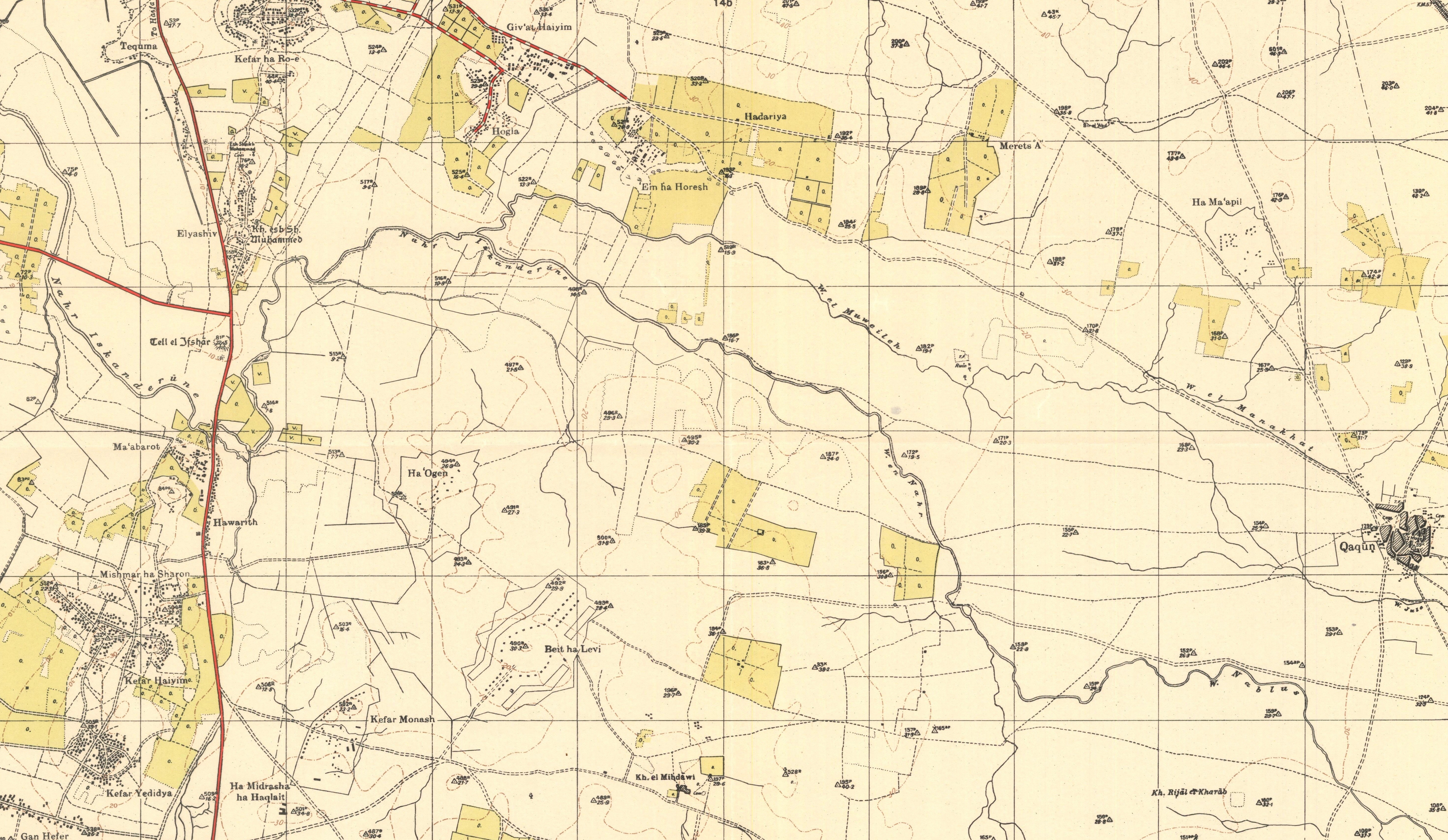
Ma'abarot 1939, 1:20,000; see western section

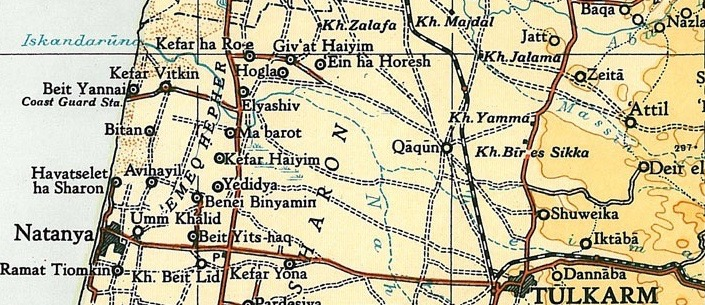
Ma'abarot (Ma'barot) 1945, 1:250,000; see western section, "Emeq Hepher"

== Notable people ==
- Geva Alon, musician
- Shimon Dar, Archaeologist
