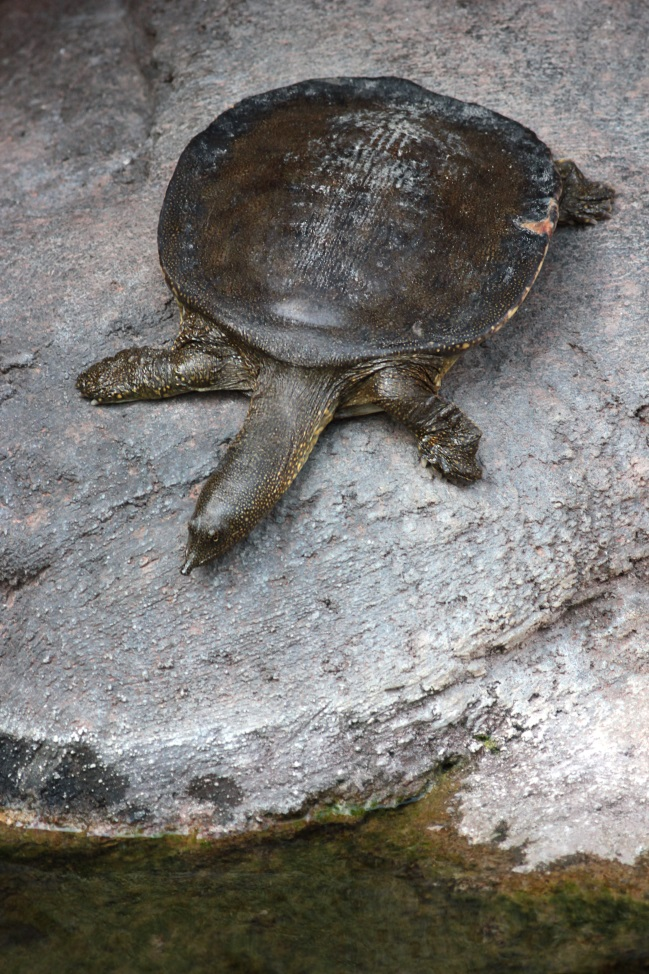

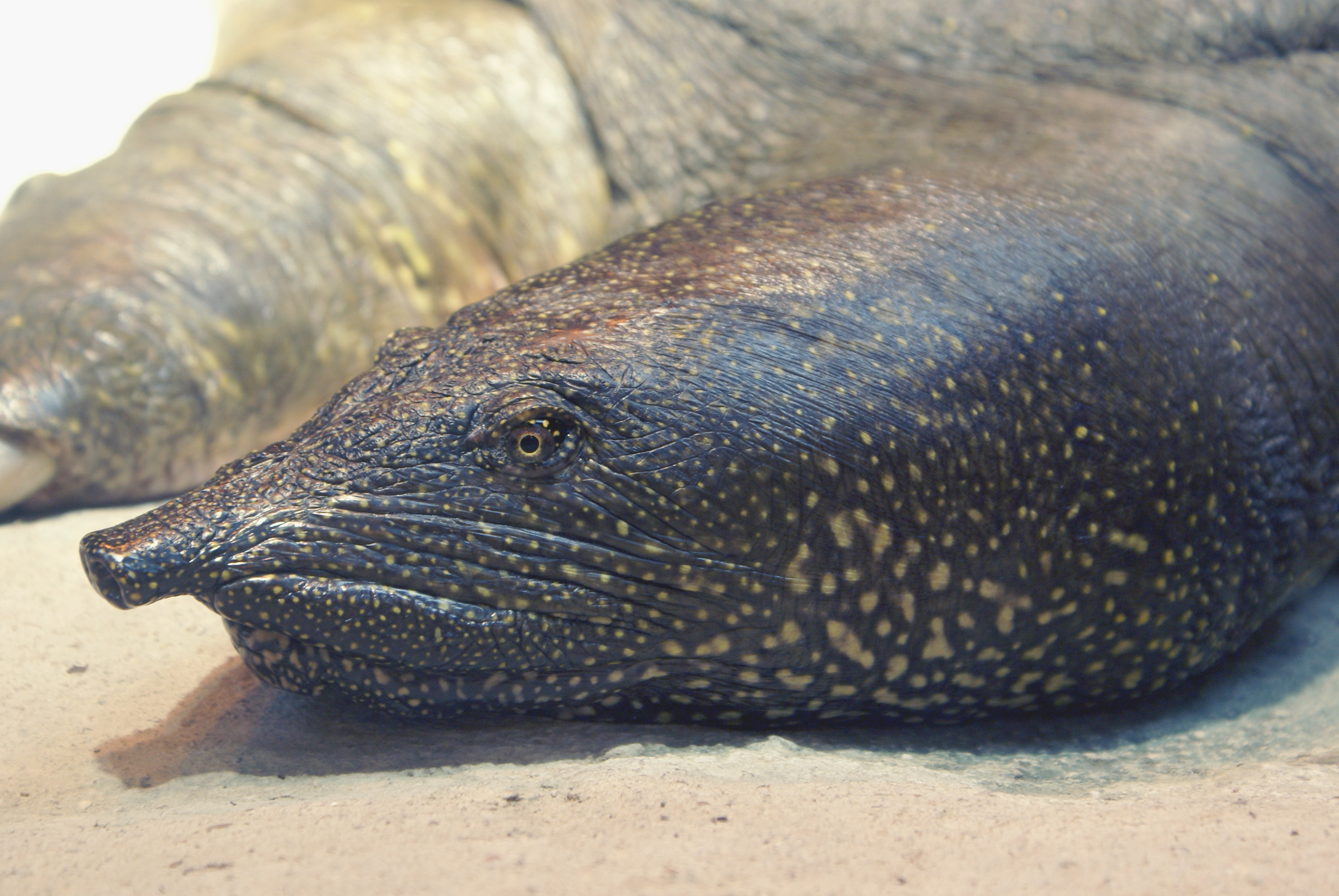

Conservation status
- Vulnerable (IUCN 3.1)
- CITES Appendix II

Scientific classification
- Kingdom: Animalia
- Phylum: Chordata
- Class: Reptilia
- Order: Testudines
- Suborder: Cryptodira
- Family: Trionychidae
- Genus: Trionyx
- Species: T. triunguis

Binomial name
- Trionyx triunguis (Forsskål, 1775)

Synonyms
- List: Testudo triunguis Forsskål, 1775; Testudo striata Suckow, 1798; Trionyx egyptiacus Geoffroy Saint-Hilaire, 1809; Trionyx aegyptiacus Geoffroy Saint-Hilaire, 1809; Amyda triunguis Oken, 1816; Aspidonectes aegyptiacus Wagler, 1830; Trionyx niloticus Gray, 1831; Gymnopodus aegyptiacus Duméril & Bibron, 1835; Trionyx (Pelodiscus) labiatus Fitzinger, 1835; Tyrse nilotica Gray, 1844; Trionyx mortoni Hallowell, 1844; Aspidonectes aspilus Cope, 1860; Fordia africana Gray, 1869; Trionyx triunguis Peters, 1876; Gymnopus aspilus Rochebrune, 1884; Gymnopus aegyptiacus Boulenger, 1889; Pelodiscus triunguis Baur, 1893; Aspidonectes triunguis Hay, 1904; Pelodiscus labiatus Hay, 1904; Tyrse triunguis Hay, 1904; Trionyx triunguis rudolfianus Deraniyagala, 1948; Amyda triunguis rudolfianus Mertens & Wermuth, 1955; Amyda triunguis triunguis Mertens & Wermuth, 1955; Trionyx aegypticus Młynarski, 1969 (ex errore); Trionyx triungus Gosławski & Hryniewicz, 1993 (ex errore); Trionix triunguis Richard, 1999

= African softshell turtle =

Species of turtle

The African softshell turtle, or Nile softshell turtle (Trionyx triunguis), is a large species of softshell turtle from freshwater and brackish-water habitats in Africa (larger parts of Eastern, Northeastern, Western and Middle Africa) and the Near East (Israel, Lebanon, Syria and Turkey). It is the only extant species in the genus Trionyx; historically, despite other species having been formerly placed in this genus as well, they have all been reclassified to other genera.

Despite the common name of "African softshell turtle", Trionyx triunguis is not the sole species (or genus) of softshell turtle found in Africa—the genera Cyclanorbis and Cycloderma are African—nor is it solely found on that continent, alone.

== Description ==
T. triunguis is a very large species of softshell turtle, with sizes ranging from 85 to 94 cm, with a weight of 40 kg, and an unconfirmed max size of 120 cm. They are omnivorous in their diet, consuming not only small fish, frogs, tadpoles and crustaceans, but also floating palm seeds and fallen leaves, and some aquatic vegetation.

== Conservation ==
According to the IUCN, the species is vulnerable, and has experienced serious decline.

The Mediterranean subpopulation of the Nile soft-shelled turtle was listed by the IUCN as critically endangered. They are under threat because of large use of their habitats with fishing activities, and irrigation, destruction of their nesting places, destruction caused by boats, and water pollution.

T. triunguis was listed on CITES's Appendix II in 2016; the population in Ghana was also included in CITES's Appendix III from 1976 to 2007. CITES is a multilateral treaty to protect endangered plants and animals from the threats of international trade. T. triunguis hatchlings are occasionally sold as pets, with export to Japan and Europe recorded.

== Religion ==
In Ancient Egyptian religion the African softshell turtle seems to have been viewed as a symbol of evil animal and opponent of Ra.

== Gallery ==
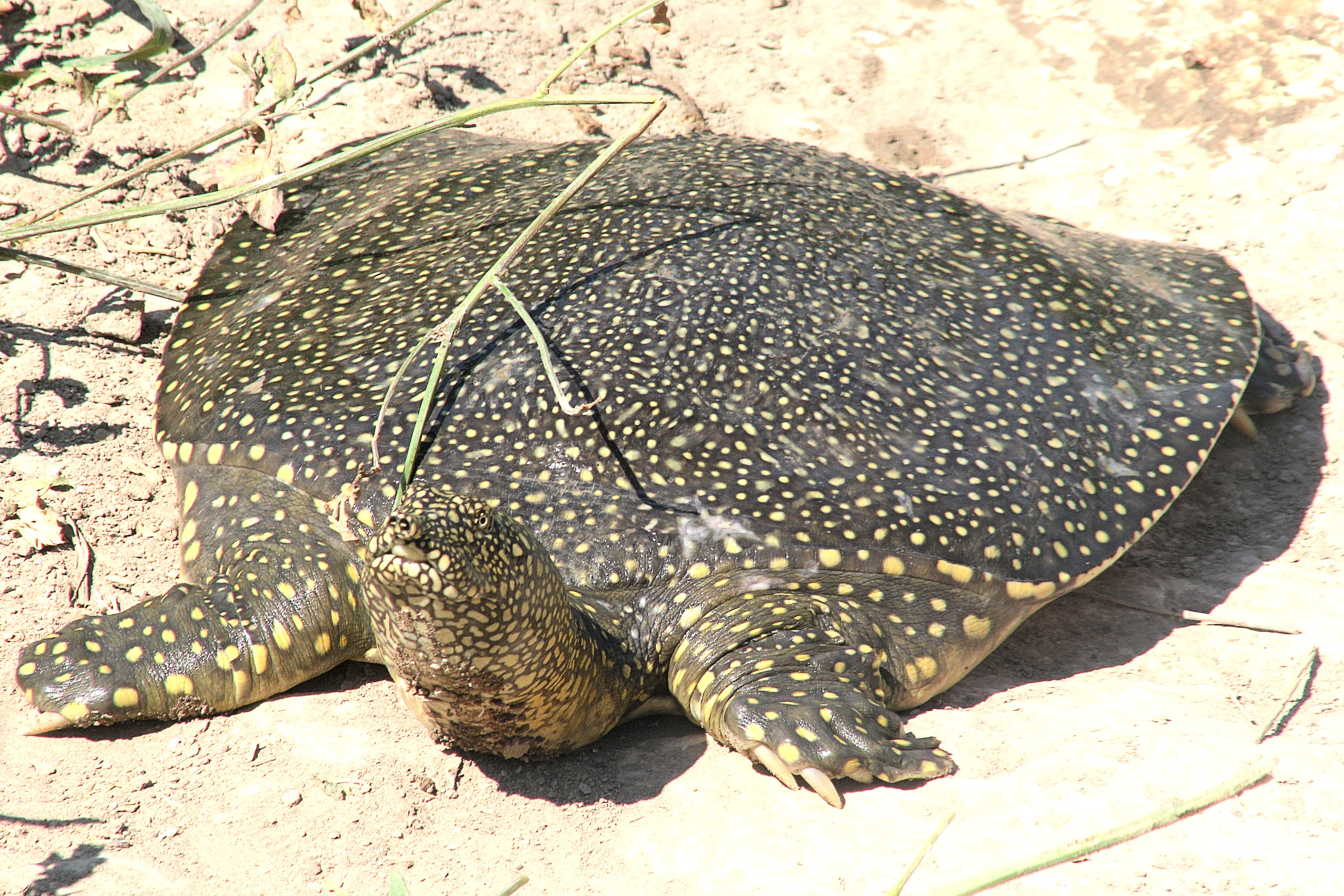
African softshell turtle at Nahal Alexander, Israel

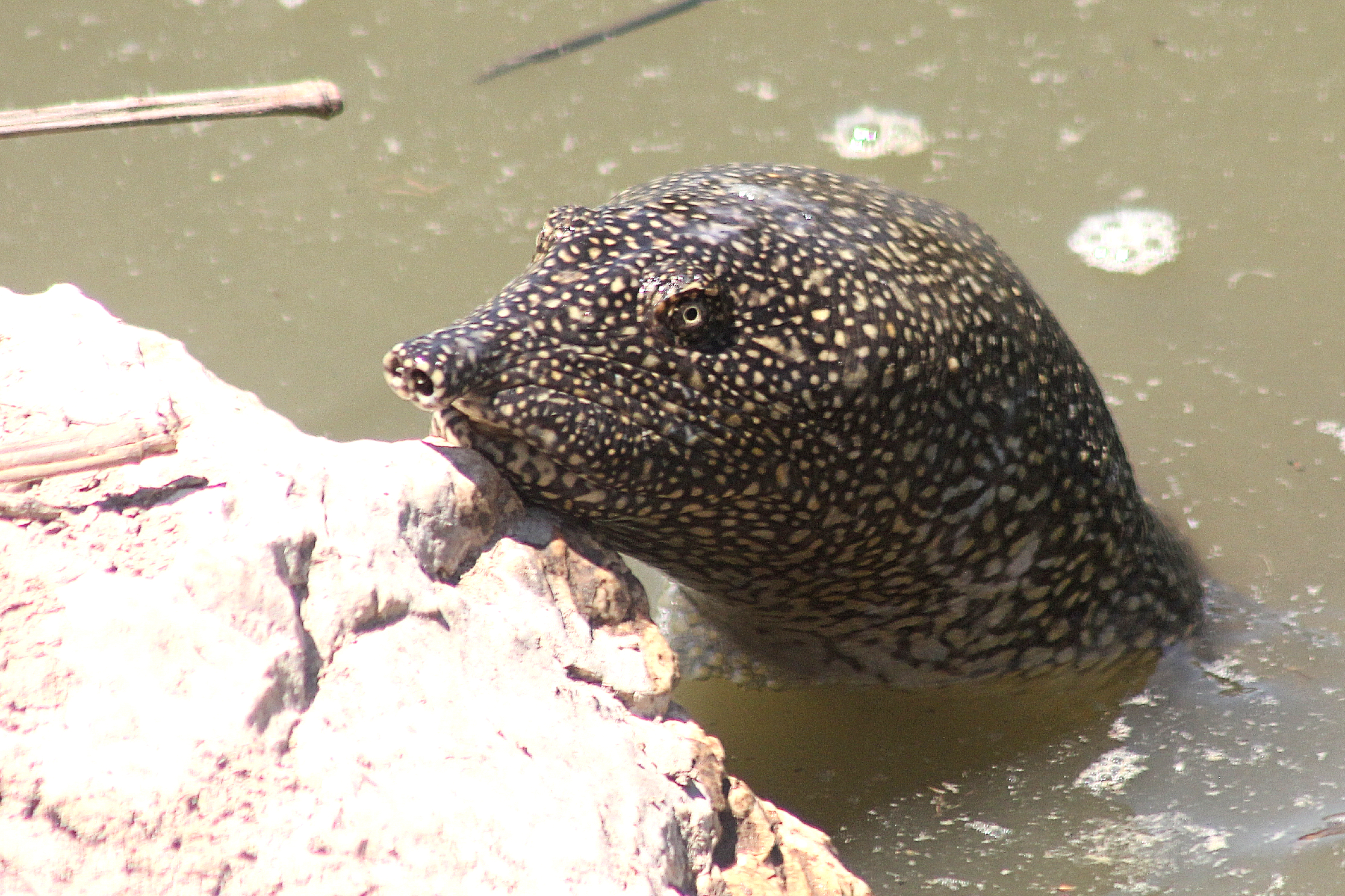
Head of African softshell turtle at Nahal Alexander, Israel

African softshell turtle with red-eared sliders at Nahal Alexander, Israel

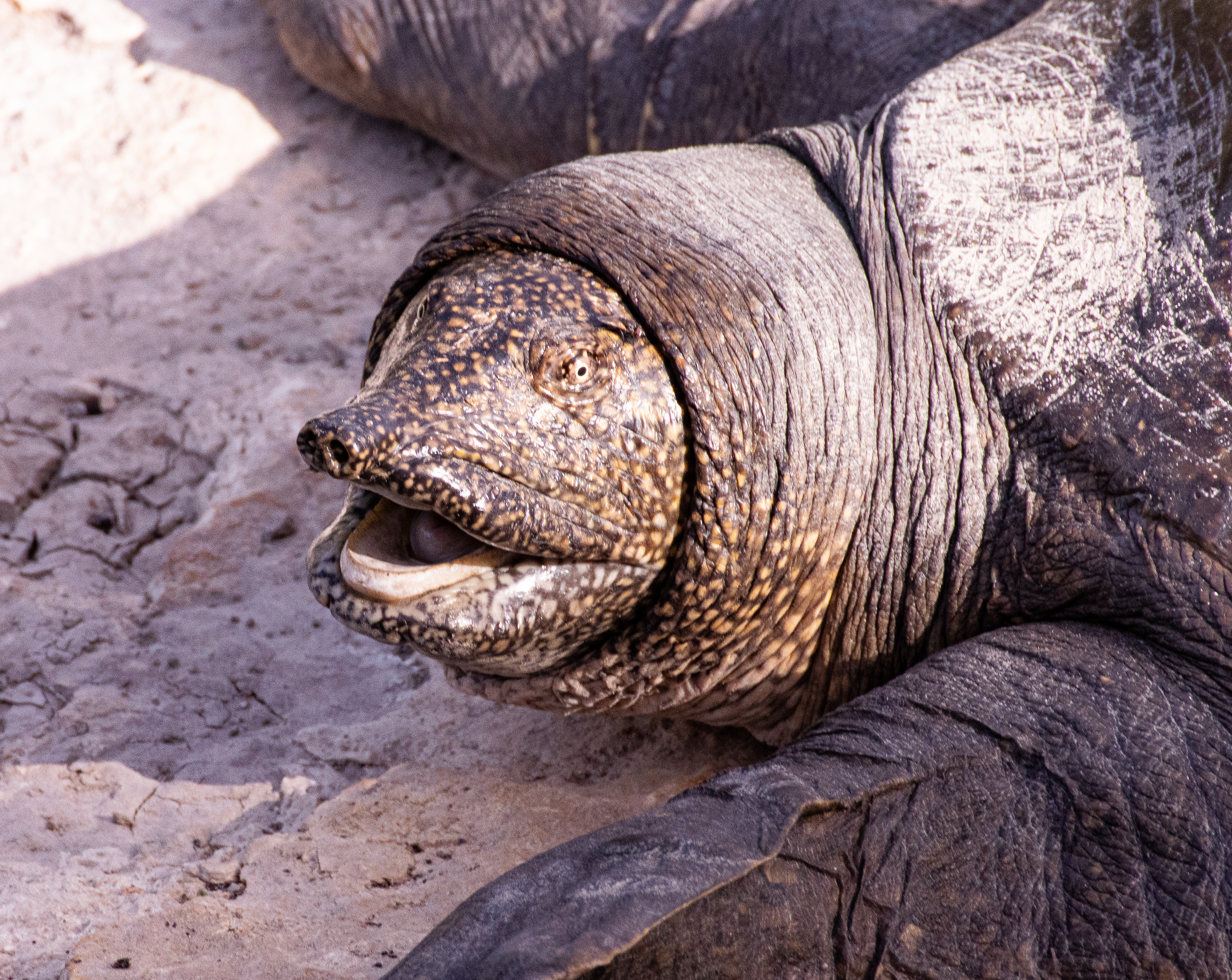
Head and neck of African softshell turtle at Nahal Alexander, Israel

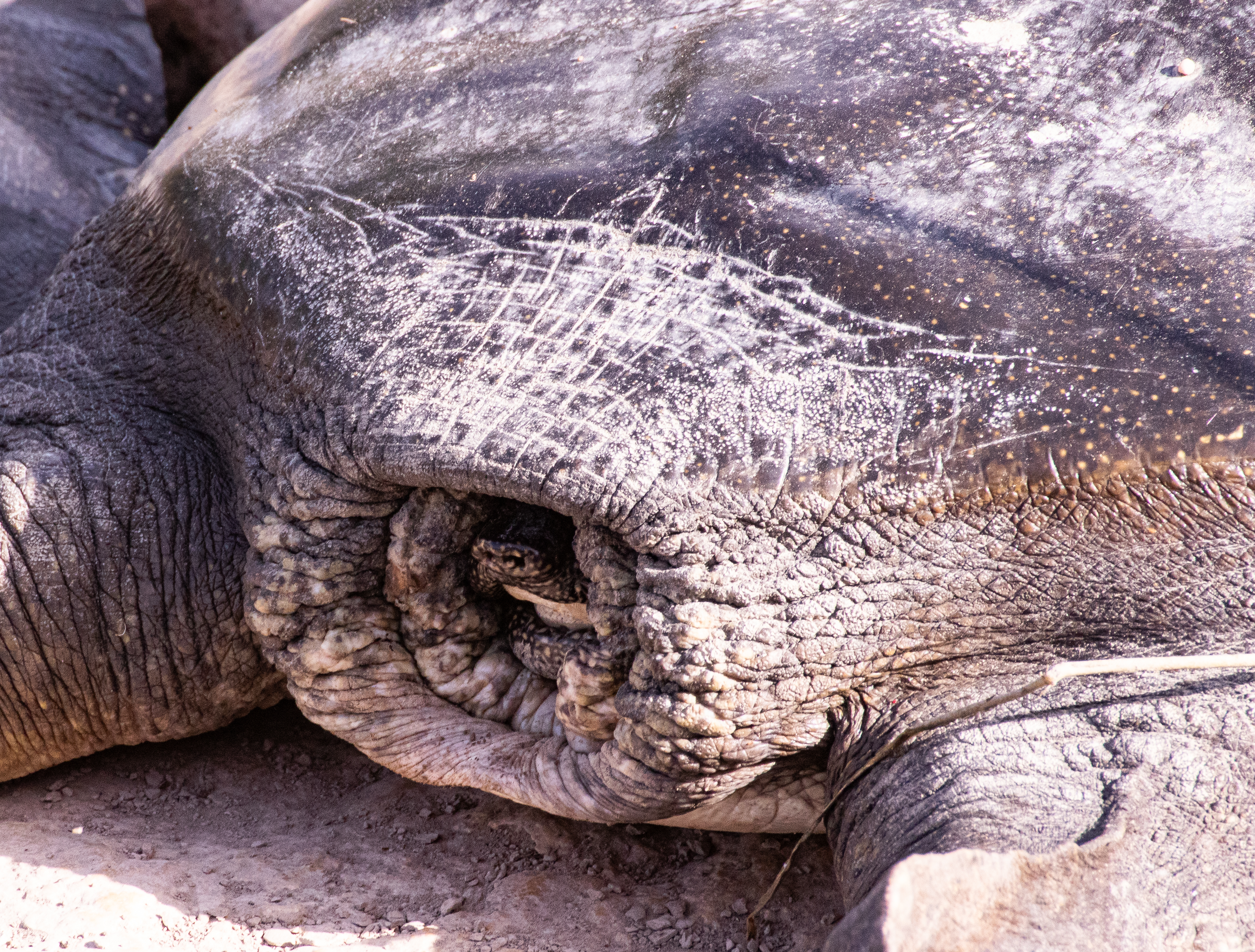
Head and neck (retracted) of African softshell turtle at Nahal Alexander, Israel

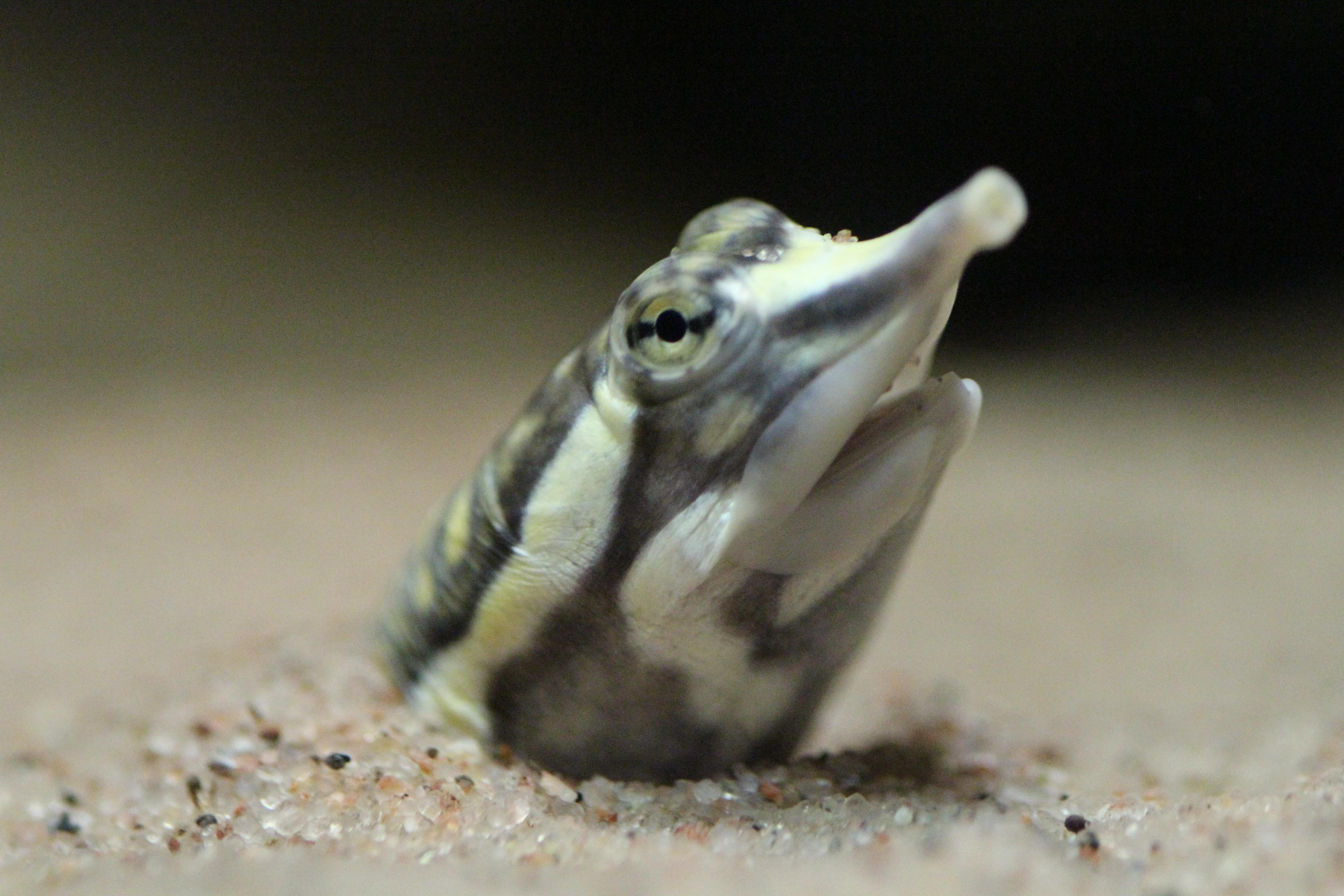
Juvenile underwater, buried under sand
