= Underground (Phil Keaggy album) =

Studio album by Phil Keaggy
- Released: 1983
- Recorded: Autumn 1982 – spring 1983
- Studio: Phil's home basement (Leawood, Kansas); Weddington Studios (North Hollywood, California)
- Genre: Rock; Pop
- Length: 44:58 (LP release); 50:19 (CD re-release)
- Label: Nissi
- Producer: Phil Keaggy

Phil Keaggy chronology
Play thru Me (1982)	Underground (1983)	Getting Closer! (1985)

2000 re-release cover art

Underground is an album by guitarist Phil Keaggy, released in 1983, on Nissi Records. It is a collection of demo tracks recorded by Keaggy in his home studio.

The album was re-released in 2000 on CD by the Phil Keaggy Club, and features a different track order.

== Track listing ==
All songs written by Phil Keaggy.

=== 1983 LP and cassette release ===
Side one

1. "What a Love" - 3:56
2. "The Ransom" [instrumental] - 3:47
3. "Deadline" - 3:36
4. "Think About It" - 3:36
5. "One in a Million" - 4:36
6. "I Know Someone" - 3:41
7. "A Glorious Sunset" (cassette only) - 4:08

Side two

1. "The Two of You" - 4:56
2. "Paid in Full" [instrumental] - 4:20
3. "What You Are Inside" - 3:35
4. "Follow Me On" [instrumental] - 3:24
5. "The Survivor" - 5:12
6. "When I Say I Love You" (cassette only) - 3:17

=== 2000 CD re-release ===
1. "Paid in Full" - 4:20
2. "I Know Someone" - 3:48
3. "Deadline" - 3:33
4. "What a Love" - 3:45
5. "The Two of You" - 5:01
6. "One in a Million" - 4:33
7. "The Ransom" - 3:50
8. "What You Are Inside" - 3:35
9. "A Glorious Sunset" - 4:02
10. "Follow Me On" - 3:22
11. "Think About It" - 3:46
12. "When I Say I Love You" - 3:11
13. "The Survivor" - 5:16

== Personnel ==
Credits taken from CD re-release.

- Phil Keaggy – all instruments, vocals (2–6, 8, 9, 11–13)
- Bernadette Keaggy – additional vocals (11)

== Production ==
- Phil Keaggy – producer, arrangements, tracking engineer, final mix engineer, sleeve notes
- Bob Cotton – final mix engineer, management
- Wally Grant – additional overdub engineer
- Mike Ross – additional overdub engineer
- Future Disc (Hollywood, California) – mastering location
- Judith Cotton – cover coordinator
- B. Charlyne Hinesley – cover coordinator
- Stan Evenson Design, Inc. – art direction, design
- The Design Oasis – photography
