= Montauban-de-Bretagne =

Montauban-de-Bretagne Montauban (Gallo) Menezalban (Breton)
- Commune
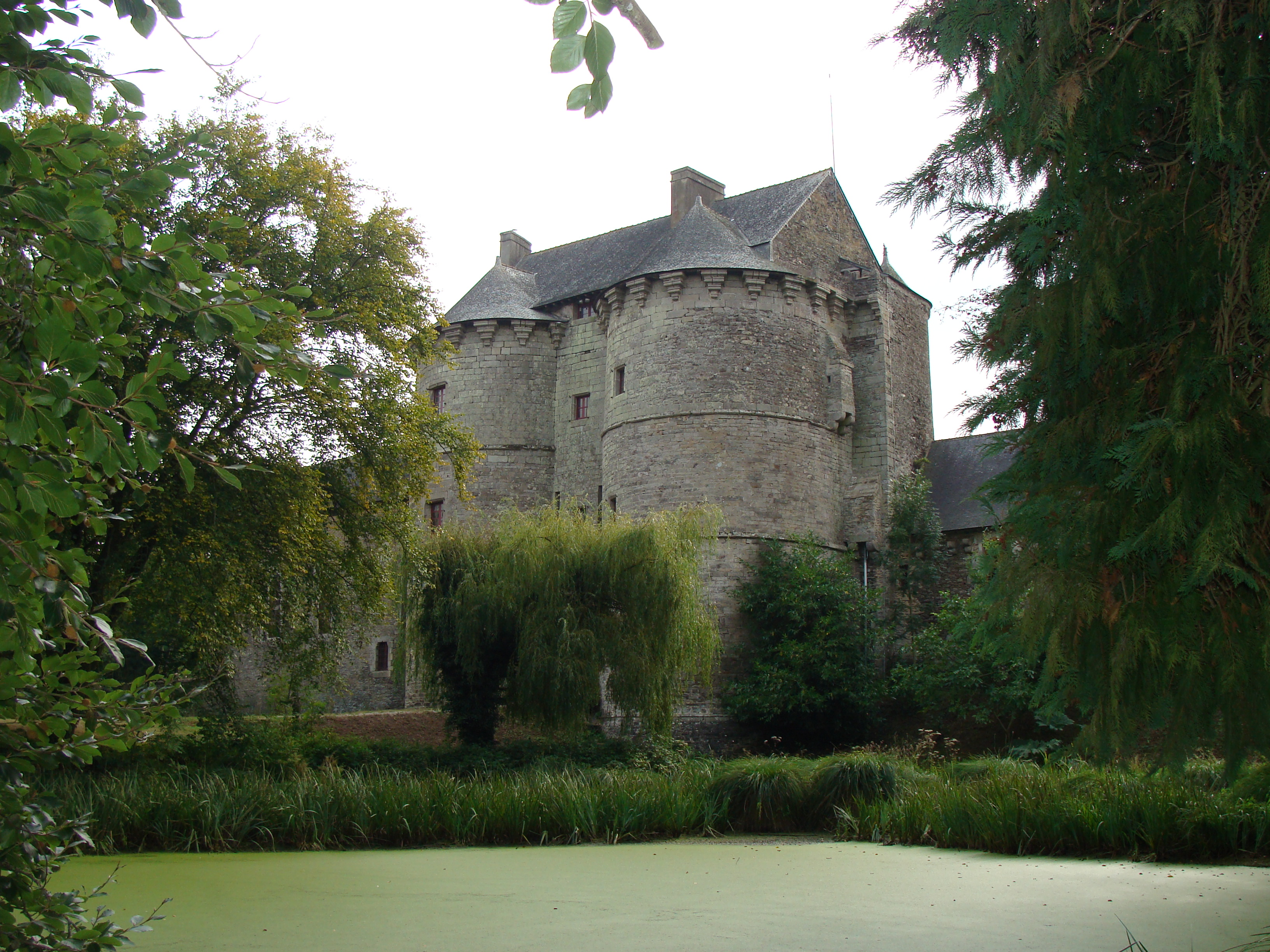
- Chateau

- Coat of arms
- Location of Montauban-de-Bretagne
- Location within France Location within Brittany
- Coordinates: 48°12′00″N 2°02′48″W
- Country: France
- Region: Brittany
- Department: Ille-et-Vilaine
- Arrondissement: Rennes
- Canton: Montauban-de-Bretagne
- Intercommunality: Saint-Méen Montauban

Government
  - Mayor (2020–2026): Serge Jalu
- Area^{1}: 45.42 km^{2} (17.54 sq mi)
- Highest elevation: 117 m (384 ft)
- Lowest elevation: 42 m (138 ft)
- Population (2023): 6,597
  - Density: 145.2/km^{2} (376.2/sq mi)
- Time zone: UTC+01:00 (CET)
  - Summer (DST): UTC+02:00 (CEST)
- INSEE/Postal code: 35184 /35360
- ^{1} French Land Register data, which excludes lakes, ponds, glaciers > 1 km^{2} (0.386 sq mi or 247 acres) and river estuaries.

Montauban-de-Bretagne (French pronunciation: [mɔ̃tobɑ̃ də bʁətaɲ], literally Montauban of Brittany; Breton: Menezalban, Gallo: Montauban) is a commune in the Ille-et-Vilaine department in Brittany in northwestern France. On 1 January 2019, the former commune Saint-M'Hervon was merged into Montauban-de-Bretagne. The writer Jean Sulivan (1913–1980) was born in Montauban.

Previously known as Montauban, the name was changed to Montauban-de-Bretagne in 1995.

== Population ==
Inhabitants of Montauban-de-Bretagne are called Montalbanais in French. Population data refer to the commune in its geography as of January 2025.

Historical population
Year	Pop.	±% p.a.
1968	3,182	—
1975	3,462	+1.21%
1982	3,933	+1.84%
1990	4,123	+0.59%
1999	4,359	+0.62%
2007	4,823	+1.27%
2012	5,481	+2.59%
2017	5,840	+1.28%
2023	6,597	+2.05%
Source: INSEE

== See also ==
- Communes of the Ille-et-Vilaine department
