= Jean Lavoué =

French author, poet, and essayist (1955–2024)

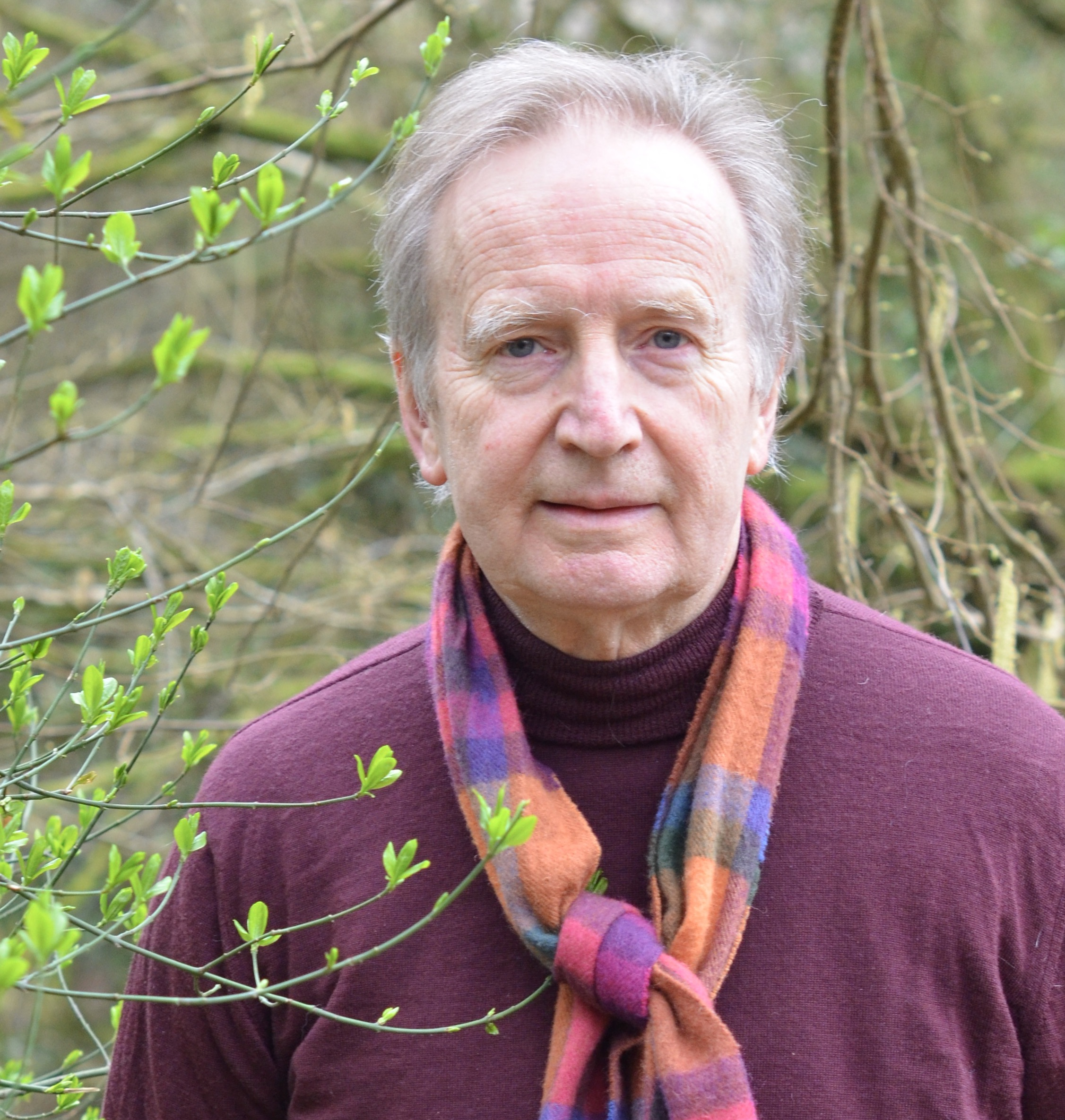
- Lavoué in 2021
- Born: 25 March 1955; La Fresnais, France
- Died: 8 May 2024 (aged 69)
- Occupations: Author; Poet; Essayist

Jean Lavoué (25 March 1955 – 8 May 2024) was a French author, poet and essayist.

== Biography ==
Born on 25 March 1955 in La Fresnais, Lavoué was the author of approximately forty works, primarily on literature and spirituality. In 2017, he established a publishing house called L’enfance des arbres. In 2019, he received the Prix de poésie Yves Cosson, awarded by the Académie littéraire de Bretagne et des Pays de la Loire. His books were inspired by the likes of Jean Sulivan and René Guy Cadou. In 2021, he published a book titled Voix de Bretagne, Le chant des pauvres, which combined the common traits of all the authors who inspired him.

Jean Lavoué died on 8 May 2024, at the age of 69.

== Publications ==
=== Prose ===
- Jean Sulivan, je vous écris (2000)
- Perros, Bretagne fraternelle (2004)
- Dans l'éclat de l'instant (2005)
- Le Christ aux silences (2007)
- Jean Sulivan, la voie nue de l'intériorité (2011)
- La Prophétie de Féli, L'évangile social de Félicité de Lamennais (2012)
- Christ Blues, stèles pour Xavier Grall (2012)
- La voie libre de l'intériorité (2012)
- L’Évangile en liberté (2013)
- La vie comme une caresse (2016)
- René Guy Cadou la fraternité au cœur (2019)
- Des clairières en attente, Un chemin avec Jean Sulivan (2021)
- Voix de Bretagne, Le chant des pauvres (2021)
- L'allegro spirituel (2022)
- Le Poème à venir, Pour une spiritualité des lisières (2022)

=== Essays ===
- Éduquer avec les parents. L'action éducative en milieu ouvert : une pédagogie pour la parentalité ? (2000)
- La Demande de justice en protection de l'enfance (2004)
- Transformer l’action sociale avec les associations (2013)

=== Books ===
- Pourquoi les morts (2009)
- Cela silencieux (2012)
- Les premiers mots (2012)
- Seul au loin, Regard neuf, Si je viens, Les pas secrets, Près de toi (2012)
- Pour écrire (2012)
- Dans ce jardin peut-être (2012)
- Quelques écrits de l'arbre (2012)
- Avant les mots (2023)

=== Poetry ===
- Soleil des grèves (1996)
- Les Silences du passant (1997)
- La Porte des jours (1998)
- L'Offrande des sables (1999)
- L'Errance au soleil (2002)
- Pourquoi les morts (2002)
- Pèlerin du seuil (2005)
- Du ciel sous l'écorce (2007)
- Le Cœur réel (2008)
- L'Incandescence seule (2008)
- Ce rien qui nous éclaire (2017)
- Chant ensemencé (2018)
- Nous sommes d'une source (2018)
- Levain de ma joie (2018)
- Fraternité des lisières (2018)
- Que serions-nous sans nos silences (2019)
- Des ailes pour l'Ukraine (2022)
- Écrits de l'arbre dans le soleil (2023)
- Passio Vegetalis (2023)
