= Days of Hunger =

Studio album by Geva Alon
- Released: 22 March 2006
- Genre: Alternative rock, indie rock, folk rock, indie folk, blues rock, country rock, acoustic, psychedelic folk
- Length: 54:00
- Label: Blue Sun Music

Geva Alon chronology
Days of Hunger (2006)	The Wall of Sound (2007)

Days of Hunger is the debut studio album by Israeli alternative folk artist Geva Alon, released on 22 March 2006.

It is Alon's first album as a solo artist, and features a much more acoustic sound, with influences ranging from folk and indie rock to blues, country and psychedelic rock, with a big touch of Americana.

== Track listing ==
No.	Title	Length
1.	"Days of Hunger"	3:40
2.	"On This Birthday"	4:18
3.	"And Once Again"	3:29
4.	"Beginning"	4:39
5.	"Come On Rider"	2:34
6.	"That Grassy Hill of Mine"	4:19
7.	"Turning Turning"	3:56
8.	"Wintercold"	4:22
9.	"Sunny Day"	2:18
10.	"A Girl Like You"	4:53
11.	"Learn"	3:20
12.	"Long Summer Night"	2:17
13.	"Relaxation"	5:46
14.	"A Love to Throw"	4:12

== Personnel ==
- Geva Alon - lead vocals, guitar
- Sagi Eiland - guitar, backing vocals
- Elran Dekel - bass, backing vocals
- Yaara Eilon - keyboards, backing vocals
- Gil Reichental - drums, percussion
- Matan Ashkenazy - accordion, percussion, backing vocals
- Mika Sade - backing vocals
