= Wadi al-Hawarith =

Wadi al-Hawarith وادي الحوارث
- Village
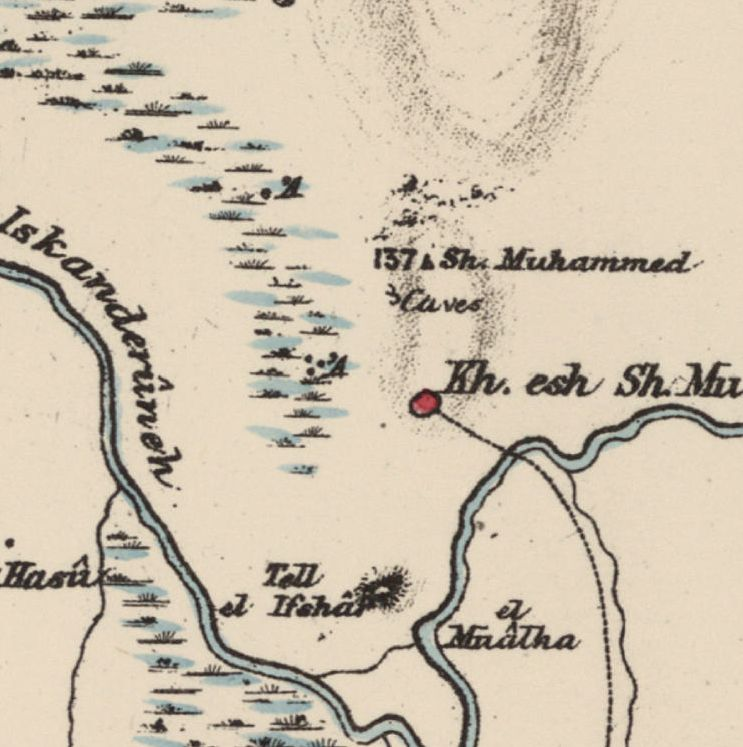
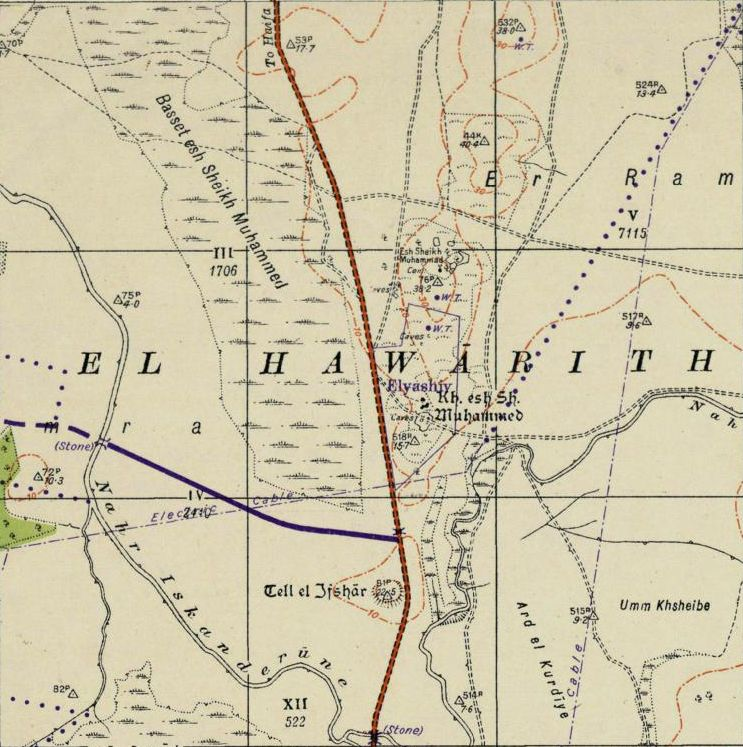
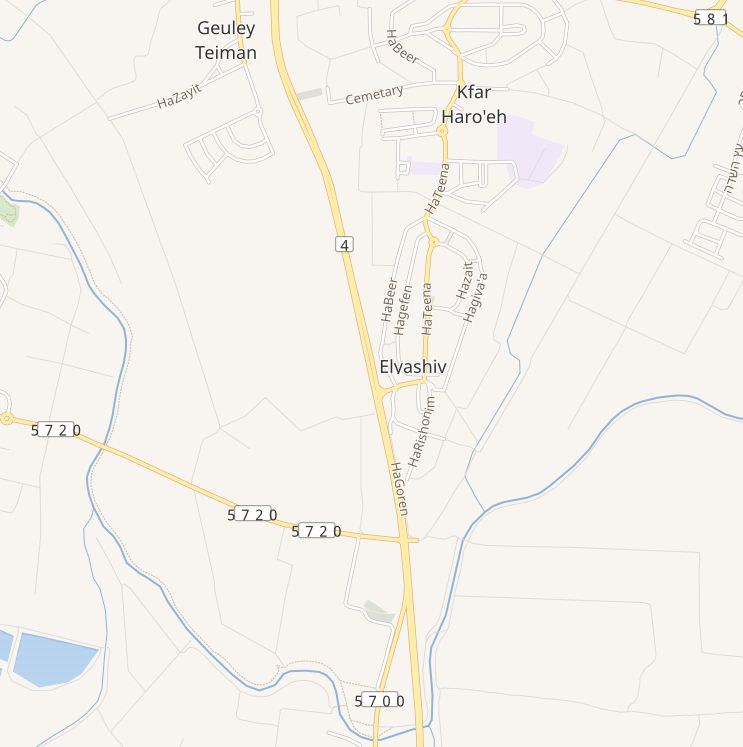
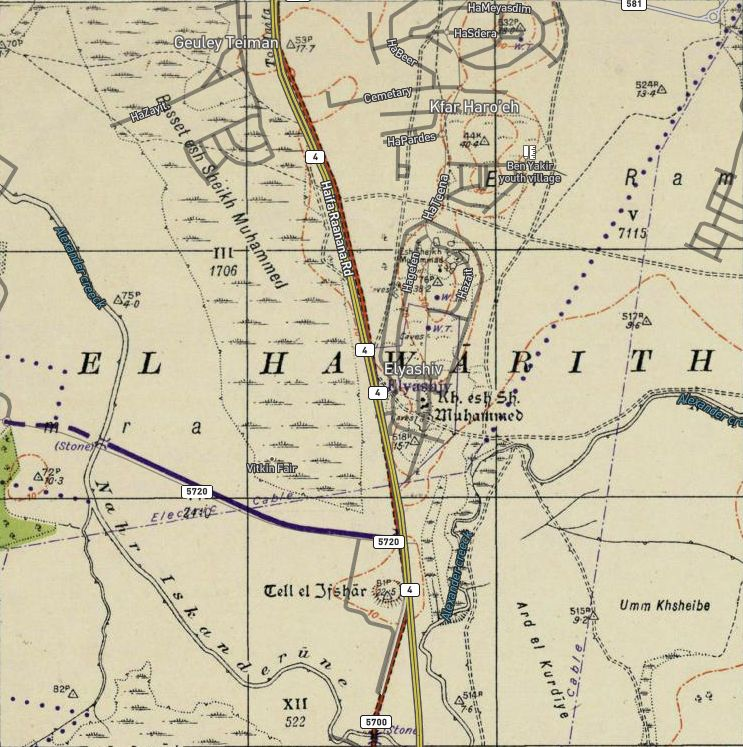
- 1870s map 1940s map modern map 1940s with modern overlay map A series of historical maps of the area around Wadi al-Hawarith (click the buttons)

- Location within Mandatory Palestine
- Coordinates: 32.39°N 34.90°E
- Palestine grid: 139/201 (North) 139/200 (South)
- Geopolitical entity: Mandatory Palestine
- Subdistrict: Tulkarm
- Date of depopulation: March 15, 1948

Area
  - Total: 7,106 dunams (7.106 km^{2}; 2.744 sq mi)

Population (1945)
  - Total: 1,330
- Cause(s) of depopulation: Military assault by Yishuv forces
- Secondary cause: Fear of being caught up in the fighting
- Current Localities: Kfar Haroeh, Geulei Teiman

Wadi al-Hawarith (Arabic: وادي الحوارث) was a Palestinian bedouin village in the Tulkarm Subdistrict. It was ethnically cleansed at the outbreak of the 1948 Arab–Israeli War on March 15, 1948, following the 1947–48 Civil War in Mandatory Palestine. It was located 16.5 km northwest of Tulkarm. Wadi al-Hawarith was mostly destroyed with the exception of four houses.

In 1945, Wadi al-Hawarith had a total population of 1,330.

The term also refers to the wider surrounding area, especially that which was subject to a controversial land sale in 1933. The sale included about 40,000 dunams of land (roughly 10,000 acres) within the Tulkarm subdistrict; the area sold is also considered to be "Wadi al-Huwarith," not just the village.

== History ==
The area was originally called the River of Wadi Iskandaruna, but its name changed to Wadi al-Hawarith when the Haritha tribe settled there in the late sixteenth and early seventeenth centuries. The Haritha tribe can be traced back to the Bani Sunbus tribe, who are believed to have descended from Tayyi, and ultimately from al-Qahtaniyya, a Yemeni tribe that split into smaller groups and migrated to the Hijaz, Iraq, Palestine, and Syria during the early Islamic conquests. The people of Wadi al-Hawarith were a branch of the Bani Sunbus.

=== British Mandate era ===
In the 1922 census of Palestine conducted by the British Mandate authorities, Wadi al-Hawarith had 812 inhabitants; 810 Muslims and 2 Christians, where the Christians were one Roman Catholic and one Maronite. The population had increased in the 1931 census to 1,112; 1,077 Muslims, 30 Jews and 5 Christians, in a total of 255 houses.

Until 1929, the people of Wadi al-Hawarith farmed the village land as tenants. That year, the Jewish National Fund acquired lands amounting to 30,800 dunams at auction from absentee landlords and initiated legal proceedings to evict the current tenants, who were Bedouin Palestinians that were resisting their removal. The British-appointed Shaw Commission notes that a "state of extreme apprehension" gripped the Palestinian public at large, whose members feared that they too would suffer the same fate of displacement at the hands of Jewish colonists. According to historian Weldon Matthews, the sale was "the third largest area acquired by the JNF [Jewish National Fund] during the mandate, and it gave Jews contiguous ownership of land in the coastal plain....Despite much of the land being swampy, it was in the heart of the citrus belt and consequently was of great commercial value."

Population estimates for the tribe in 1929 varied, with the Jewish Agency's Settlement Department reporting 850 people, the British high commissioner estimating between 1,000 and 1,200, and the tribal leader counting 1,500. The absentee owners of the land were the Tayans, a wealthy Christian family from Beirut, members of the urban Levantine merchant elite who "had accumulated extensive landholdings by the end of the Ottoman era."

The inhabitants of the area under question refused to leave and resisted British government efforts to encourage them to do so. A long legal battle ensued, including with national leader Awni Abd al-Hadi representing the local residents. These court proceedings were highly publicized in Palestine—"the lead story in the Arabic press" during early summer 1933— and ultimately contributed to the increased militancy of nationalist organizations during the period. The final eviction order was issued by the court on June 15, 1933, prompting calls for strikes and declarations of protest by such groups as the Istiqlal Party, the Palestine Communist Party, and the Congress of Youth, among others.

In 1933, after successfully evicting the people of Wadi al-Hawarith from a section of their land, Zionist settlers established three settlements close to Wadi al-Hawarith: Kfar Vitkin was south of village land, Mikhmoret to the west of Wadi al-Hawarith, north, and Ma'abarot southwest of Wadi al-Hawarith, south. Neither of these settlements were on village land. Furthermore, in 1934, Kfar Haroeh was settled on seized village land, and Geulei Teiman was settled on seized village land in 1947.

Village Statistics, compiled in 1938 by the Government Office of Statistics, recorded the population of Wadi al-Hawarith as 2974; out of them, 1716 Jews and 1258 Palestinians.

In the 1945 statistics, Wadi al-Hawarith (North) had 850 inhabitants, while Wadi al-Hawarith (South) had 480; 1,330 in total, all Muslims, and the total land area was 9,812 dunams. Palestinians used 960 dunams for cereals, while they owned 1,555 dunams of uncultivable land.

=== 1948 war ===
The Arab Liberation Army instructed in mid-February 1948 the inhabitants of Wadi al-Hawarith to evacuate their women and property to the Palestinian area, which it is unclear if they did. After an ambush by Haganah the month after, which killed three or four Palestinians, the inhabitants began to leave but stressing "that the Jews all along had promised them that nothing bad would happen to them" if they stayed. The British mandate authorities advised them to leave and helped with a military escort. The evacuation apparently took several weeks.

In early May, advisers of the Alexandroni Brigade recommended destroying the homes in Wadi al-Hawarith, except those of stone "that may be made fit for human [i.e., Jewish] habitation".

The Canadian Jewish Chronicle reported from Jerusalem on March 29, published on April 2, saying that the sudden mass exodus of Palestinian villagers "heightened the belief here that Arab gangs are preparing for an all-out assault on Tel Aviv and Jewish coastal areas in the immediate future." According to this article, the evacuees had always had friendly relations with the settlers. The evacuation apparently was coordinated between the Jews and Sheik Abu Kishek, head of a prominent tribe in the Tel Aviv area, and states that Sheik Kishek had spent the previous month at Mufti headquarters, and "reportedly got instructions to evacuate the area."

Four thousand Arabs evacuated Saturday, after suddenly selling their flocks and poultry to Jews. These mass evacuations coincide with the end of the citrus-picking season, which many observers expect will herald the beginning of large scale Arab assaults on the coastal area.

== Bibliography ==
- Adler (Cohen), Raya (1988). "The tenants of Wadi Hawarith: Another view of the land question in Palestine". International Journal of Middle East Studies. 20 (2): 197–220. doi:10.1017/S0020743800033936. JSTOR 162960. S2CID 163346325.
- Barron, J. B., ed. (1923). Palestine: Report and General Abstracts of the Census of 1922. Government of Palestine.
- Bracy, R. Michael (2010). Printing Class: 'Isa al-'Isa, Filastin, and the Textual Construction of National Identity, 1911-1931. University Press of America. ISBN 978-0761853770. (p. 99 ff)
- Department of Statistics (1945). Village Statistics, April, 1945. Government of Palestine.
- Hadawi, S. (1970). Village Statistics of 1945: A Classification of Land and Area ownership in Palestine. Palestine Liberation Organization Research Center.
- Khalidi, W. (1992). All That Remains: The Palestinian Villages Occupied and Depopulated by Israel in 1948. Washington D.C.: Institute for Palestine Studies. ISBN 0-88728-224-5.
- Mills, E., ed. (1932). Census of Palestine 1931. Population of Villages, Towns and Administrative Areas. Jerusalem: Government of Palestine.
- Morris, B. (2004). The Birth of the Palestinian Refugee Problem Revisited. Cambridge University Press. ISBN 978-0-521-00967-6.
- Oppenheim, M. Freiherr von (1943). "Die Beduinen. Die Beduinenstamme in Palastina, Transjordanien, Sinai. Hedjaz". International Journal of Middle East Studies. 2. Leipzig: 51–55.
