= Saint-M'Hervon =

Saint-M'Hervon Lanvaelvon
- Part of Montauban-de-Bretagne
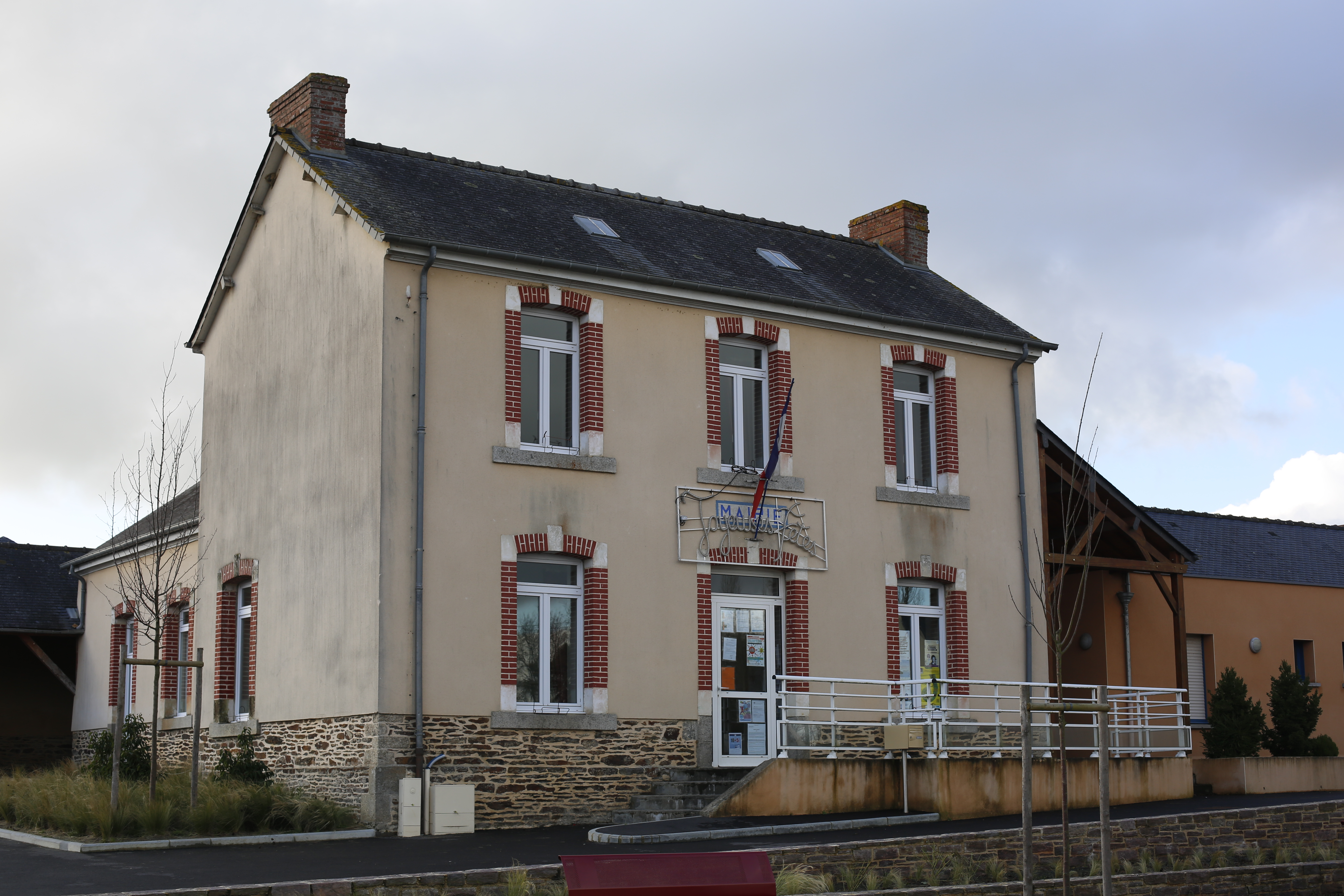
- The town hall of Saint-M'Hervon
- Location of Saint-M'Hervon
- Location within France Location within Brittany
- Coordinates: 48°13′45″N 2°03′27″W
- Country: France
- Region: Brittany
- Department: Ille-et-Vilaine
- Arrondissement: Rennes
- Canton: Montauban-de-Bretagne
- Commune: Montauban-de-Bretagne
- Area^{1}: 2.46 km^{2} (0.95 sq mi)
- Highest elevation: 112 m (367 ft)
- Lowest elevation: 71 m (233 ft)
- Population (2023): 644
  - Density: 262/km^{2} (678/sq mi)
- Time zone: UTC+01:00 (CET)
  - Summer (DST): UTC+02:00 (CEST)
- Postal code: 35360
- ^{1} French Land Register data, which excludes lakes, ponds, glaciers > 1 km^{2} (0.386 sq mi or 247 acres) and river estuaries.

Saint-M'Hervon (French pronunciation: [sɛ̃ mɛʁvɔ̃]; Breton: Lanvaelvon; Gallo: Saent-Mervon) is a former commune in the Ille-et-Vilaine department in Brittany in northwestern France. On 1 January 2019, it was merged into the commune Montauban-de-Bretagne. Inhabitants of Saint-M'Hervon are called saint-m'hervonais in French.

== See also ==
- Communes of the Ille-et-Vilaine department
