= Getting Closer =

Getting Closer may refer to:

- "Getting Closer" (Dollhouse), a 2010 episode of TV series Dollhouse
- "Getting Closer" (song), a 1979 song from the Wings album Back to the Egg
- Getting Closer!, a 1986 album by guitarist Phil Keaggy
