= Geva Alon =

Israeli musical artist

Geva Alon גבע אלון
- Also known as: גבע אלון
- Born: 30 May 1979 (age 47); Ma'abarot, Israel
- Genres: Alternative rock, indie rock, folk rock, indie folk, acoustic rock, blues rock, country rock, psychedelic folk, psychedelic rock
- Occupations: Singer-songwriter, musician
- Instruments: Guitar, vocals, piano
- Years active: 2000–present
- Website: myspace.com/gevaalon

Geva Alon (Hebrew: גבע אלון; born 30 May 1979) is an Israeli blues, folk and rock musician and singer-songwriter.

== Biography ==
Geva Alon was born and raised in Kibbutz Ma'abarot. He began playing guitar at the age of 12, and in the year 2000 became the founding member of the rock trio The Flying Baby which achieved relative success in Israel and while touring the US. The band released two albums: Inner World (2002) and Pain to Give (2004).

In 2004 he joined the Israeli indie rock singer, Shy Nobleman, with whom he played for three years. Alon contributed guitars, writing and vocals to Nobleman's "Beautiful Life" album and sang co-lead vocals on the radio hit ballad "Wonderful".

March 2006 saw his first solo album, Days of Hunger. Its acoustic country-flavored harmonies along with his distinct vocals and guitar made him a notable artist in Tel Aviv's folk indie scene.

Alon's Second solo release in 2007 The Wall of Sound included a cover version of David Bowie's "Modern Love", which became a major radio hit and enjoyed numerous placements as a cable television commercials soundtrack as well as broke through the charts on the major Israeli music radio station, Galgalatz.

Get Closer, Released in November 2009 and produced by the renowned Thom Monahan (Devendra Banhart, Vetiver, Silver Jews, Dinosaur Jr, Jayhawks), features Alon backed by the band Tree with a sound ranging from alternative rock to psychedelic guitars and Americana. Get Closer is Alon's most personal album yet, written after a long ten-month tour in the United States that culminated with Alon's performance at The Fillmore in Sept '08 in support of Paul Weller.

Alon has played several festival shows including support for Macy Gray in front of a crowd of 20,000 people (2009). His shows in support of Get Closer garnered high praise from Israeli rock critics.

On 22–23 March 2010, Geva Alon opened for Yo La Tengo at the trio's first appearance in Tel Aviv. He is also scheduled to play for Earth Day events in front of 100,000 people in Rabin's square in Tel Aviv.

On 2 December 2010, it was announced that Alon has signed a distribution deal with the label ADA Global to distribute his upcoming fourth album in Europe, upon release. Alon has celebrated the signing in a special show at the Barby Club in Tel Aviv on 7 January 2011, which was followed by a short European tour from mid-January until February.

On 10 March 2011, it was announced that in April, Alon would be entering Paco Loco Studios in Cádiz, Spain, with producer Thom Monahan with whom he worked on his 2009 album Get Closer, to record his fourth studio album. The album would be recorded with Vetiver members Otto Hauser (drums) and Daniel Hindman (guitar), and with Rufus Wainwright bassist Jeff Hill, instead of the usual backing band format Alon has used on his previous albums. In the meantime, Alon spent the summer of 2011 touring all over Europe promoting the European release of Get Closer and reaching wider audiences.

On 27 October 2011, Geva Alon has revealed the name of his fourth solo album to be In the Morning Light, through his Facebook page. He has also revealed the name of the first single off the album "I Wonder If She's Fine", with the expected release date of 30 October 2011.

On 19 November 2012, Alon's third album "Get Closer" has been certified gold album in Israel (selling more than 20,000 copies).

During 2014 Alon began to add to his show's setlist new songs he wrote in Hebrew. In October 2014, Alon officially announced on his Facebook page and on his YouTube channel that he's about to release his fifth solo album produced by him and by Amir Lev under the name "Tihi Iti" ("Be With Me"). This will be the first album Geva ever did in Hebrew. On 2 September 2014, Alon released the first single of the album, "Yam Shaket" ("Silent Sea"), on 26 October 2014 he released the album's second single, "Aba" ("Father"). In February 2015 his fifth studio album "Tihi Iti" ("Be With Me") was released.

== Discography ==
=== The Flying Baby ===
- Inner World, 2002
- Pain to Give, 2004

=== Solo albums ===
- Days of Hunger, 2006
- The Wall of Sound, 2007
- Get Closer, 2009
- In the Morning Light, 2011
- Be with me , 2014
- Searching for skies, 2018
- Follow, 2021
- I Never Land, 2024

=== Contributions and collaborations ===
- Beautiful Life, Shy Nobleman, 2005
- Adult Dreams, Arkadi Duchin, 2006
- Before I go to Sleep, Yaara Eilon, 2007
- How to Miss the Ground, Juviley, 2007
- A Tin Man's Love, Boaz Banai, 2008
- Self Titled, Ronit Kano, 2008
- New Directions, Gadi Altman, 2008
- Self Titled E.P., Yifat Ben Dror, 2008
- The Walking Man, The Walking Man, 2009
- Live at The Zappa, Amir Lev, (with Berry Sakharof), 2010
- All That Is Human, Eran Zur, 2010
- Another Passenger, Sagol 59, 2011
- אזרח של העולם ("Citizen of the World"), Hadag Nahash, 2016
