= The Wall of Sound =

Studio album by Geva Alon
- Released: 13 July 2007
- Genre: Alternative rock, folk rock, indie folk, blues rock, psychedelic folk
- Length: 50:51
- Label: Hatav Hashmini

Geva Alon chronology
Days of Hunger (2006)	The Wall of Sound (2007)	Get Closer (2009)

Singles from The Wall of Sound
- 1. "Modern Love" Released: 2007

The Wall of Sound is the second studio album by Israeli alternative folk artist Geva Alon, released on 13 July 2007.

One single was released from the album, a cover to David Bowie's classic hit single "Modern Love".

== Track listing ==
No.	Title	Length
1.	"In My Head"	5:12
2.	"Memories"	4:10
3.	"To Reach Her Love"	5:33
4.	"Cross Many Oceans"	5:42
5.	"Rosemary's Eyes"	4:34
6.	"The Wall of Sound"	6:40
7.	"Somewhere"	3:40
8.	"Modern Love" (David Bowie cover)	4:12
9.	"To Hear You Smile"	7:32
10.	"Sun Bird"	3:32
Total length:		50:51

== Personnel ==
- Geva Alon - lead vocals, guitar
- Elran Dekel - bass, backing vocals
- Nadav Hoshea - keyboards
- Or Zubalski - drums, percussion
- Mika Sade - backing vocals
