= Nahal Alexander =

River in Israel and Palestine

Coordinates: 32°23′46.08″N 34°51′56.53″E

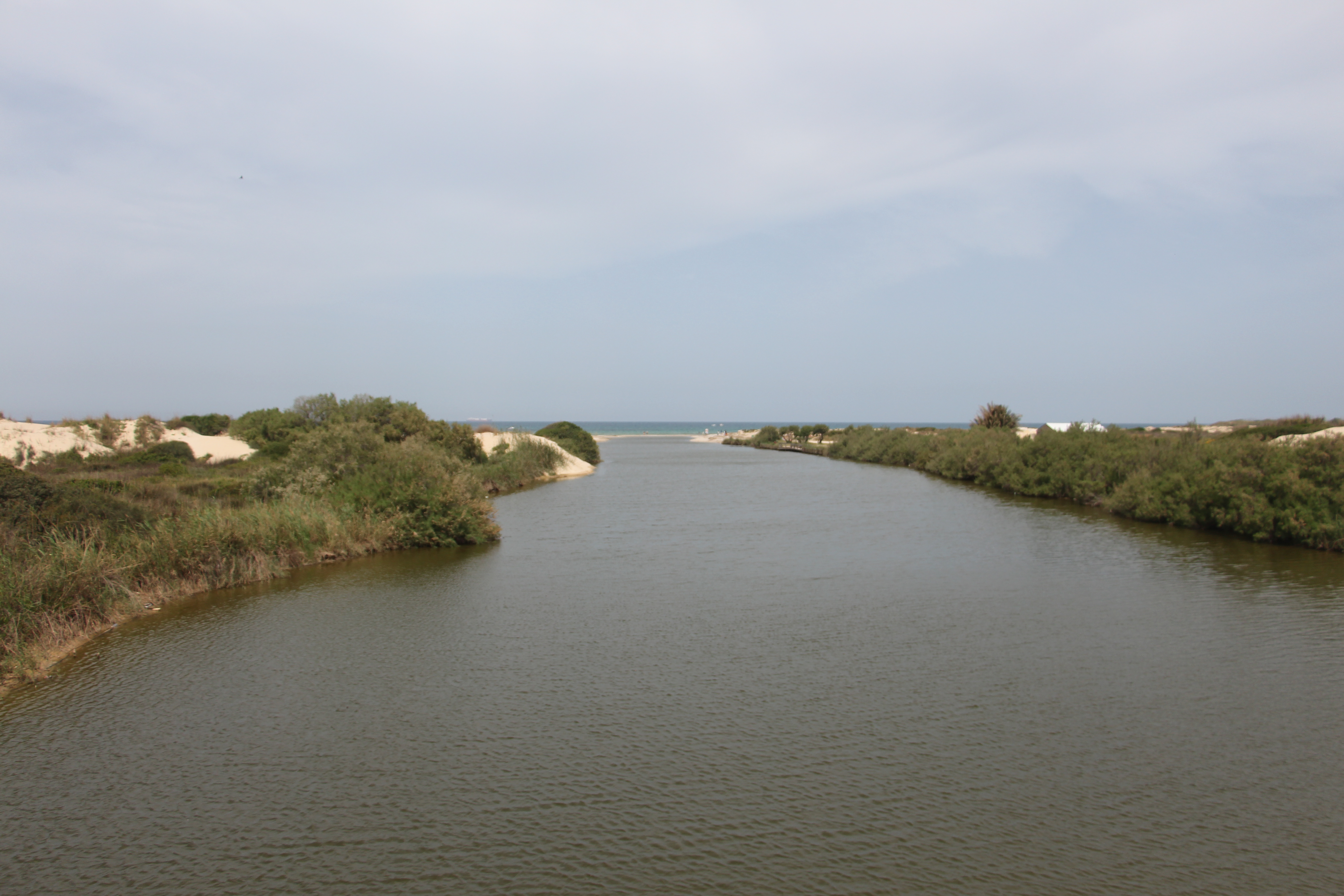
- Nahal Alexander flowing into the Mediterranean

Physical characteristics
- Length: 28 mi (45 km)

Nahal Alexander and Wadi Zeimar are the names of a river in Israel that flows from the western side of the Samaria mountain belt in the West Bank to the Mediterranean Sea north of Netanya, mostly through the Hefer Valley. Nahal Alexander (Hebrew: נחל אלכסנדר, romanized: Alexander Stream, Arabic: Nahr Iskanderuneh) is the name of the lower 32 km section of the 44 km long river, while Wadi Zeimar is the Arabic name of its upper, 32 km long section. The river starts southeast of Kafr Abbush, and its drainage basin drains the Nablus and central Samaria areas, as well as part of the coastal plain. It is the habitat of soft-shell turtles that can reach a size of 1.20 meters, and its lower course with its surroundings is declared a national park.

The stream receives water from Nahal Shechem, Wadi et-Tin/Nahal Te'enim, Nahal Ometz, Nahal Behan and Nahal Avichail (named after the moshav).

== Etymology ==
=== Iskanderuneh, Alexander ===
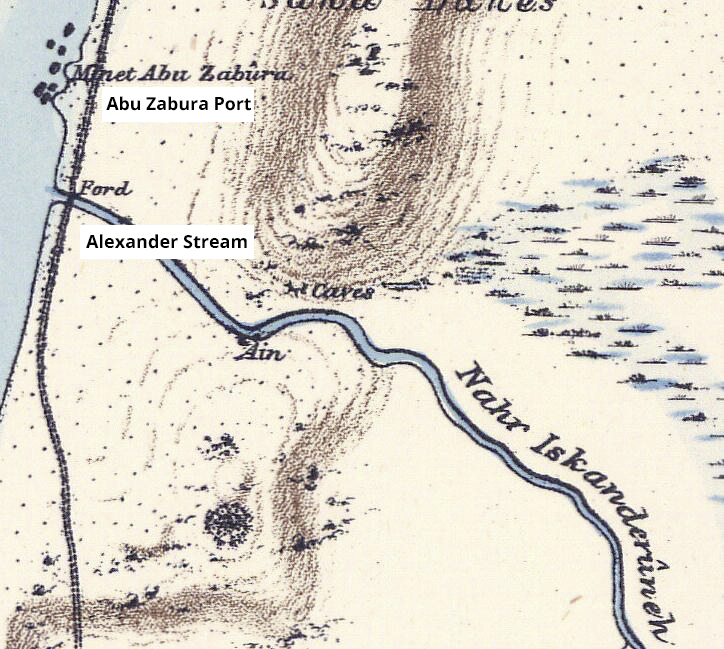
Alexander Stream and the Abu Zabura anchorage. SWP map, 1880

The old Arabic name of the stream is "Nahr Iskanderuneh", nahr being the Arabic term for a perennial stream. The Israeli Government Naming Committee connected it to Alexander Jannaeus, a Hasmonean king who conquered the area of the stream in the 1st-century BCE. The truth, however, is that the name comes from an Arab merchant, Iskander Abu Zabura, a resourceful watermelon merchant who lived in the 19th century. He exported his ware, which was produced in Wadi al-Hawarith - the Hefer Valley -, to Egypt, shipping it on boats from an ancient anchorage in what is known today as the Mikhmoret bay, and which back then became named after him, "Minet Abu Zabura" ('Abu Zabura Port'), as reported by Judith Montefiore in 1839. The Ottoman officials even established a customs house on a hill on the north bank of the stream near the anchorage to collect taxes from the watermelon trade. The anchorage is marked on the 1880 PEF Survey of Western Palestine map at a location near today's Moshav Mikhmoret.

== Flora and fauna ==
Nahal Alexander is the habitat of soft-shell turtles that can reach a size of 1.20 meters and weigh up to 50 kilograms. In addition to giant turtles, there are coots and other waterfowl, nutrias and swamp cats. Indigenous fish include catfish, tilapia, river eels and mullet. On the southern bank there are shifting sand dunes and on the northern bank, a eucalyptus grove.

With their being approximately 450 breeding female green sea turtles in the Mediterranean, the National Sea Turtle Rescue Center was created in the Alexander Stream National Park, and it houses veterinary hospital and surgical facilities, an acclimation area for turtles, an education centre open to the public, and facilities for the breeding and study of green sea turtles.

== History ==
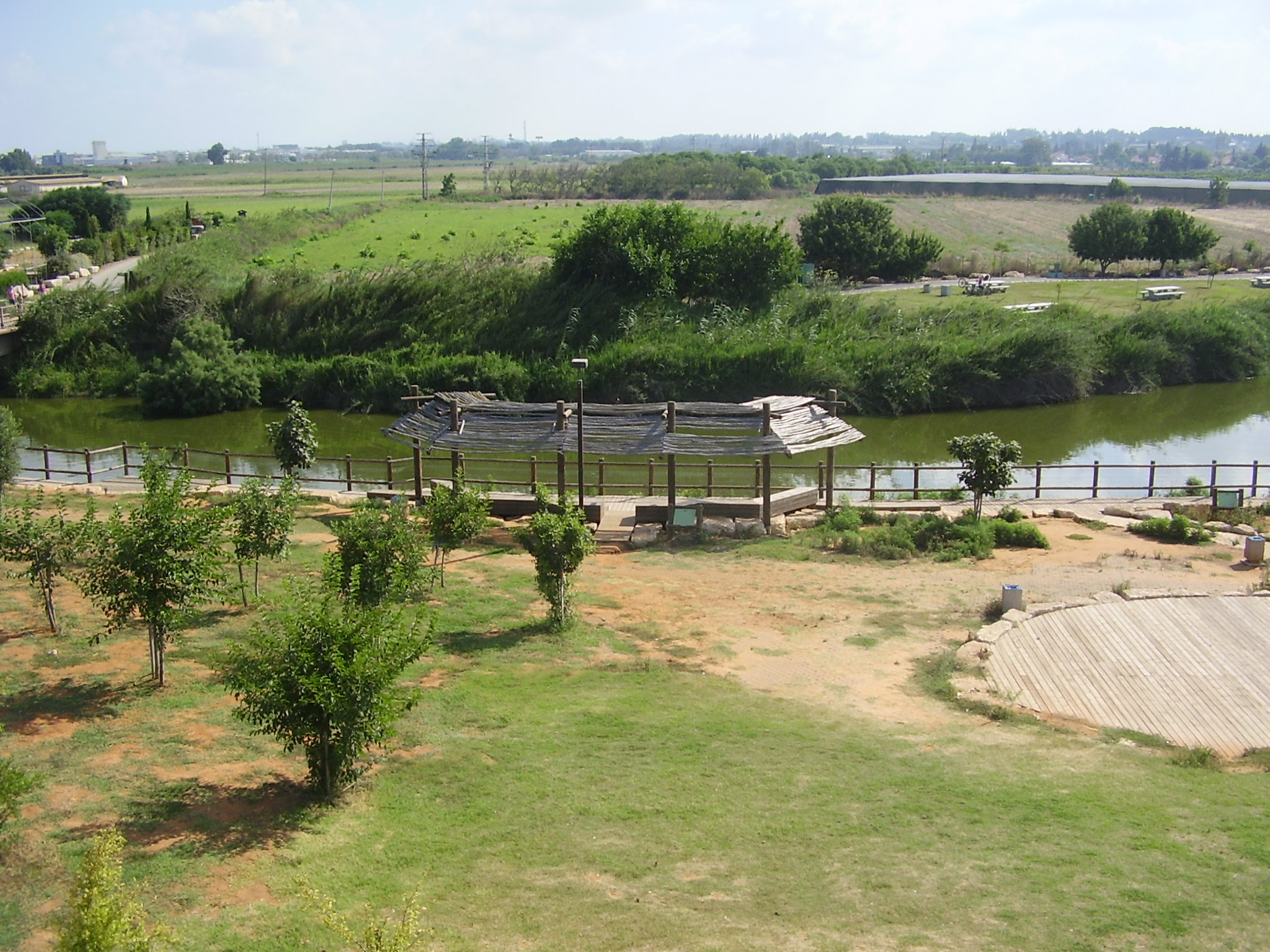
Nahal Alexander, near Turtle Bridge

Hurvat Samra (Khirbet Samra), an old ruin on a hill overlooking Nahal Alexander, may have been a customs station for goods transported down the river to the port near the estuary (see #Etymology).

Beit Yanai beach, named by the Names Committee after Alexander Yannaeus, is located where the river flows into the Mediterranean. North of the beach are remnants of a quay built in 1938, during the British Mandate. It was used for clandestine Jewish immigration to Mandatory Palestine when British authorities turned away ships of European Jews fleeing the Nazis.

In the winter of 1991, Nahal Alexander overflowed and most of its soft-shelled turtle population drifted into the Mediterranean. When the remaining eggs failed to hatch, the Israel Nature and Parks Authority launched a project to collect the eggs, incubate them, and return the turtles to the water.

In 2003, Nahal Alexander was part of a cleanup project that won first prize in the International Riverprize environmental rehabilitation competition in Australia after being one of the most polluted rivers in Israel.

== Gallery ==
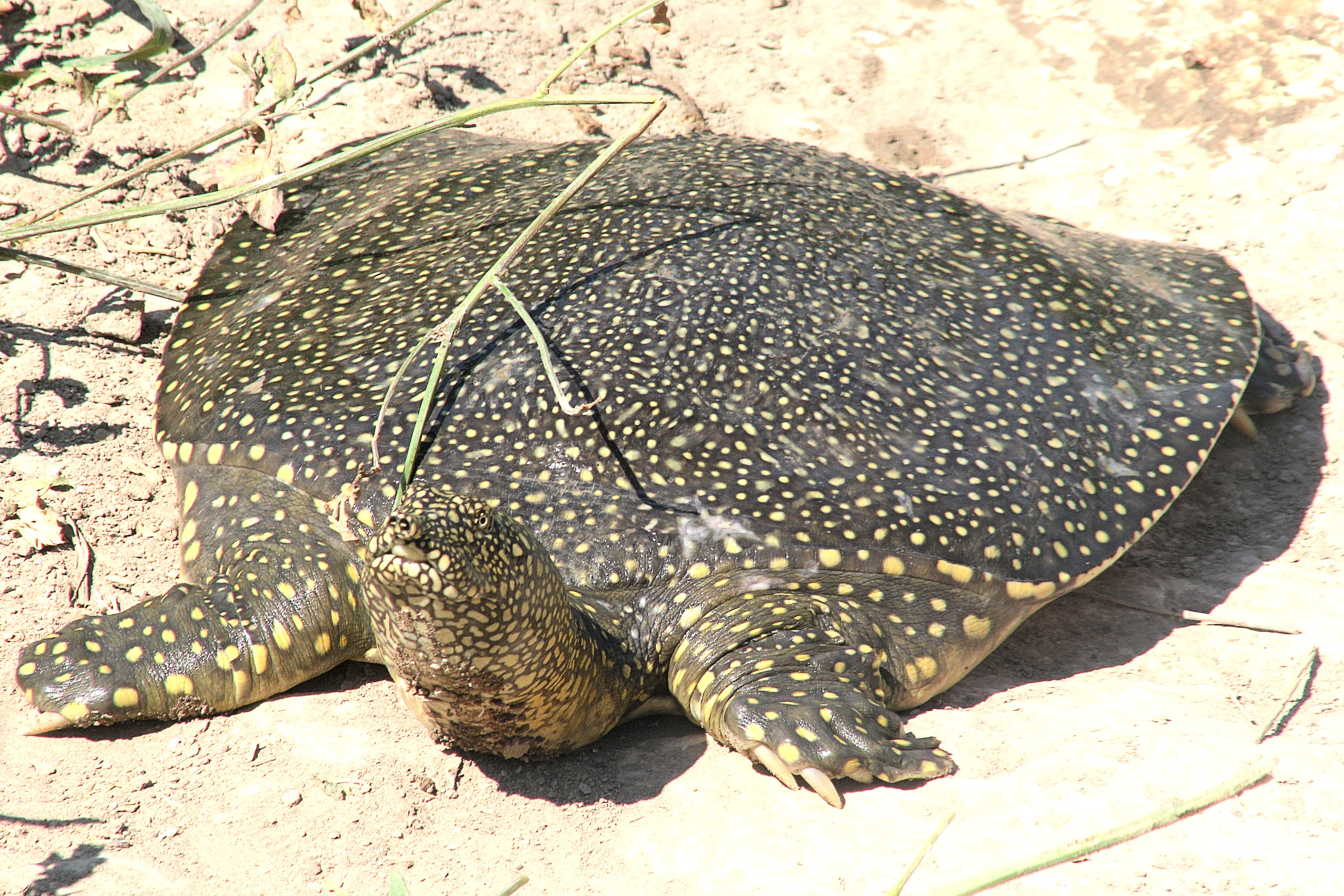
African softshell turtle at Nahal Alexander

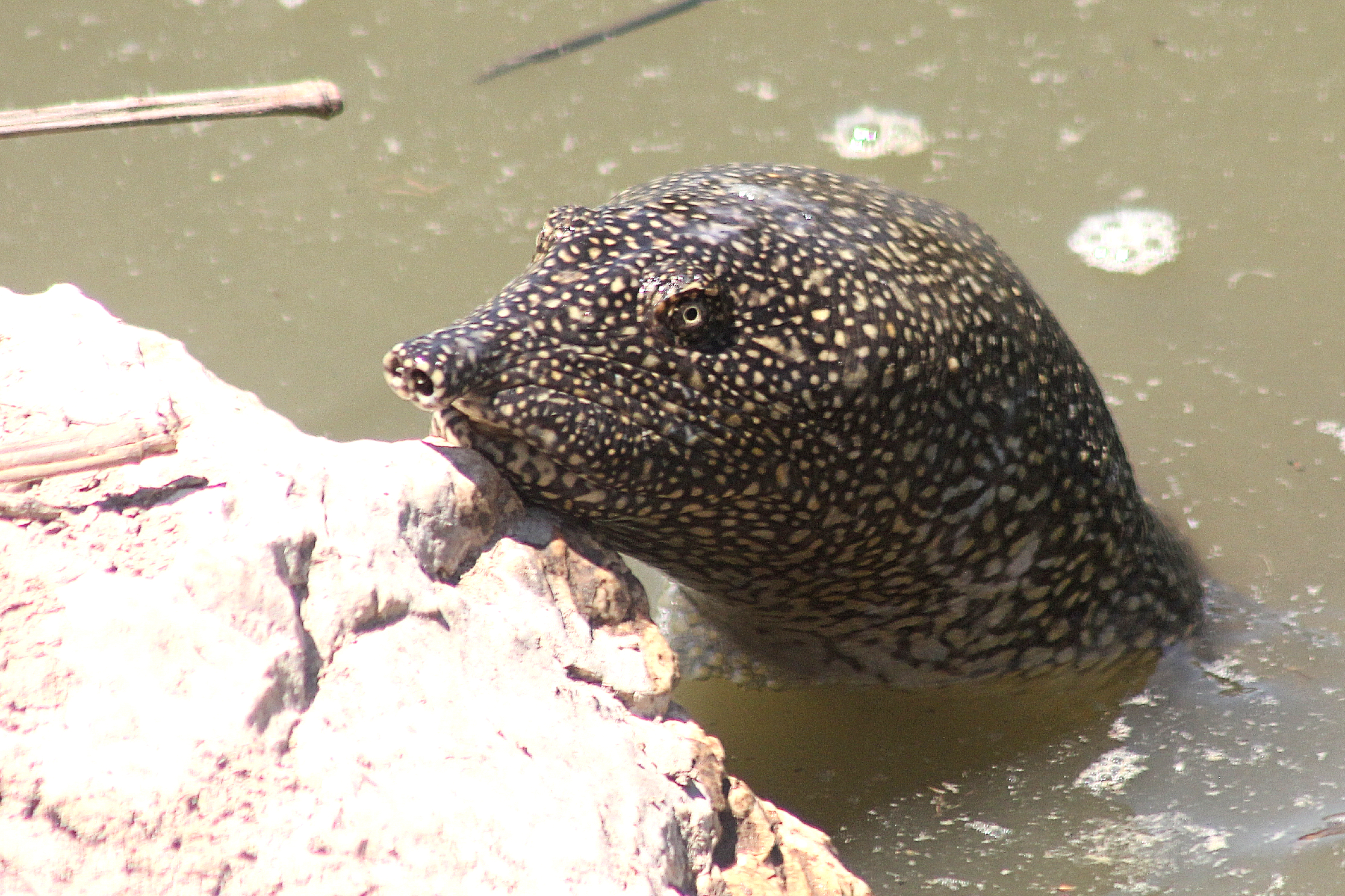
Head of African softshell turtle at Nahal Alexander

African softshell turtle with red-eared sliders at Nahal Alexander

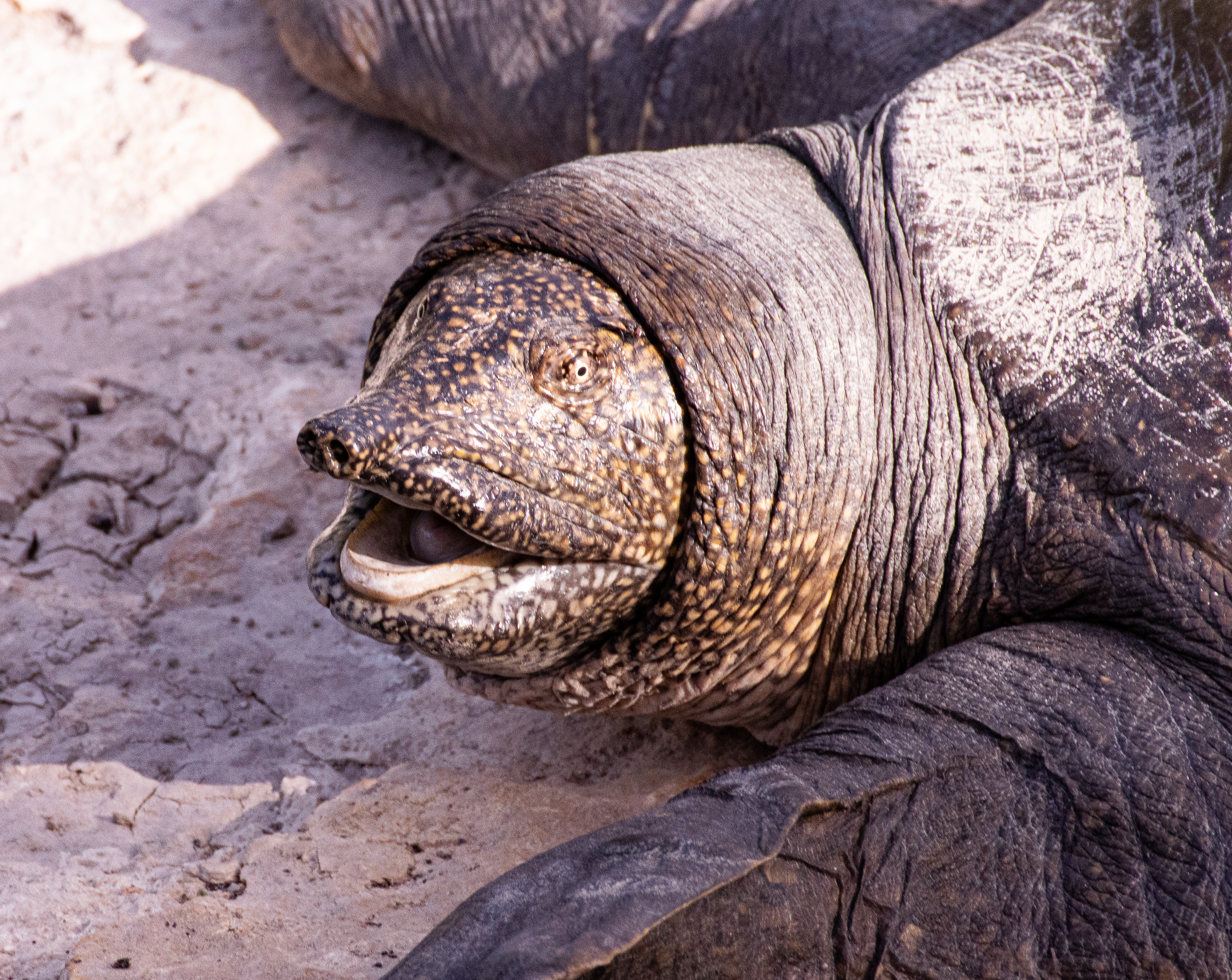
Head and neck of African softshell turtle at Nahal Alexander

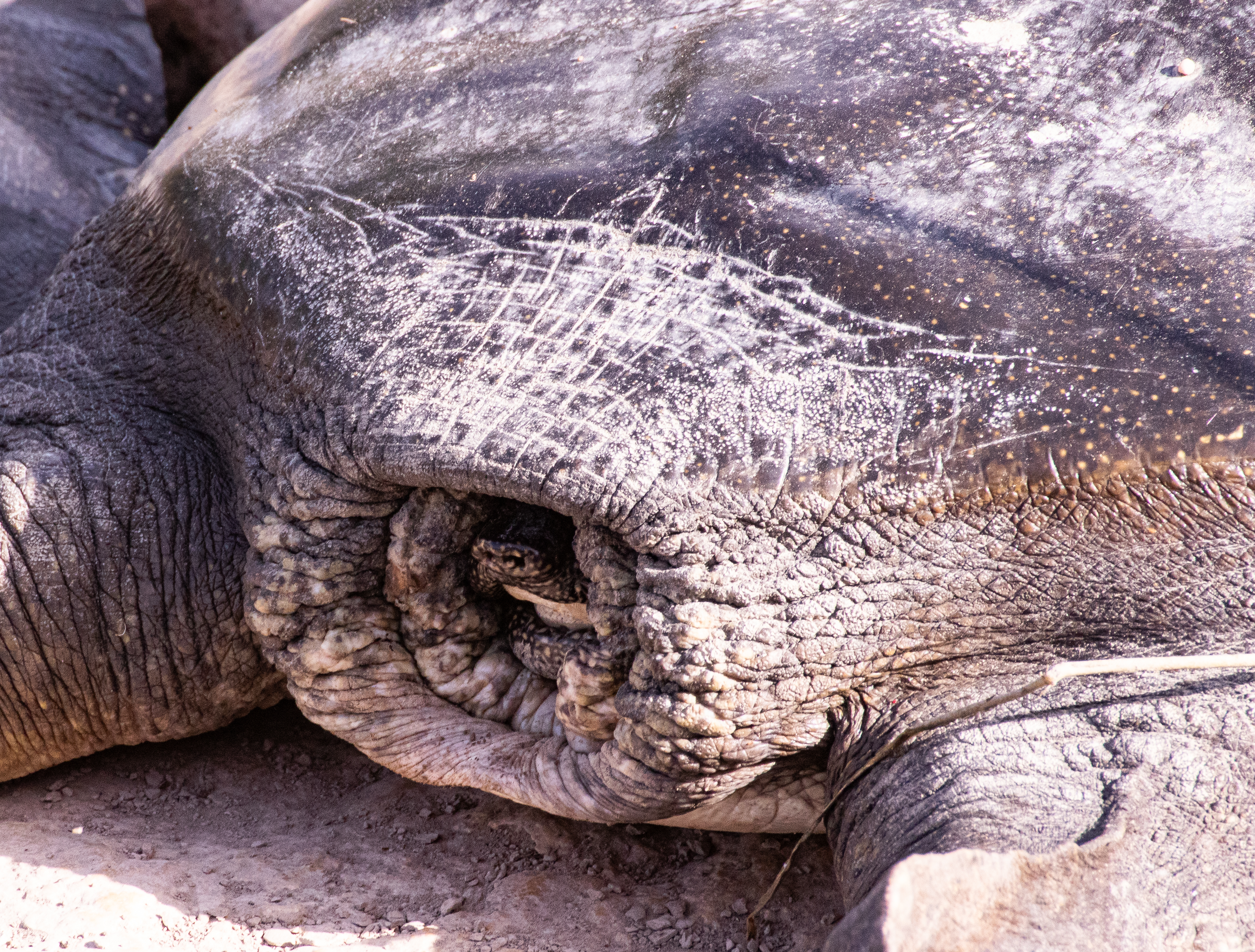
Head and neck (retracted) of African softshell turtle at Nahal Alexander

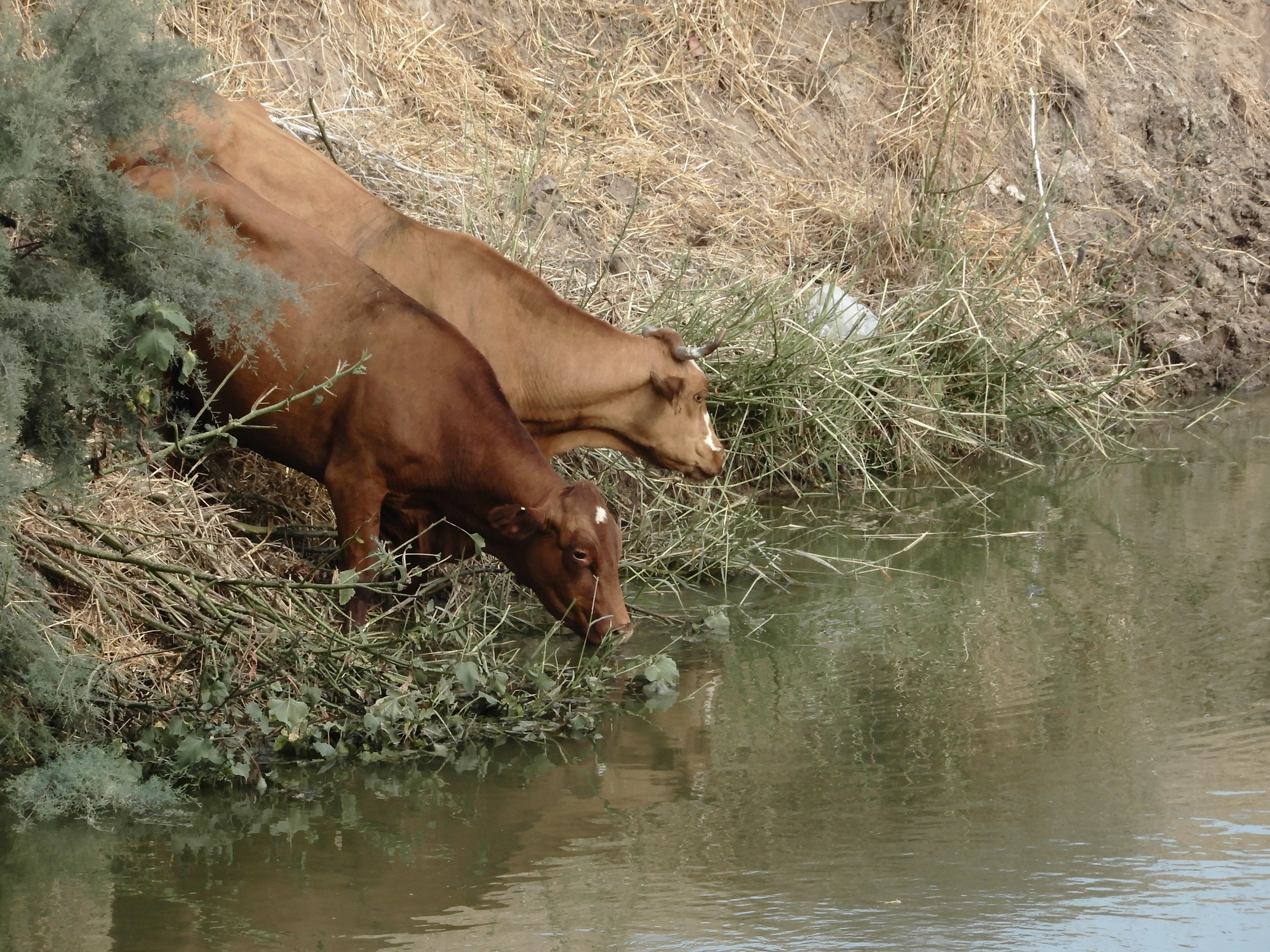
Nahal Alexander wildlife

== See also ==
- Biodiversity in Israel and Palestine
- Geography of Israel
- Geography of the State of Palestine
- List of rivers of Israel
- National parks and nature reserves of Israel
- Tourism in Israel
- Tourism in the State of Palestine
- Wildlife of Israel
