= Play thru Me =

Studio album by Phil Keaggy
- Released: August 1982
- Studio: Sound Recorders (Kansas City, Kansas); Weddington Studios (North Hollywood, California)
- Genre: Rock; Jazz
- Length: 43:49
- Label: Sparrow, Myrrh
- Producer: Bob Cotton; Phil Keaggy

Phil Keaggy chronology
Town to Town (1981)	Play thru Me (1982)	Underground (1983)

Professional ratings
Review scores
Source	Rating
AllMusic	3/5 stars

Play thru Me is an album by guitarist Phil Keaggy, released in 1982, on Sparrow Records.

== Track listing ==
All songs written by Phil Keaggy, unless otherwise noted.

=== Side one ===
1. "Happy" – 2:48
2. "Carefree" – 4:41
3. "Nobody's Playgirl Now" – 4:04 (Note: The CD version fades this track out at 3:39, thus omitting Keaggy's spontaneous shouts at the end in his "big" voice (as he refers to it in the LP notes). The original version has been restored to the album on Keaggy's BandCamp page.)
4. "Cherish The Moment" – 4:59
5. "She Came to Stay" – 3:35
6. "Papa Song" – 3:11

=== Side two ===
1. "The Wall" – 2:45
2. "Make a Change" – 3:31
3. "Train to Glory" – 3:09
4. "Play thru Me" – 4:26
5. "His Master's Voice" – 3:09
6. "Morning Light" (inspired by Thomas Toplady's poem "Above the Hills of Time") – 3:31

== Personnel ==
- Phil Keaggy – lead vocals, backing vocals, guitars, bass (2, 4-12)
- Smitty Price – keyboards
- Hadley Hockensmith – bass (1, 3)
- Jim DeLong – drums
- Michael Fisher – percussion
- Phil's wife Bernadette and their then 16-month-old daughter Alicia contribute vocals on "Papa Song"

== Production ==
- Phil Keaggy – producer, arrangements
- Bob Cotton – producer, engineer
- Wally Grant – engineer
- Steve Hall – mastering at MCA Recording Studios (North Hollywood, California)
- Stan Evenson – art direction, design
- John O'Brien – design
- Mark Hanauer – photography
