= Get Closer (Geva Alon album) =

Studio album by Geva Alon
- Released: 10 November 2009
- Genres: Alternative rock, indie rock, folk rock, indie folk
- Length: 43:36
- Label: High Fidelity
- Producer: Thom Monahan

Geva Alon chronology
The Wall of Sound (2007)	Get Closer (2009)	In the Morning Light (2012)

Singles from Get Closer
- 1. "The Wind Whispers" Released: 1 October 2009; 2. "I Can See the Stars" Released: 18 October 2009; 3. "Come Race Me" Released: 22 December 2009

Get Closer is the third studio album by Israeli alternative folk artist Geva Alon, released on 10 November 2009. The album was produced and mixed by Thom Monahan who has previously worked with the Pernice Brothers, Vetiver, Devendra Banhart and more.

Three singles were released from the album: "The Wind Whispers" on 1 October 2009, "I Can See the Stars" on 18 October 2009 and "Come Race Me" on 22 December 2009.

== Track listing ==
No.	Title	Length
1.	"Here Comes the Tune"	3:41
2.	"Help Me Girl"	2:41
3.	"Come Race Me"	4:35
4.	"The Wind Whispers"	4:02
5.	"I Can See the Stars"	4:00
6.	"Comet"	4:43
7.	"The Folks Back Home"	6:25
8.	"Fade Away With You"	3:50
9.	"Green Valley"	2:01
10.	"Get Closer Now"	7:39
Total length:		43:36

== Personnel ==
- Geva Alon - lead vocals, guitar
- Ben Golan - guitar, vocals
- Dor Koren - bass
- Naveh Koren - drums, percussion
