= Wall of Sound (Seattle) =

Record shop in Seattle, Washington, U.S.

Coordinates: 47°36′50.4″N 122°19′0″W

- Logo

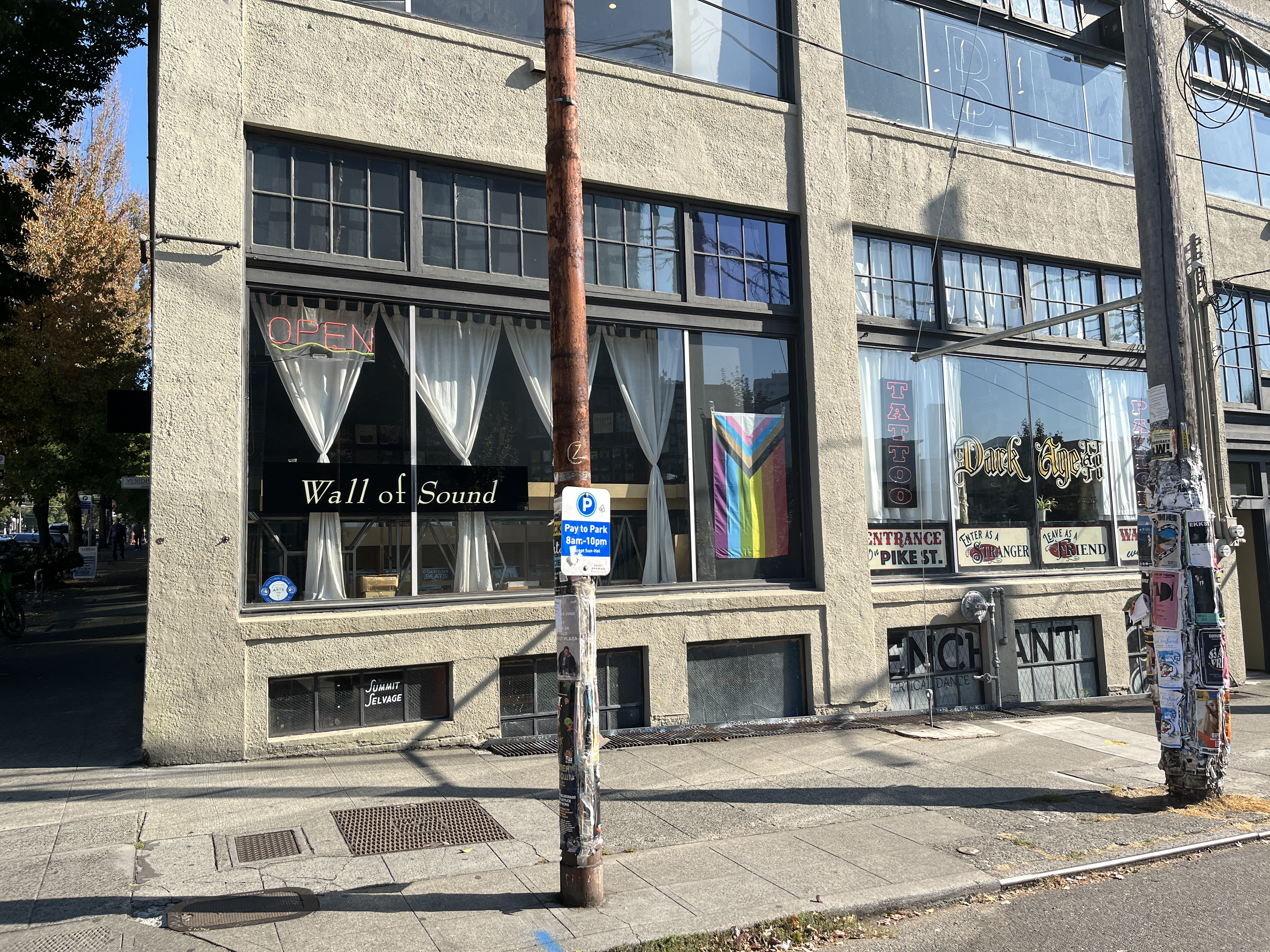
- The record shop's exterior in 2022

Wall of Sound was a record shop on Seattle's Capitol Hill, in the U.S. state of Washington. It closed permanently in 2026.

== Description ==
The record shop Wall of Sound was located on Capitol Hill and stocked media in a variety of genres such as avant-garde, electronic jazz, and world music. Shane Handler of Glide magazine said Wall of Sound "specializes in avant garde, Japanese, Noise, Industrial, Indie, Alternative, Art Rock, Free-jazz, Folk, Experimental, Ambient, World, Electronic, Electro-Acoustic, Neo-classical and other genres for the discriminating listener. That being said, the main focus is avant garde/experimental and world music." The Seattle Times called the shop "tiny but expertly curated". Fodor's said, "If you're on the hunt for Japanese avant-rock on LP, antiwar spoken word, spiritual reggae with Afro-jazz undertones, or old screen-printed show posters, you've found the place. Obscure, experimental, adventurous, and good? Wall of Sound probably has it."

== History ==
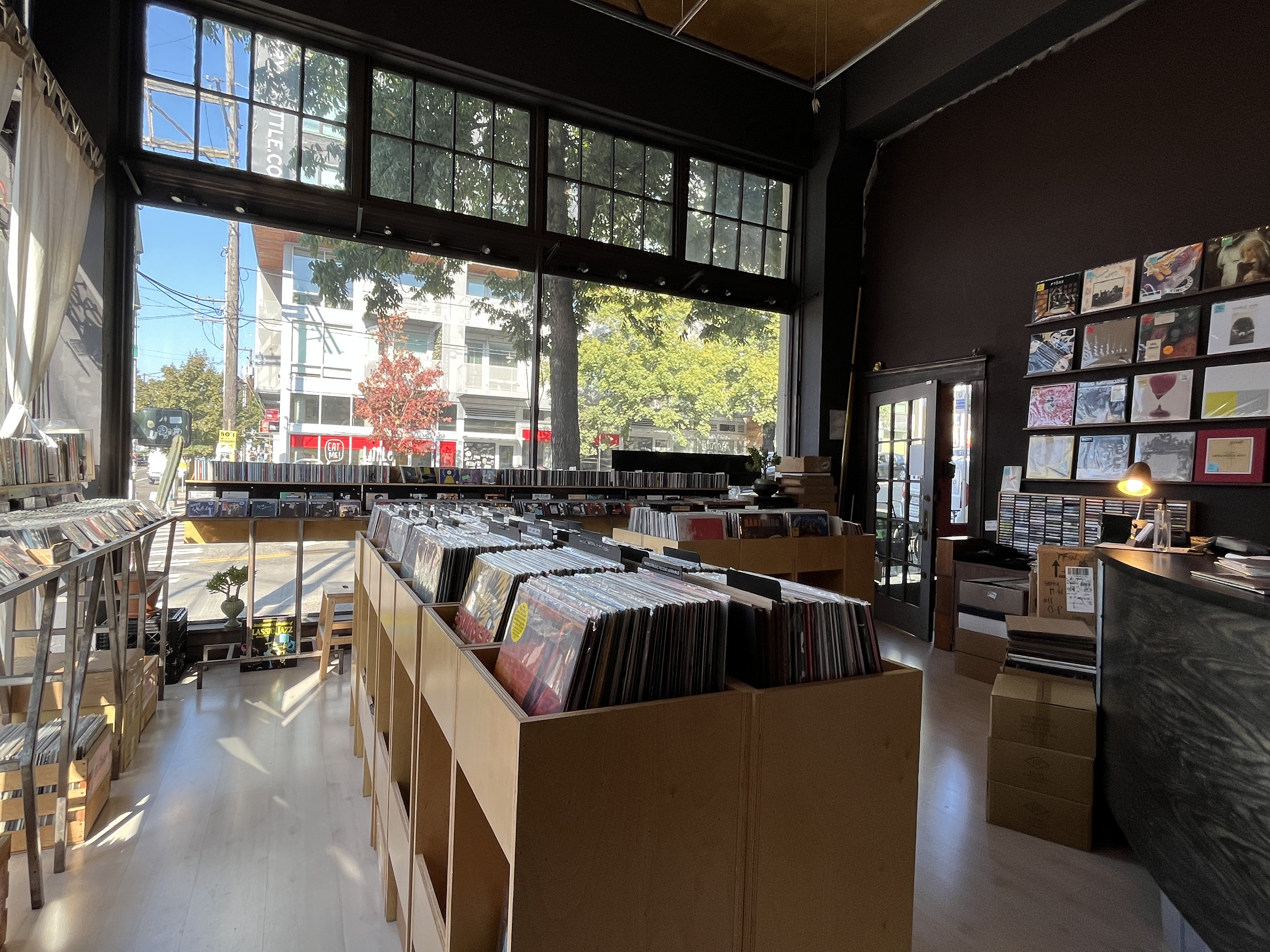
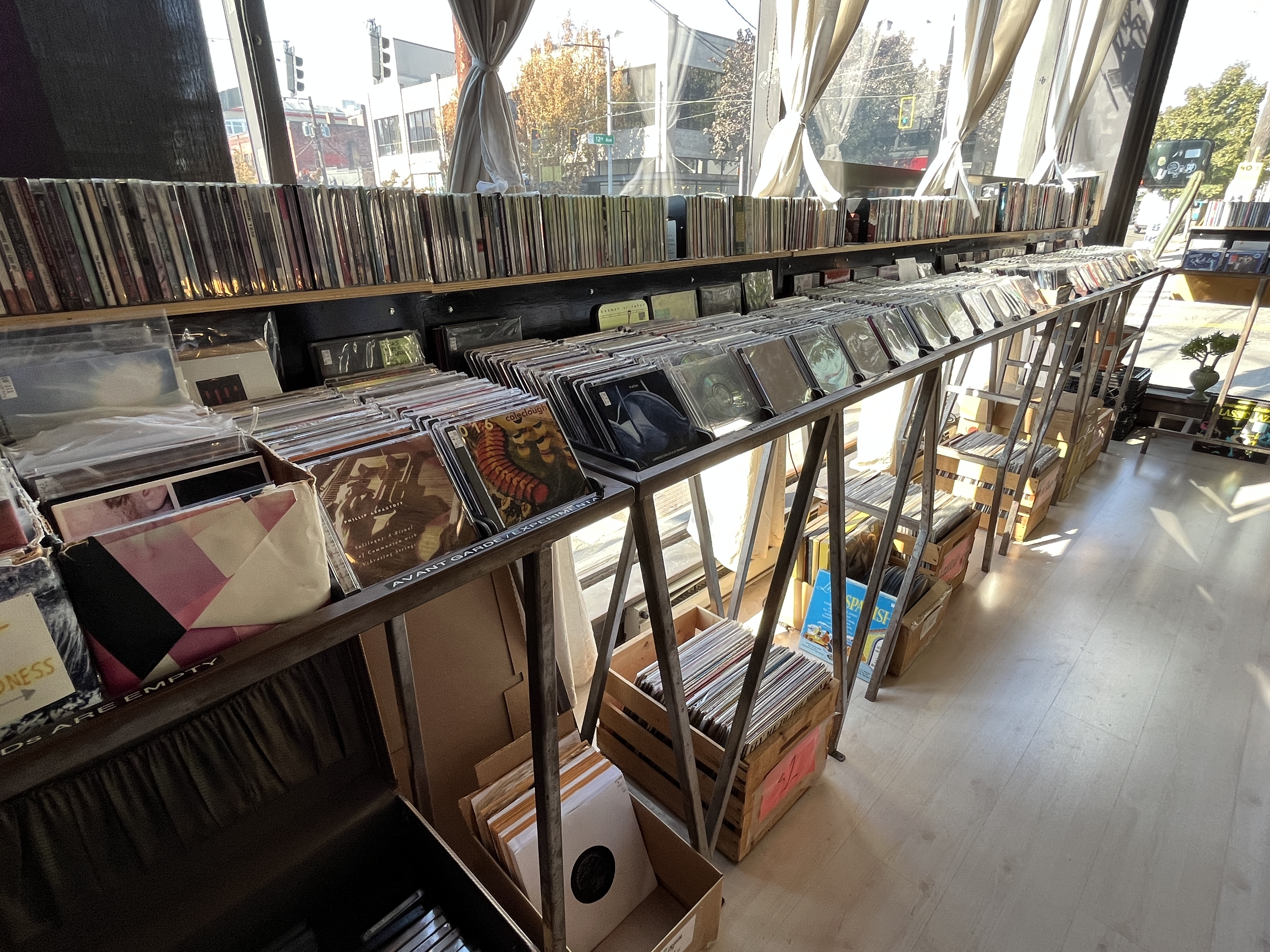
The shop's interior in 2022

Mark Sullo and Eric Hoffman opened the shop at the intersection of Second Avenue and Bell Street in Seattle's Belltown neighborhood in May 1990. Jeffrey Taylor and Michael Ohlenroth purchased Wall of Sound in 2000. The business moved to Pine Street on Capitol in 2003, and later relocated to the intersection of 12th and Pike Street.

In January 2004, Wall of Sound started sponsoring a monthly concert at the Jewel Box Theater to promote the store and local musicians. The shop has offered specials for Record Store Day.

The shop closed permanently in 2026.

== Reception ==
Shane Handler of Glide magazine wrote, "With vinyl being the preferred medium and with its self-professed discriminating tastes, Wall of Sound is like the Waldorf Astoria of record shops... The likes of Bjork, Pink and Phil Lesh have all browsed through Wall of Sound in the past as it serves a necessary stopping point in one the U.S.’s most vital musical cities/communities." In 2014, Lonely Planet's Brendan Sainsbury wrote, "Bedroom-sized Wall of Sound has a civilized, studious air and a penchant for avant-garde sounds. If you’re into esoterica or weird musical subgenres such as ‘Japanoise’, this could be heaven."

In 2016, Wall of Sound received honorable mention in the Best Record Store category of Seattle Weekly's annual readers' poll. Dave Segal included the shop in The Stranger's 2017 list of "the 5 best places to buy vinyl in Seattle" and wrote, "Small but exquisitely curated, Wall of Sound has been to Seattle what the defunct Other Music was to New York City: the place with the highest ratio of amazing, obscure, eclectic vinyl from around the world."
