= Getting Closer! =

Studio album by Phil Keaggy
- Released: 1985
- Studio: Weddington Studios (North Hollywood, California); Whitefield Studios (Santa Ana, California); Peace in the Valley (Arieta, California)
- Genre: Rock; Pop
- Length: 46:05 (LP release); 52:25 (CD re-release)
- Label: Nissi
- Producer: Smitty Price; Phil Keaggy

Phil Keaggy chronology
Underground (1983)	Getting Closer! (1985)	Way Back Home (1986)

1999 re-release cover art

Getting Closer! is an album by guitarist Phil Keaggy, released in 1985, on Nissi Records.

== Track listing ==
All songs were written by Phil Keaggy, unless otherwise noted.

=== LP ===
Side one

1. "Where Has Our Love Gone" - 3:40
2. "Passport" - 4:13
3. "I Will Be There" - 5:00
4. "Getting Closer" (Keaggy / Richard Souther / Dave Spurr) - 4:09
5. "Movie" (Keaggy / John Mehler) - 4:59

Side two

1. "Sounds" - 6:05
2. "Like an Island" - 3:50
3. "Look Deep Inside" - 5:08
4. "Riverton" (Keaggy / Souther) - 3:54
5. "Reaching Out" (Keaggy / Bernadette Keaggy) - 4:31

=== CD (re-release) ===
1. "Look Deep Inside" - 5:54
2. "Where Has Our Love Gone" - 3:15
3. "Movie" (Keaggy / Mehler) - 5:02
4. "Like an Island" - 3:53
5. "Riverton" (Keaggy / Souther) - 3:56
6. "Sounds" - 6:08
7. "Get Up and Go" (bonus track) - 2:47
8. "Passport" - 4:15
9. "Getting Closer" (Keaggy / Souther / Spurr) - 4:12
10. "Sunrise" (bonus track) - 3:20
11. "I Will Be There" - 5:01
12. "Reaching Out" (Keaggy / Keaggy) - 4:34

The CD reissue adds "Get Up and Go" and "Sunrise", both recorded around the same time as the rest of the album but left off for various reasons.

== Personnel ==
Credits taken from CD re-release.

- Phil Keaggy – vocals (1–4, 6–12), guitars, bass (1–5, 7, 9, 10, 12), E-mu Drumulator programming
- Smitty Price – keyboards, LinnDrum programming
- Rhett Lawrence – Fairlight synthesizer programming
- Richard Souther – keyboards (5)
- John Patitucci – bass (6, 8, 11)
- Dave Spurr – drums (6, 8, 11)
- Jim Keltner – drums (10)
- John Mehler – backing vocals (3)
- Bernadette Keaggy – spoken voice (7)

=== Production ===
- Bob Cotton – executive producer, engineer
- Phil Keaggy – producer
- Smitty Price – producer, engineer
- Joe Bellamy – engineer
- Walter Grant – engineer
- Peter Haden – engineer
- Terry Lang – engineer
- Bob Lockhart – engineer
- Mike Ross – engineer
- Chris Taylor – engineer
- Steve Hall – original mastering at Future Disc (Hollywood, California)
- John August Schroter – remixing, remastering
- Paul Schwotze – remixing, remastering
- Studio Distinctive (Colorado Springs, Colorado) – remixing and remastering location
- Stan Evenson – original art direction, cover concept
- Ed Rother – art direction (CD re-release)
- Lisa Powers – photography
- Proper Management – management
