= Jean Sulivan =

French writer and poet (1913–1980)

- Born: Joseph Lemarchand; 30 October 1913; Montauban-de-Bretagne, in Ille-et-Vilaine
- Died: 16 February 1980 (aged 66); Paris
- Occupations: Priest; Writer

Jean Sulivan was the pseudonym of Joseph Lemarchand (born 30 October 1913 in Montauban (now Montauban-de-Bretagne), Ille-et-Vilaine; died 16 February 1980 in Boulogne-Billancourt, Hauts-de-Seine), a French priest and writer.

== Works ==
=== Late 1950s ===
- 1958: Le Voyage intérieur, Plon
- 1959: L'insurrection du prince
- 1959: Provocation ou la faiblesse de Dieu

=== 1960s ===
- 1960: Le bonheur des rebelles, Plon
- 1960: Le Prince et le mal, Paris, Spes
- 1961: Ligne de crête Plon
- 1962: Paradoxe et scandale, Plon
- 1962: Du côté de l'ombre, Éditions Gallimard
- 1964: Mais il y a la mer, Gallimard
- 1965: Le plus petit abîme, Gallimard
- 1966: Devance tout adieu, Gallimard, Prix des écrivains de l'Ouest (1988)
- 1966: Car je t'aime, ô Éternité !, Gallimard
- 1967: L'Obsession de Delphes, Gallimard
- 1968: Bonheur des rebelles, Gallimard
- 1968: Consolation de la Nuit, Gallimard
- 1968: Dieu au-delà de Dieu, Gallimard, series "Les Essais"
- 1969: Les Mots à la gorge, Gallimard
- 1969: Miroir brisé, Gallimard

=== 1970s ===
- 1970: D'Amour et de mort à Mogador, Gallimard
- 1971: Petite littérature individuelle followed by Logique de l'écrivain chrétien, Gallimard, series "Voies ouvertes" directed by Jean Sulivan
- 1974: Joie errante, Gallimard
- 1975: Je veux battre le tambour, Gallimard
- 1976: Matinales I : Itinéraire spirituel, Gallimard, Prix Bretagne (1976) Morning Light: The Spiritual Journal of Jean Sulivan
- 1977: Matinales II : La Traversée des illusions, Gallimard, Passez les passants, postface to Henri Guillemin, Sulivan ou la parole libératrice, Gallimard.
- 1979: "La Dévotion moderne", introduction to L'imitation de Jésus-Christ, nouvelle traduction du Latin par Michel Billon, Desclée de Brouwer, series "Connivence"
- 1978: L'instant l'éternité, conversations with Bernard Feillet, Éditions du Centurion
- 1979: Quelque temps de la vie de Jude et Cie, Stock

=== 1980s and later ===
- 1980: L'Exode, Desclée de Brouwer
- 1980:Parole du passant, Le Centurion-Panorama Aujourd'hui, Paris

___________

- 1981: L'Écart et l'alliance, Gallimard
- 1986: Bloc-notes, preface by Jacques de Bourbon Busset, éditions SOS du Secours catholique
- 1994:Une lumière noire, about Hubert Beuve-Méry, Paris, éditions Arléa

=== Archives ===
In early 2011, Jean Sulivan's archives were deposited by Édith Delos, the legatee of Jean Sulivan, at the Institut mémoires de l'édition contemporaine. Car je t'aime, éternité ("Eternity, My Beloved") tells the story of a rebel priest, Jerome Strozzi, who falls between the cracks of both church and state during the German occupation of Paris during World War II. Befriending prostitutes, petty thieves and con-men, he becomes the unofficial pastor of the city's notorious Pigalle area. Told by a skeptical narrator who is himself searching for Strozzi's secret, the contemporary lyric masterpiece becomes a sustained meditation on love and freedom.

== Bibliography and documents ==
=== Anthologies ===
- 1996: Pages, édition de Marie Botturi, Edith Delos, Marguerite Genzbittel, Gallimard
- 2006: Jean Sulivan. Libre sous le regard de Dieu, presentation by Patrick Gormally and Mary Ann Mannion, Fides, Quebec
- 2003: L'incessante marche. Extraits de Jean Sulivan, selection by Joseph and Maryvonne Thomas, Mine de Rien, Néant-sur-Ivel
- 2010: Jean Sulivan Abécédaire, edition established and presented by Charles Austin, Gallimard ISBN 978-2-07-013178-5

=== Sources ===
- « Jean Sulivan », mentioned in chapter "Roman et idéologies d'après-guerre. 2.:Orthodoxies et création" in Littérature XXe siècle - Textes et documents, Collection Henri Mitterand, Éditions Nathan, revised and updated edition - printing in February 2001, p. 525.
- Henri Guillemin, Sulivan ou la Parole libératrice followed by Passez les passants by Jean Sulivan, Gallimard, 1977.
- « Le sacrement de l'instant. Présence de Jean Sulivan », Question de, n°80
- Rencontres avec Jean Sulivan, Revue de l'Association des Amis de Jean Sulivan, directrice de publication : Édith Delos, directeur de rédaction: Claude Goure
- Claude Lebrun, Invitation à Jean Sulivan, Éditions du Cerf, 1981.
- Jean Lavoué, Jean Sulivan, je vous écris, Éditions Desclée de Brouwer, 2000
- Collective, Yvon Tranvouez (dir.), Jean Sulivan, L'écriture insurgée, Éditions Apogée, Rennes, 2007
- Eamon Maher, Jean Sulivan, 1913-1980 : la marginalité dans la vie et l'œuvre, L'Harmattan, 2008.
- Franck Delorme, "La parole vive de Jean Sulivan", in Études - revue de culture contemporaine, March 2010.
- Jean Sulivan, une parole d'intériorité pour aujourd'hui, Acts of the symposium in Ploërmel 24 and 25 April 2010, Les Sources et les Livres, 2, rue de la Fontaine, 44410 Assérac.
- Jean Lavoué, Jean Sulivan, la voie nue de l'intériorité, Éditions Golias, Lyon, 2011.
- Bruno Frappat, « Jean Sulivan, contemporain » - sur Jean Sulivan Abécédaire by Charles Austin (November 2010), La Croix, 6 January 2011.

=== Audio-visual documentation ===
- La flûte de Jean Sulivan, film by Patrick Chagnard, broadcast on TF1 18 February 1968, and « La parole inachevée », interview of Jean Sulivan by Marie-Thérèse Maltèse, broadcast on TF1 24 September 1978 - Association des amis de Jean Sulivan, Les Films du Parotier et CFRT, 2006 (DVD).

== Bibliography ==
- Updated bibliography in "Appendices" of Jean Sulivan Abécédaire, edition established and presented by Charles Austin, Gallimard, November 2010 ISBN 978-2-07-013178-5.
