= Yitzhak Quenan =

Israeli politician

Yitzhak Kenan (1942 – October 14, 2021) was an Israeli politician, educator, author, poet and screenwriter, who served as head of the Beit She'an Council from 1974 to 1983.

== Biography ==
Yitzhak Kenan was born in Morocco as Yitzhak (Izhak) and Eknin, and immigrated to Israel in 1952 as part of the youth aliyah. Kenan was educated at the Neve Hadassah Youth Village and Kibbutz Tel Yitzhak. He did his military service in the Nahal ranks, and completed a company commander course in the parachute Nahal. He participated in the Six-Day War, the War of Attrition, and the Yom Kippur War.

Kenan is a graduate of the Nahalal Teachers' Seminary. He worked as a teacher, educator and school principal in the city of Beit Shean, and graduated with a bachelor's degree in history and Hebrew literature from the University of Haifa.

In 1974, he was elected to serve as the head of the Beit She'an council on behalf of the Labor Party. and served in his position for two terms, until 1983.

In 1984 he was sent to France as a "Youth Aliyah" envoy in Western Europe. In 1987 he was appointed Director General of Art for the People, a position he held until 1992.

Between 2001 and 2004, he was sent again to France as an envoy of the Jewish Agency.

Kenan died on October 14, 2021, in Kfar Saba at the age of 79, and was laid to rest in Pardes Haim Cemetery in Kfar Saba. He was the father of four children.

== Work ==
In 1970, Kenan received the first prize for his short story "A Tomb on the Mount of Olives" in the Ministry of Education's "Three Stories" competition.

In the early 1970s, he wrote the lyrics to the song "Yam Shibulim", to the tune of Haim Agmon, for the Beit Shean Singers. The connection between Yam and Shibulim originated from his residence in Kiryat Yam and later in the Beit Shean Valley. The song became famous after it was performed by the Gevatron Band. He also wrote the songs "Emek Sheli", "Pens Shalket", "Brush Shel A'afot" and others.

In 1976, he received the Ministry of Education Award for the short story "A Case in the Case." He later published several novels, a play, and a children's book, "The Magic Snake of Marrakech."

In 1998, he wrote a short screenplay, "Winning Death," which won the Network Award for Excellence. A year later, he wrote a full-length screenplay, "Father Lied."
