= Kafr Sur =

- Municipality type C

Arabic transcription(s)
  - Arabic: كفر صور
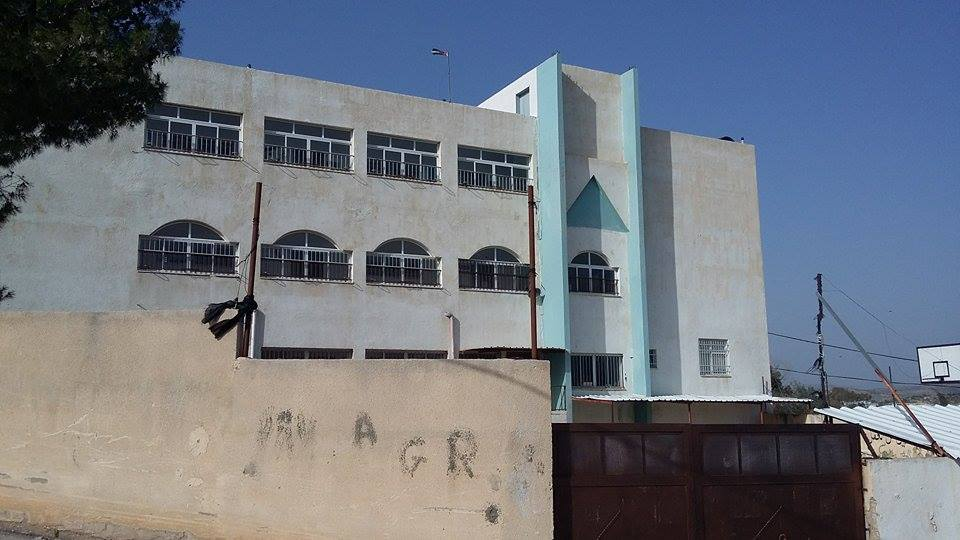
- Elementary school in Kafr Sur

- Location of Kafr Sur within Palestine
- Coordinates: 32°14′38″N 35°03′52″E
- Palestine grid: 156/183
- State: State of Palestine
- Governorate: Tulkarm

Government
  - Type: Municipality

Population (2017)
  - Total: 1,288
- Name meaning: The village of the rock

Kafr Sur (Arabic: كفر صور) is a Palestinian town in the Tulkarm Governorate in the eastern West Bank, located 12 kilometers Southeast of Tulkarm. According to the Palestinian Central Bureau of Statistics, Kafr Sur had a population of approximately 1,254 inhabitants in mid-year 2006, and 1,288 by 2017. 13.5% of the population of Kafr Sur were refugees in 1997.

== History ==
Ceramics from the Byzantine era have been found here.

=== Ottoman era ===
Al-Ras was incorporated into the Ottoman Empire in 1517 with all of Palestine, and in a sijill (royal order) from 941/1535 an unspecified share of the village revenue was given to the waqf for Ribat al-Mansuri in Jerusalem.

In 1596 the village appeared in the tax registers as being in the Nahiya of Bani Sa'b of the Liwa of Nablus. It had a population of 22 households, all Muslim. The villagers paid a fixed tax-rate of 33,3% on various agricultural products, including wheat, barley, summer crops, olive trees, goats and/or beehives in addition to occasional revenues, a press for olive oil or grape syrup, and a fixed tax for people of Nablus area; a total of 6,100 akçe.

In the 16th century, the neighboring village of al-Majdal (near modern Tsur Natan) was listed as inhabited, but it became abandoned before the 19th century, with its land being absorbed by Kafr Sur.

In 1838, Robinson noted Kefr Sur as a village in Beni Sa'ab district, west of Nablus.

In the 1860s, the Ottoman authorities granted the village an agricultural plot of land called Ghabat Kafr Sur in the former confines of the Forest of Arsur (Ar. Al-Ghaba) in the coastal plain, west of the village. During this British Mandate period, this territory developed into a village called Ghabat Kafr Sur.

In 1870/1871 (1288 AH), an Ottoman census listed the village with 139 Household in the nahiya (sub-district) of Bani Sa'b.

In 1882 the PEF's Survey of Western Palestine (SWP) described Kefr Sur as: "A small stone village on a knoll, supplied by cisterns."

Around the turn of the 20th century, Kafr Sur and its Ghaba were areas in which the Hannun Family of Tulkarm/Saffarin owned extensive estates. The Hannuns fostered close ties with the clans inhabiting Kafr Sur.

=== British Mandate era ===
In the 1922 census of Palestine conducted by the British Mandate authorities, Kufr Sur had a population of 271 Muslims, increasing in the 1931 census to 559; 553 Muslims and 6 Christians, living in 128 houses. The 1931 numbers included the Bayarat Hannoun and the Arab el Balawin.

In the 1945 statistics the population of Kafr Sur was 460; 450 Muslims and 10 Christians, with 10,926 dunams of land according to an official land and population survey. Of this, 878 dunams were plantations and irrigable land, 2,644 were used for cereals, while 14 dunams were built-up (urban) land.

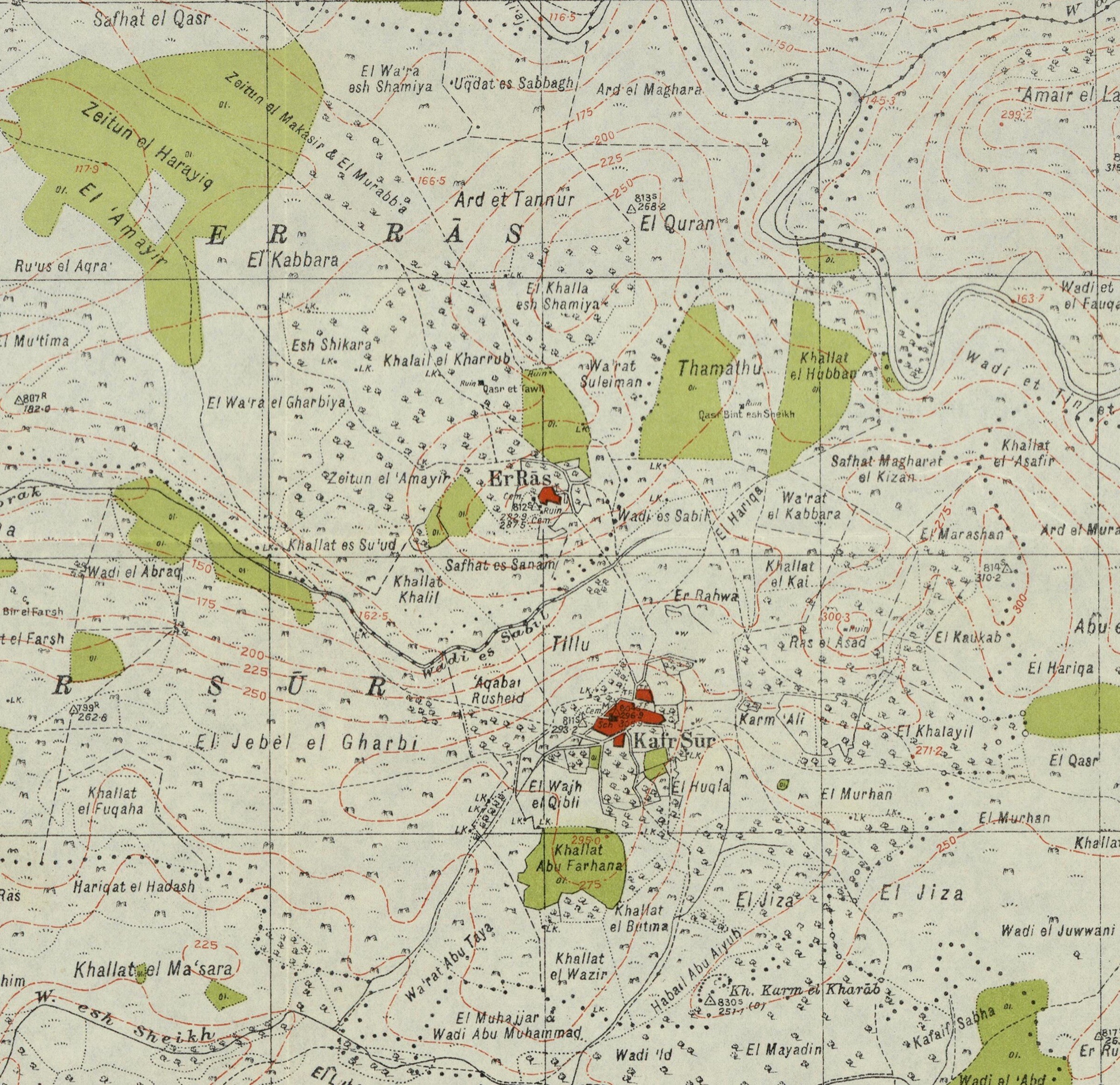
Kafr Sur 1942 1:20,000

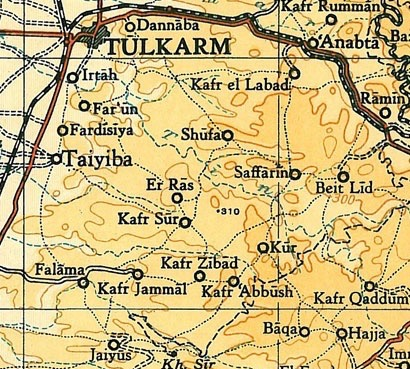
Kafr Sur 1945 1:250,000

=== Jordanian era ===
In the wake of the 1948 Arab–Israeli War, and after the 1949 Armistice Agreements, Kafr Sur came under Jordanian rule.

In 1961, the population of Kafr Sur was 656.

=== Post 1967 ===
Since the Six-Day War in 1967, Kafr Sur has been under Israeli occupation.

== Bibliography ==
- Barron, J.B., ed. (1923). Palestine: Report and General Abstracts of the Census of 1922. Government of Palestine.
- Burgoyne, Michael Hamilton (1987). Mamluk Jerusalem. ISBN 090503533X.
- Conder, C.R.; Kitchener, H.H. (1882). The Survey of Western Palestine: Memoirs of the Topography, Orography, Hydrography, and Archaeology. Vol. 2. London: Committee of the Palestine Exploration Fund.
- Dauphin, C. (1998). La Palestine byzantine, Peuplement et Populations. BAR International Series 726 (in French). Vol. III : Catalogue. Oxford: Archeopress. ISBN 0-860549-05-4.
- Government of Jordan, Department of Statistics (1964). First Census of Population and Housing. Volume I: Final Tables; General Characteristics of the Population (PDF).
- Government of Palestine, Department of Statistics (1945). Village Statistics, April, 1945. Government of Palestine.
- Hadawi, S. (1970). Village Statistics of 1945: A Classification of Land and Area ownership in Palestine. Palestine Liberation Organization Research Center.
- Hütteroth, W.-D.; Abdulfattah, K. (1977). Historical Geography of Palestine, Transjordan and Southern Syria in the Late 16th Century. Erlanger Geographische Arbeiten, Sonderband 5. Erlangen, Germany: Vorstand der Fränkischen Geographischen Gesellschaft. ISBN 3-920405-41-2.
- Mills, E., ed. (1932). Census of Palestine 1931. Population of Villages, Towns and Administrative Areas. Jerusalem: Government of Palestine.
- Palmer, E.H. (1881). The Survey of Western Palestine: Arabic and English Name Lists Collected During the Survey by Lieutenants Conder and Kitchener, R. E. Transliterated and Explained by E.H. Palmer. Committee of the Palestine Exploration Fund.
- Robinson, E.; Smith, E. (1841). Biblical Researches in Palestine, Mount Sinai and Arabia Petraea: A Journal of Travels in the year 1838. Vol. 3. Boston: Crocker & Brewster.
