= Yisrael Katz =

Israeli politician, former Minister of Labour and Social Welfare

- Katz in the 1970s

Ministerial roles
- 1977–1981: Minister of Labor & Social Welfare

Personal details
- Born: 6 December 1927 Vienna, Austria
- Died: 29 October 2010 (aged 82) Jerusalem

Yisrael Katz (Hebrew: ישראל כץ; 6 December 1927 – 29 October 2010) was an Israeli scholar, civil servant and politician who served as Minister of Labor and Social Affairs. He was one of the most influential people in Israel in the creation and development of the Israeli welfare state over several decades.

== Biography ==
Born in Vienna in Austria, Katz emigrated to Mandatory Palestine in November 1938 as a child of ten following the Anschluss and the Nazi rise to power. He arrived in Palestine as part of a Youth Aliyah group of children, which were organized with the consent of parents eager to have their children saved from being arrested and deported to Nazi concentration camps. His parents and sister also succeeded in emigrating to Palestine in the summer of 1939, but were soon expelled to Mauritius, where they lived until 1946, when the family was finally reunited. Part of the extended family was killed in the Holocaust.

Katz originally studied agriculture at the Ahava youth village until 1944, while simultaneously through intense self-study, completing his matriculation in an outstanding manner. As a result, he was awarded a scholarship by the British Mandatory Government but chose to study science at the Hebrew University of Jerusalem from 1946 until 1947. During the course of his studies, he began working on the treatment of delinquent youth in a poor neighborhood of Jerusalem. On the eve of the 1948 Arab–Israeli War, he joined the Israel Defense Forces (IDF) serving in the Intelligence Services.

He returned to the Hebrew University between 1948 and 1949 to study humanities, before joining the Columbia University School of Social Work in New York City in 1951, where he studied psychiatric social work. Upon completion of his qualification at Columbia, he returned to Israel to work as a supervisor of special education for Youth Aliyah, then still an emerging discipline in the newborn State of Israel. He later headed Kiryat Ye'arim Youth Village for distressed youth who were unable to adjust to regular educational frameworks. Between 1959 and 1961, he studied and completed his doctorate in Social Work Administration at Case Western Reserve University in Cleveland, Ohio.

== Dean of School of Social Work at the Hebrew University ==
Upon returning to Israel in 1962, he dedicated his efforts to the establishment of the social work profession in Israel. He became the first Israeli dean of the Paul Baerwald School of Social Work at the Hebrew University, which was the first university-affiliated school of social work in Israel. He held this position until 1968, during which time schools of social work were also established at Haifa and Tel Aviv universities with the support of the Paul Baerwald School. Katz headed a pivotal government committee to determine "the minimal needs of those dependent on social welfare", though Welfare Minister Yosef Burg stopped the work of the committee in 1966, before it presented its conclusions. At the invitation of David Ben-Gurion, he also served as an advisor to the Rafi party on social matters between 1965 and 1967.

During his term at the Paul Baerwald School, Katz became acquainted with the acclaimed Professor Richard Titmuss of the London School of Economics. It was a meeting of tremendous importance bringing about Katz's firm devotion in his own work to Titmuss' discipline and vision.

== Director General of the National Insurance Institute ==
In 1968, Katz was appointed Director-General of the National Insurance Institute (NII) where he served until 1973. During his tenure, several laws were enacted and implemented including child benefit and compensation for Veterans of the IDF and their families, unemployment insurance, general disability insurance, the indexation of Old Age and Survivors' Benefits to average wages rather than to the cost-of-living index. Katz also prepared the groundwork for research in social security matters, particularly on the measurement of poverty in Israel, which continue to be published yearly to this day.

Katz was charged for his criticism of government policies and stance on the problem of poverty several times during his tenure in NII for not being loyal to the government, as well as for inciting social tension.

In 1971, a series of violent demonstrations in Jerusalem conducted by the Israeli Black Panthers movement forced government to discuss seriously the Panthers' claims and a public committee was established to seek solutions. Prime Minister Golda Meir appointed Katz to head the commission, mandated as the "Prime Minister's Commission on Children and Youth in Distress" (Katz Committee). Two years later, with an unprecedented panel of 120 participants from academia, services and various government bodies, the Committee presented its conclusions, recommending that families whose income was lower than the necessary minimum for subsistence, receive a state grant to complete their income. It further recommended the broadening of informal education and the support of deprived areas and more.

== Minister of Labor and Social Affairs ==
In 1973, Katz was elected to the Knesset on the Labor Party list, but gave up his seat before the Knesset opened in order to establish the Brookdale Institute of Gerontology to research ageing in Israel. In 1977, he joined the Democratic Movement for Change. The party joined the first government of Menachem Begin, and despite not being a member of the Knesset, Katz was appointed Minister of Labor and Welfare. During his tenure, Katz took it upon himself to form a mechanism to preserve the value of NII grants from erosion from the rapid inflation affecting Israel at the time. He also directed Knesset legislation which transferred financial funding to the needy from the welfare offices to the NII (Income Maintenance Bill), as well as the law of nursing insurance which granted funding to pensioners in need of nursing care monetary or physical assistance. He was also among the initiators and first activists of the project for the rehabilitation of neighborhoods. He felt that the emphasis of the project should be on social change and not on rehabilitation of structures. However, his position on this issue was not accepted. Katz served as Minister of Labor and Social Affairs until the end of the Government's term of office on 5 August 1981.

== After government ==
In 1982, Katz initiated and headed until 1992 the Center for Social Policy Studies in Israel, now the Taub Center, an independent non-profit "think tank" whose purpose was to influence the composition of social policy of Israel according to the values of social equality and justice.

Katz served as Chairman of the Board of the "Volunteer Center of Israel" from 1986 until 1989, and of the "Voluntary and Nonprofit Sector" – a roof organization of the Volunteer Center and other nonprofit organizations between 1988 and 1989. During the 1980s and 1990s, he served as a trustee and member of the board of several nonprofit sector organizations and worked for the establishment of groundwork for research on the third sector and its role in the modern welfare state.

In November 1996, Katz was appointed to head a commission to examine broad legislation on the subject of rights of people with disabilities. This commission found that more than 10% of Israel's inhabitants suffered from discrimination, injustice and social and financial inferiority. The commission proposed detailed legislation that led to the enactment of the law of equal rights for people with disabilities.

Katz's consistent struggles for a welfare state were most often against the tide in Israeli politics, both in the days of the Labor government and the Likud government.

Over the years, Katz also served as an advisor to various world organizations, including in Singapore, the United States and Kenya.

Katz was married to Marsel Katz, née Ruso, with whom he had two sons. He died on 29 October 2010.
