= Usumain Baraka =

Darfuri activist (born 1994)

Usumain Tukuny Baraka
- Born: 15 November 1994 (age 31); Darfur, Republic of Sudan
- Education: Interdisciplinary Center Herzliya
- Occupations: Activist for international and Israeli Darfuri community

Usumain Tukuny Baraka is a Sudanese activist and asylum seeker living in Israel. He is a leader of Israel's asylum-seeking community and the first Darfuri refugee to graduate from a Hebrew-language program in an Israeli university.

== Biography ==
Usumain Baraka was born in Darfur, Sudan in the small village of Dirata, close to the city of Geneina. He is a member of the Masalit people. At age 9, the Darfur genocide came to his village, and Janjaweed militants killed his father—the leader of his village—and brother. Baraka fled on foot through the jungle and found shelter in a refugee camp in Chad with his mother and sisters.

After three years in the refugee camp, Baraka left in search of a normal life and education, He traveled through Libya and Egypt. In Egypt, he saw a television program on the history of the Jewish people and the Holocaust. In 2008, he paid Bedouin smugglers to take him across the desert into Israel. Upon reaching Israel, he had no shoes. The first Israeli soldier he encountered took off his own shoes and socks and gave them to Baraka.

Baraka submitted an asylum application in 2013, and received humanitarian temporary residency status.

In December 2020, Baraka's brother Sayid Ismael Baraka, who had received American citizenship after being resettled there as a refugee, traveled to El-Geneina, Sudan, to visit family. He was murdered inside his own home by violent militias on January 16, 2021.

== Education and national service ==
Baraka received his high school diploma from Yemin Orde, a Jewish boarding school for at-risk and immigrant youth near Haifa, Israel. After completing high school, Baraka hoped to enlist in the Israel Defense Forces, but was prevented due to his lack of Israeli citizenship. Instead, he completed a year and a half of volunteer service. He frequently returns to Yemin Orde to give inspirational talks to current students.

Baraka graduated from the Interdisciplinary Center Herzliya in 2019 with a bachelor's degree in Government and Diplomacy Relations. After completing his bachelor's degree, he enrolled in a Master's program in Public Policy, also at the IDC and graduated in summer 2020. During his first degree he was a volunteer member of the IDC student union. Baraka completed his studies in Hebrew, one of five languages he speaks, and is the first refugee in Israel to gain a master's degree in Hebrew.

Baraka co-authored the paper "‘She Died While Missing Us’: Experiences of Family Separation Among African Refugees in Israel" along with Dr. Hadas Yaron Mesgena, published in the book Forced Migration and Separated Families: Everyday Insecurities and Transnational Strategies.

== Political activism ==
Baraka is a Co-Founder of the African Students Organization in Israel. From 2016 to 2019 he served as the organisation's Education Director, and took over as the CEO in January 2019. In 2019 he gave a keynote address at the organization's inaugural annual conference.

Baraka makes frequent appearances on Israeli television, radio, and print media, where he represents the asylum-seeking community. He appeared on Kan 11 February 2020 following Benjamin Netanyahu's meeting in Uganda with Abdel Fattah al-Burhan. He appeared on 103fm and in Haaretz in August 2020 following an announcement that Israel and Sudan were undergoing peace talks. He was also featured on an episode of the Israeli television series 'Slicha al hashe'ela' or Excuse the Question, which discussed African asylum seekers in Israel. In April 2020, he was the subject of a Kan 11 mini-documentary, which described his activism to help fellow asylum seekers in Israel during the Coronavirus pandemic.

Baraka also gives tours and lectures to groups in English and Hebrew on the topic of asylum seekers in Israel, the Darfur genocide, and South Tel Aviv. He also runs a Hebrew language school for fellow asylum seekers in Israel, through which he teaches Hebrew to dozens of asylum seekers from Darfur and elsewhere.

On June 28, 2017, Baraka spoke to the Israeli Knesset on behalf of asylum seekers in Israel.

Following his brother's murder in 2021, Baraka spoke out about the dangers presented by Sudan's interim government, run by perpetrators of the genocide in 2003. He both spoke to other journalists and authored an op-ed on the subject, published in Israel's Haaretz newspaper.
