= Ghabat Kafr Sur =

Ghabat Kafr Sur غابات كفر صور
- Village
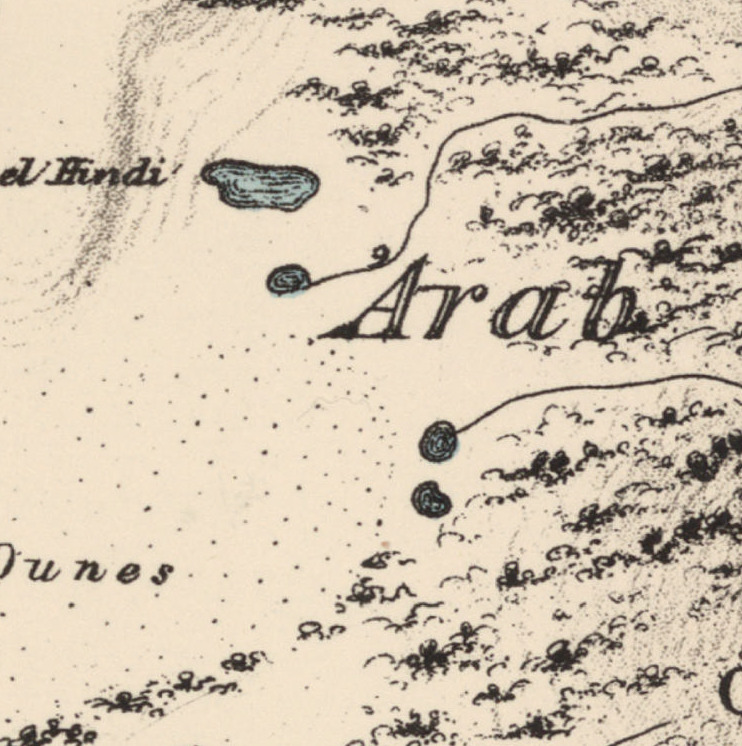
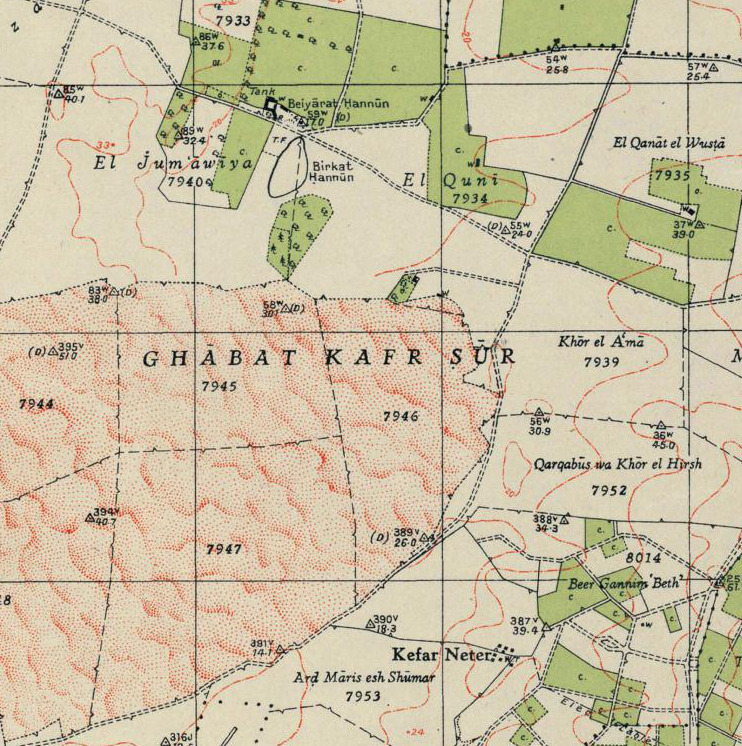
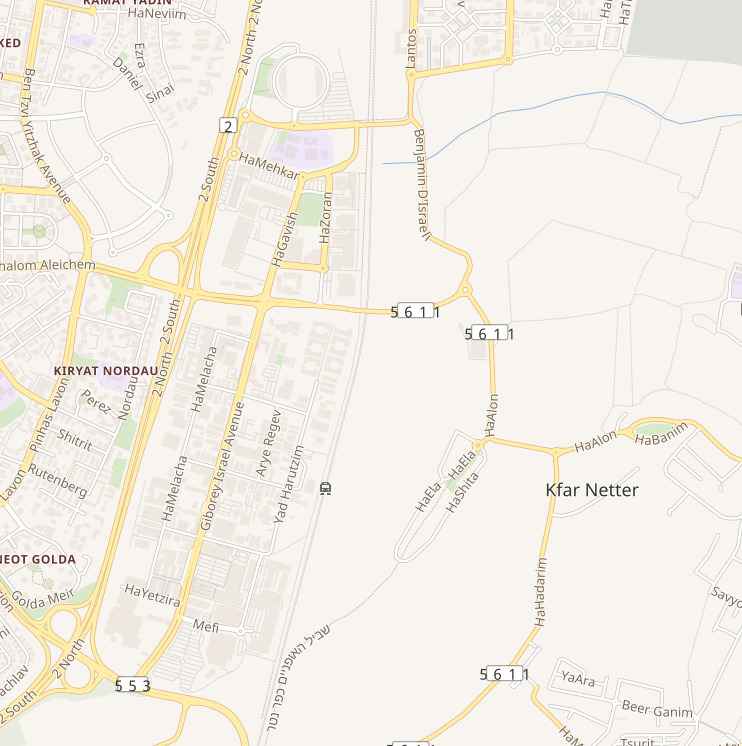
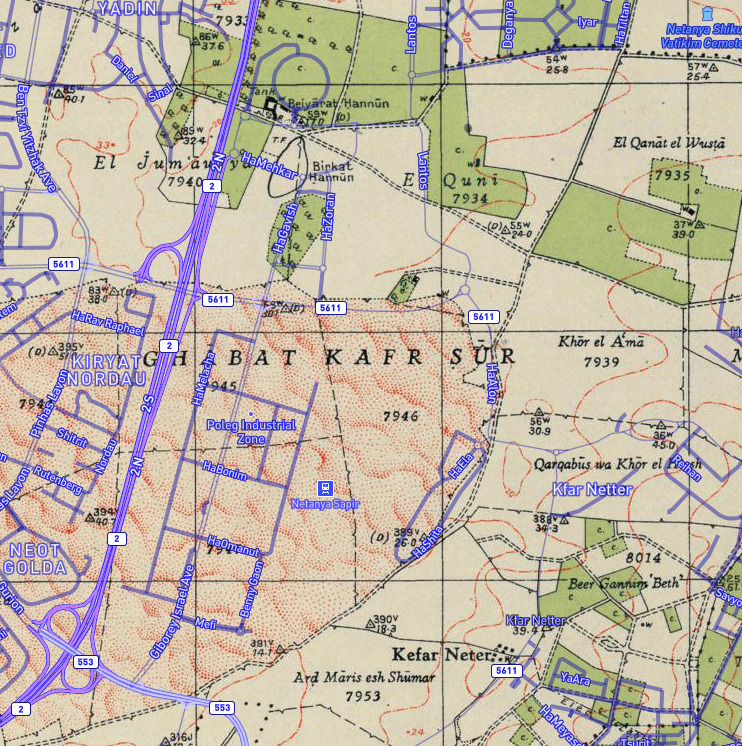
- 1870s map 1940s map modern map 1940s with modern overlay map A series of historical maps of the area around Ghabat Kafr Sur (click the buttons)

- Location within Mandatory Palestine
- Coordinates: 32°17′02″N 34°52′03″E
- Palestine grid: 137/187
- Geopolitical entity: Mandatory Palestine
- Subdistrict: Tulkarm
- Date of depopulation: before 15 May 1948

Area
  - Total: 19,666 dunams (19.666 km^{2}; 7.593 sq mi)

Population (1945)
  - Total: 740
- Current Localities: Beit Yehoshua, Kfar Neter, Tel Yitzhaq

Ghabat Kafr Sur was a Palestinian village in the Tulkarm Subdistrict of Mandatory Palestine. It was depopulated during the 1948 Arab–Israeli War on May 15, 1948, under Operation Coastal Clearing. It was located 16 km southwest of Tulkarm.

== History ==
The village was located on what had been the large Arsuf forest. In the 1860s, the Ottoman authorities granted residents of Kafr Sur an agricultural plot of land in the former confines of the Forest of Arsur (Ar. Al-Ghaba) in the coastal plain, west of the village. After being cleared by villagers from Kafr Sur, they gradually took up residence there.

=== British Mandate era ===
In the 1931 census of Palestine, Ghabat Kafr Sur was counted with nearby Bayyarat Hannun and 'Arab al-Balawina. Together they had a population of 559: 6 Christians and 553 Muslims in a total of 128 houses.

In 1932, two Jewish settlements were established on lands purchased from Ghabat Kafr Sur, and named Kfar Tzur and Tel Tzur after the original village. Kfar Tzur was renamed into Be'er Ganim in 1933. Those two settlements were merged into Even Yehuda in 1950.

In the 1945 statistics, Ghabat Kafr Sur had a population of 740 Muslims, while the nearby Beit Yehoshua, Kfar Neter, and Tel Yitzhaq had a total of 390 Jews. Together they had a total of 19,666 dunams of land, of which 4,506 were privately owned by Arabs and 10,384 by Jews. Of this, Arabs used a total of 1,333 dunams for citrus and bananas, 42 dunams were plantations and irrigated land, 2,700 dunums were for cereal, while a total of 6,474 dunams were classified as “non-cultivable” areas.

=== Aftermath of the 1948 Arab–Israeli War ===
The majority of Ghabat Kafr Sur was razed during coastal clearing operations carried out by the Zionist militia group Haganah, which demolished a number of localities along the Mediterranean coast. One survivor, Salim Abu Sayef, recounts the death of his uncle's wife at the hands of Zionists. The villagers fled to Al-Tira, and stayed there until the Zionist forces forced them all out.

When the Jews attacked Al-Tira, we fled to Qalqilya. We were not allowed to carry guns. So we had nothing with which to defend ourselves. [The Jews] were shooting at us from both sides, and the Jews’ [massacre] at Dayr Yasin.... made us leave.

We stayed at Tirah Bani Sa’ab for more than a week, until the Jews attacked. The village fought bravely, but in the end nobody could fight tanks and planes with guns.

The Jews followed us to Qalqilya and blew up the school with mines. Many people were killed there. We kept going from village to village......Nobody could return after that to the village [Ghabat Kafr Sur], because the Jews settled there in mobile houses transferred by tractors. We walked barefoot and hungry from village to village...Fearful stories about massacres made people run away.

Rosemarie Esber lists the cause of depopulation under: "Direct mortar attacks on civilians, siege, shooting at fleeing Arabs."

In 1992, the remains of Ghabat Kafr Sur were described, "a considerable portion of the site consists of sand dunes overgrown with wild vegetation. Several large eucalyptus trees also grow on the site. The remains of three large Arab houses are visible in the midst of newly planted orange groves in the east and northeastern part of the site. They are used by the Israelis as agricultural warehouses."

== Bibliography ==
- Department of Statistics (1945). Village Statistics, April, 1945. Government of Palestine.
- Esber, R.M. (2008). Under the Cover of War, The Zionist Expulsions of the Palestinians. Arabicus Books & Media. ISBN 978-0981513171.
- Hadawi, S. (1970). Village Statistics of 1945: A Classification of Land and Area ownership in Palestine. Palestine Liberation Organization Research Center.
- Khalidi, W. (1992). All That Remains: The Palestinian Villages Occupied and Depopulated by Israel in 1948. Washington D.C.: Institute for Palestine Studies. ISBN 0-88728-224-5.
- Mills, E., ed. (1932). Census of Palestine 1931. Population of Villages, Towns and Administrative Areas. Jerusalem: Government of Palestine.
