= Sarah (Wolf) Goodman =

Jewish philanthropist from Indiana

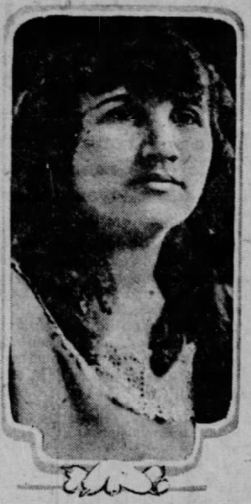
- Born: Sarah Wolf; March 25, 1886; Vienna, Austria
- Died: November 4, 1975 (aged 89); Indianapolis, Indiana
- Occupation: Philanthropist
- Organization: United Jewish Appeal
- Spouse: Jacob A. Goodman
- Children: Robert A. Goodman Ruth Elaine Goodman Jackie Goodman

Sarah (Wolf) Goodman (March 25, 1886 – November 4, 1975) was the first woman to hold the position of president of a Jewish Federation organization in the United States, a patron of the arts, and philanthropist for Jewish organizations.

== Life ==
Sarah Wolf was born March 25, 1886, in Vienna, Austria. Her family moved to the United States and settled in Ashland, Kentucky. She attended and graduated from St. Louis Teachers College. After graduating she taught kindergarten. She moved to Indianapolis in 1924 after marrying Jack Goodman, the founder of the Real Silk Hosiery Mills. The couple had 3 kids, and three grandchildren. Sarah's daughter-in-law, Donna Goodman, recalled that the family was wealthy, lived in a large house, and had five or six servants. The family was also known for its love of music. Soloists for the Indianapolis symphony, including Isaac Stern, would sometimes stay at the family's house. The family also hosted other notable figures, including the first Jewish faculty member of Dartmouth College and Golda Meir.

Goodman was a member of the Indianapolis Hebrew Congregation. She was a trustee for the congregation and also a member of the National Council of Jewish Women.

== Career ==
In Indianapolis, Goodman was an active member of cultural organizations, including the Matinee Musicale, the Booth Tarkington Civic Theatre, the Kirshbaum Community Center, the Woman's Committee of the Indiana State Symphony Society, and the Symphony Society Board. Beginning in 1926 she led arts programming at Kirshbaum Community Center (now known as JCC Indianapolis). The Center hired an orchestra that eventually became the Indianapolis Symphony Orchestra. Goodman also co-founded the Ensemble Music Society and the Aspen Scholarship Association.

In addition to her work with symphonies, Goodman was an active philanthropist for Jewish children. In 1938 she raised $750 (during the Great Depression) for the Youth Aliyah organization to save two children from Nazi persecution in Austria. To raise the money, Goodman wrote letters for the Jewish Post and Opinion encouraging families of graduates to send donations to relocate Jewish children from Austria to Palestine. Donors did not receive a gift, but Goodman sent them cards of appreciation. Goodman's approach to raising funds spread to other cities, including Cincinnati, Nashville, Memphis, Miami, New Orleans, Los Angeles, Seattle, and Washington D.C. The Youth Aliyah fund saved a thousand children.

She served as the chairman of the Women's Division of the national organization of the United Jewish Appeal and raised money for its National Committee on Youth. In honoring her work as a philanthropist, the B'nai B'rith and the Indianapolis Community Chest named her the Woman of the Year in 1956. The Jewish Post described her as "the most prominent Jewish woman in the state" and in 1956 named her the Jewish "Man of the Year."

She also served as the national vice president of Hadassah and was a board member for 18 years.

== Legacy ==
Goodman was the first woman to serve as president of a Jewish Federation organization in the United States. From 1953 to 1954 she was the president of the Jewish Federation of Greater Indianapolis. At the time of her death, she was the only woman to have held that role.

Her work in supporting music organizations helped to further the growth of the Indianapolis Symphony Orchestra. Following her death, the Jerusalem Music Center established a garden in her memory and noted her service as the National Chair of the Women's Division of the United Jewish Appeal.

In a remembrance of her life, The Jewish Post observed that she was "a staunch Zionist."

The Indianapolis Hebrew Congregation maintains an award in recognition of student creativity and artistic achievement in her name.

In reflecting on her life, Goodman, the recipient of an award from the National Conference of Christians and Jews, observed: "Anything one does that helps in any way to make the life of another more livable is the greatest reward one can reap. My interest is in the dignity of man – regardless of his denomination."
