= Yemin Orde =

Coordinates: 33°06′N 35°33′E

- ימין אורד
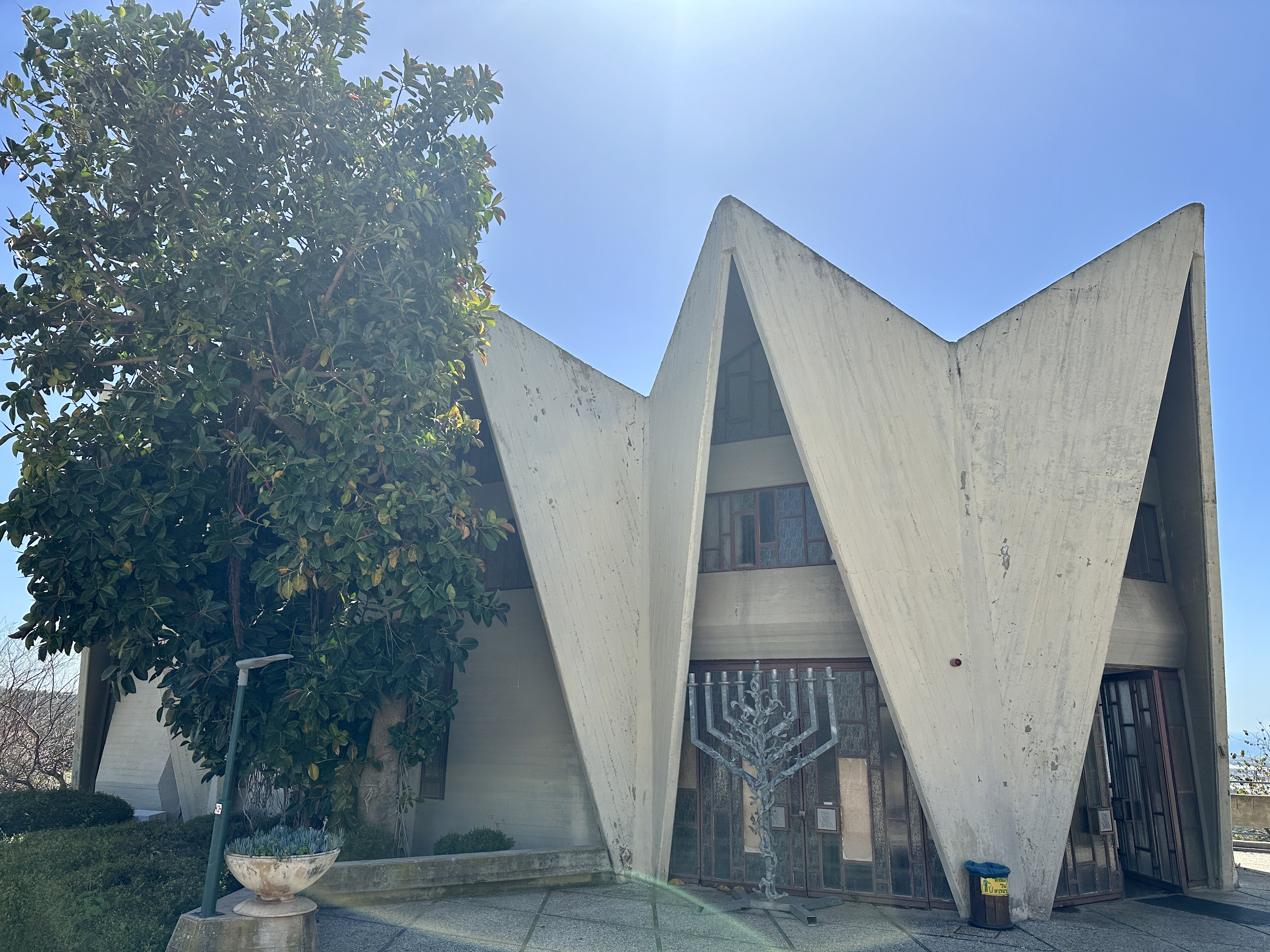
- Mt. Carmel; Israel

Information
- School type: Youth Village
- Religious affiliation: Jewish
- Established: 1953
- Grades: 9–12
- Enrollment: 400+
- Campus size: 77 acres

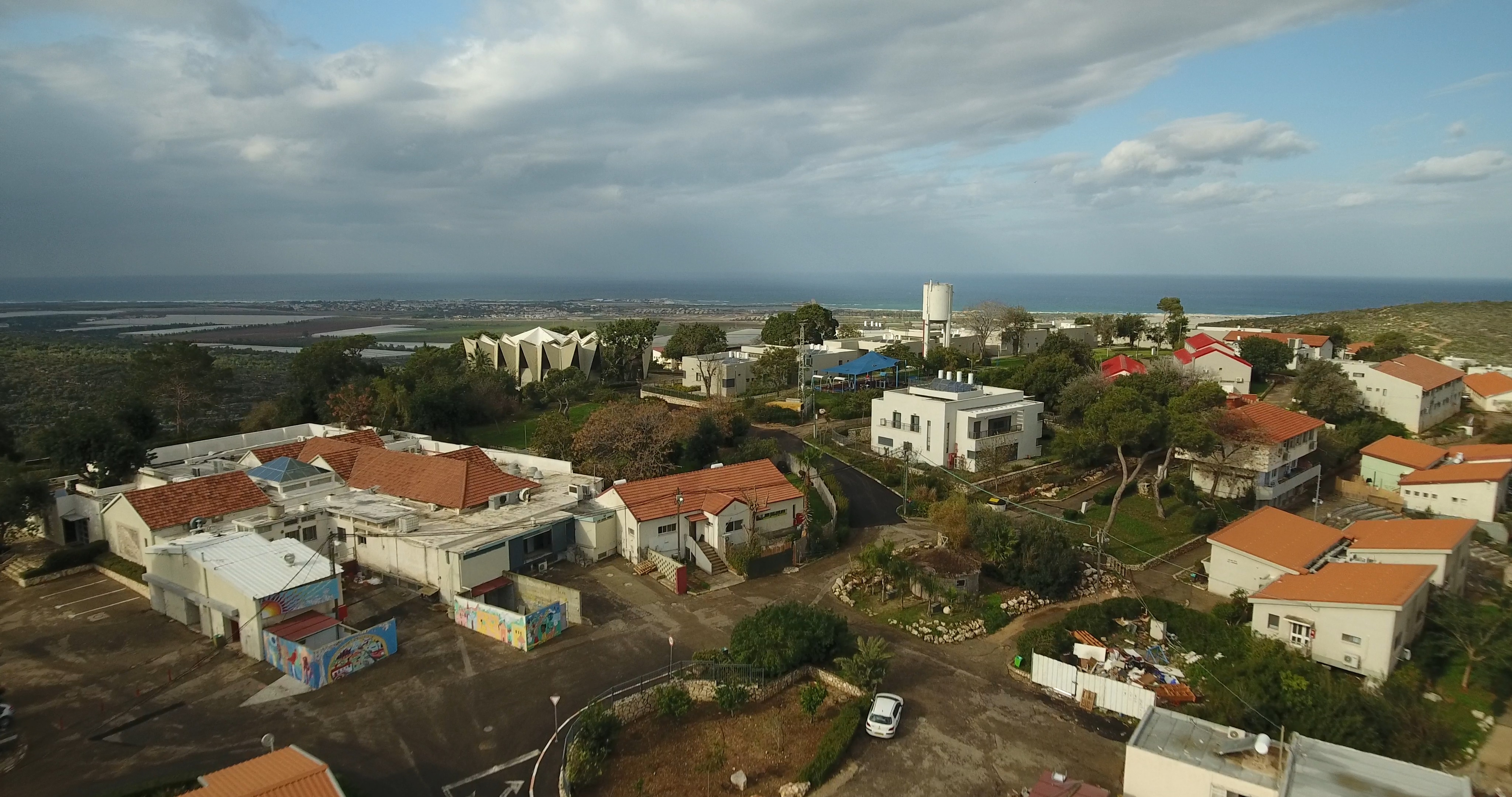
Yemin Orde

Yemin Orde Youth Village (Hebrew: ימין אורד) (Lit: "Orde Memorial") is an acclaimed youth village near Haifa, Israel for at-risk youth, that delivers an all-encompassing school and home within a 24/7 framework; providing each student with the individual, peer and familial environment and support needed to succeed.

== History ==
Yemin Orde Youth Village was established in 1953 by the British Friends of Youth Aliyah. The name was given to commemorate British Major General Orde Charles Wingate, an ardent supporter of the Zionist cause and instrumental in the formation of the Israel Defense Forces. The village provides a safe haven for immigrant and at-risk teens from around the world.

== Methodology ==
Yemin Orde is the birthplace of a unique teaching methodology known as the Village Way. Founded by Dr. Chaim Peri, Director Emeritus of Yemin Orde Youth Village and Founder of Village Way Educational Initiatives, the Village Way is based on the core philosophy of "it takes a Village to raise a child." The Village Way is composed of 10 core components that educators and staff at Yemin Orde use to work with at-risk teens.

A youth village patterned after the Israeli model was established in Rwanda.

== Notable alumni ==
- Usumain Baraka

== See also ==
- Education in Israel
