= Beit Yehoshua =

Moshav in central Israel

Beit Yehoshua: בֵּית יְהוֹשֻעַ (Hebrew)
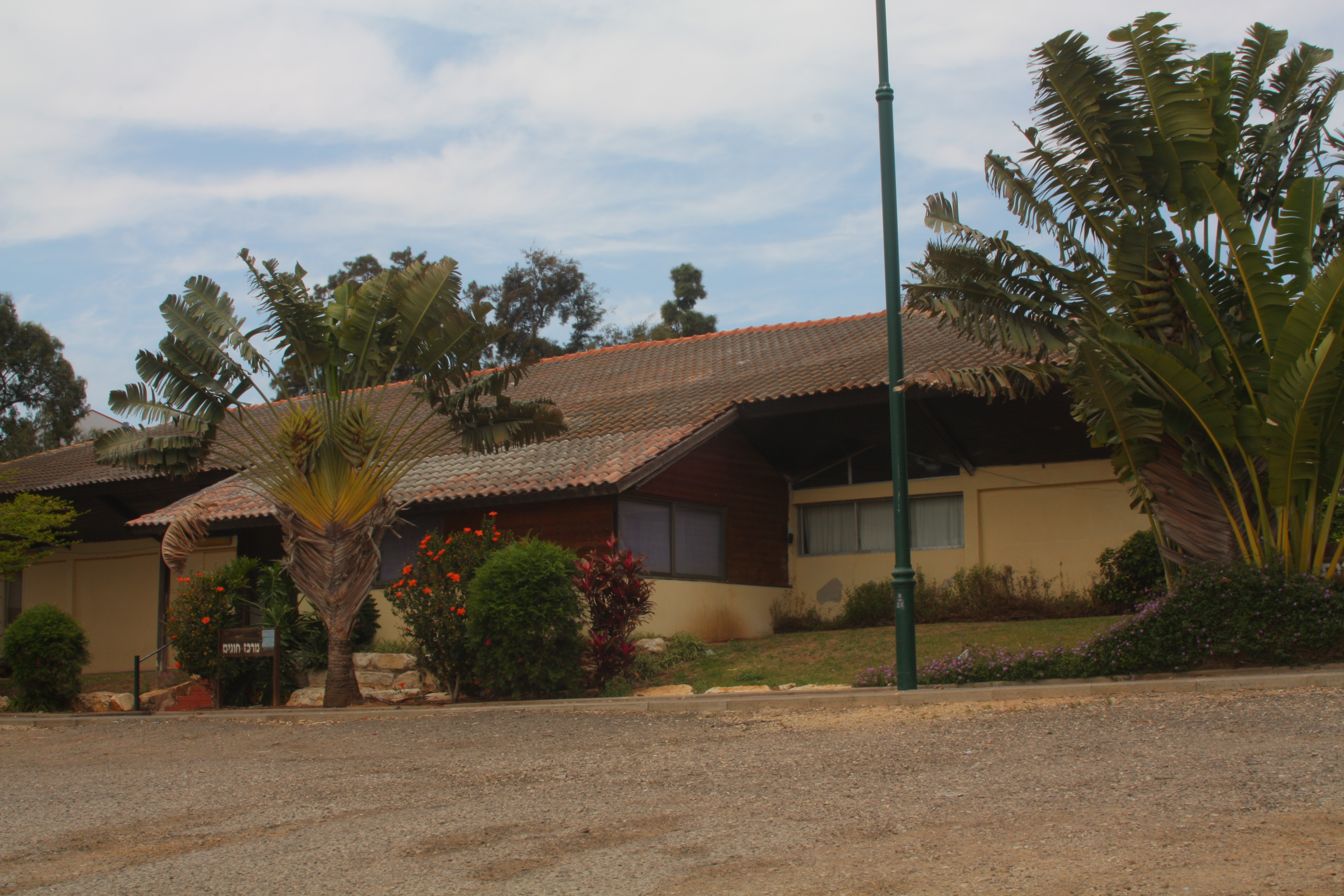
- Village office
- Etymology: House of Joshua
- Location within Central Israel Location within Israel
- Coordinates: 32°15′40″N 34°51′47″E
- Country: Israel
- District: Central
- Subdistrict: HaSharon
- Council: Hof HaSharon
- Affiliation: HaOved HaTzioni
- Founded: 17 August 1938
- Founder: Akiva and HaNoar HaTzioni members
- Population (2024): 1,107
- Website: www.beit-yehoshua.muni.il

Beit Yehoshua (Hebrew: בֵּית יְהוֹשֻעַ, lit. 'House of Joshua') is a moshav in central Israel. Located in the coastal plain near Netanya, it falls under the jurisdiction of Hof HaSharon Regional Council. In 2024 it had a population of 1,107. The Beit Yehoshua Railway Station is adjacent to the moshav.

== History ==
The region of Beit Yehoshua has been inhabited intermittently since the Middle Paleolithic age, with peak periods of settlement during the Byzantine (4th–7th centuries CE) and Late Ottoman periods (19th–early 20th centuries CE). Before the 20th century the area formed part of the Forest of Sharon and was part of the lands of the village of Ghabat Kafr Sur. It was an open woodland dominated by Mount Tabor Oak, which extended from Kfar Yona in the north to Ra'anana in the south. The local Arab inhabitants traditionally used the area for pasture, firewood and intermittent cultivation. The intensification of settlement and agriculture in the coastal plain during the 19th century led to deforestation and subsequent environmental degradation.

The village was established as a kibbutz on 17 August 1938 by gar'in of the Akiva and HaNoar HaTzioni movements as part of the tower and stockade settlement programme. According to the Jewish National Fund, the original settlers were orthodox and were engaged in intensive farming and citrus. It was named after Yehoshua (Ozjasz) Thon, a Galician Zionist leader. By 1947 it had a population of about 150. .

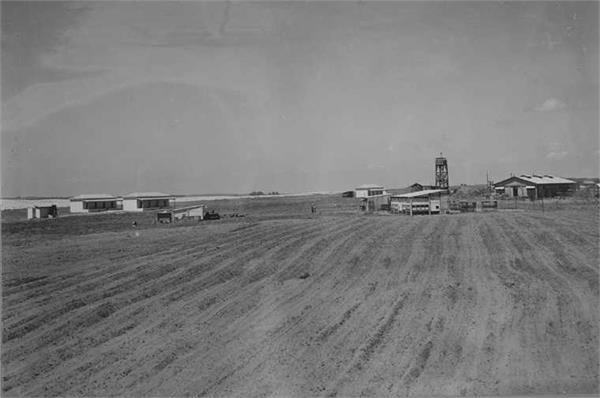
Beit Yehoshua 1939

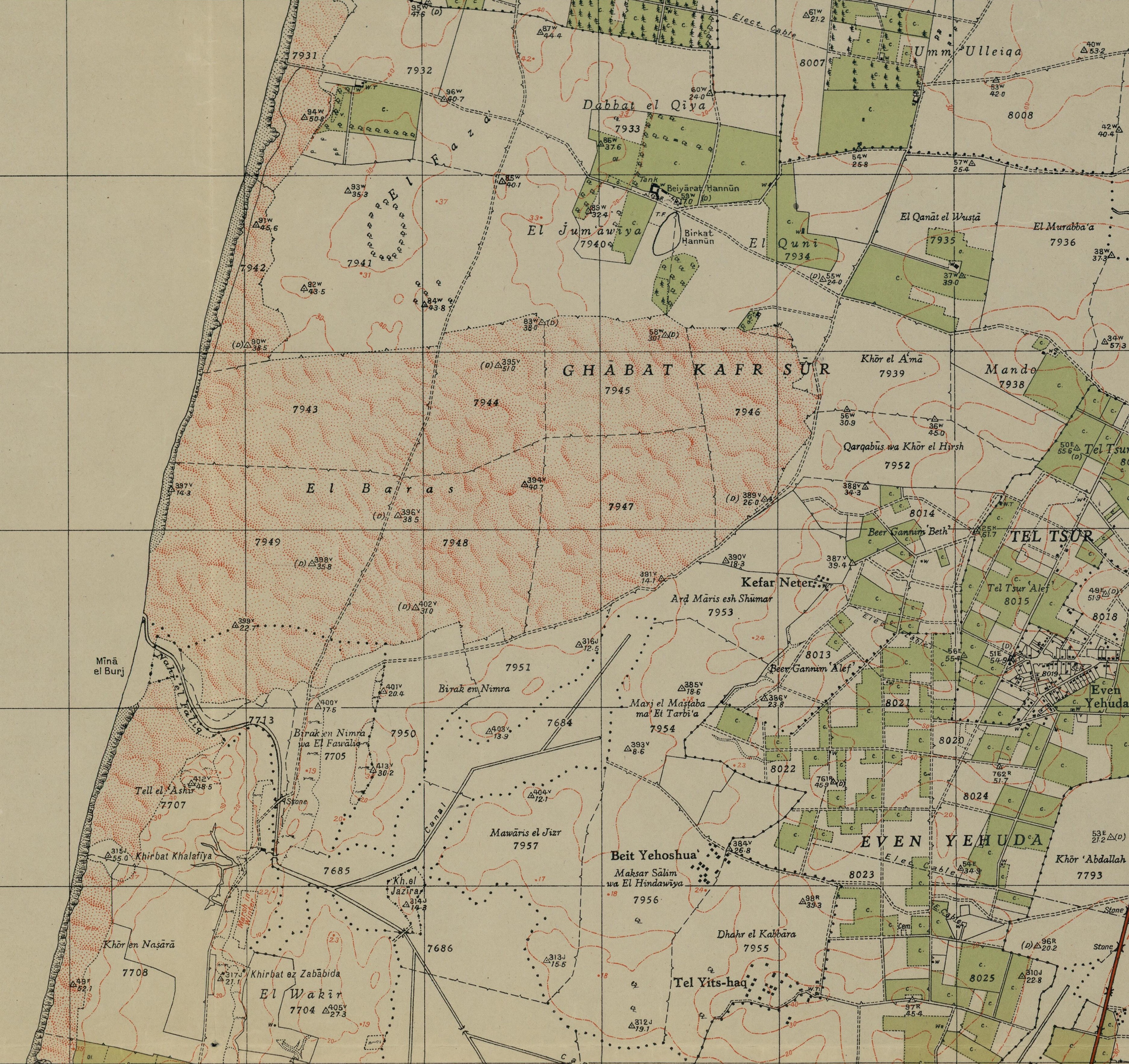
Beit Yehoshua 1944 (lower right quadrant)

Aerial view of Beit Yehoshua
