= Saffarin =

- Municipality type D (Village council)

Arabic transcription(s)
  - Arabic: سفارين
- Location of Saffarin within Palestine
- Coordinates: 32°15′43″N 35°06′39″E
- Palestine grid: 160/185
- State: State of Palestine
- Governorate: Tulkarm

Government
  - Type: Village council

Population (2017)
  - Total: 754
- Name meaning: Sefarin, from personal name

Saffarin (Arabic: سفارين) is a Palestinian village in the western West Bank, in the Tulkarm Governorate of the State of Palestine, located 11 kilometers South-east of Tulkarm. According to the Palestinian Central Bureau of Statistics, Saffarin had a population of about 1,037 inhabitants in mid-year 2006 and 754 by 2017. 9.8% of the population of Saffarin were refugees in 1997. The healthcare facilities for Saffarin are designated as MOH level 2.

== History ==
Saffarin has been identified with the Israelite village of Sepher, which was mentioned in one of the Samaria Ostraca.

Ceramics from the Byzantine era have been found here.

During the Crusader period, Diya' al-Din (1173–1245) writes that there was a Muslim population in the Saffarin.

=== Ottoman era ===
Saffarin, like all of Palestine was incorporated into the Ottoman Empire in 1517. In the 1596 tax registers, part of the nahiya ("subdistrict") of Jabal Sami, part of the larger Sanjak of Nablus. It had a population of 8 households, all Muslims. The inhabitants paid a fixed tax rate of 33.3% on agricultural products, including wheat, barley, summer crops, olive trees, goats and beehives, in addition to occasional revenues and a press for olive oil or grape syrup, and a fixed tax for people of Nablus area; a total of 9,167 akçe. 3/24 of the revenue went to the Waqf Halil ar-Rahman.

During the 18th century, a group of Transjordanian Huwaytat Arabs, settled in the village. The newcomers formed several families, including the Dar Hasan hamula, cmprised of the Hannun, Salih, Abu Dhiyab, ‘Ali Abu Bakr, and Samara families. In the middle of the 19th century, the Hannun and Samara families moved to Tulkarm together with other families of Saffarin. Later on, members of the Hannun family established the plantation/village of Bayyarat Hannun near the coastal city of Netanya, and would serve as mayors of Tulkarm for most of the 20th century.

During the middle of the 19th century, Muslim fellahin from Saffarin settled in neighboring Far'un, displacing Far'un's original Christian inhabitants.

In 1870 Victor Guérin noted it as a village of 600 persons.

In 1870/1871 (1288 AH), an Ottoman census listed the village in the nahiya (sub-district) of Wadi al-Sha'ir.

In 1882 the PEF's Survey of Western Palestine (SWP) described Sefarin as: "a small village on a knoll, upon a ridge, supplied by cisterns, with a few olive trees."

Around the turn of the 20th century, Saffarin was one of the villages in which the Hannun family owned extensive estates. The Hannuns fostered close ties with the clans inhabiting the village.

=== British Mandate era ===
In the 1922 census of Palestine conducted by the British Mandate authorities, Sufarin had a population of 458 Muslims, increasing in the 1931 census to 444 Muslims, living in 100 houses.

In the 1945 statistics the population of Saffarin was 530 Muslims, with 9,687 dunams of land according to an official land and population survey. Of this, 1,624 dunams were used plantations and irrigable land, 1,384 for cereals, while 13 dunams were built-up (urban) land.

=== Jordanian era ===
In the wake of the 1948 Arab–Israeli War, and after the 1949 Armistice Agreements, Saffarin came under Jordanian rule.

In 1961, the population was 616.

=== Post 1967 ===
Since the Six-Day War in 1967, Saffarin has been under Israeli oppressive occupation.

== Bibliography ==
- Barron, J.B., ed. (1923). Palestine: Report and General Abstracts of the Census of 1922. Government of Palestine.
- Conder, C.R.; Kitchener, H.H. (1882). The Survey of Western Palestine: Memoirs of the Topography, Orography, Hydrography, and Archaeology. Vol. 2. London: Committee of the Palestine Exploration Fund.
- Dauphin, C. (1998). La Palestine byzantine, Peuplement et Populations. BAR International Series 726 (in French). Vol. III : Catalogue. Oxford: Archeopress. ISBN 0-860549-05-4.
- Government of Jordan, Department of Statistics (1964). First Census of Population and Housing. Volume I: Final Tables; General Characteristics of the Population (PDF).
- Government of Palestine, Department of Statistics (1945). Village Statistics, April, 1945.
- Guérin, V. (1875). Description Géographique Historique et Archéologique de la Palestine (in French). Vol. 2: Samarie, pt. 2. Paris: L'Imprimerie Nationale.
- Hadawi, S. (1970). Village Statistics of 1945: A Classification of Land and Area ownership in Palestine. Palestine Liberation Organization Research Center.
- Hütteroth, W.-D.; Abdulfattah, K. (1977). Historical Geography of Palestine, Transjordan and Southern Syria in the Late 16th Century. Erlanger Geographische Arbeiten, Sonderband 5. Erlangen, Germany: Vorstand der Fränkischen Geographischen Gesellschaft. ISBN 3-920405-41-2.
- Mills, E., ed. (1932). Census of Palestine 1931. Population of Villages, Towns and Administrative Areas. Jerusalem: Government of Palestine.
- Palmer, E.H. (1881). The Survey of Western Palestine: Arabic and English Name Lists Collected During the Survey by Lieutenants Conder and Kitchener, R. E. Transliterated and Explained by E.H. Palmer. Committee of the Palestine Exploration Fund.
- Talmon-Heller, Daniella (1994). "Popular Hanbalite Islam in 12th–13th Century Jabal Nablus and Jabal Qasyūn". Studia Islamica. 79: 103–120. doi:10.2307/1595838. JSTOR 1595838.
- Talmon-Heller, Daniella (2002). Riley-Smith, J. (ed.). The Cited Tales of the Wondrous Doings of the Shaykhs of the Holy Land. Vol. 1. published in Crusades. Aldershot, Hampshire: Published by Ashgate for the Society for the Study of the Crusades and the Latin East. pp. 111–154. ISBN 0754609189.
