= Even Yehuda =

Even Yehuda: אֶבֶן יְהוּדָה; ايفن يهودا
- Local council (from 1950)
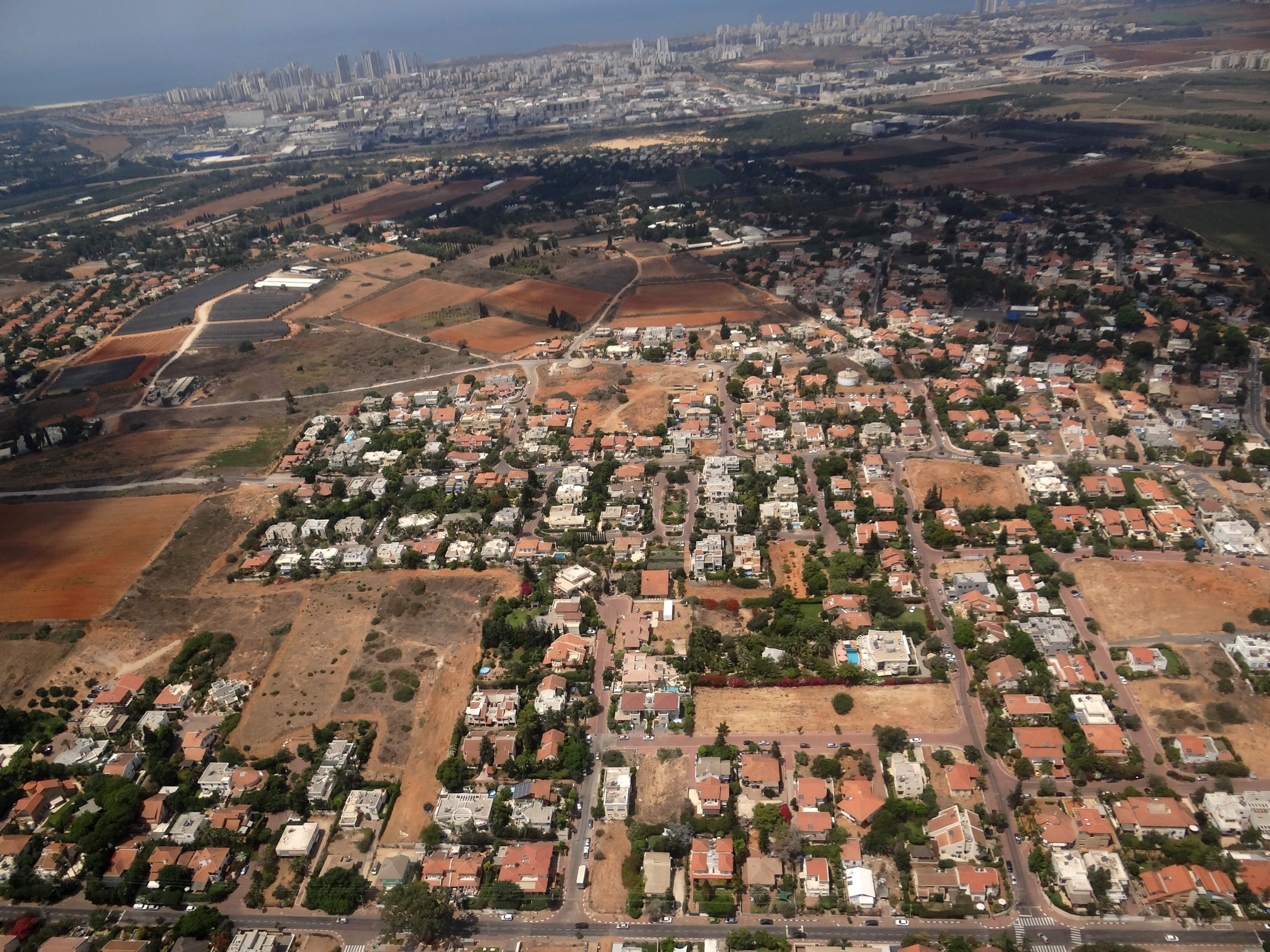

- Location within Central Israel Location within Israel
- Coordinates: 32°16′12.09″N 34°53′14.74″E
- Country: Israel
- District: Central
- Subdistrict: HaSharon
- Natural Region: Western Sharon
- Founded: 1932

Government
  - Head of Municipality: Matan Katzman

Area
  - Total: 8,398 dunams (8.398 km^{2}; 3.242 sq mi)

Population (2024)
  - Total: 15,370
  - Density: 1,830/km^{2} (4,740/sq mi)
- Website: www.even-yehuda.muni.il

Even Yehuda (Hebrew: אֶבֶן יְהוּדָה) is a town in the central Sharon region of Israel east of Netanya. In 2024 it had a population of 15,370.

== Etymology ==
Even Yehuda is named for Eliezer Ben-Yehuda, one of the leading figures in the revival of the Hebrew language.

== Location ==
Even Yehuda is bordered on the east by Kadima, on the south-east by Tel Mond, on the north by Lev HaSharon, on the west by Netanya and on the south-west by Hof HaSharon.

== History ==
=== Prehistory ===
Settlement in the future territory of Even Yehuda began in the prehistoric period. A prehistoric site known as Givʿat Roi was first identified by Roy Marom, revealing Epipalaeolithic flint artifacts. In 2024, a salvage excavation by the Israel Antiquities Authority confirmed the site's significance, uncovering lithic assemblages from the Kebaran (Early Epipaleolithic, ca. 22,000–18,500 BP) and Geometric Kebaran (Middle Epipaleolithic, ca. 18,500–15,000 BP) cultures. Over 600 flint artifacts—mainly microliths, bladelets, cores, and scrapers—were recovered, indicating seasonal occupation and on-site tool production. Givʿat Roi is the only site in the Poleg Basin showing evidence of both Epipaleolithic phases, contributing to the understanding of prehistoric settlement patterns along the central coastal plain.

=== Modern town ===
Even Yehuda is composed of the union of the moshava-type colonies of Even Yehuda, Kfar Tsur/Be'er Ganim, and Tel Tsur on 10,000 dunams the Tulkarm's Hannun familu sold in Ghabat Kufr Sur.

The moshava of Even Yehuda was founded in December 1932 by the Bnei Benyamin society and the Notea corporation. The economy was based on citrus growing.

The village of Kfar Tzur was founded in 1932 by workers of the Dead Sea Works, who named it after the Arab village of Ghabat Kafr Sur. it was renamed to Be'er Ganim the following year after a well named Bir el-Ghanem (Arabic: بئر الغنم, lit. 'sheep well') which was located in the area.

The village of Tel Tzur was founded in 1932 by teachers of Herzliya Hebrew Gymnasium led by Haim Boger.

In 1950, Even Yehuda became a local council, as it was merged with the nearby villages of Be'er Ganim and Tel Tzur.

In 2007, the Walworth Barbour American International School in Israel (WBAIS) moved to a new campus in Even Yehuda.

== Demographics ==
Historical population
Year	Pop.	±%
1972	3,700	—
1983	4,600	+24.3%
1995	7,200	+56.5%
2008	10,000	+38.9%
2022	14,989	+49.9%
2024	15,370	+2.5%

== Education ==
Even Yehuda has three elementary schools – "Bachar" school (בכר), "Beit Avi" school (בית אב"י) and "Rishonim" school (ראשונים), all mamlachti schools.

There is a children's village in Even Yehuda called WIZO Canada Children's village (הדסים), which is a middle school and a high school. In the village there are several kindergartens and a Democratic school.

== Local features ==
- "Sharonim Gardens" (בית גני שרונים) – an assisted living facility for senior citizens
- a museum (מוזיאון הראשונים) about Even Yehuda's history and founders

== Voting Patterns ==
In the 2022 election, 71 percent of voters in Even Yehuda voted for the parties of the center-left coalition led by Yair Lapid, while 27 percent voted for the parties of the right-wing coalition led by Benjamin Netanyahu and 0.3 percent voted for the Arab parties.

In the 2026 election, 73 percent of voters in Even Yehuda voted for the parties of the center-left coalition led by Gadi Eisenkot, while 22 percent voted for the parties of the right-wing coalition led by Benjamin Netanyahu and 0.3 percent voted for the Arab parties. An additional 3.1 percent voted for the Reservists, and 1.3 percent voted for Amcha Yisrael. Voter turnout increased 19 percent from the 2022 election.

== Notable residents ==
- Shira Rishony (born 1991), Olympic judoka

== Gallery ==
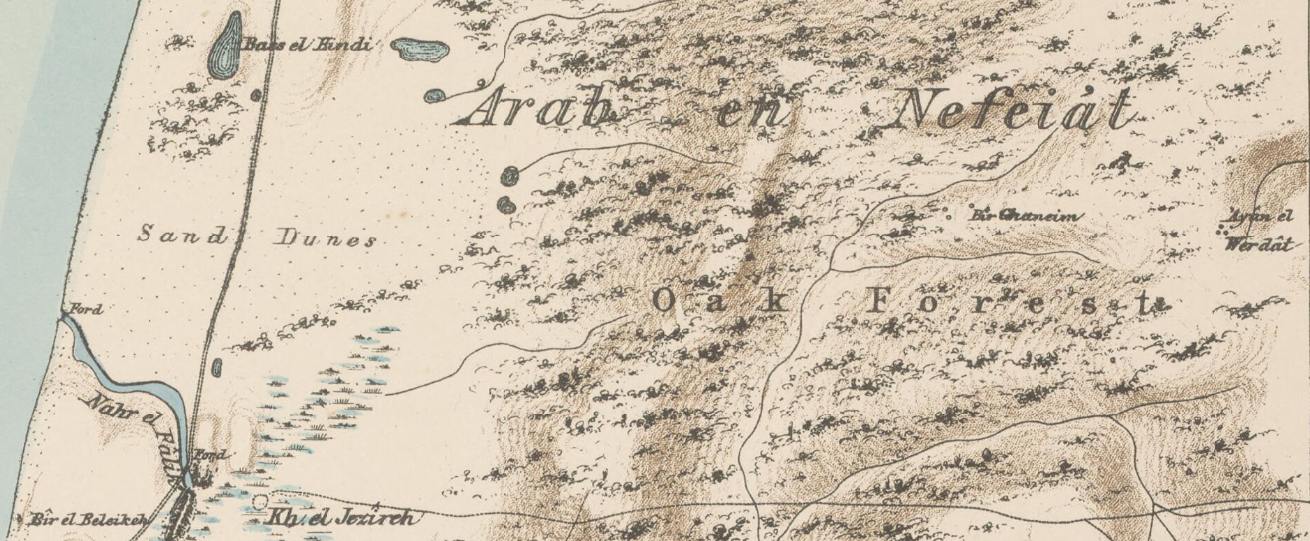
Bir Ghaneim 1878 1:63,360

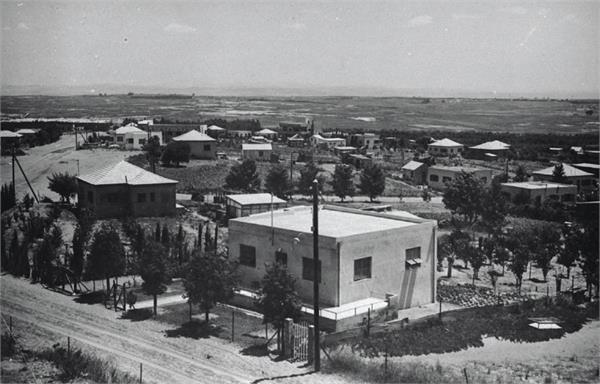
Even Yehuda. August 1938

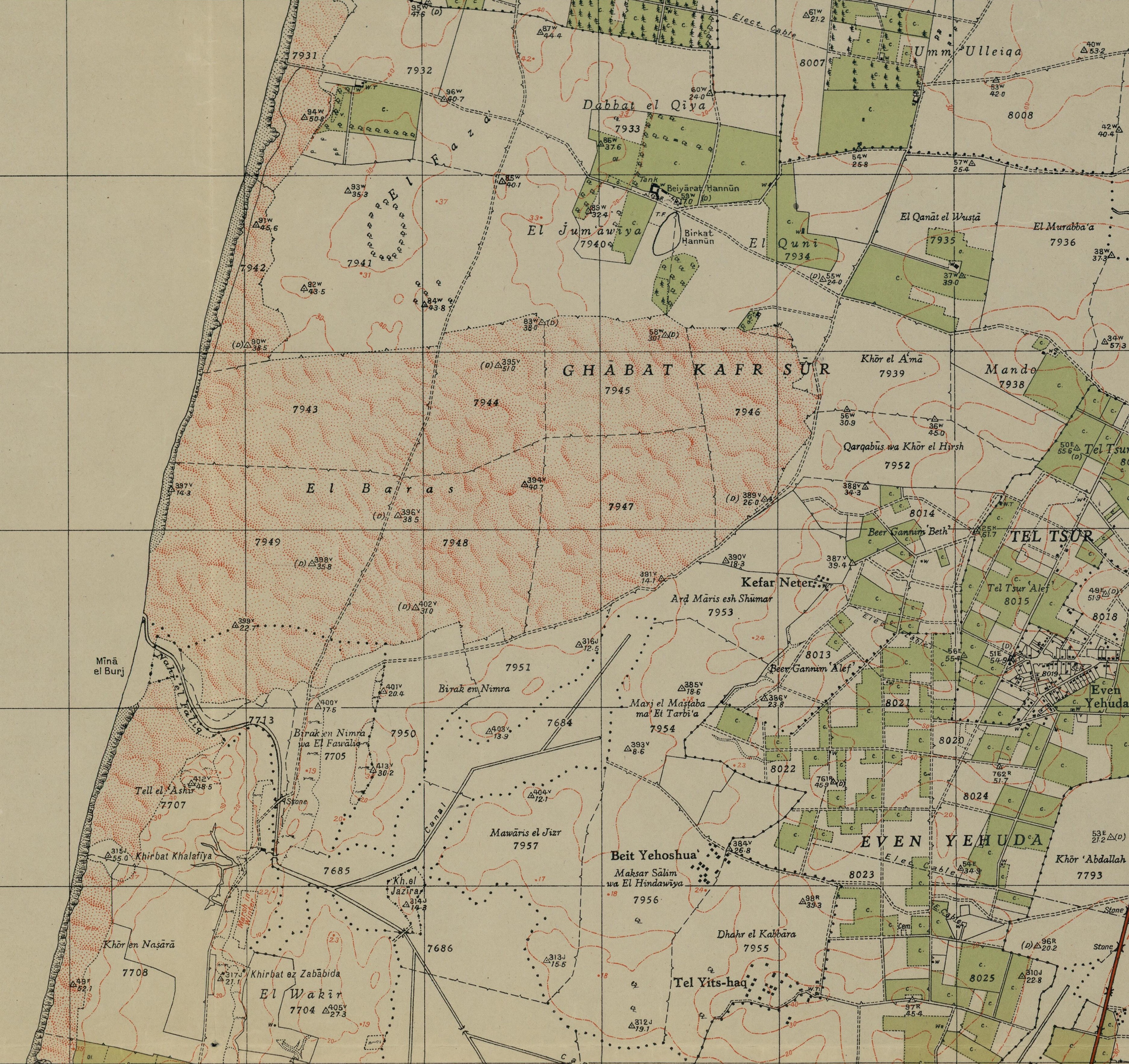
Even Yehuda 1944 1:20,000 (middle right)

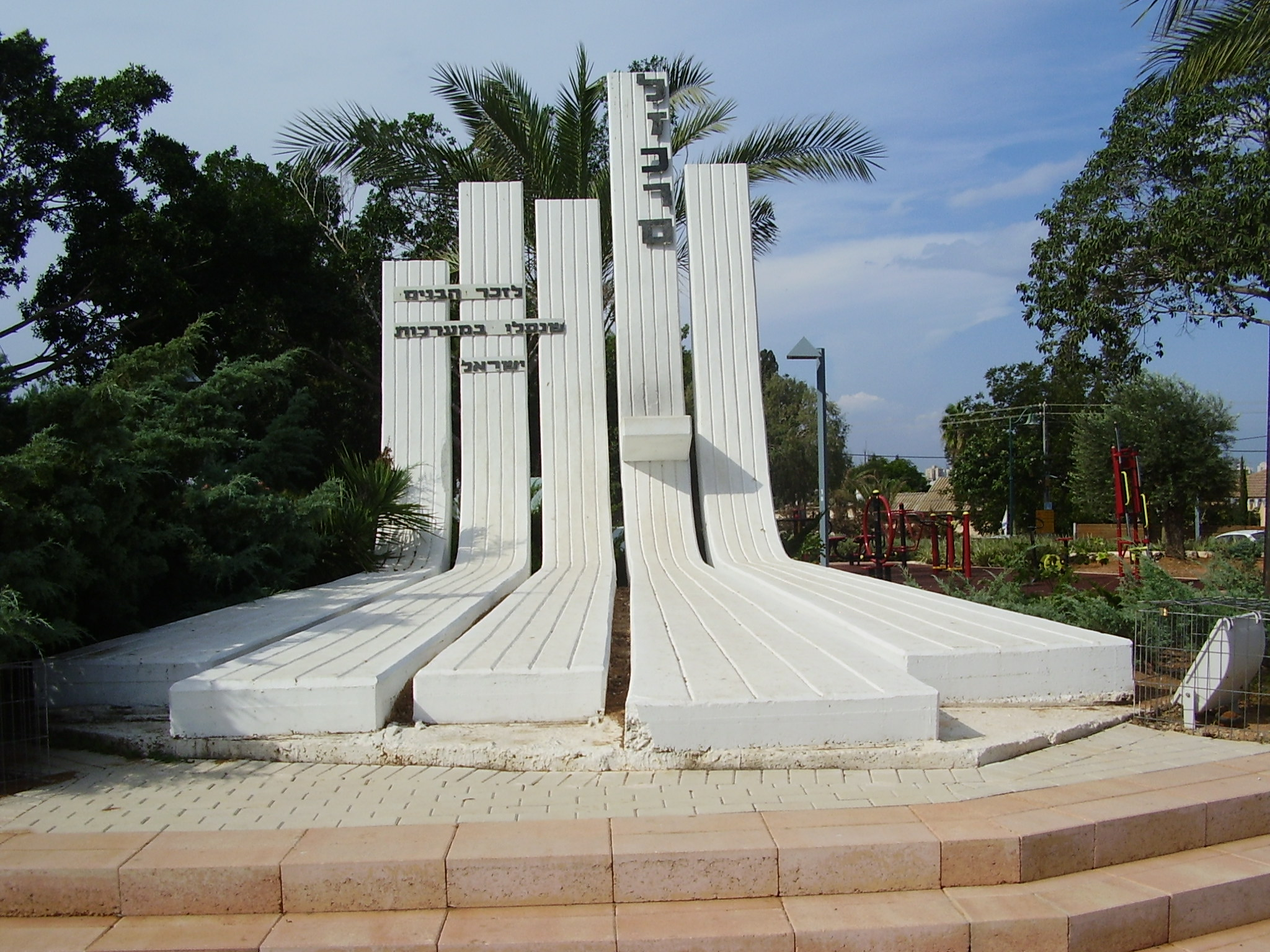
War Memorial in Even Yehuda
