= Israel Goldstein Youth Village =

Israel Goldstein Youth Village: Havat HaNoar HaTzioni חוות הנוער הציוני (Hebrew)
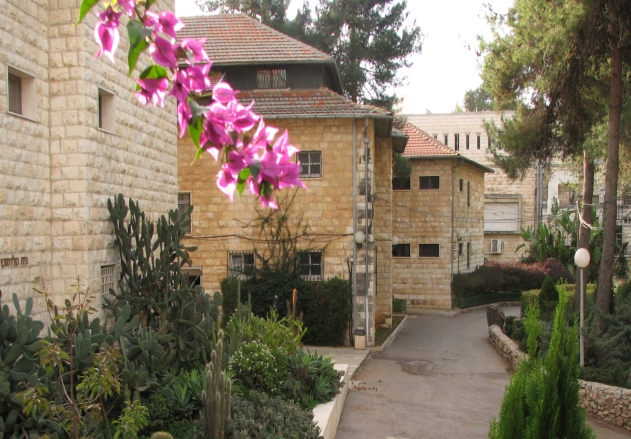

- Location within Jerusalem District
- Coordinates: 31°45′31.67″N 35°12′16.11″E
- Country: Israel
- District: Jerusalem
- Founded: 14 February 1949
- Founder: Zeev Schikler
- Website: Official website (in Hebrew)

Israel Goldstein Youth Village, known in Hebrew as the Havat HaNoar HaTzioni (Hebrew: חוות הנוער הציוני), is a youth village and high school in Jerusalem, Israel.

== History ==
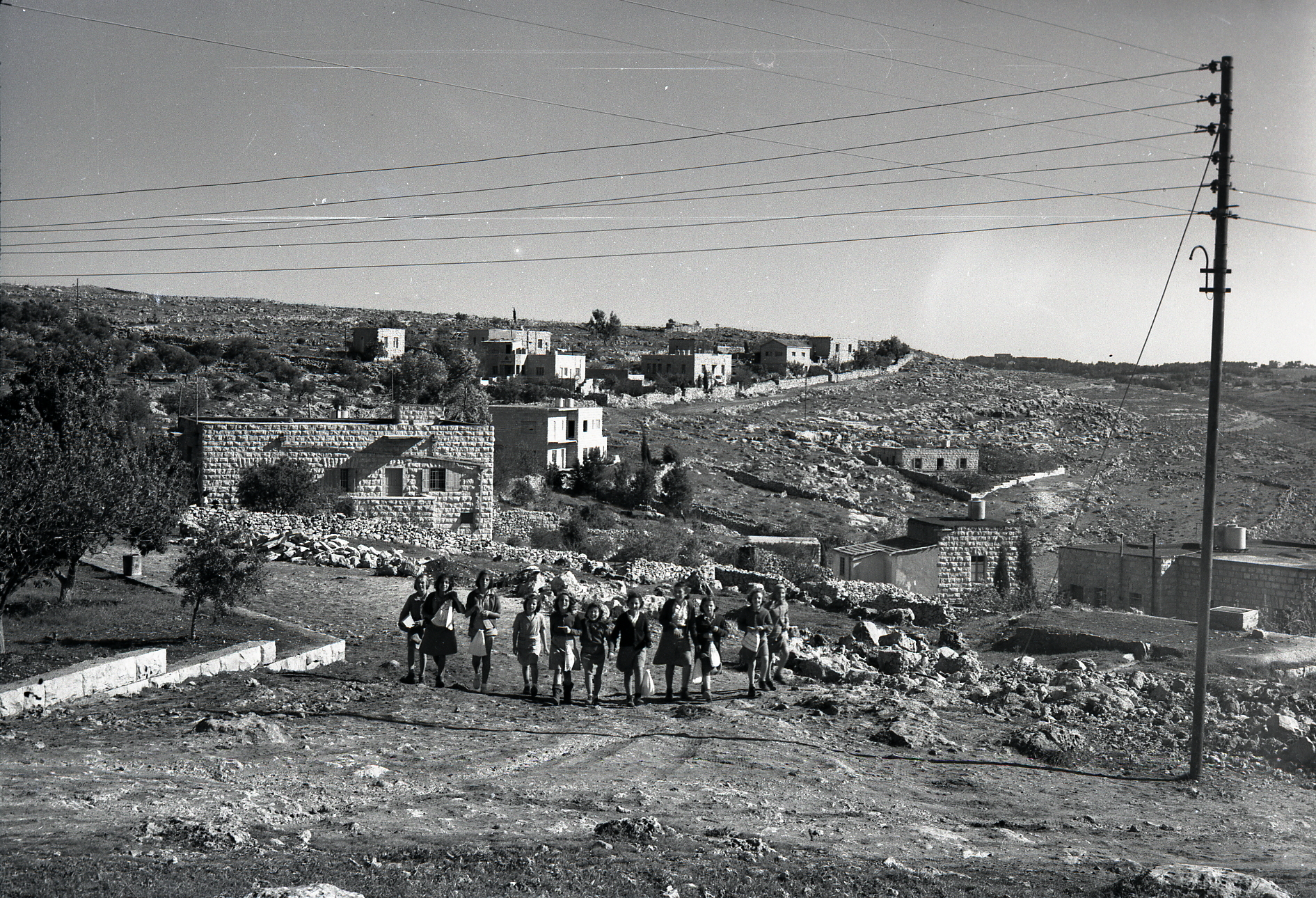
Goldstein Youth Village, 1950

Havat HaNoar HaTzioni was established in 1949 as a home for 40 Jewish orphans who lost their families in the Holocaust. It was named for Israel Goldstein, a prominent rabbi and Zionist leader. Today the school has over 500 students, many of them new immigrants.

In the summers, Havat HaNoar HaTzioni is one of the home bases of the Ramah Israel Seminar, a program affiliated with Camp Ramah, a network of Jewish summer camps in North America.

== Programs ==
Jerusalem American International School is located in the youth village.

The Lycée Havat-Hanoar-Hatsioni, a French international school, is affiliated with the youth village. Its terminale (final year of senior high school) classes were created in 1967/1968 by two groups: Nathanya by Léon Ashkénazi and Alyat Hanoar in Nazareth. These groups merged during the 1975–1976 school year. This school integrated with the youth village since 1991. It includes boarding facilities.

Tichon Ramah Yerushalayim (TRY), Ramah Israel's semester abroad high school program, is located on the North end of the campus, along with the Ramah Israel offices.

== See also ==
- Aliyah
- Zionism
- Youth village
