= Walworth Barbour American International School =

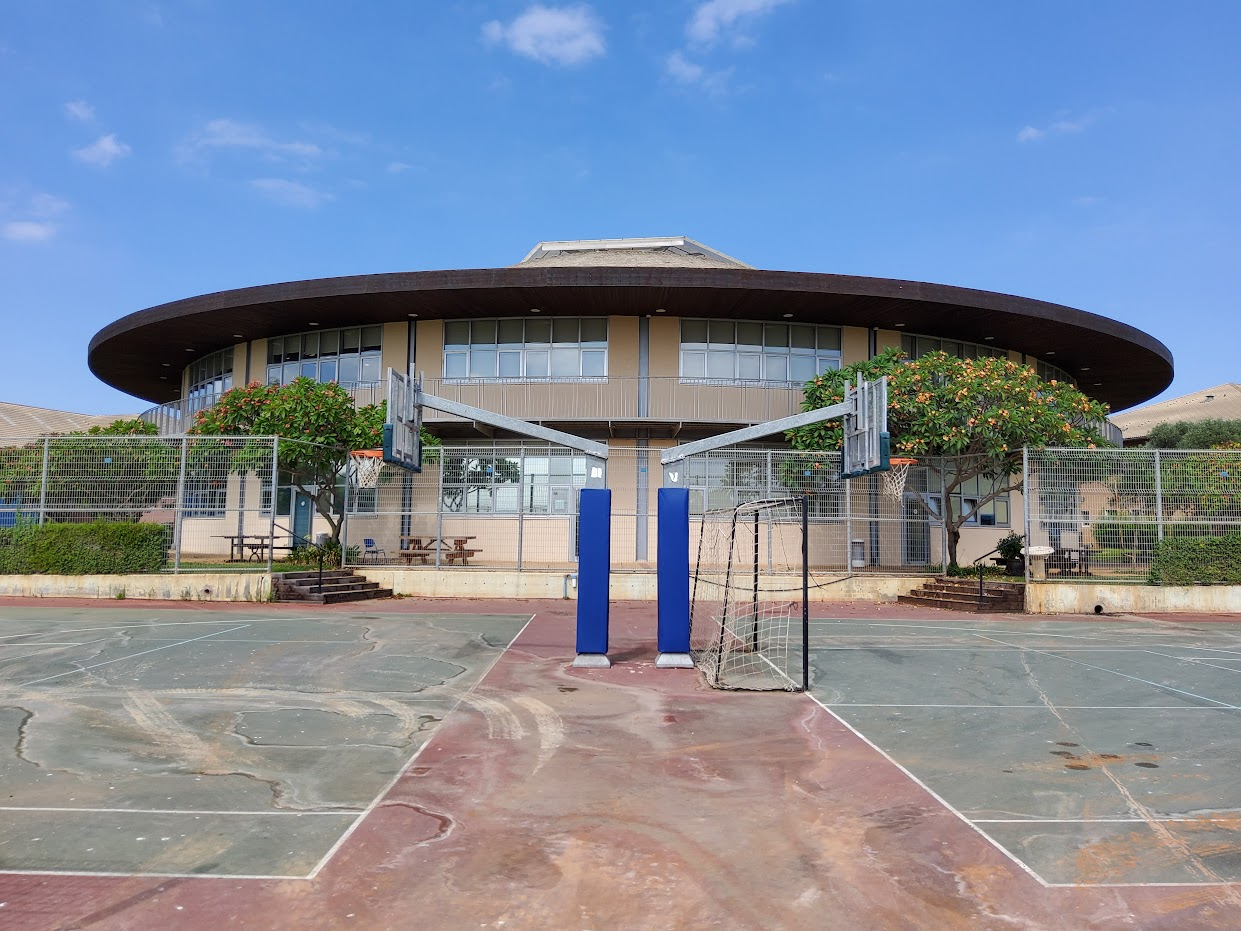
- Walworth Barbour American International School in Israel (WBAIS)

Location
- 65 Hashomron Street; Even Yehuda, Merkaz; Israel
- Coordinates: 32.26476345°N 34.87752025°E

Information
- School type: Private International
- Established: 1958
- Status: Operating
- CEEB code: 675540
- Grades: PK3-12
- Average class size: ≈14
- Colors: Blue and White
- Mascot: Falcon
- Website: WBAIS

The Walworth Barbour American International School in Israel (WBAIS) is an independent, American-curriculum, English-language school. It is composed of a campus with a preschool, elementary, middle, and high school (PK3-12) in Even Yehuda; and the Jerusalem American International School (pre-school through 12th grade).

WBAIS is accredited by the Middle States Association of Colleges and Schools and is a member of the Near East South Asia Council of Overseas Schools. It is the only primary and secondary school in Israel accredited in the United States. It is the largest school in the country that caters to the diplomatic and international community.

WBAIS was established in 1958 under the auspices of the United States Embassy and is named after former Ambassador Walworth Barbour, who represented the United States in Israel from 1961 to 1973.

The original 19-dunam (4.75-acre) campus in Kfar Shmaryahu was sold for $21 million in 2005 to real estate developers who planned to build private homes on the site. The school was relocated to a new facility on a 73-dunam (19-acre) plot in Even Yehuda in 2007, after 49 years at the Kfar Shmaryahu campus. As of 2007, enrollment is about 600 students, most of whom live in the Herzliya Pituah area, closer to the original campus.

== Jerusalem ==
The Jerusalem American International School (JAIS) is a branch of the Walworth Barbour American International School at the Goldstein Youth Village in Jerusalem, Israel.
