= Kfar Netter =

Moshav in central Israel

Kfar Netter: כְּפַר נֶטֶר (Hebrew)
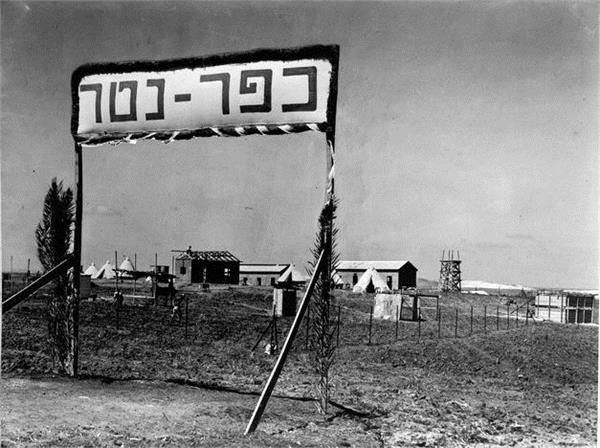
- Kfar Netter 1939

- Location within Central Israel
- Coordinates: 32°16′17″N 34°52′13″E
- Country: Israel
- District: Central
- Subdistrict: HaSharon
- Council: Hof HaSharon
- Affiliation: Agricultural Union
- Founded: 26 June 1939
- Founder: Mikveh Israel graduates
- Population (2024): 987
- Website: www.kfarnetter.co.il

Kfar Netter (Hebrew: כְּפַר נֶטֶר, lit. 'Netter Village') is a moshav in central Israel. Located in the coastal plain near Netanya, it falls under the jurisdiction of Hof HaSharon Regional Council. In 2024 it had a population of 987.

== History ==
The region of Kfar Netter has been inhabited intermittently since the Middle Paleolithic age, with peak periods of settlement during the Byzantine (4th–7th centuries CE) and Late Ottoman periods (19- early 20th centuries CE). Before the 20th century the area formed part of the Forest of Sharon and was part of the lands of the village of Ghabat Kafr Sur. It was an open woodland dominated by Mount Tabor Oak, which extended from Kfar Yona in the north to Ra'anana in the south. The local Arab inhabitants traditionally used the area for pasture, firewood and intermittent cultivation. The intensification of settlement and agriculture in the coastal plain during the 19th century led to deforestation and subsequent environmental degradation.

The moshav was established on 26 June 1939 by graduates of the Mikveh Israel agricultural school as part of the tower and stockade settlement programme. It was named after Charles Netter, who founded Mikveh Israel.

== Notable residents ==
- Gefen Primo (born 2000), judoka
