= Kiryat Ye'arim Youth Village =

Kiryat Ye'arim Youth Village: קריית יערים (Hebrew); كريات يعاريم (Arabic)
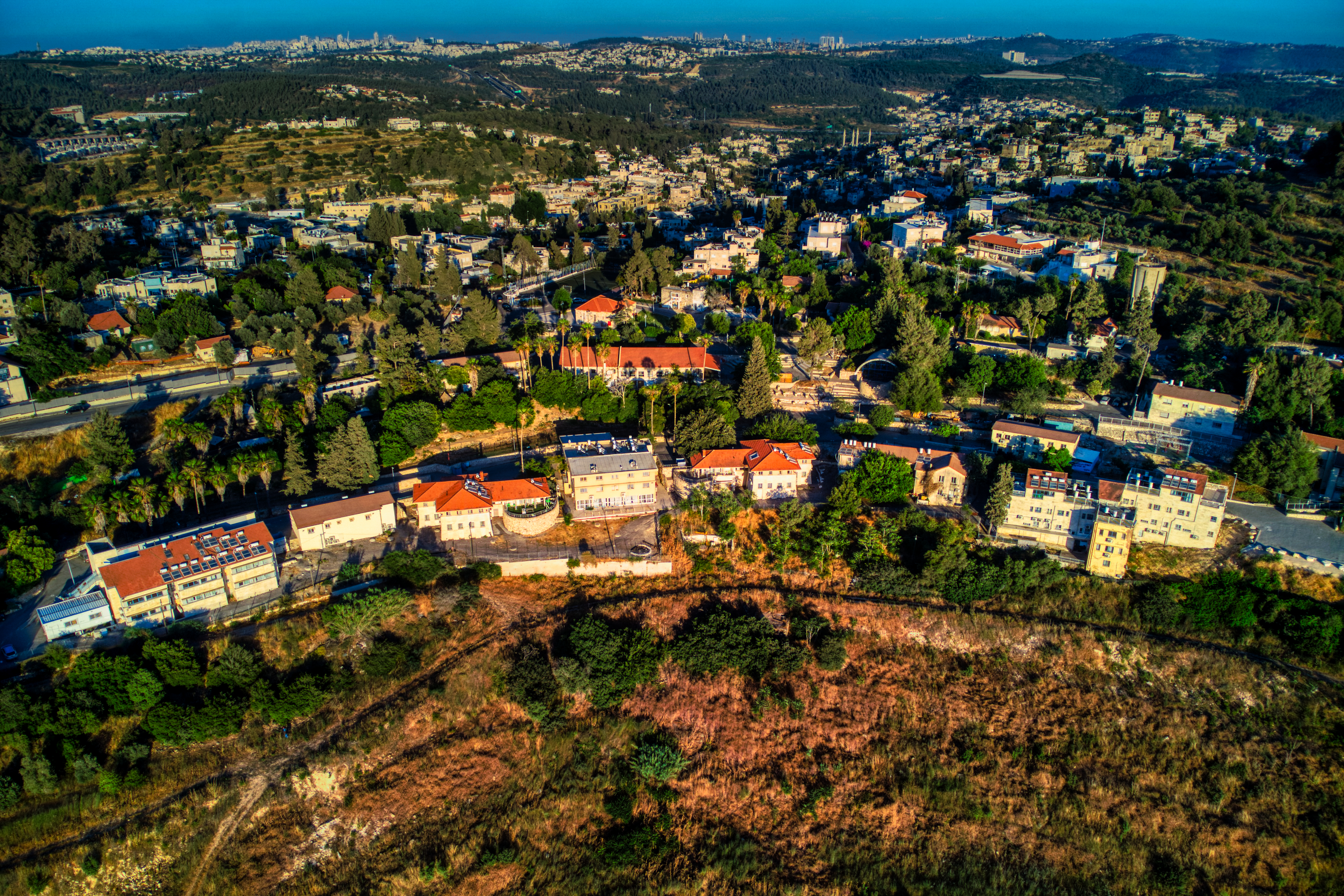

- Location within Jerusalem District
- Coordinates: 31°48′44″N 35°6′13″E
- Country: Israel
- District: Jerusalem
- Council: Mateh Yehuda
- Founded: 1952
- Population (2024): 65

Kiryat Ye'arim Youth Village (Hebrew: כפר הנוער קריית יערים, romanized: Kfar HaNoar Kiryat Ye'arim) is a youth village in central Israel. Located near Kiryat Ye'arim and to the north of Abu Ghosh, it falls under the jurisdiction of Mateh Yehuda Regional Council. In 2024, it had a population of 65.

== History ==
The village was established in 1952 with a donation from Swiss Jews. Yisrael Katz, later a government minister, ran the village between 1954 and 1959.
