= Darfur genocide =

Darfur genocide may refer to:

- Darfur genocide (2003–2005), the systematic killing of ethnic Darfuri people during the War in Darfur
- Darfur genocide (2023–present), a series of persecutions and mass killings of non-Arabs in Darfur

== See also ==
- Masalit genocide, ongoing persecutions and mass killings of the Masalit people in West Darfur
