= Bayyarat Hannun =

Bayyarat Hannun بيّارة حنون
- Village
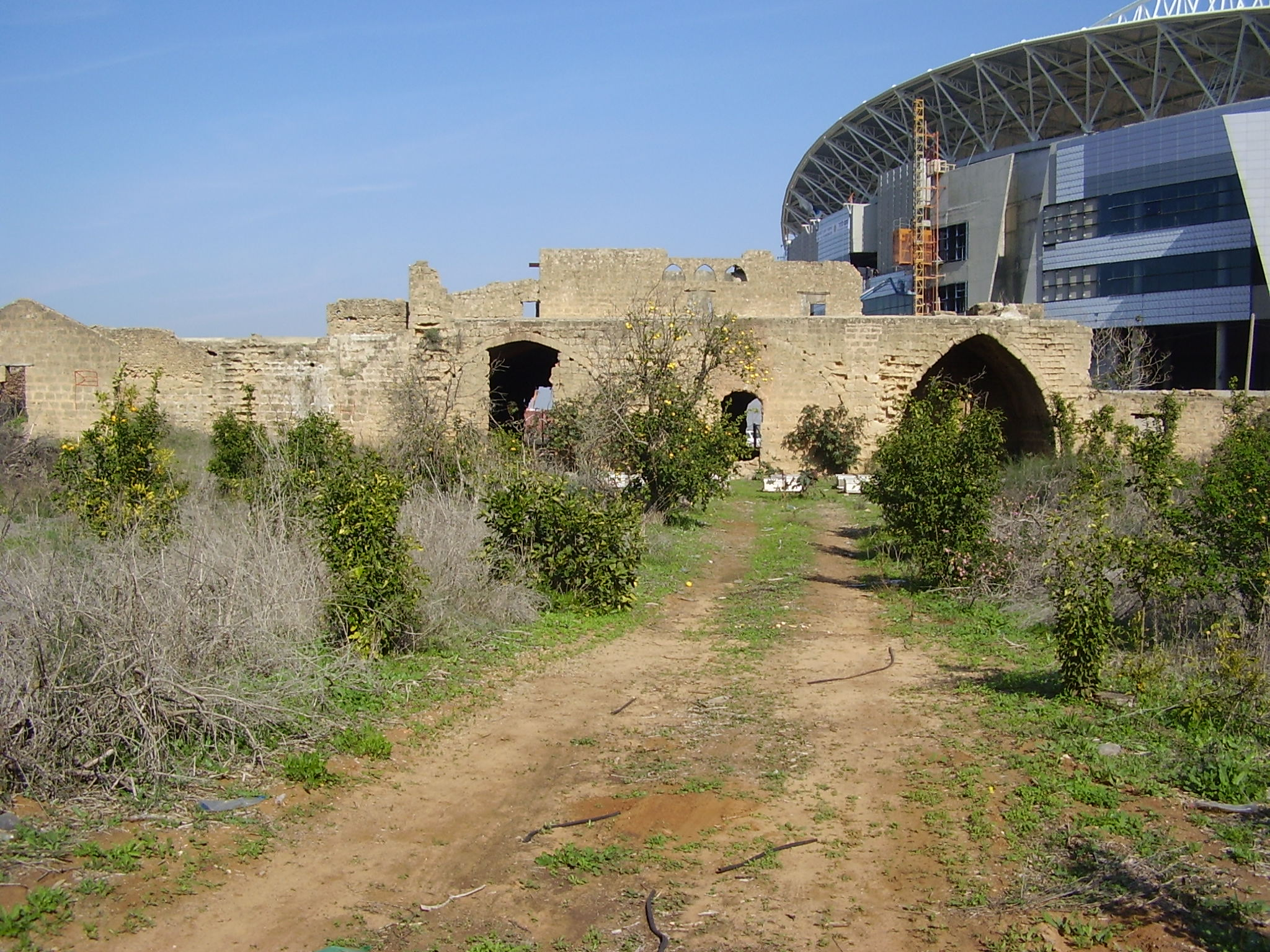
- Part of Bayyarat Hannun, during construction of Netanya Stadium
- Etymology: from Bayyara, meaning "orchard"
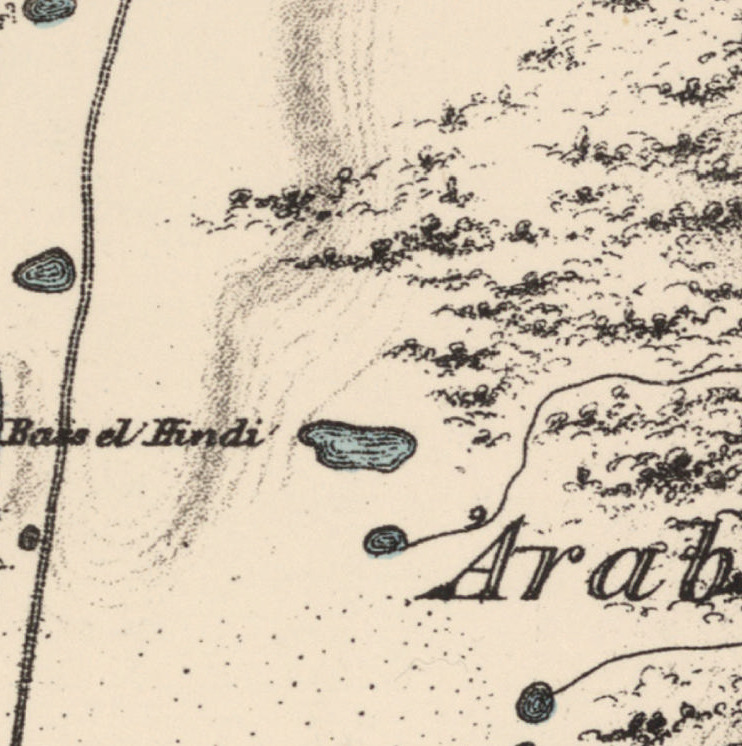
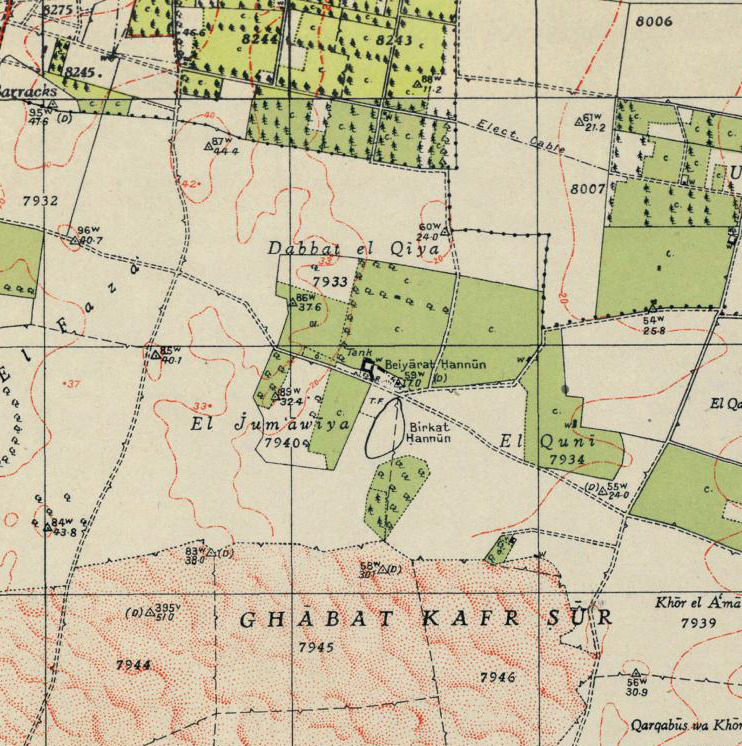
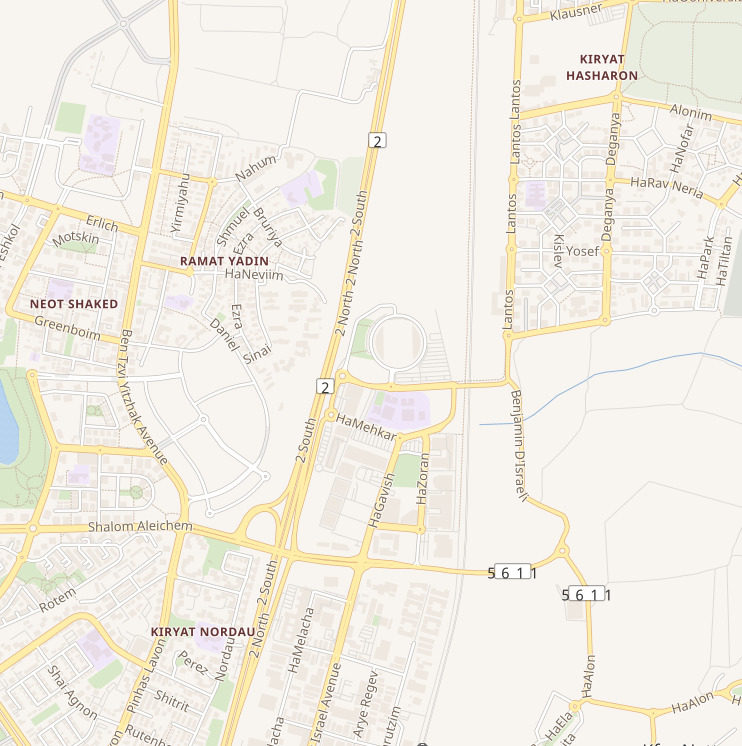
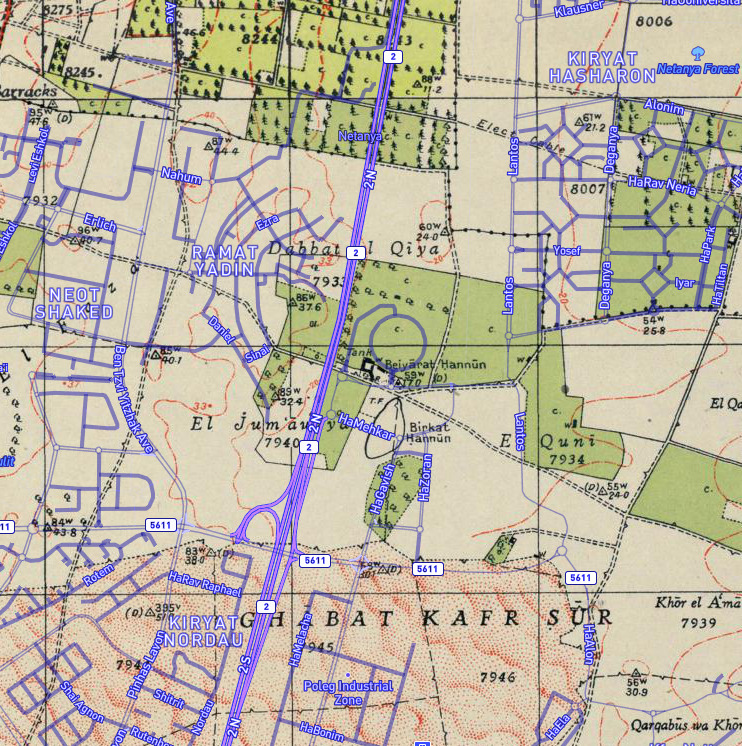
- 1870s map 1940s map modern map 1940s with modern overlay map A series of historical maps of the area around Bayyarat Hannun (click the buttons)

- Location within Mandatory Palestine
- Coordinates: 32°17′36″N 34°51′48″E
- Palestine grid: 137/188
- Geopolitical entity: Mandatory Palestine
- Subdistrict: Tulkarm
- Date of depopulation: Early April 1948

Population (1931)
  - Total: 559 with Ghabat Kafr Sur and 'Arab el Balawina
- Cause(s) of depopulation: Fear of being caught up in the fighting
- Secondary cause: Expulsion by Yishuv forces

Bayyarat Hannun was a Palestinian agricultural estate in the Tulkarm Subdistrict in Mandatory Palestine. It was depopulated during "Operation Coastal Clearing" on March 31, 1948 in the 1947–48 Civil War in Mandatory Palestine. It was located 16 km west of Tulkarm.

== Geography ==
Bayyarat Hannun was located on a small elevation, just north of a pond.

== History ==
The first part of the name Bayyara, meaning "orchard", referring to the vast agricultural estate established in 1890 by members of the Hannun family from Tulkarm in their lands in Ghabat Kafr Sur.

The village was noted as a hamlet in the Palestine Index Gazetteer.

In the 1931 census of Palestine, the bayyara was counted with nearby Ghabat Kafr Sur and 'Arab el Balawina, which together had a population of 559; 6 Christians and 553 Muslims, in a total of 128 houses. According to Roy Marom, among the residents were "about 200 itinerant workers from Egypt, and lower-class tribesmen like ‘Arab al-Balawna, ‘Arab al-Huwaytat and ‘Arab al-Qatatwa."

Excavations revealed traces of Late Ottoman infant jar-burials, commonly associated with nomads or itinerant workers of Egyptian origins.

=== Aftermath of the 1947–48 Civil War in Mandatory Palestine ===
The village became depopulated in early April 1948, during Operation Coastal Clearing carried out by Haganah. Benny Morris provided "fear of being caught up in the fighting" and "Expulsion by Yishuv forces" as reasons for depopulation, while Rosemarie Esber noted "on-site massacre, atrocities, rape, expulsion by Zionist forces" as the reason for Bayyarat Hannun's depopulation.

By 1992, the southern part of Netanya had expanded within 500 meters from the village site.

== Bibliography ==
- Esber, R.M. (2008). Under the Cover of War, The Zionist Expulsions of the Palestinians. Arabicus Books & Media. ISBN 978-0981513171.
- Khalidi, W. (1992). All That Remains: The Palestinian Villages Occupied and Depopulated by Israel in 1948. Washington D.C.: Institute for Palestine Studies. ISBN 0-88728-224-5.
- Mills, E., ed. (1932). Census of Palestine 1931. Population of Villages, Towns and Administrative Areas. Jerusalem: Government of Palestine.
- Morris, B. (2004). The Birth of the Palestinian Refugee Problem Revisited. Cambridge University Press. ISBN 978-0-521-00967-6.
