= Youth Aliyah =

Jewish humanitarian organization

Youth Aliyah Child Rescue
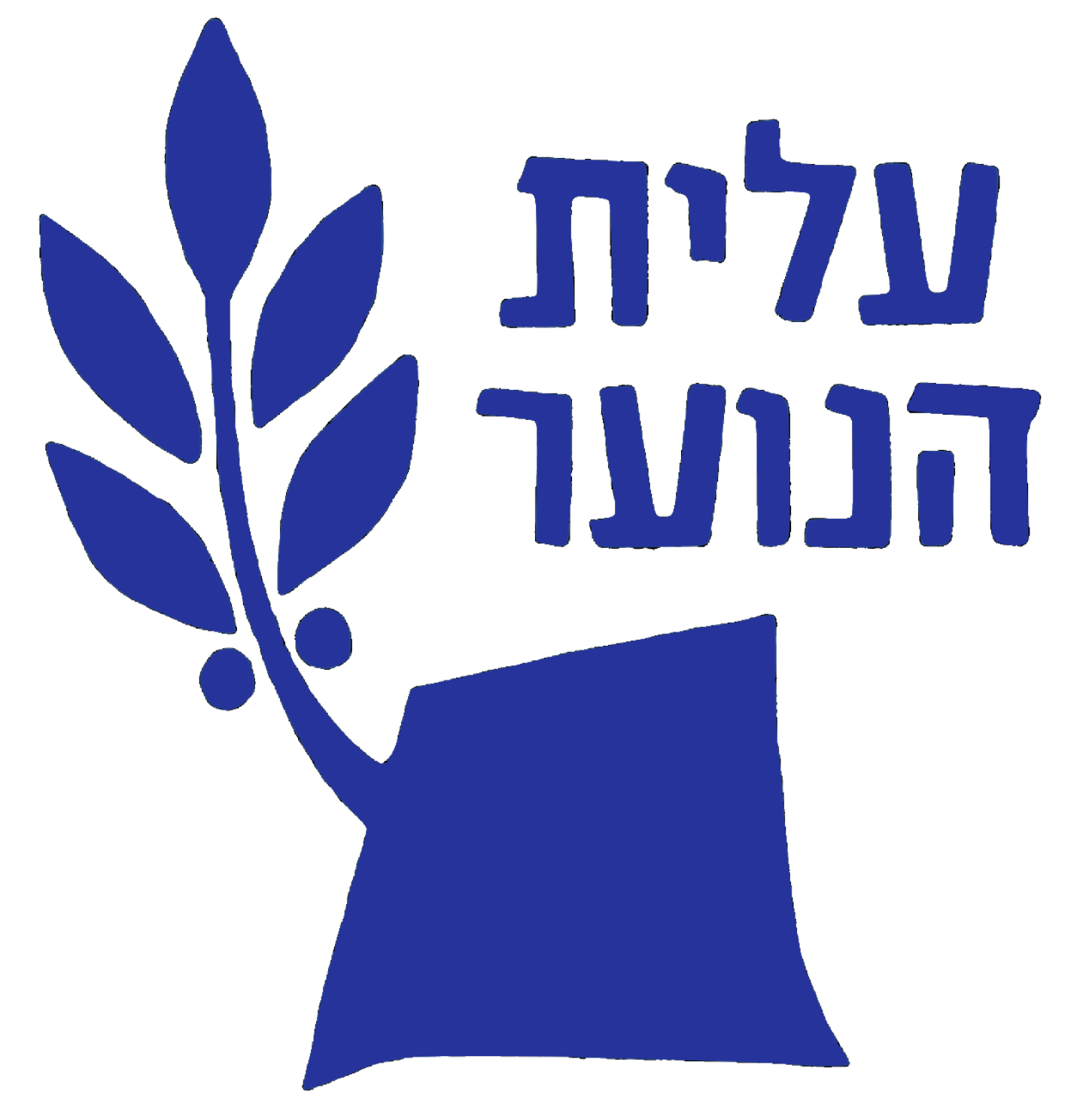
- Founded: 30 January 1933
- Founder: Recha Freier
- Purpose: Humanitarian
- Location: Berlin
- Region served: Israel
- Method: Rescue, accommodation, education and development

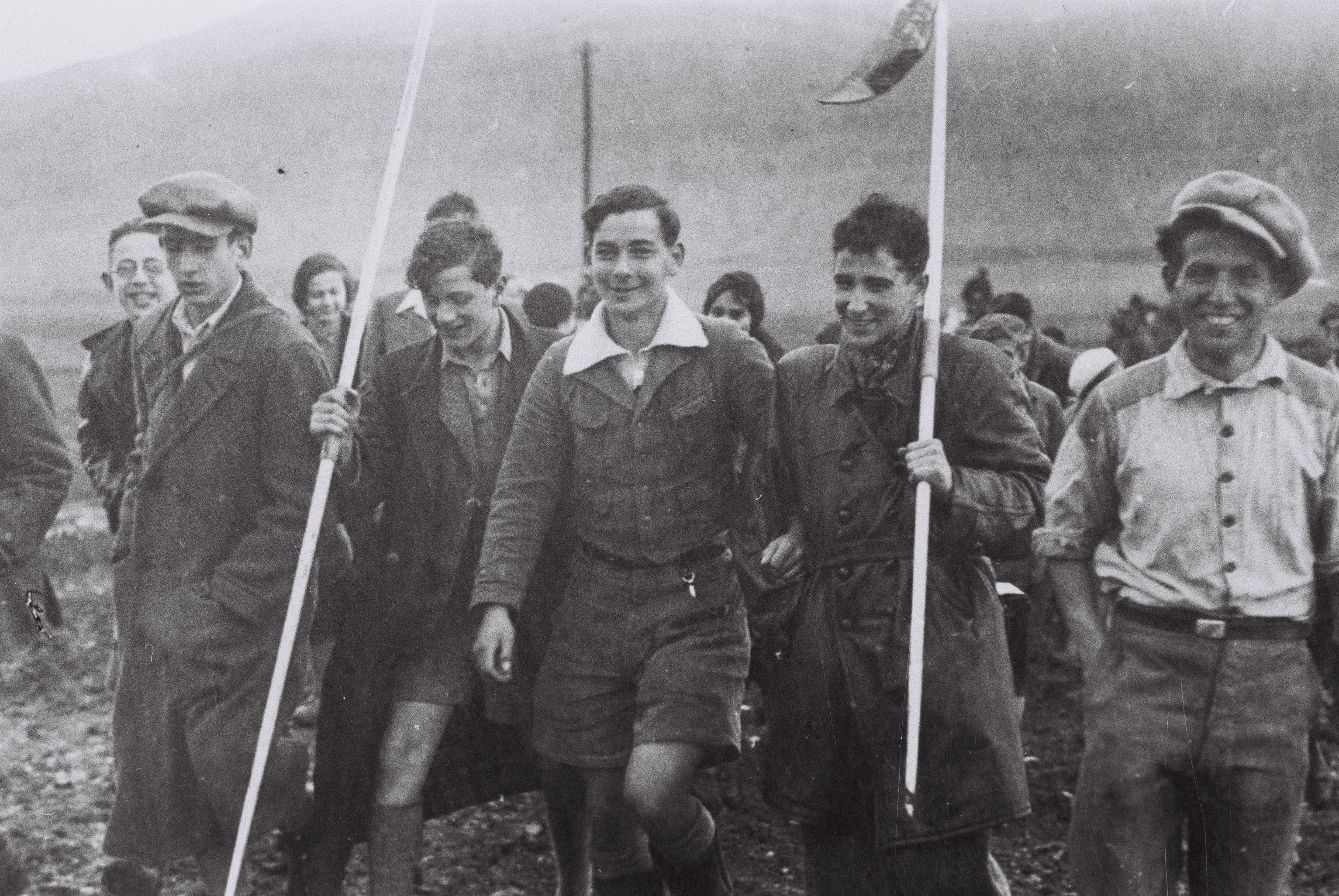
The first German Youth-Aliyah group walking to Kibbutz Ein Harod

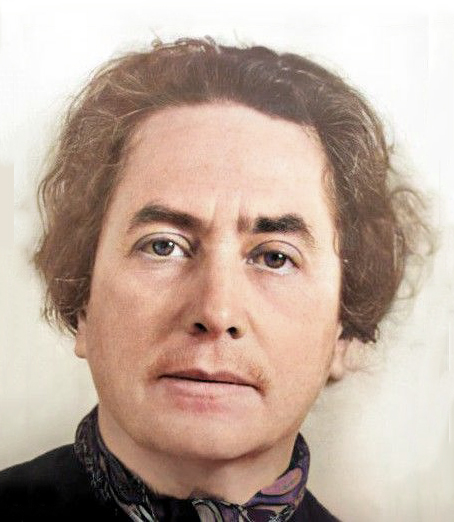
Recha Freier, founder of the Youth Aliyah (~1964)

Youth Aliyah (Hebrew: עלית הנוער, Aliyat Hano'ar, German: Jugend-Alijah, Youth Immigration) is a Jewish organization that rescued thousands of Jewish children from the Nazis during the Third Reich. Youth Aliyah arranged for their resettlement in Mandatory Palestine in kibbutzim and youth villages that became both home and school.

== History ==
Recha Freier, a rabbi's wife, founded Youth Aliyah in Berlin on the same day that Adolf Hitler took power, Monday 30 January 1933. The organisation was founded as a work study training program but became a means to save Jewish children from the growing Nazi regime. The idea was supported by the World Zionist Organization. Freier supervised the organization's activities in Germany, and Henrietta Szold, after at first opposing Freier's initiative, in Jerusalem.

Israeli postage stamps celebrating Youth Aliyah
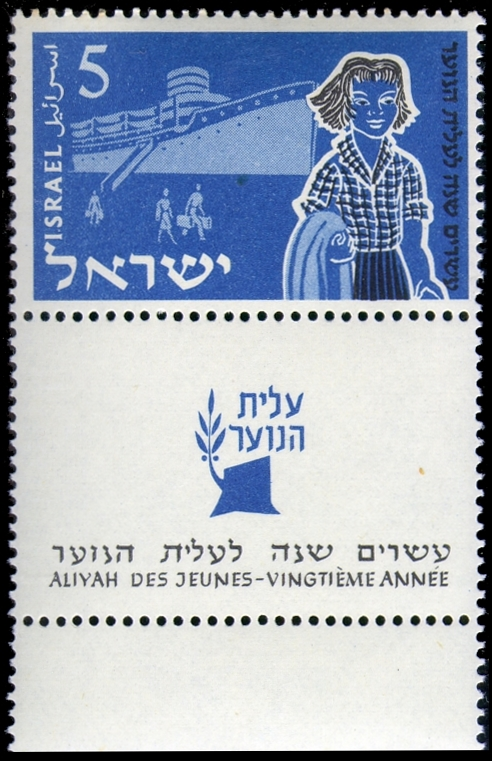
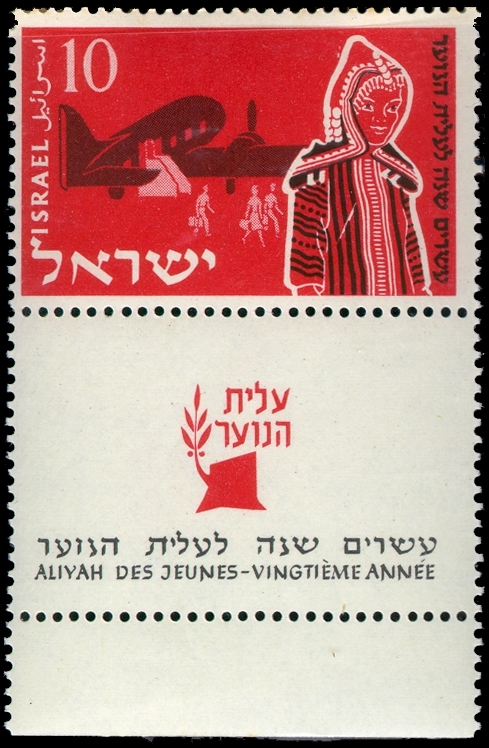

Szold was skeptical about the merits of Freier's proposal because, as the person responsible for social services by the Jewish Agency in Mandatory Palestine, she was extremely pressed for funds and loath to take on a new untried program for German Jewish children. Then Recha Freier approached Dr. Siegfried Lehman, founder and director of Ben Shemen Youth Village. He agreed to accept 12 children. Henrietta Szold was informed and changed her mind, agreeing to organize and lead the effort.

At the time, Tamar de Sola Pool, a former national president of Hadassah, and her husband had just completed a visit to Mandatory Palestine and were about to return to the US. Szold met her and explained the decision to initiate the major effort of Youth Aliyah and that Mrs. de Sola Pool must convince Hadassah to accept it as an important project. She was convinced and, after convincing Hadassah, called Eddie Cantor, the actor-comedian. He wrote her a check for $25,000 to start the program. Hadassah has continued to be the major supporter of Youth Aliyah to this day.

With Hitler's rise to power the Nuremberg Racial Laws were enacted in 1935 and on 31 March 1936 German elementary schools were closed to Jewish children. Szold coordinated an appeal to Jewish communities around the world in conjunction with the Jewish Agency.

After a brief period of training in Germany, Youth Aliyah children were placed on kibbutzim for two years to learn farming and Hebrew. Kibbutz Ein Harod in the Jezreel Valley was one of the first cooperative settlements to host such groups. Many of the children found it difficult being separated from their families, and they often realized the reasons for their journey and that they would not be returning to Europe. Parents struggled with the decision to send off their children to Palestine and expected to join them there later on, however many were murdered in the Holocaust. Youth Aliyah had a quota system in which they required at least 60% of the children to be boys, in order to ensure that a substantial number could work on the farms.

Just before the outbreak of World War II, when immigration certificates to Mandatory Palestine became difficult to obtain, Youth Aliyah activists in London came up with an interim solution whereby groups of young people would receive pioneer training in countries outside the Third Reich until they could immigrate to Palestine. Jewish immigration facilitated by the United Kingdom became increasingly difficult and complicated as the Italian-Abyssinian war affected Britain's relationship with Palestine. Starting in 1936, to appease Arabs that were against Jewish immigration, Britain greatly reduced the number of immigrants through the Youth Aliyah program. As a result, Britain shifted immigration internally within the United Kingdom. Out of the approximately 10,000 children who migrated to Great Britain under the auspices of the Kindertransport program, some intended to reach Mandatory Palestine with Youth Aliyah at a later time. After this British policy was formulated in November 1938, it facilitated not only thousands of Jewish children settling in the United Kingdom on a permanent basis, but also 3,400 staying there temporarily on the way to Mandatory Palestine. As the war spread across Europe, the program expanded to save children from occupied countries such as Yugoslavia.

Britain would continue to allow foreign policy to affect their support of the Youth Aliyah program which resulted in the organization saving less children from Nazi tyranny and violence. In 1938, the British government withdrew their previous support of the Balfour Declaration, limiting their commitment to create a Jewish homeland. As violent anti-Semitism metastasized in Europe, Britain attempted to move 5,000 children from Germany into Mandatory Palestine. In 1939, only 240 children were brought to Mandatory Palestine. Immigration certificates given to the Youth Aliyah program became increasingly hard to obtain as Britain failed to give full support. The cynical foreign policy from Great Britain held the program back and failed to save thousands of children from the Nazi regime.

Despite waning British support, Youth Aliyah found modest success. Around 5,600 children immigrated to Palestine through the program. Most children came from Germany and Austria as a meager 139 Jewish children emigrated from Poland through the program, a devastating low number considering the hundreds of thousands of children who were left behind and eventually exterminated.

Freier experienced significant opposition from the Jewish community in Germany, who continued to believe that appeasement and accommodation was the best course for Germany's Jews. In 1938 she was expelled from the board of the organisation that she had founded, the Jewish Youth Support Committee, because of her controversial use of illegal methods. In 1940 she was denounced by colleagues for anti-Nazi agitation, but was warned in time, and managed to flee to Mandatory Palestine, taking 40 teenagers with her.

After World War II and the Holocaust, emissaries were sent to Europe to locate child survivors in displaced persons camps. A Youth Aliyah office was opened in Paris. Children's homes in Eastern Europe were moved to Western Europe, Youth Aliyah believing (correctly) that immigration from Communist countries would be difficult later on.

In all 5,000 teenagers were brought to Mandatory Palestine before World War II and educated at Youth Aliyah boarding schools. Others were smuggled out of occupied Europe in the early years of the war, some to Palestine, others to the United Kingdom and other countries. After the war an additional 15,000, most of them Holocaust survivors, were brought to Mandatory Palestine.

Later, Youth Aliyah became a department of the Jewish Agency. Over the years, the organization has brought young people to Israel from North Africa, Central and Eastern Europe, Latin America, the Soviet Union and Ethiopia.

== Today ==
Youth Aliyah Child Rescue continues to play a role in the absorption of young newcomers to Israel, particularly from the former Soviet Union and Africa. In addition, the organisation offers a second chance to Israeli youth who have been designated 'at risk' by child care authorities.

Children in the care of Youth Aliyah are housed in five youth residential villages in Israel. The villages include schools, dorms, clubhouses and playgrounds, and offer emotional support, education, developmental training and extra-curricular activity. More than 2,000 children have found a home and a new and more meaningful life through the organization.

The children come from a wide variety of backgrounds, and often have serious emotional, psychological and behavioral difficulties. Many come from disadvantaged, low income or dysfunctional families, very often single-parent families. They are often at risk because of poverty, neglect, domestic violence, sexual abuse, drug or alcohol abuse, mental illness, homelessness or delinquent behaviour. Other children suffer from cancer and need respite care, while others come from families that have been victims of terror.

Alonei Yitzhak was founded in 1948, houses 400 youth, and emphasises music, drama and dance. Neve Hadassah, near Netanya, houses 310 youth. Talpiot, in Hadera, houses 200 youth. Torah o'Mikzoah, south of Hadera, caters specifically to religious teenage boys unable to fit into a high school yeshiva environment. Alongside education in torah, it offers vocational training in motor mechanics and engineering. Yemin Orde, near Haifa, houses 500 youth. It has twice received the President's Award for Excellence in Education. Outreach programs run throughout the summer months. This facility was destroyed by wildfire in 2011, and is being rebuilt.

== Awards and recognition ==
In 1958, Youth Aliyah was awarded the Israel Prize for its contribution to education, being the first year in which the Prize was awarded to an organization.

== Directors ==
Directors of Youth Aliyah after the establishment of the State of Israel include Moshe Kol, Meir Gottesmann (1978–1984), Uri Gordon and Eli Amir.

== See also ==
- Hakhshara
- Youth village
- Yom HaAliyah
- Birthright Israel
- Am Yisrael Foundation
- Kindertransport
- World Jewish Relief
- Sarah (Wolf) Goodman
- List of Israel Prize recipients
