= Youth village =

Type of Israeli boarding school

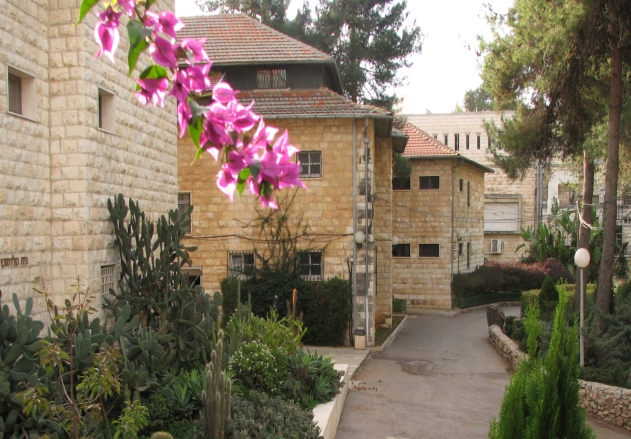
Havat HaNoar HaTzioni, Jerusalem

A youth village (Hebrew: כפר נוער, romanized: Kfar No'ar) is a boarding school model first developed in Mandatory Palestine in the 1930s to care for groups of children and teenagers fleeing the Nazis. Henrietta Szold and Recha Freier were the pioneers in this sphere, known as youth aliyah, creating an educational facility that was a cross between a European boarding school and a kibbutz.

== History ==
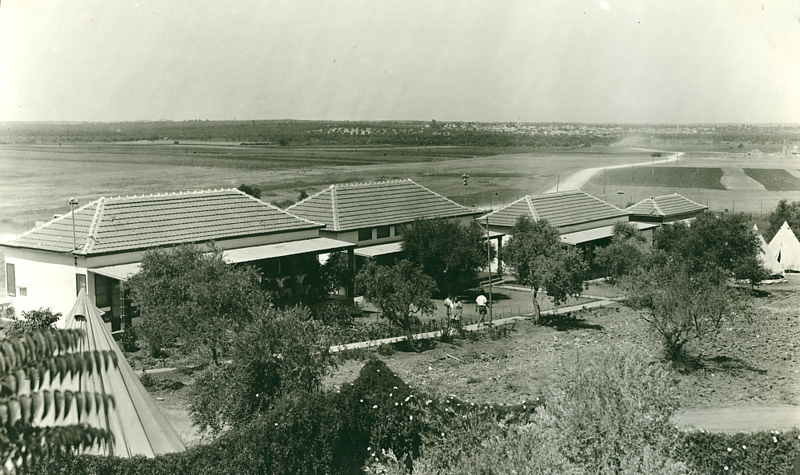
Ben Shemen youth village, 1920s–1930s

The first youth village was Mikve Israel. In the 1940s and 1950s, a period of mass immigration to Israel, youth villages were an important tool in immigrant absorption. Youth villages were established during this period by the Jewish Agency, WIZO, and Na'amat. After the establishment of Israel, the Israeli Ministry of Education took over the administration of these institutions, but not their ownership.

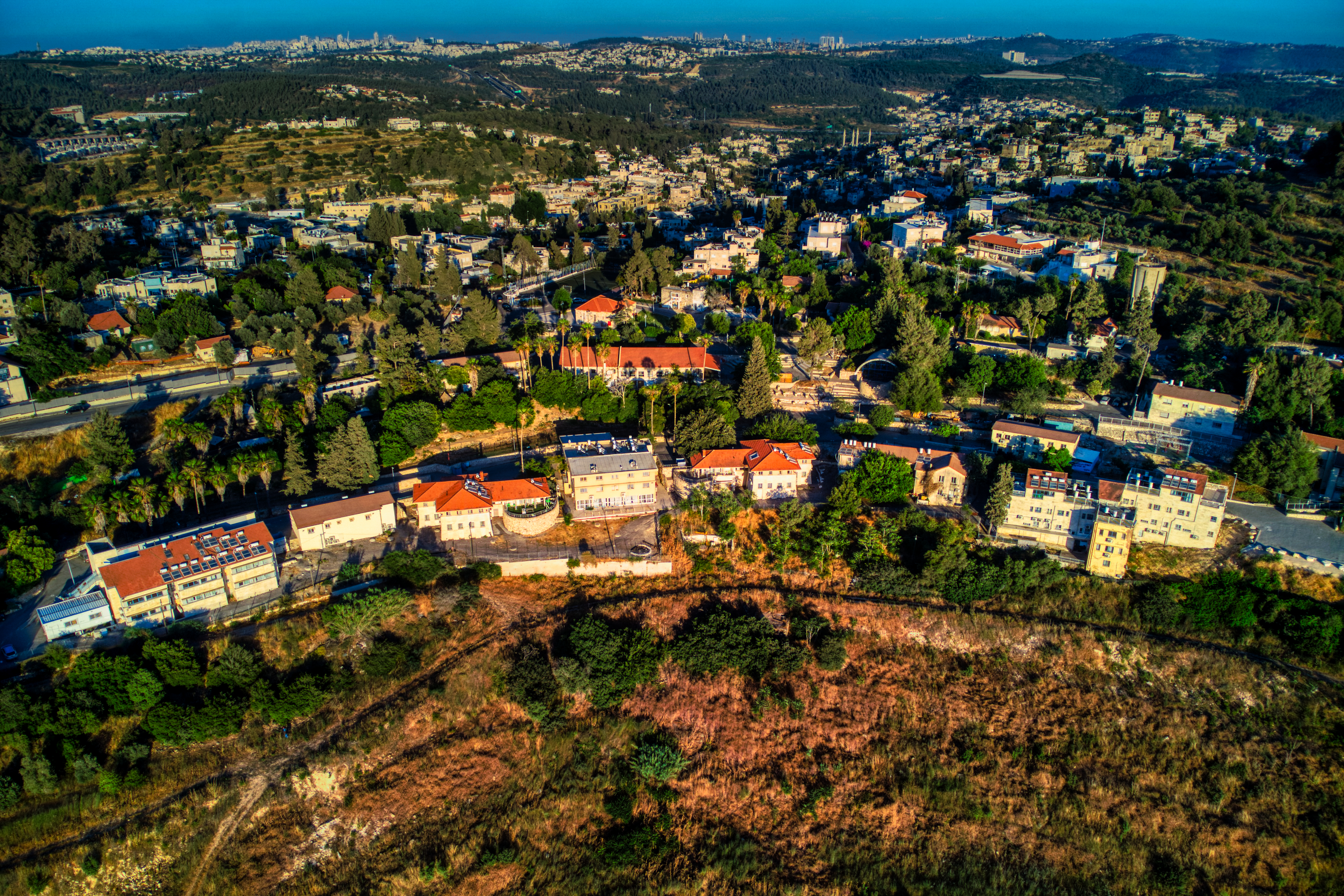
Kiryat Ye'arim Youth Village

The Hadassah Neurim Youth Village, founded by Akiva Yishai, was the first vocational school for Youth Aliyah children, who had been offered only agricultural training until then.

From the 1960s to the 1980s, young people from broken or troubled homes were sent to youth villages. Today some of the villages have closed, but many continue to provide an educational framework for immigrant youth. Others have introduced programs for gifted students from underprivileged neighborhoods, exchange programs for overseas high school students and vocational training facilities. Some function as ordinary high schools and accept non-residential students.

In 2007, Yemin Orde Youth Village, established in the early 1950s on Mount Carmel, had a student population consisting of youngsters from all over the world, including Muslim refugees from Darfur. The village provides a safe haven for destitute children aged 5–19. In 2007 a youth village patterned after the Israeli model was being established in Rwanda.

== Educational strategy ==
Residential education is believed to have special value for the two major population targets of Youth Aliyah: immigrant youth and young people from deprived social groups. It creates a strong, influential environment that neutralizes the negative influence of an underprivileged neighborhood, promotes social integration, and provides a broad range of extracurricular activities that may not be available in the home setting.

In 1996, there were 60 youth villages in Israel with a student population of 18,000.

A police studies track was established in 2004 at the Kanot Youth Village, and is now being offered at Nir Ha'emek Youth Village and Hodayot Youth Village. It has been shown that young people with low self-esteem thrive in such programs. Eighteen out of the twenty students at Kanot who studied in the police studies track, which includes criminology, sociology and horseback riding, graduated with a matriculation certificate.

== Youth villages in Israel ==
- Adanim
- Ahava
- Alonei Yitzhak
- Aluma
- Ayanot
- Beit Apple
- Ben Shemen
- Eshel HaNasi
- Givat Washington
- Hadassah Neurim
- Hadassim
- HaKfar HaYarok
- Hodayot
- Havat HaNoar HaTzioni (Israel Goldstein Youth Village)
- Kannot
- Kedma
- Kfar Batia
- Kfar HaNoar HaDati
- Kfar Silver
- Kiryat Ye'arim
- Magdiel
- Manof
- Meir Shfeya
- Mevo'ot Yam
- Mosenson
- Neve Amiel
- Neve Galim
- Neve Hadassah
- Nitzana
- Nitzanim (closed in 1990)
- Ramat Hadassah
- Yohana Jabotinsky
- Yemin Orde

== See also ==
- Hakhshara
- Gar'in
- Kibbutz volunteers
- Kibbutz communal child rearing and collective education
