= Rosemarie Esber =

American historian

Rosemarie M. Esber
- Born: Minnesota, United States
- Education: Johns Hopkins University; University of London (PhD)
- Occupations: Researcher, writer

Rosemarie M. Esber is a researcher and writer with degrees from the University of London and Johns Hopkins University with a background in the history, culture, and economy of the Middle East and North Africa. Her published work is centered on Arab oral history. She has served as a consultant to the United Nations, the World Bank, and the International Finance Corporation.

== Palestine and their Nakba ==
One of the main focuses of Esber's work has been the Palestinian accounts of their evacuation from their homes on the cusp of the Partition of Palestine which they refer to as the Nakba, or catastrophe. She is recognized for her book, Under the Cover of War: The Zionist Expulsion of the Palestinians. Of the book, Nur Masalha wrote, "Esber’s work both challenges and complements the archival historiography of 1948." Mustafa Kabha of Open University in Israel wrote in the International Journal of Middle East Studies, "Esber contributes significantly in further elucidating the Palestinian narrative of 1948" while still applying critical analysis to it. For the book, she interviewed 126 Palestinians, men and women who evacuated in 1948 and 1949 and found refuge in Jordan and Lebanon.

== Arab Americans in the Southern United States ==
Esber won the 2012-13 Charlton Oral History Research Grant from Baylor University for her proposal "Arab Americans in the Southern United States". Her aim is to contrast the perception that diversity is an inherently Northern urban phenomenon by documenting three waves of Arab immigration to America which began as early as the 1880s.

== Published works ==
=== Books ===
- War and Arab displacement in Mandate Palestine, 29 November 1947 to 15 May 1948 (2004, University of London)
- Under the Cover of War: The Zionist Expulsion of the Palestinians (2008, Arabicus Books)

=== Articles ===
- The Poet-King of Seville (January 1993, Saudi Aramco World)
- The 1948 Palestinian Arab Exodus from Haifa (2003, Arab World Geographer)
- Mainstreaming Gender in Selected HIV/AIDS Interventions in World Bank Operations in Africa. (December 2004, Review for World Bank Poverty Reduction Management & Gender Division (PRMGE))
- Rewriting The History of 1948: The Birth of the Palestinian Refugee Question Revisited (May 2005, Holy Land Studies: A Multidisciplinary Journal)
