= Hogla =

Hogla may refer to:

- Hogla, Bangladesh
- Hogla, Israel
- Hoglah, one of the five daughters of Zelophehad.
