= Elyakhin =

Town in central Israel

Elyakhin: אֶלְיָכִין; أليخين
- Local council (from 1977)
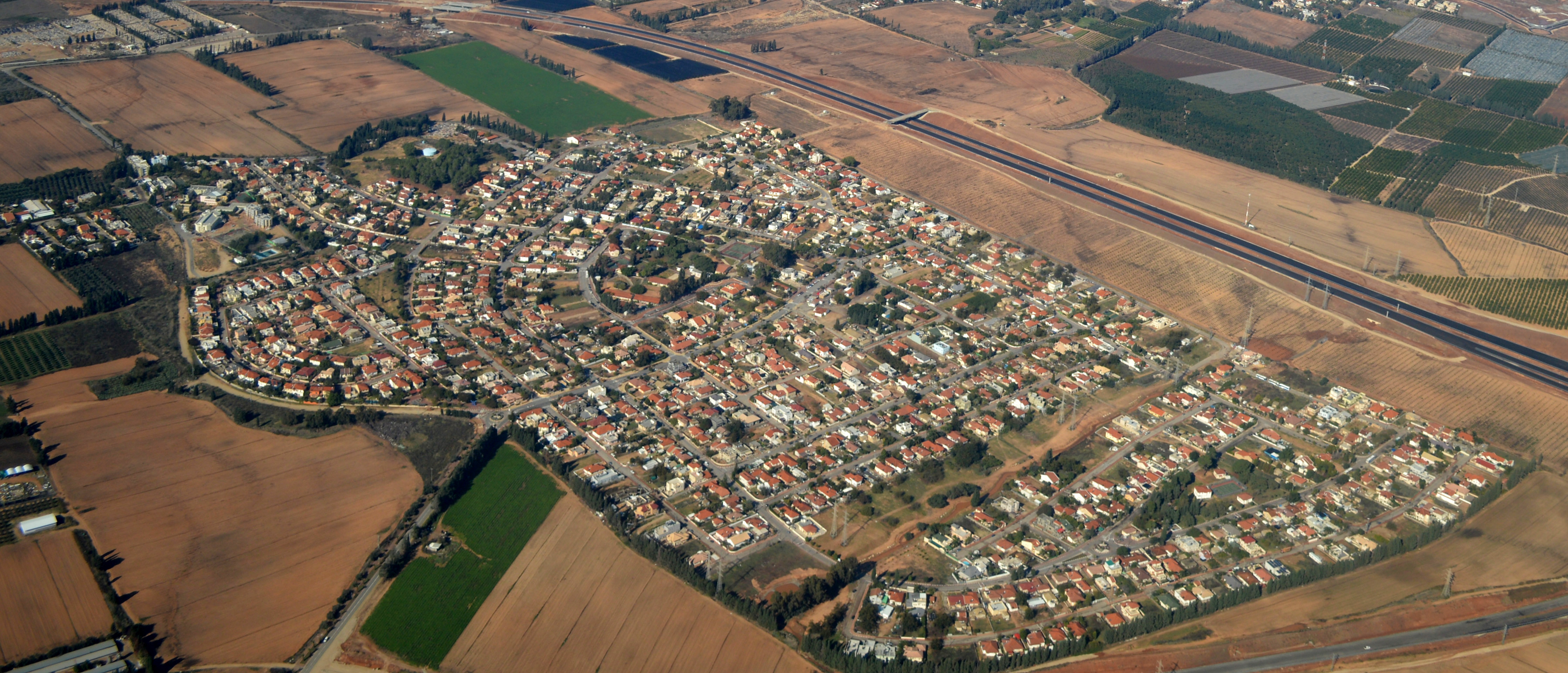
- Aerial view of Elyakhin

- Location within Central Israel Location within Israel
- Coordinates: 32°24′31″N 34°55′29″E
- Country: Israel
- District: Central
- Subdistrict: HaSharon
- Natural Region: Western Sharon
- Founded: 1950

Government
  - Head of Municipality: Azouri Sharoni

Area
  - Total: 1,660 dunams (1.66 km^{2}; 0.64 sq mi)

Population (2024)
  - Total: 3,855
  - Density: 2,320/km^{2} (6,010/sq mi)
- Name meaning: God will prepare

Elyakhin (Hebrew: אֶלְיָכִין) is a local council (town) in the Sharon region of the Central District of Israel. Located just south of Hadera and bordering the Emek Hefer Regional Council, it is accessible by local road 5812. With a jurisdiction of 1,600 dunams, it had a population of 3,855 in 2024.

== History ==
Elyakhin was founded in 1950 as an immigrant interim housing camp (ma'abara) near the site of the former Palestinian village of Khirbat Zalafa. It has a symbolic name, meaning "God will prepare", i.e. God prepared the land for the settlement of Jewish immigrants. The ma'abara eventually became an agricultural community (moshav), settled entirely by immigrants from Yemen.

== Geography and structure ==
Elyakhin is bordered by Hadera in the north and the Hefer Valley Regional Council in the south. The adjacent villages in the regional council are Herev Le'et, Hibat Tzion and Givat Haim (Ihud). Elyakhin's average elevation is 30 meters (98 ft).

Elyakhin consists of the eastern part of the town, as well as three western neighborhoods – HaAlonim ('The Oaks'), HaShikmim ('The Sycamores'), and HaOranim ('The Pines' or 'The Ashes').

== Public structures ==
Elyakhin has 11 synagogues, five of which are adjacent and located in the center of the town. Three more are located on the sides of HaBanim Park on the eastern part.

Elyakhin also has a community center and public library in the town's center.

== Voting Patterns ==
In the 2022 election, 74 percent of voters in Elyakhin voted for the parties of the right-wing coalition led by Benjamin Netanyahu, while 23 percent voted for the parties of the center-left coalition led by Yair Lapid. The Arab parties did not receive any support.

In the 2026 election, 70 percent of voters in Elyakhin voted for the parties of the right-wing coalition led by Benjamin Netanyahu, while 24 percent voted for the parties of the center-left coalition led by Gadi Eisenkot and 0.1 percent voted for the Arab parties. An additional 3.8 percent voted for the Reservists, and 1.9 percent voted for Amcha Yisrael. Voter turnout increased 11 percent from the 2022 election.
