= Havatzelet HaSharon =

Moshav in central Israel

Havatzelet HaSharon: חֲבַצֶּלֶת הַשָּׁרוֹן (Hebrew); هفاتسيلت هشارون (Arabic)
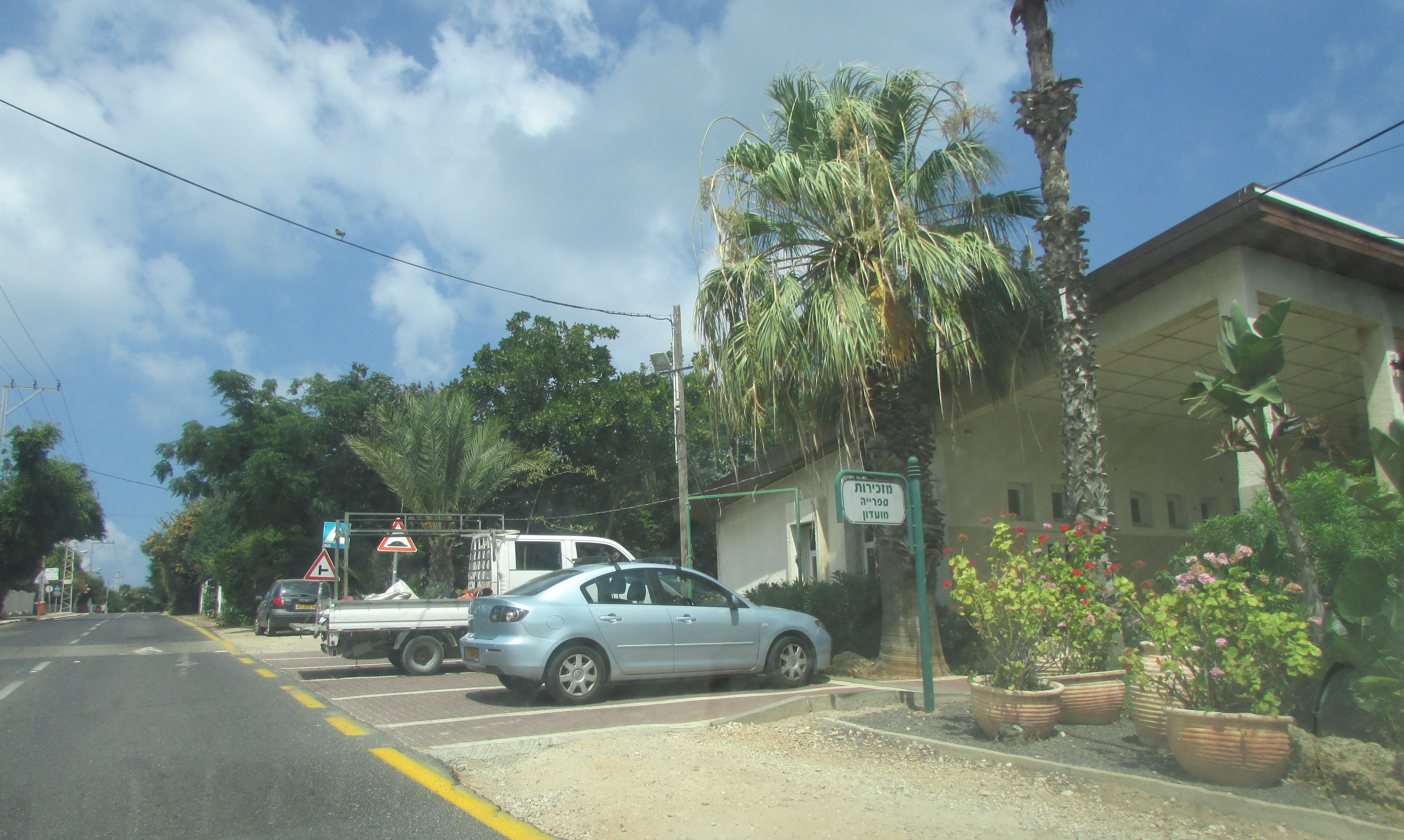
- Etymology: 'Rose of Sharon'
- Location within Central Israel Location within Israel
- Coordinates: 32°21′37″N 34°51′42″E
- Country: Israel
- District: Central
- Subdistrict: HaSharon
- Council: Hefer Valley
- Affiliation: Agricultural Union
- Founded: 1935
- Founder: Polish immigrants
- Population (2024): 410

Havatzelet HaSharon (Hebrew: חֲבַצֶּלֶת הַשָּׁרוֹן) is a moshav in central Israel. Located on the Mediterranean coast in the Sharon plain just north of Netanya, it falls under the jurisdiction of Hefer Valley Regional Council. In 2024 it had a population of 410.

== History and etymology ==
The moshav was founded in 1935 by Jewish immigrants from Poland, and was named after Lillian Freiman, the wife of Aharon (Archibald Jacob, "Archie") Freiman (for whom the adjacent moshav Bitan Aharon is named), a leader of the World Zionist Organization in Canada and an advisor to Yehoshua Hankin. The two were instrumental in raising the funds to purchase Emek Hefer (the Hefer valley) in the 1920s and to make it available for Jewish settlement.

Havatzelet HaSharon is a flower mentioned in the Hebrew bible that is translated in the English bible as the Rose of Sharon. ("I am a rose of Sharon, a lily of the valleys." –Song of Songs 2:1.) The neighbouring village Shoshanat HaAmakim ("lily of the valleys") is named after the second part of this verse. It is uncertain which actual flower is referred to in the Biblical verse, with a common interpretation being a lily (and hence the connection with Mrs. Lillian Freiman), although in modern Hebrew meaning Havatzelet HaSharon is more commonly associated with the sea daffodil, a coastal plant native to the area.

== Notable people ==
- Yuval Freilich (born 1995), épée fencer, 2019 European Epee Champion
- Amos Lapidot (1934–2019), Israeli fighter pilot, 10th Commander of the Israeli Air Force, and President of the Technion – Israel Institute of Technology
