= David Bannett =

American-Israeli electronics engineer (1921–2022)

- דוד בנעט
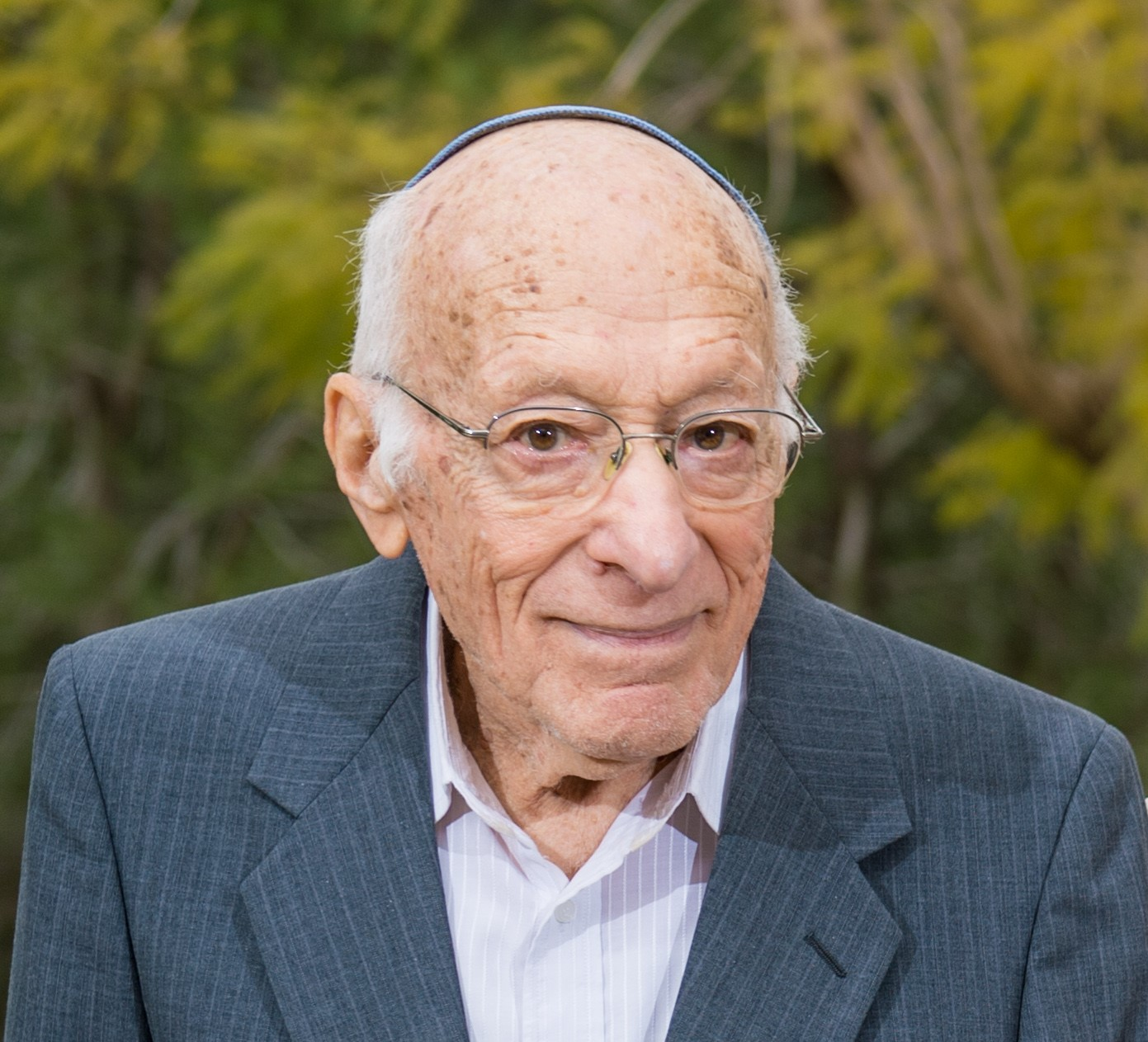
- Bannett in 2019
- Born: 29 October 1921; New York City, U.S.
- Died: 26 January 2022 (aged 100); Kfar Haroeh, Israel
- Education: City College of New York
- Occupation: Electronics engineer

David Rephael Bannett (Hebrew: דוד רפאל בנעט; 29 October 1921 – 26 January 2022) was an American-Israeli electronics engineer, a pioneer in radar technologies in the Israel Air Force, a clandestine buyer for the Haganah in the US, one of the first engineers in the Israeli electronics industry in the country's first years, and the inventor of Shabbat elevators. Bannett was the first lecturer of electronics in the Department of Physics at Bar Ilan University and the Jerusalem College of Technology and was one of the founders of the Beit Hazon neighborhood in Kfar Haroeh.

== Biography ==
David Rephael ("Daniel") Bannett was born in New York, to William and Esther (Tack) Bannett, both born in the US. He learned at a public school and in the afternoons studied at a Talmud Torah. When he reached bar mitzvah, he began to keep mitzvot. In 1937, he graduated from Abraham Lincoln High School at age 16 and studied mathematics, physics and engineering at the City College of New York. During World War II, he worked in the United States Army as a radar systems instructor, a technology that was classified and innovative at that time. Before the 1947–1949 Palestine war, he was recruited as a clandestine buyer for the Haganah.

Bannett immigrated to Israel in 1949 with his two children and wife, Esther Chana, who united with her family in Israel. Esther Chana was the daughter of Sarah Malka, president of the United Mizrachi Women in Washington Heights, and Shemaryahu Cohen Margolis, from the Old Yishuv in Jerusalem, who escaped to the US with the outbreak of World War I and headed the World Mizrachi Movement there. He later became one of the heads of the Ministry of Religious Affairs in Israel and a Yakir Yerushalayim.

Bannett was recruited to the Israel Defense Forces in a civilian position, serving as a "chief technical radar officer" for several years. When immigrating to Israel, Bannett's family joined a group from Hashomer Hadati. They settled in Kibbutz Kfar Darom, which was evacuated from the Gaza Strip during the War of Independence and became Moshav Bnei Darom in current times. In the mid-1950s Bannett founded the Beit Hazon neighborhood in Kfar Haroeh, together with his friends Shimshon Novick and David Shamir, after part of the hill was allocated for immigrants from English speaking countries.

Bannett was the first electronics engineer at Tadir, a company that later merged with Ran, becoming Tadiran. He later worked at Elco, advising the security industry, the Israeli Security Agency (Shabak) and Mossad. He worked for many years combining technology and halacha (Jewish law), as described extensively further on. Bannett was the first lecturer in electronics at Bar Ilan University, where he served as an outsourcing lecturer from the inception of the university until 1994. In addition, he was a member of the original staff at the Jerusalem College of Technology, which was a technological college at the time. Bannett was known as a shofar blower, with a record of 82 continuous years in this position.

== Purchasing in the service of the Haganah and the Israel Air Force ==
Based on his expertise in radar, which Bannett acquired as a radar instructor in the U.S. Army during World War II, he was recruited by the Haganah as a radar expert and joined Teddy Kollek's team in New York. He opened a radar course for Haganah fighters who were studying in the US and started up a business for purchasing radar and communication devices from the US army's surplus. At the time, the US had placed an embargo on supplying military equipment to the fighters in the War of Independence, so all purchasing activities were clandestine under the cover of legal activity. Among other things, Bannett smuggled a barge with diverse military equipment, including dismantled P-51 Mustang fighter aircraft, onto a boat outside the USA's territorial waters, with the equipment registered in his name. The barge was intercepted by the FBI's coastal guard and Bannett was forced to escape from the US for a while until the case subsided. When immigrating to Israel in 1949, and following his service in the Haganah, Bannett was appointed the Israel Air Force's chief technical radar officer, a position he filled until the mid-1950s.

== Technology and Halacha: Shabbat elevators and other challenges ==
Bannett was the first engineer of the Scientific and Technological Institute of Halacha, headed by Rabbi Levy Yitzhak Halperin. He developed the Shabbat elevator and greatly contributed to additional developments, such as telephones permitted for use in hospitals on Shabbat, grama devices permitted for use on Shabbat and a special door that enables Kohens to be present in hospitals without concern for the prohibition of being defiled by the dead. For many decades, Bannett travelled on a volunteer basis to Jewish communities around the world, providing advice on Shabbat elevators. Bannett was considered a major authority in this field by halachic judicial figures who permit using Shabbat elevators. Bannett contributed diagrams, plans and an article in English to Rabbi Halperin's book Shabbat Elevators.

== Personal life and death ==
Bannett was married for 75 years to Esther Chana, from 1945 until her death in 2021. They had four children. Bannett lived in Beit Hazon, in Kfar Haroeh, where they moved to in 1953. He died there on 26 January 2022, at the age of 100.
