= Shoshanat HaAmakim =

Community settlement in central Israel

Shoshanat HaAmakim: שׁוֹשַׁנַּת הָעֲמָקִים (Hebrew)
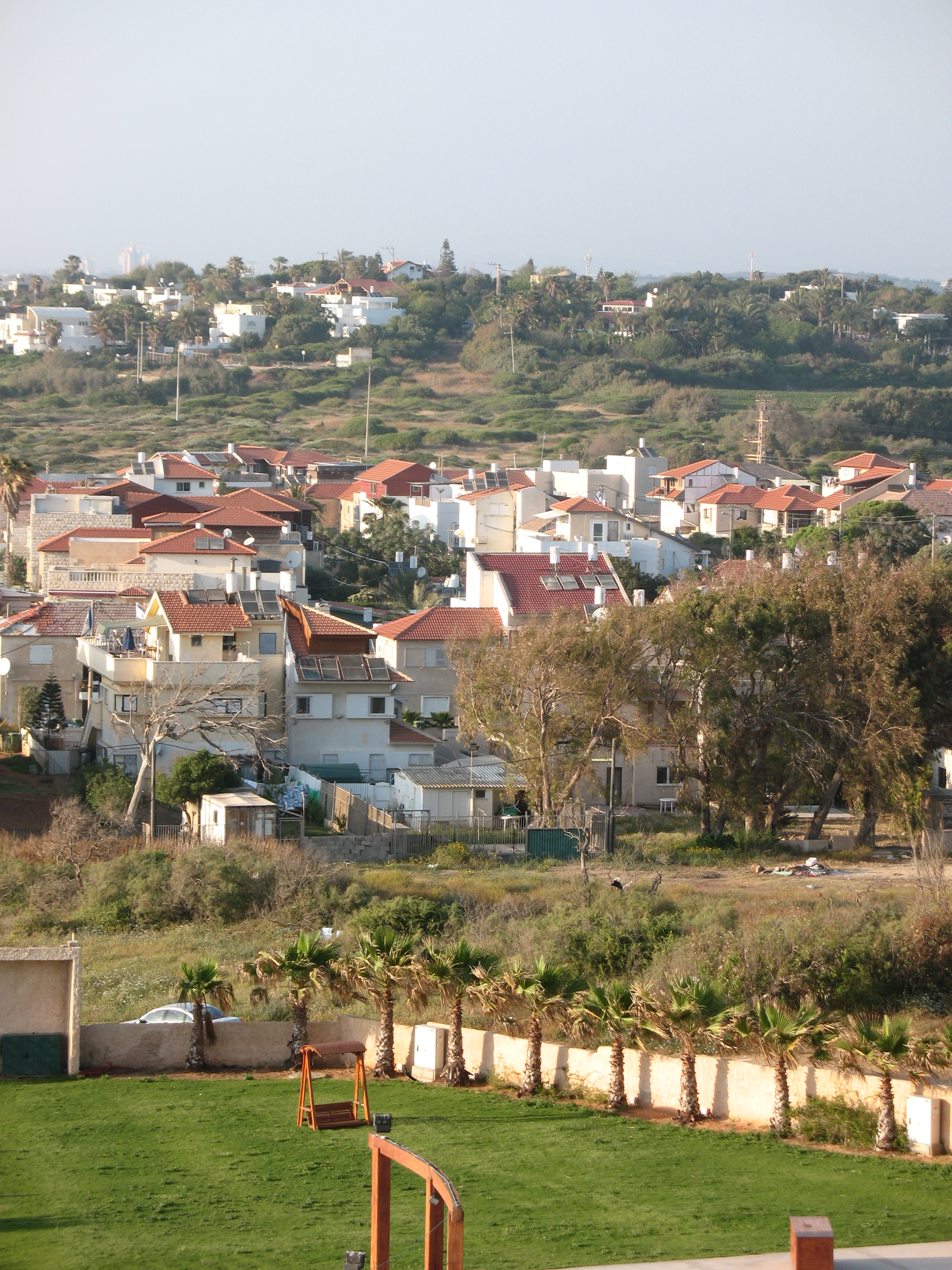
- Shoshanat HaAmakim, view from the south

- Location within Central Israel
- Coordinates: 32°21′14″N 34°51′24″E
- Country: Israel
- District: Central
- Subdistrict: HaSharon
- Council: Hefer Valley
- Founded: 1951
- Population (2024): 445

Shoshanat HaAmakim (Hebrew: שׁוֹשַׁנַּת הָעֲמָקִים, lit. 'Lily of the Valleys') is a community settlement in central Israel. Located to the north of Netanya, it falls under the jurisdiction of Hefer Valley Regional Council. In 2024 it had a population of 445.

== History ==
The village was established in 1951 and was built by the Rassco company. Its name is taken from the Song of Songs 2:1;

I am a rose of Sharon, a lily of the valleys. (From modern Hebrew, this can also be translated as "lily of Sharon, a rose of the valleys".)

The neighbouring moshav Havatzelet HaSharon ("rose/lily of Sharon") is named after the first part of this verse.
