= Givat Shapira =

Moshav in central Israel

Givat Shapira: גִּבְעַת שַׁפִּירָא (Hebrew); جفعات شابيرا (Arabic)
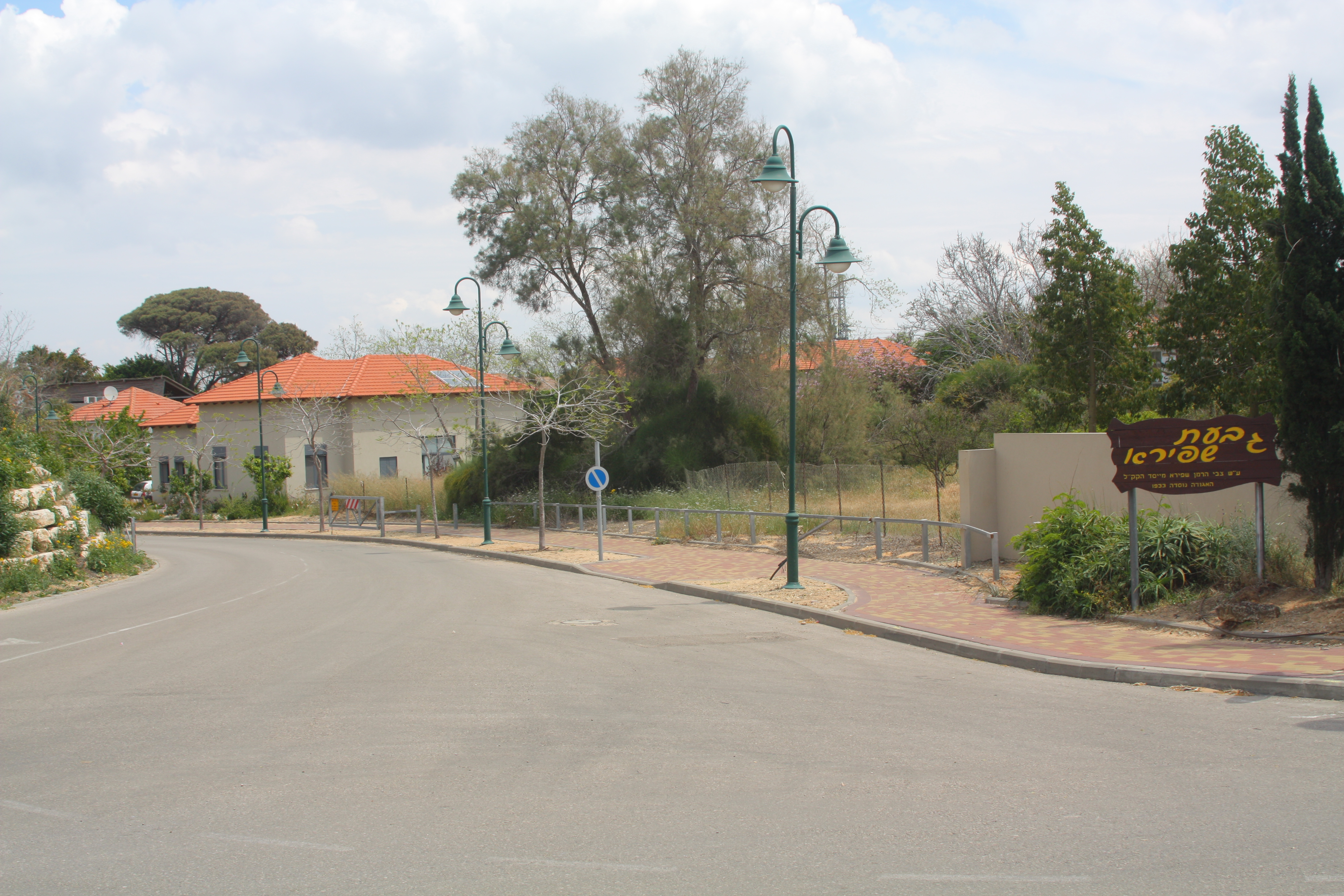
- Village entrance

- Location within Central Israel
- Coordinates: 32°21′28″N 34°52′30″E
- Country: Israel
- District: Central
- Subdistrict: HaSharon
- Council: Hefer Valley
- Affiliation: Agricultural Union
- Founded: 1958
- Population (2024): 366

Givat Shapira (Hebrew: גִּבְעַת שַׁפִּירָא, lit. Shapiro Hill) is a moshav in central Israel. Located in the Sharon plain near Netanya, it falls under the jurisdiction of Hefer Valley Regional Council. In 2024 it had a population of 366.

== History ==
The moshav was founded in 1958 and was named in honour of Zvi Hermann Schapira, the man who suggested the establishment of the Jewish National Fund.
