= Hefer Valley Regional Council =

Regional council in Central Israel

Coordinates: 32°21′N 34°55′E

Hefer Valley עמק חפר وادي حيفر
- Regional council (from 1940)
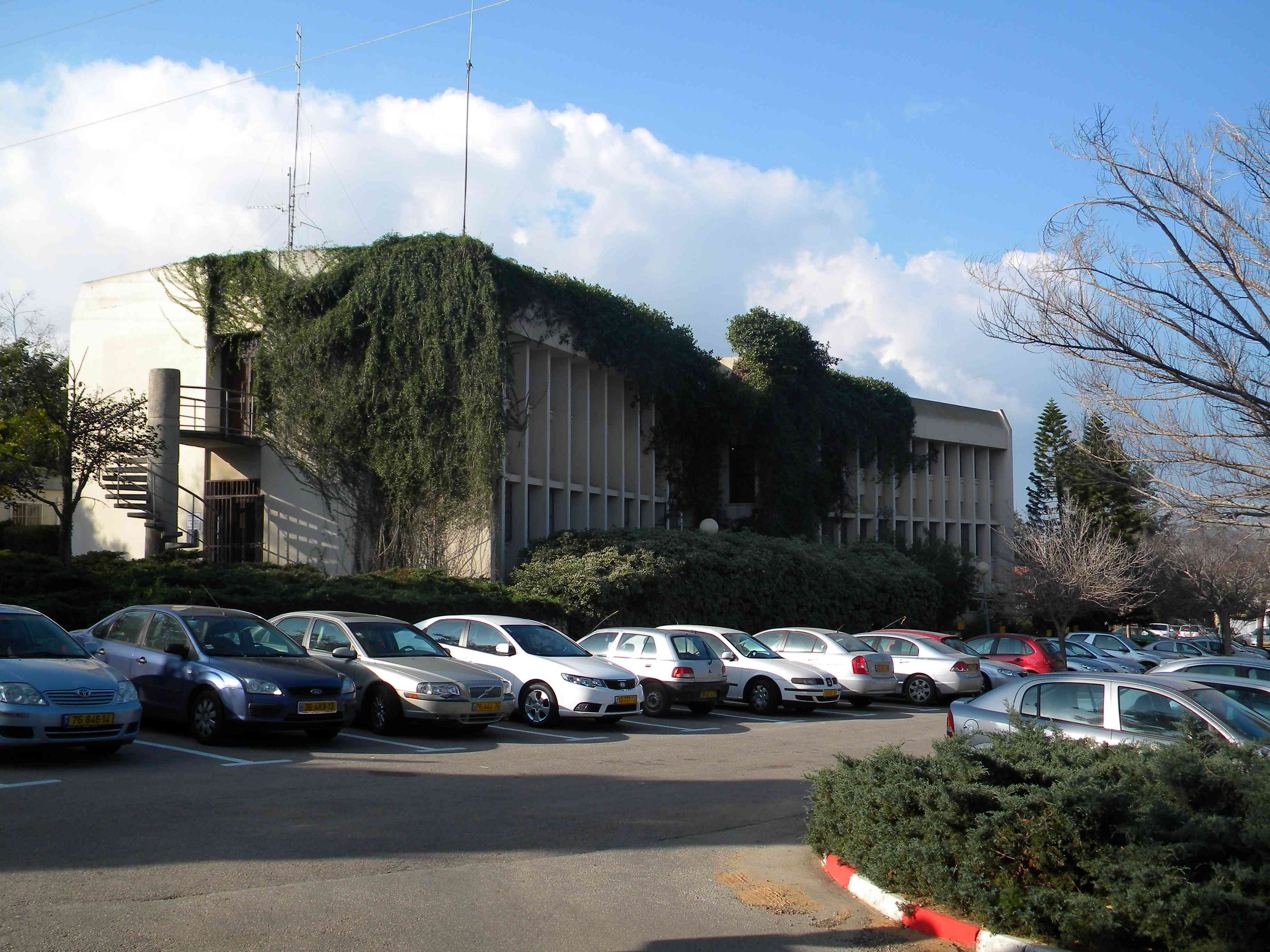
- Emek Hefer Regional Council building

- Interactive map of Hefer Valley
- Country: Israel
- District: Central
- Subdistrict: HaSharon
- Natural region: Eastern Sharon, Western Sharon

Government
  - Head of Municipality: Galit Shaul

Area
  - Total: 127,940 dunams (127.94 km^{2}; 49.40 sq mi)

Population (2024)
  - Total: 42,931
  - Density: 335.56/km^{2} (869.09/sq mi)
- Website: Official website

The Hefer Valley Regional Council (Hebrew: מועצה אזורית עמק חפר, Mo'atza Azorit Emek Hefer) is a regional council in the Sharon region of the Central District of Israel. It is named after an administrative district in this area in the time of King Solomon (1 Kings 4:10).

The council covers an area adjacent to Hadera in the north, to Netanya in the south, to the Mediterranean in the west and to Tulkarm and the Green Line in the east. As of 2024, the jurisdiction area of the council has a population of 42,931 people.

The Regional Council offices are located near Kfar Monash, at the Ruppin junction, next to the Ruppin Academic Center.

== History ==
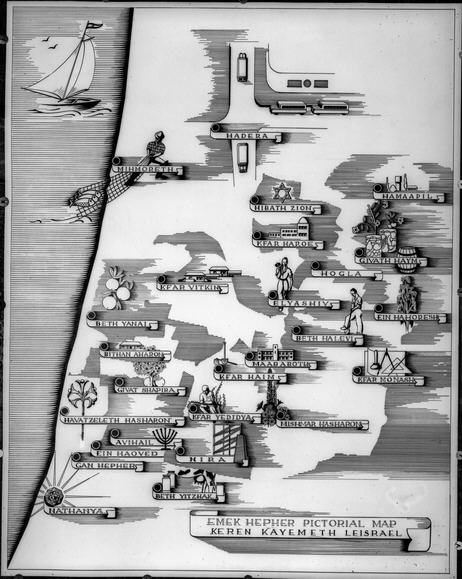
Hefer Valley (Emek Hefer), 1947 JNF map

In the early 1900s, a local midwife, Olga Hankin, reported information about the economic state of the families in the region to her husband, Yehoshua Hankin, who was in charge of land purchase for the Jewish National Fund (JNF). In 1927, Yehoshua Hankin resolved the complex legal issues involved in purchasing the land, and signed an agreement for the purchase of the Hefer Valley. The only difficulty was that the JNF did not have sufficient funds to pay the sum needed for buying the land. The chairman of the JNF, Menachem Ussishkin, set out on a fundraising trip to Canada, returning with $300,000 and undertakings to bring it up to a million, the sum required to purchase the Hefer Valley over a period of seven years. At the 16th Zionist Congress held in Zurich in 1929, Ussishkin announced that Emek Hefer was now in Jewish hands.

A group of 20 young members of the "Vitkin" and "Haemek" ('the valley') movements settled in the newly purchased valley. They moved into an abandoned building and began draining the swamps and preparing the land for agriculture.

In April 1933, they built their first houses at Kfar Vitkin, in the heart of the valley. In 1931, a group from the Hashomer Hatzair movement in Hadera established the settlement of Ein HaHoresh, planting the first citrus grove.

A company called "Yachin" prepared plantations for settlers from abroad. Another group from the Kibbutz HaMeuhad movement, founded Givat Haim in 1932, while the organization of demobilized soldiers from the Jewish Brigade set up the settlement of Avihayil.

Ruppin Academic Center was established in the region in 1949.

== List of communities ==
=== Kibbutzim ===
- Bahan
- Ein HaHoresh
- Givat Haim (Ihud)
- Givat Haim (Meuhad)
- HaMa'apil
- HaOgen
- Ma'abarot
- Mishmar HaSharon
- Yad Hana

=== Moshavim ===
- Ahituv
- Avihayil
- Be'erotayim
- Beit HaLevi
- Beit Herut
- Beit Yanai
- Beit Yitzhak-Sha'ar Hefer
- Beitan Aharon
- Burgata
- Eliashiv
- Elyakhin
- Gan Yoshiya
- Geulei Teiman
- Givat Shapira
- Hadar Am
- Haniel
- Havatzelet HaSharon
- Herev Le'et
- Hibat Tzion
- Hogla
- Kfar Haim
- Kfar Haroeh
- Kfar Monash
- Kfar Vitkin
- Kfar Yedidia
- Mikhmoret
- Olesh
- Ometz

=== Community settlements ===
- Bat Hen
- Bat Hefer
- Beit Hazon
- Hofit
- Shoshanat HaAmakim
- Tzukei Yam

=== Youth villages ===
- Hadassah Neurim
- Mevo'ot Yam

== Demographics ==
Historical population
Year	Pop.	±%
1972	15,200	—
1983	17,800	+17.1%
1995	22,200	+24.7%
2008	35,020	+57.7%
2022	41,825	+19.4%
2024	42,931	+2.6%

== Voting Patterns ==
In the 2022 election, 81 percent of voters in the regional council voted for the parties of the center-left coalition led by Yair Lapid, while 18 percent voted for the parties of the right-wing coalition led by Benjamin Netanyahu and 1 percent voted for the Arab parties.

In the 2026 election, 79 percent of voters in the regional council voted for the parties of the center-left coalition led by Gadi Eisenkot, while 16 percent voted for the parties of the right-wing coalition led by Benjamin Netanyahu and 0.6 percent voted for the Arab parties. An additional 3 percent voted for the Reservists, and 1.4 percent voted for Amcha Yisrael. Voter turnout increased 15 percent from the 2022 election.
