= Beit HaLevi =

Moshav in central Israel

Beit HaLevi: בֵּית הַלֵּוִי (Hebrew)
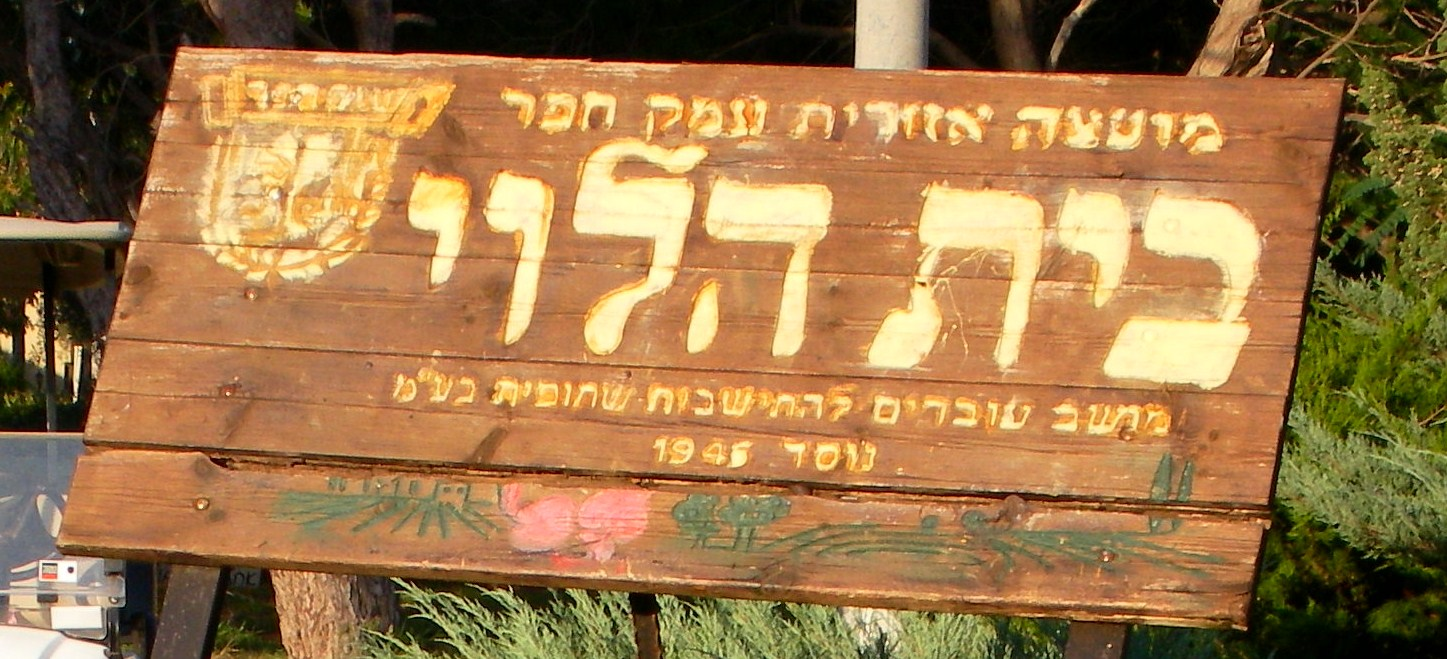
- Etymology: House of the Levite
- Location within Central Israel Location within Israel
- Coordinates: 32°21′13″N 34°55′53″E
- Country: Israel
- District: Central
- Subdistrict: HaSharon
- Council: Hefer Valley
- Affiliation: Moshavim Movement
- Founded: 1945
- Founder: Immigrants from the Balkans
- Population (2024): 837

Beit HaLevi (Hebrew: בֵּית הַלֵּוִי, lit. 'House of the Levite') is a moshav in central Israel. Located in the Sharon plain near Netanya, it falls under the jurisdiction of Hefer Valley Regional Council. In 2024 it had a population of 837.

== History ==
The moshav was founded in 1945 by Jewish immigrants from the Balkans, and was named after Yehuda Halevi.
