= Avihayil =

Moshav in central Israel

Avihayil: אֲבִיחַיִל (Hebrew); أفيحئيل (Arabic)
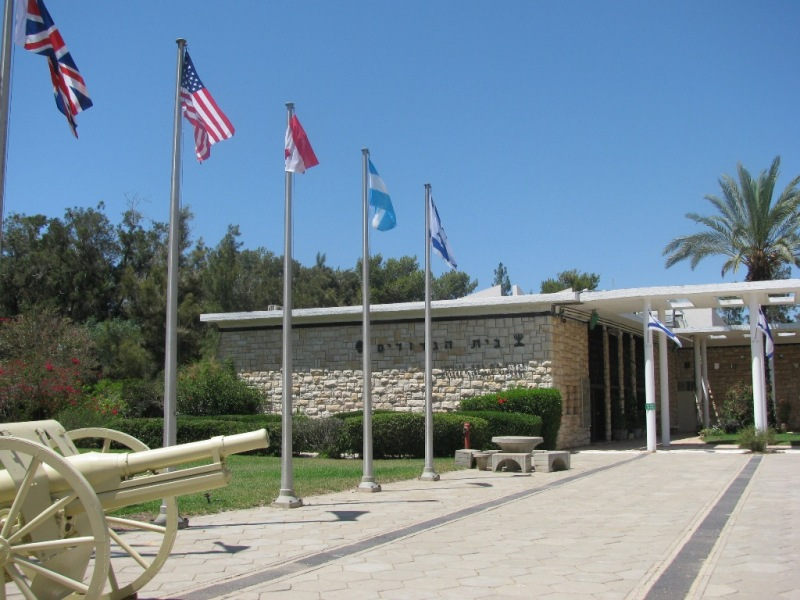

- Location within Central Israel Location within Israel
- Coordinates: 32°21′1″N 34°52′20″E
- Country: Israel
- District: Central
- Subdistrict: HaSharon
- Council: Hefer Valley
- Affiliation: Moshavim Movement
- Founded: July 19, 1932
- Founder: Jewish Legion veterans
- Population (2024): 1,269

Avihayil (Hebrew: אֲבִיחַיִל, lit. Father of strength) is a moshav in central Israel. Located to the north-east of Netanya, it falls under the jurisdiction of Hefer Valley Regional Council. In 2024 it had a population of 1,269.

== Name ==
The moshav was named after the biological father of biblical Esther (Esther 2:15).

== History ==
In 1921, Jewish veterans of the British Army during World War I settled on desert land allocated to it by the British Mandate government in the northeastern Negev, near Tel Arad. However, the settlement was abandoned after no water was found.

As part of the Settlement of the Thousand scheme, a new village was founded in the Emek Hefer on 19 July 1932 on a stretch of sand dunes on land owned by the Jewish National Fund. The founders were veterans of the Zion Mule Corps and the Jewish Legion, battalions of the British Army that had fought under the command of Lieutenant-Colonel John Henry Patterson, a vocal Zionist advocate and the "godfather of the Israeli army". Colonel Patterson visited the moshav in 1937, and in his last years expressed his desire to be buried in Israel with his men.

In 1946 Avihayil merged with the neighboring moshav, Ein HaOved. The founders were immigrants from Canada, Russia and the United States, as well as several natives of Eretz Israel. In 1947, Avihayil had a population of 600. In 1967 there were 605 inhabitants, and its economy was based on intensive mixed farming including citrus. It established "Beit HaGedudim", a museum of the Jewish Legion and clubhouse for veterans.

Colonel Patterson died in California in 1947, less than a year before the establishment of the State of Israel, and was interred at Angelus-Rosedale Cemetery in Los Angeles. In 2014, Patterson's ashes were brought to Israel and buried at the moshav cemetery, in the presence of Prime Minister Benjamin Netanyahu and other dignitaries.

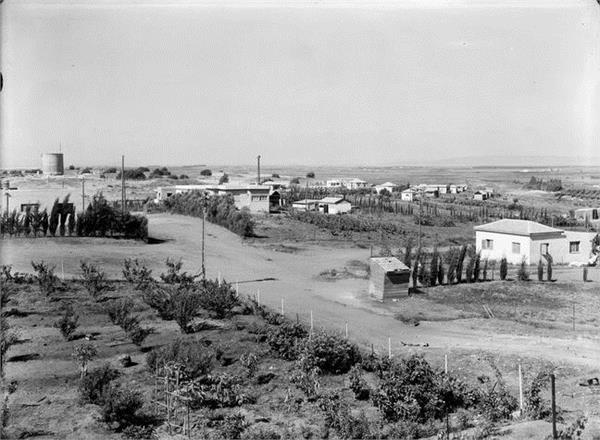
Avihayil 1939 (top of map)

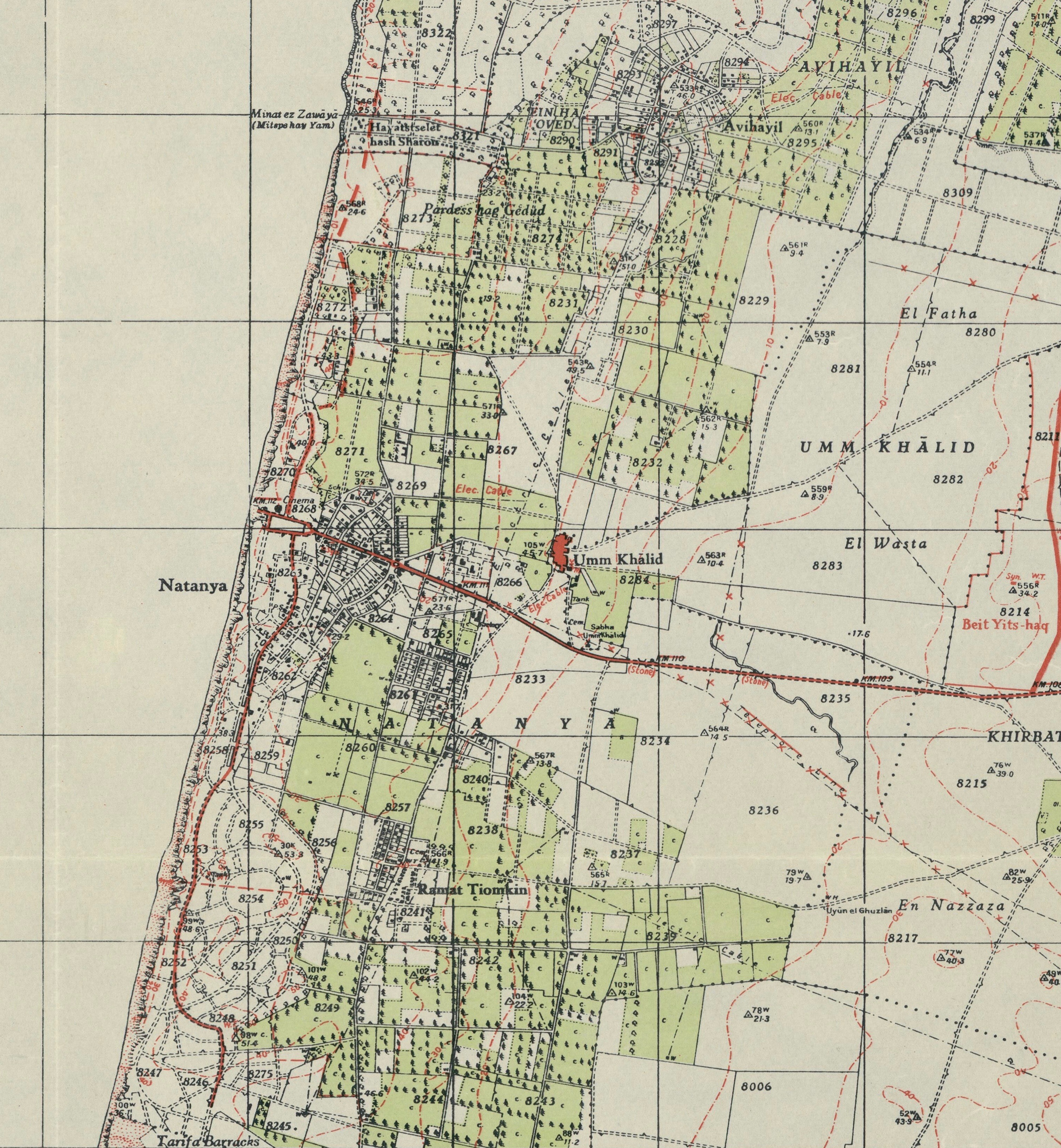
Avihayil 1939 1:20,000

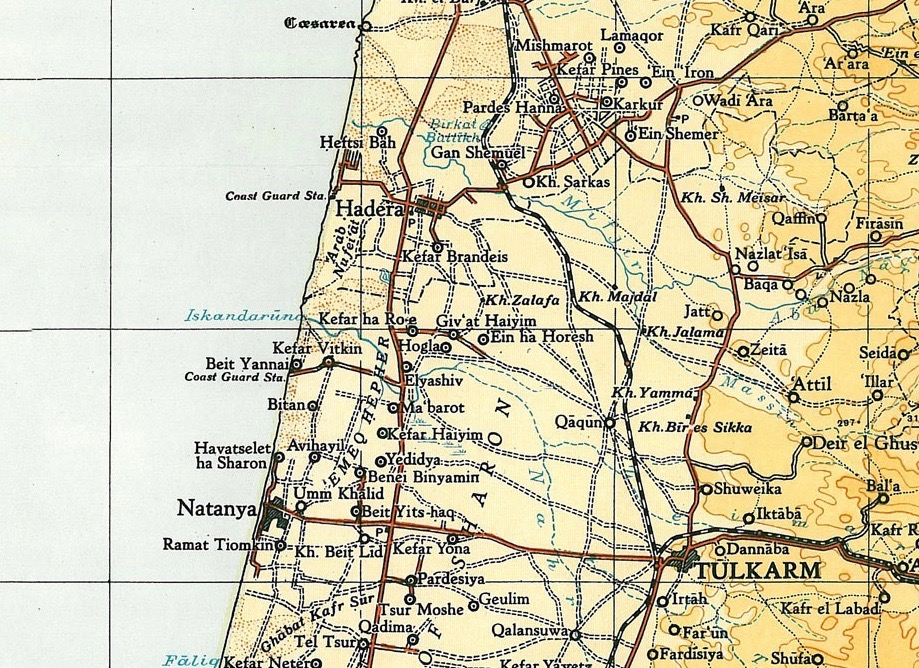
Avihayil 1945 1:250,000 (NE of Natanya)

== Notable residents ==
- Sharon Kantor (born 2003), world champion windsurfer and Olympic silver medalist
- Gabi Neumark (1946–2000), basketball player

== See also ==
- Sholem Schwarzbard (1886–1938), Yiddish poet, soldier, anarchist; buried in the cemetery of Moshav Avihail
