= Bat Hen =

Community settlement in central Israel

Bat Hen: בת חן (Hebrew)
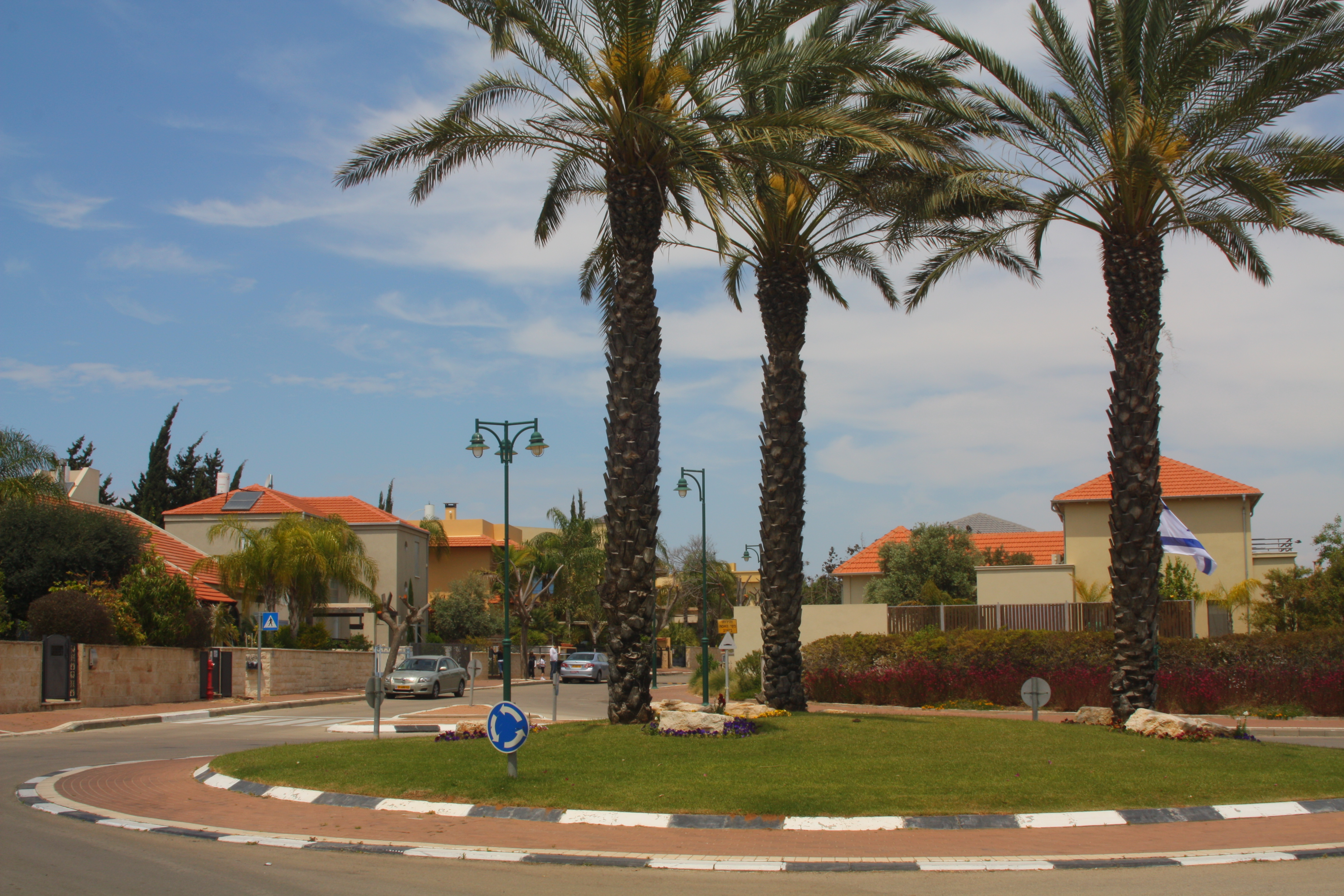
- Etymology: Daughter of Grace
- Location within Central Israel Location within Israel
- Coordinates: 32°21′37″N 34°52′18″E
- Country: Israel
- District: Central
- Subdistrict: HaSharon
- Council: Hefer Valley
- Founded: 1967
- Population (2024): 449

Bat Hen (Hebrew: בת חן, lit. 'Daughter of Grace') is a community settlement in central Israel. Located on the coast of the Mediterranean Sea, it falls under the jurisdiction of Hefer Valley Regional Council. In 2024 it had a population of 449.

== History ==
Founded in 1967, the village is named after a flower. For a while it split into two settlements, Bat Hen Alef and Bat Hen Bet, though they later merged back into one.
