= Bat Hefer =

Community settlement in central Israel

Bat Hefer: בת חפר (Hebrew)
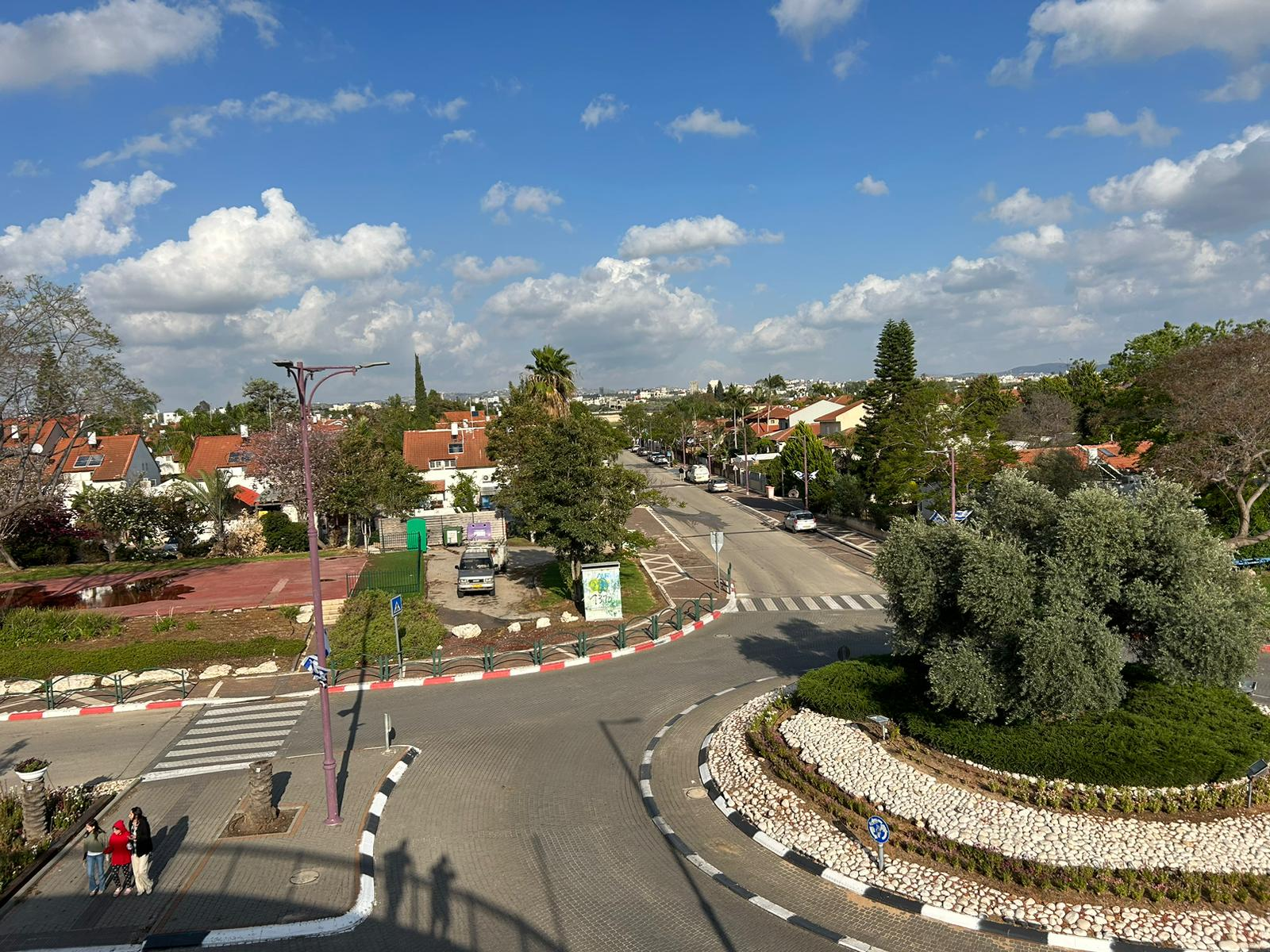

- Location within Central Israel
- Coordinates: 32°19′58″N 35°0′50″E
- Country: Israel
- District: Central
- Subdistrict: HaSharon
- Council: Hefer Valley
- Founded: 1996
- Population (2024): 4,865

Bat Hefer (Hebrew: בת חפר, lit. 'Daughter of Hefer') is a community settlement in the Sharon plain in Israel. Located east of Netanya and adjacent to two kibbutzim; Bahan and Yad Hana, it covers 1,000 dunams and falls under the jurisdiction of the Hefer Valley Regional Council. The village is between Highway 6 to the west and the Green Line on the east. In 2024 it had a population of 4,865.

== Etymology ==
Bat Hefer is named after "Hefer," an administrative district in this area with a district chief in the time of King Solomon (1 Kings 4:10).

== History ==
Bat Hefer was founded as "Sokho" and named after the ancient town by the same name. Construction of the modern village began in 1995, and the first residents moved in during 1996. It was built as part of the Seven Stars project.

On 22 May 2024 several Hamas militants opened fire at the Bat Hefer from the nearby West Bank city of Tulkarm causing damage but no casualties.

== Voting Patterns ==
In the 2022 election, 72 percent of voters in Bat Hefer voted for the parties of the center-left coalition led by Yair Lapid, while 25 percent voted for the parties of the right-wing coalition led by Benjamin Netanyahu and 0.2 percent voted for the Arab parties.

In the 2026 election, 73 percent of voters in Bat Hefer voted for the parties of the center-left coalition led by Gadi Eisenkot, while 21 percent voted for the parties of the right-wing coalition led by Benjamin Netanyahu and 0.2 percent voted for the Arab parties. An additional 4.2 percent voted for the Reservists, and 1.5 percent voted for Amcha Yisrael. Voter turnout increased 18 percent from the 2022 election.
