= Star Settlements =

Settlements in Israel

The 7 Stars Plan | Map of Settlements

The Star Settlements (יישובי הכוכבים), also known as The Seven Stars Plan are a series of communities that were established in Israel during the 1990s along the Green Line. Initially the program was to include the creation of seven new settlement projects, but would eventually see the construction of nine prior to the merging of several of these municipalities, changing the shape of the overall plan but not taking away from its original intended purpose. These settlements would eventually come to include communities of various sizes, and rural as well as suburban configurations. The original location of this project was set to be on the border of the Green Line, near central Israel and the Sharon plain.

== History ==
=== The Seven Star Plan ===
Then-Minister of Construction and Housing (משרד הבינוי והשיכון), Ariel Sharon, initially opposed the program because of concerns around inviting too much concrete into the pristine coastal plains- preferring instead to keep building Mitzpim in the Galilee and in the Negev.

Sharon, who had experience with construction as well as in the creation of outposts and settlements believed that over-construction was taking place in central Israel, and he viewed the dense concentration of new development projects in the center posed a security risk to a population who were vulnerable to missiles as well as from the harms that their concentration caused to local agricultural lands and water sources. Context for the project includes the earlier initiatives of the 1967 Allon Plan and 1977 Sharon Plan.

Despite starting off in opposition to this settlement plan, after Ariel Sharon had taken office as Minister of Construction and Housing in July 1990, he adopted and began to undertake the necessary steps to kickstart and promote the project. At tlaunch, then Director-General of the Ministry of Housing, Aryeh Bar, explained that the purpose of the program was to provide housing quickly, due to the wave of immigration from the former Soviet Union in the 1990s, and to meet the demand of young couples to live in single-family homes in central Israel. However, Member of Knesset Michael Eitan from Likud, one of the program’s initiators, explained that the intention was to connect the settlements in "western Samaria to the Star Settlements" which would create a territorial continuum on both sides of the Green Line, and that “building along the ridge axis creates an immediate connection between the settlers on the line and Samaria, erases the Green Line, and prevents progress toward a territorial compromise with the Palestinians”.

=== Establishment ===
In December 1990, the Israeli Cabinet Committee for Immigration and Absorption approved a large-scale initiative presented by the Ministry of Construction and Housing, commonly referred to as the “Seven Stars Plan” (תוכנית שבעת הכוכבים). The plan emerged in the context of the large immigration wave from the former Soviet Union and was designed to provide housing while simultaneously advancing territorial development along the Green Line. Proposed under Housing Minister Ariel Sharon, the plan envisioned a continuous belt of new Jewish towns stretching from Modi’in in the south to Mei Ami in Wadi ‘Ara in the north, largely aligned with the route of the future Trans-Israel Highway (Highway 6), which at the time was still in the planning stages.

The planning concept focused on establishing a “ridge axis” communities and settlements corridor linking suburban-communal towns along the western edge of the West Bank. The project was intended both to absorb population growth and to strengthen Jewish demographic presence in the area known as the “Little Triangle,” a region with a high concentration of Arab-Israeli towns near the Green Line. According to contemporary planning documents and later analyses, the plan envisioned a chain of settlements and development towns linked by transportation and industrial infrastructure, including approximately 14 industrial zones and a north–south highway connecting the new communities.

- Overall, the plan at that time encompassed the construction of 28,000 housing units, detailed as follows:
  - Givat HaBracha (in the Mei Ami area of Wadi ‘Ara) – 2,000 units;
  - Katzir A – 1,300 units;
  - Harish A – 6,000 units;
  - Yad Hana A – 1,400 units; became Bat Hefer.
  - Geulim A – 1,600 units;
  - Eyal A South – 2,300 units;
  - Tzur Natan A South – 1,100 units;
  - Mazor A – 6,500 units;
  - Shoham – 3,000 units;
  - Kfar Ruth A – 700 units;
  - and expansion of the existing settlement Sha’ar Ephraim.

The planning basis for the project was further elaborated in 1991 in the “Ridge Axis Plan” (תוכנית ציר הרכס), prepared by a planning team headed by regional planner Nahum Donsky for the Ministry of Construction and Housing. This planning document proposed the establishment of twelve new settlements together with the expansion of several existing ones, forming a continuous chain of suburban communities along the Green Line corridor. The strategy integrated residential development with transportation infrastructure, particularly the future Trans-Israel Highway, which was intended to serve as the central spine connecting the new settlements to Israel’s coastal metropolitan region.
