= Beit Herut =

Moshav in central Israel

Beit Herut: בֵּית חֵרוּת (Hebrew)
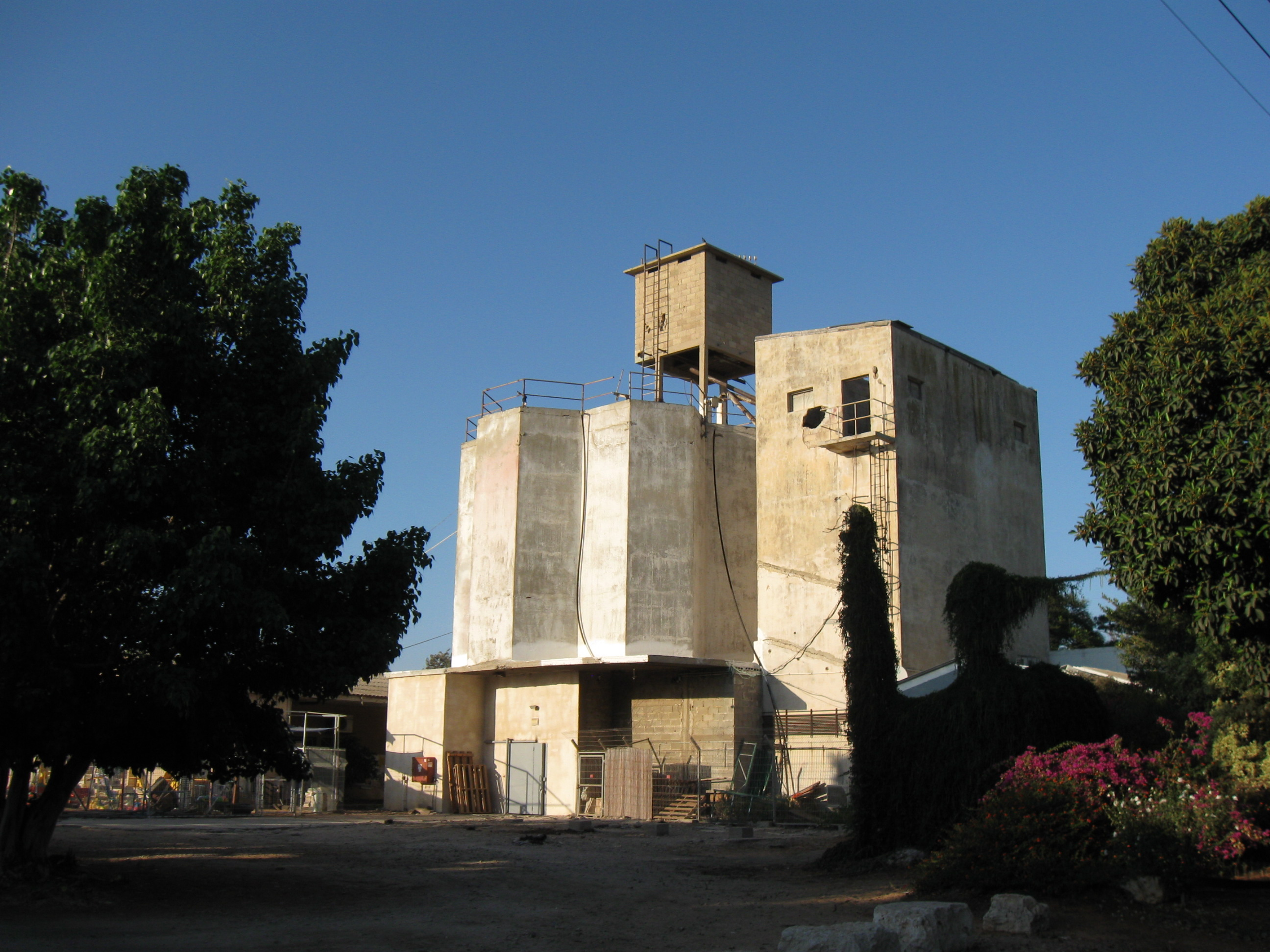
- Etymology: House of Freedom
- Location within Central Israel Location within Israel
- Coordinates: 32°22′40″N 34°52′8″E
- Country: Israel
- District: Central
- Subdistrict: HaSharon
- Council: Hefer Valley
- Affiliation: Moshavim Movement
- Founded: 1933
- Founder: American Jews
- Population (2024): 962

Beit Herut (Hebrew: בֵּית חֵרוּת, lit. 'House of Freedom') is a moshav in central Israel. Located in the Sharon plain between Hadera and Netanya, it falls under the jurisdiction of Hefer Valley Regional Council. In 2024 it had a population of 962.

== History ==
The first meeting of the Herut America Bet organisation that established the moshav was held on 27 and 28 August 1932 in Chelsea, Michigan. The association had 65 members from nineteen different cities in the United States. Herut America Bet contracted with Yachin, which undertook to develop the lands for a period of six years, the deadline set for members to emigrate to Palestine. The organisation intended to establish a workers' settlement where each person would cultivate only their own plot.

The moshav itself was founded in 1933 by and was initially named Herut America Bet, as the moshav now known as Herut was named Herut America Alef at the time. There was also a Herut America Gimel, which is today called Hadar Am.
