= Hen Lippin =

Israeli basketball player

Hen Lippin חן ליפין
Personal information
- Born: November 4, 1965 (age 61) Beitan Aharon, Israel

Hen Lippin (Hebrew: חן ליפין; born November 4, 1965, in Beitan Aharon), the youngest of three brothers, is a retired Israeli basketball player.

== Career ==
Hen Lippin joined Maccabi Tel Aviv in 1984, and played at the club for six seasons, wearing number 10. He later played for Maccabi Rishon LeZion and Hapoel Galil Elyon.
