= Hofit =

Community settlement in central Israel

Hofit: חופית (Hebrew)
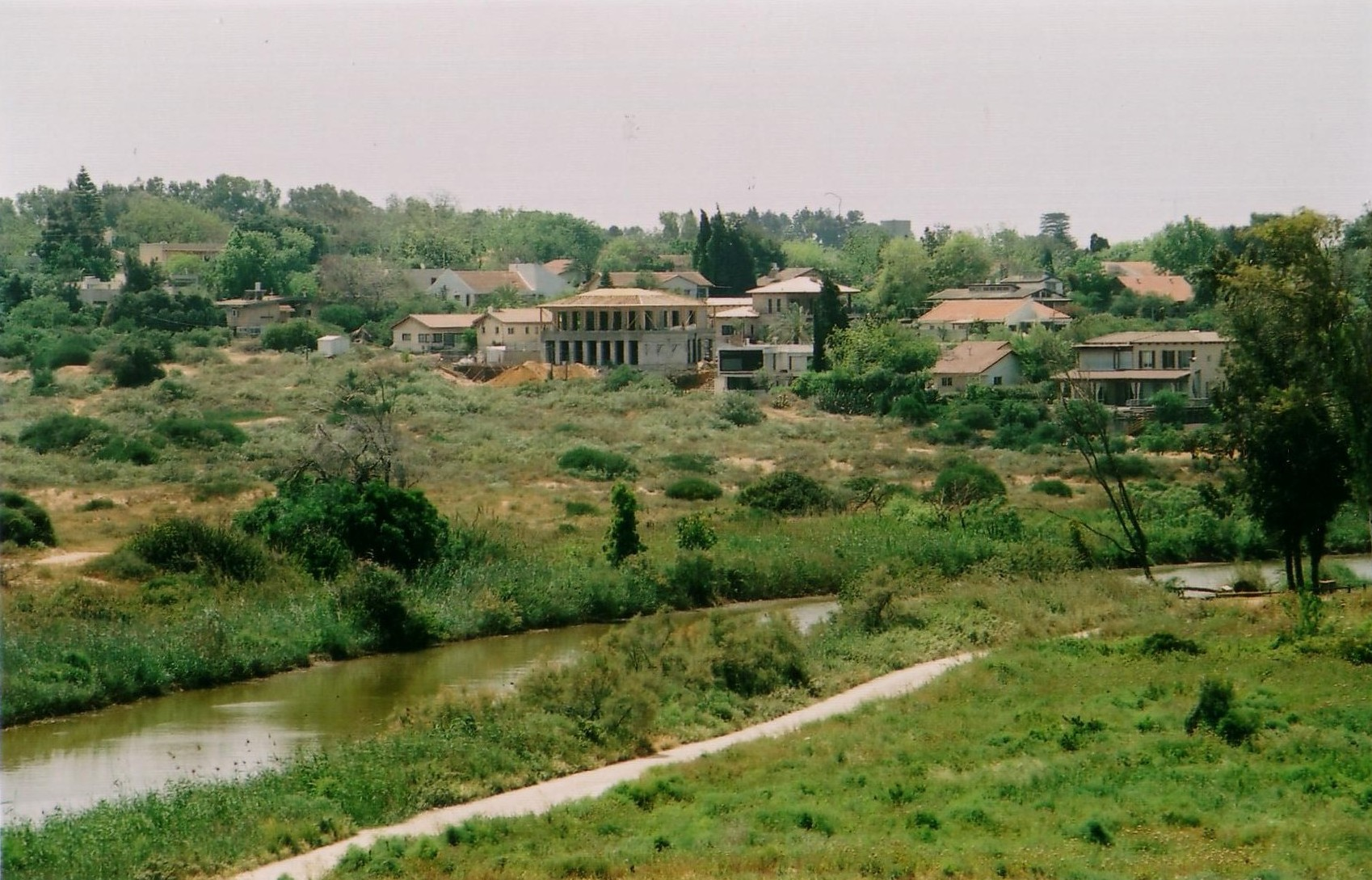

- Location within Central Israel
- Coordinates: 32°23′9″N 34°52′27″E
- Country: Israel
- District: Central
- Subdistrict: HaSharon
- Council: Hefer Valley
- Founded: 1952
- Population (2024): 887

Hofit (Hebrew: חופית, lit. 'Coastal') is a community settlement in central Israel on the coast of the Mediterranean Sea near Netanya, it falls under the jurisdiction of Hefer Valley Regional Council. In 2024 it had a population of 887.

== History ==
The village was established in the early 1950s for workers who wanted an agricultural lifestyle. The first residents moved in 1952, and the village was officially recognised in 1955. Its name is taken from its proximity to the sea.

== Notable residents ==
- Lee Korzits, Olympic and world champion windsurfer
