= Ofer Shechter =

Israeli actor

- עפר שכטר
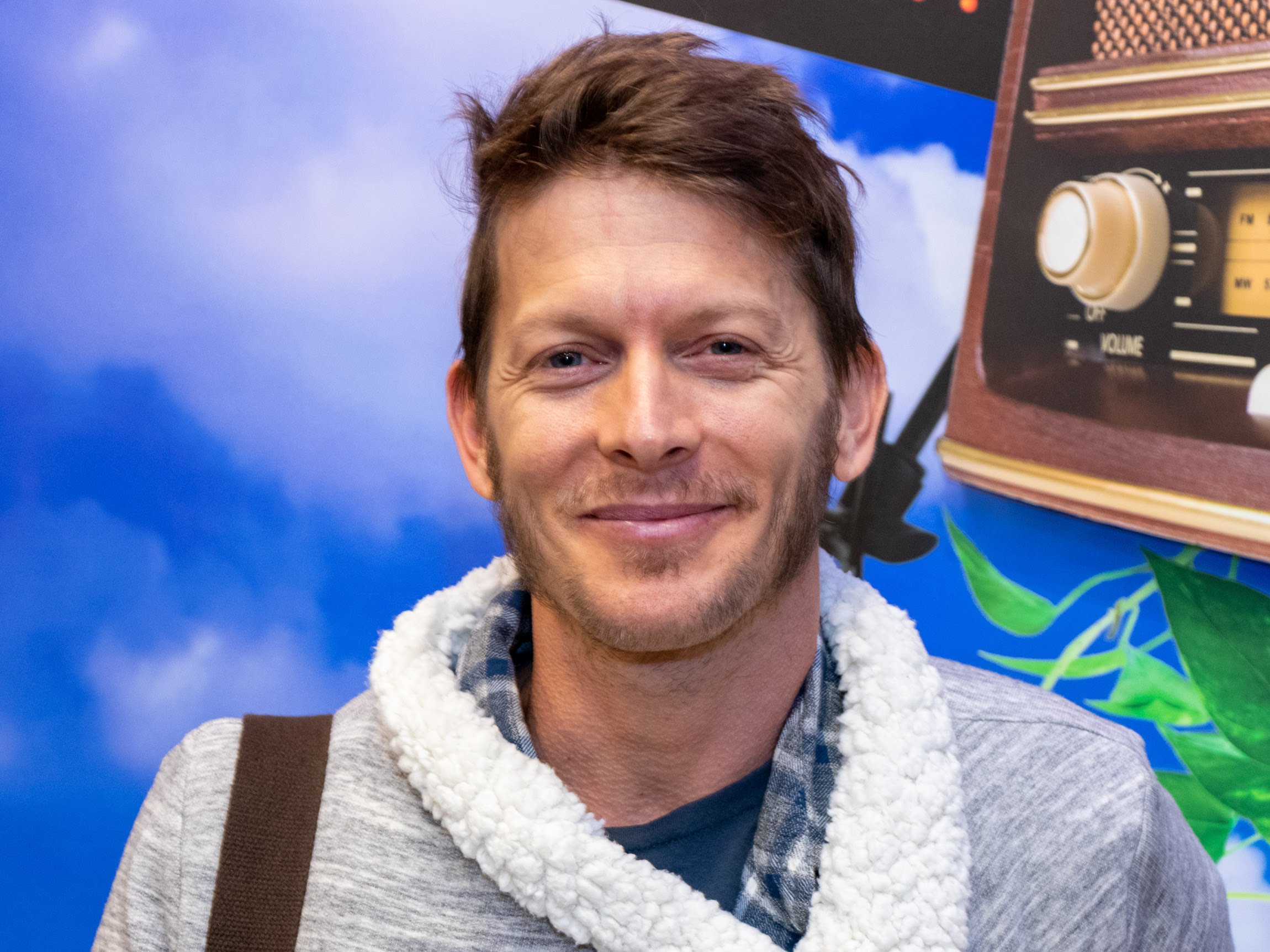
- Shechter in 2019
- Born: Ofer Shechter; April 8, 1981 (age 45); Hadar Am, Israel
- Occupations: Actor, stand-up comedian, television host, model

Ofer Shechter (Hebrew: עפר שכטר; April 8, 1981) is an Israeli actor, stand-up comedian, television host, and former model.

== Early life ==
Shechter was born and raised in moshav Hadar Am, Israel, to a family of Ashkenazi Jewish descent. At the age of seven, Shechter took part in a commercial for a watermelon ice pop which was broadcast on Israeli television. After his military service in the Israel Defense Forces, Shechter attended the Yoram Loewenstein Performing Arts Studio and studied acting in front of a camera.

== Career ==
By 2003 Shechter was selected, together with a group of young Israeli hosts that included Mali Levi, Michael Hanegbi, and Yael Goldman, to host the Israeli youth TV show Exit on the newly established Israeli Channel 10. In "Exit" Shechter received a wide media exposure, not necessarily because of his hosting talent but because of the many provocations Shechter caused during the show, which most notably was the one he did during a live show in which he revealed his buttocks before the young audience. Due to his many provocations, eventually the show was transferred to be broadcast on cable.

By 2003 Shechter played in the Hot 3 telenovela Mishak Hahayim (Game of Life) and appeared in the Israeli children's song contest The Festigal, in 2004 he starred in the Israeli musical Peter Pan and hosted the music festival in Samakh. In 2005 Shechter played the lead role in the telenovela Telenovela Ba'am (Soap opera, Inc.) alongside Yael Bar-Zohar and in 2006 he played in the telenovela Ha-Alufa (The champion) alongside Yehuda Levi. In addition, meanwhile Shechter also participated in several campaigns and advertisements for Cellcom and Bamba. Shechter was also featured as the leading model in the swimsuit campaign for the Israeli swimsuit manufacturer Pilpel in 2006. In addition, Shechter also participant in the regular cast the satirical show Mo'adon Layla (nightclub). Shechter participated also in dubbing several Animated series and movies to Hebrew — amongst them Avatar: The Last Airbender (as Zuko in season 1, after which he was replaced by Liron Lev) and the film Cars (as Lightning McQueen).

In 2006 Shechter took part in the Israeli film NO exit which won the Wolgin award in the Jerusalem Film Festival. In 2007 Shechter participated in the second season of the telenovela "Ha-Alufa". In 2008 Shechter participated in the weekly drama series "To love Anna" Channel 10 alongside Moshe Ivgy, the movie "Lost Islands" directed by Reshef Levy, the series "Lost & Found," and the Israeli drama series Until the wedding (עד החתונה). Shechter also participates in the satirical show Shavua Sof. In 2009 Shechter continued to play a series Ha-Alufa . In November 2009 he played in the Israeli drama series Noah's Ark. In February 2009 Shechter played the lead role in the Israeli drama film Phobidilia.

In 2023, Shechter competed in the 9th season of Israel's Rokdim Im Kokhavim ('Dancing with the Stars'), where he was eliminated 11th (out of 18 couples).

== Selected filmography ==
- Exit (2003)
- NO exit (2006)
- Mo'adon Layla (2006)
- Ha-Alufa (2006–2009)
- Lost Islands (2008)
- Phobidilia (2009)
- Rabies (2010)
- Cupcakes (2013)
- Metim Le Rega (2014–)
- Bloody Murray (2022)
