= Olesh =

Moshav in central Israel

Olesh: עולש (Hebrew)
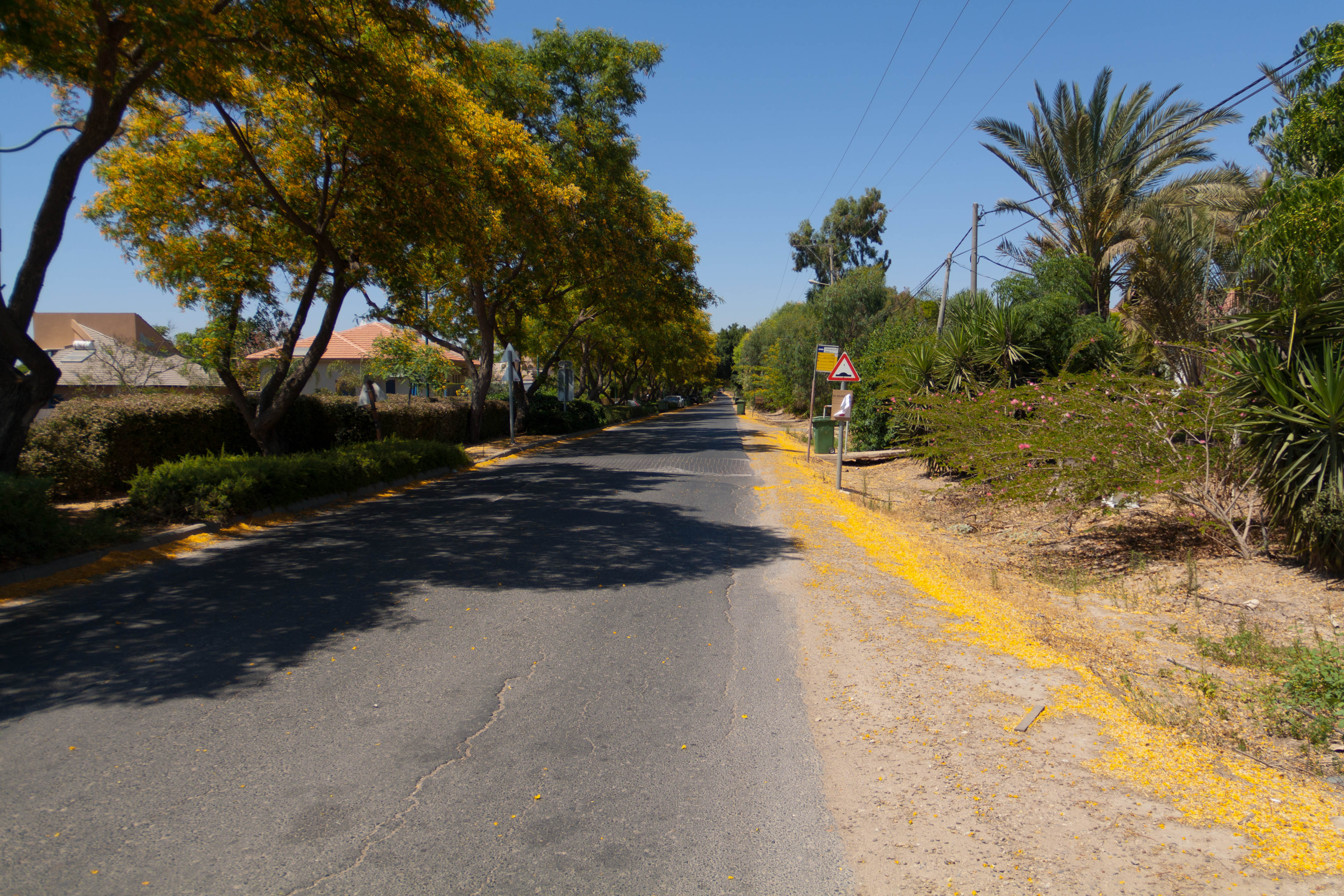

- Location within Central Israel
- Coordinates: 32°19′57″N 34°59′7″E
- Country: Israel
- District: Central
- Subdistrict: HaSharon
- Council: Hefer Valley
- Affiliation: Moshavim Movement
- Founded: 1951
- Founder: Romanian immigrants
- Population (2024): 1,382

Olesh (Hebrew: עולש, lit. 'Chicory') is a moshav in central Israel. Located in the Sharon plain, it falls under the jurisdiction of Hefer Valley Regional Council. In 2024 it had a population of 1,382.

== History ==
The moshav was founded in 1951 by immigrants from Romania on land south of the former Palestinian village of Qaqun, which had been depopulated in the 1948 Arab–Israeli War. It was initially named Be'erotayim Bet, but was later renamed Olesh due to the large chicory plants in the area.

In 1953 it absorbed more immigrants from North Africa and in 1965 it took in new residents from Beit She'an. In the late 1990s it doubled in size as part of an expansion plan.
