= Be'erotayim =

Moshav in central Israel

Be'erotayim: בארותיים (Hebrew)
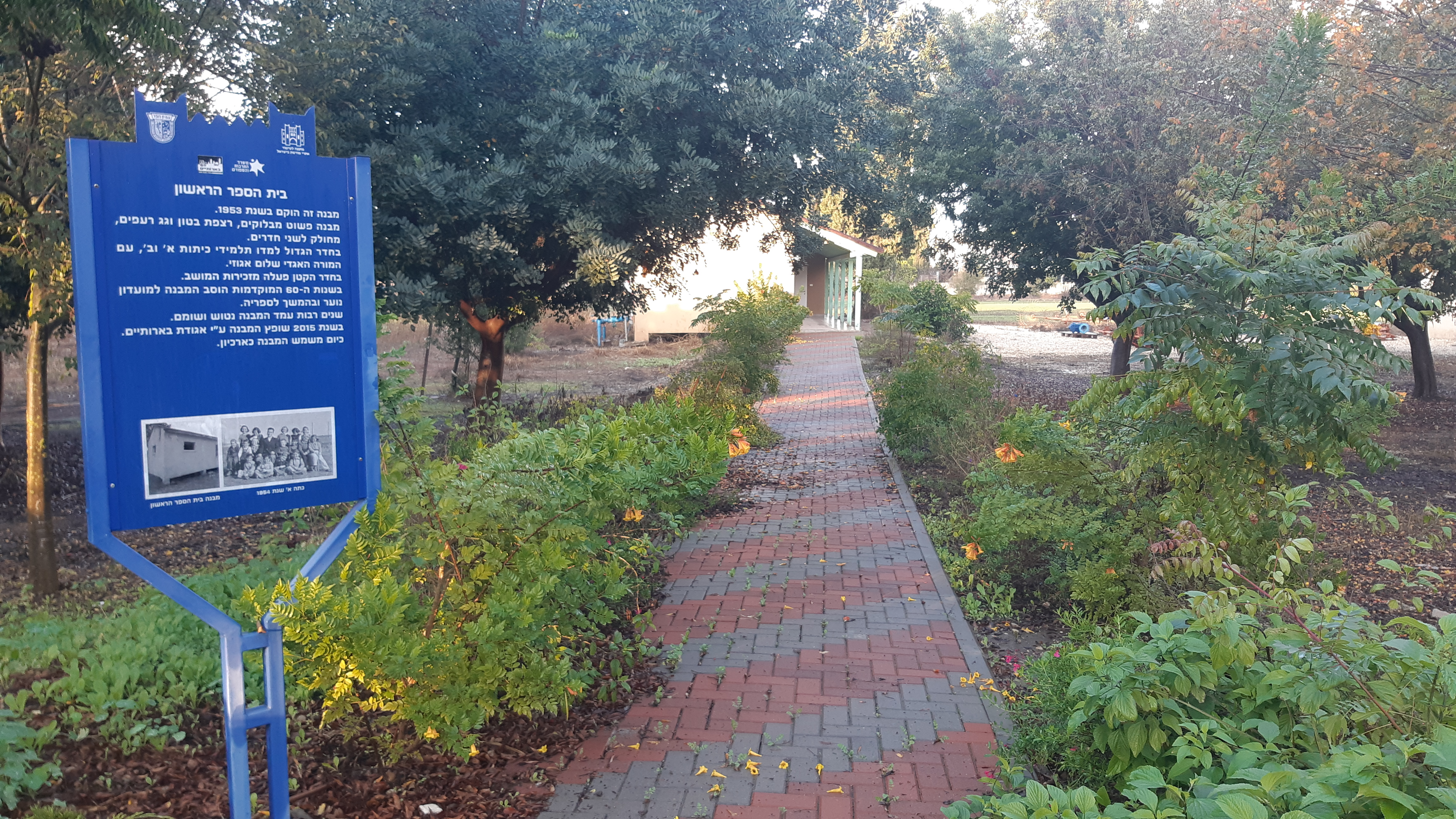

- Location within Central Israel Location within Israel
- Coordinates: 32°19′17″N 34°59′3″E
- Country: Israel
- District: Central
- Subdistrict: HaSharon
- Council: Hefer Valley
- Affiliation: Moshavim Movement
- Founded: 1949
- Founder: Czechoslovak and Hungarian Jews
- Population (2024): 1,179

Be'erotayim (Hebrew: בארותיים) is a moshav in central Israel. Located in the Sharon plain and covering 3,500 dunams, it falls under the jurisdiction of Hefer Valley Regional Council. In 2024 it had a population of 1,179.

== Etymology ==
The name (meaning "Two Wells") is derived from the pre-1948 Arabic name "Bir Burin".

== History ==
The moshav was founded in 1949 by Jewish immigrants from Czechoslovakia and Hungary. In 1956, it absorbed more Jewish immigrants from North Africa. Every family was allotted 25 dunam of land: 10 dunam for growing vegetables and 15 dunam for orchards. A water shortage caused hardships in the moshav in its first years of operation.

Nearby Olesh was initially named Be'erotayim Bet, but was later renamed.
