= Hadar Am =

Moshav in central Israel

Hadar Am: הֲדַר עָם (Hebrew)
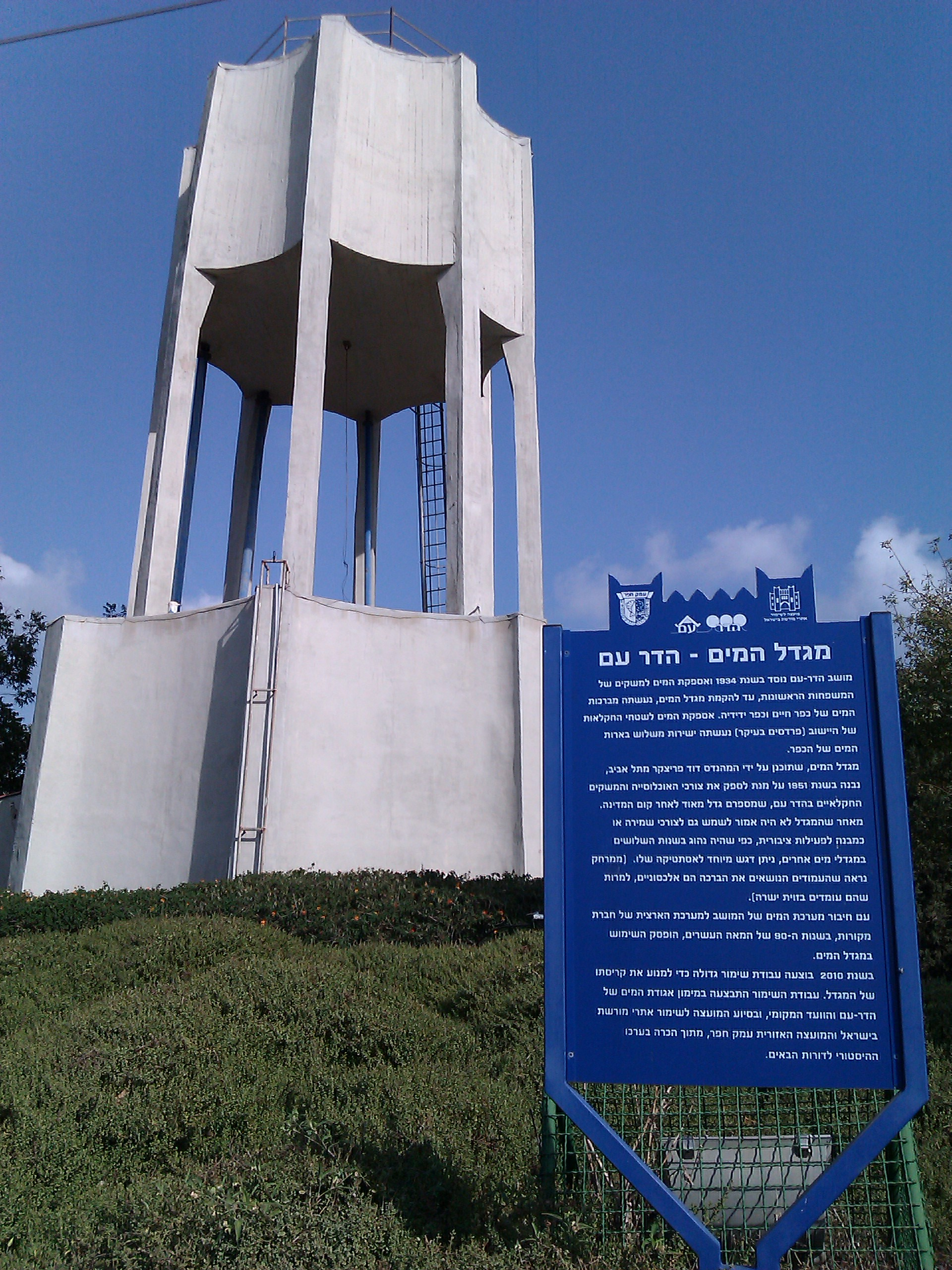
- The village's water tower

- Location within Central Israel Location within Israel
- Coordinates: 32°20′59″N 34°53′54″E
- Country: Israel
- District: Central
- Subdistrict: HaSharon
- Council: Hefer Valley
- Affiliation: Agricultural Union
- Founded: 1934
- Founder: American and Lithuanian Jewish immigrants
- Population (2024): 854
- Website: hadaram.co.il

Hadar Am (Hebrew: הֲדַר עָם, lit. 'Nation Citrus') is a moshav in central Israel. Located in the Sharon plain near Netanya, it falls under the jurisdiction of Hefer Valley Regional Council. In 2024 it had a population of 854.

== History ==
The moshav was founded on land that had been purchased in 1929. Orchards started to be planted in April 1934 and the first houses were built the following year. The first residents were Jewish immigrants from Lithuania and North America, and was initially named Herut America Gimel (there were two other settlements named Herut America - Herut America Alef (now Herut) and Herut America Bet (now Beit Herut)) after the organisation which helped them immigrate. In 1943 it was renamed Hadar Am after citrus trees which surrounded the village.

By 1948 there were only seven families living in the village. In the 1950s the village expanded with immigrants from the Netherlands and Holocaust survivors moving to the village.

== Notable people ==
- Ofer Shechter
