= Beit Hazon =

Neighbourhood of Kfar Haroeh in Israel

Beit Hazon: בית חזון (Hebrew)
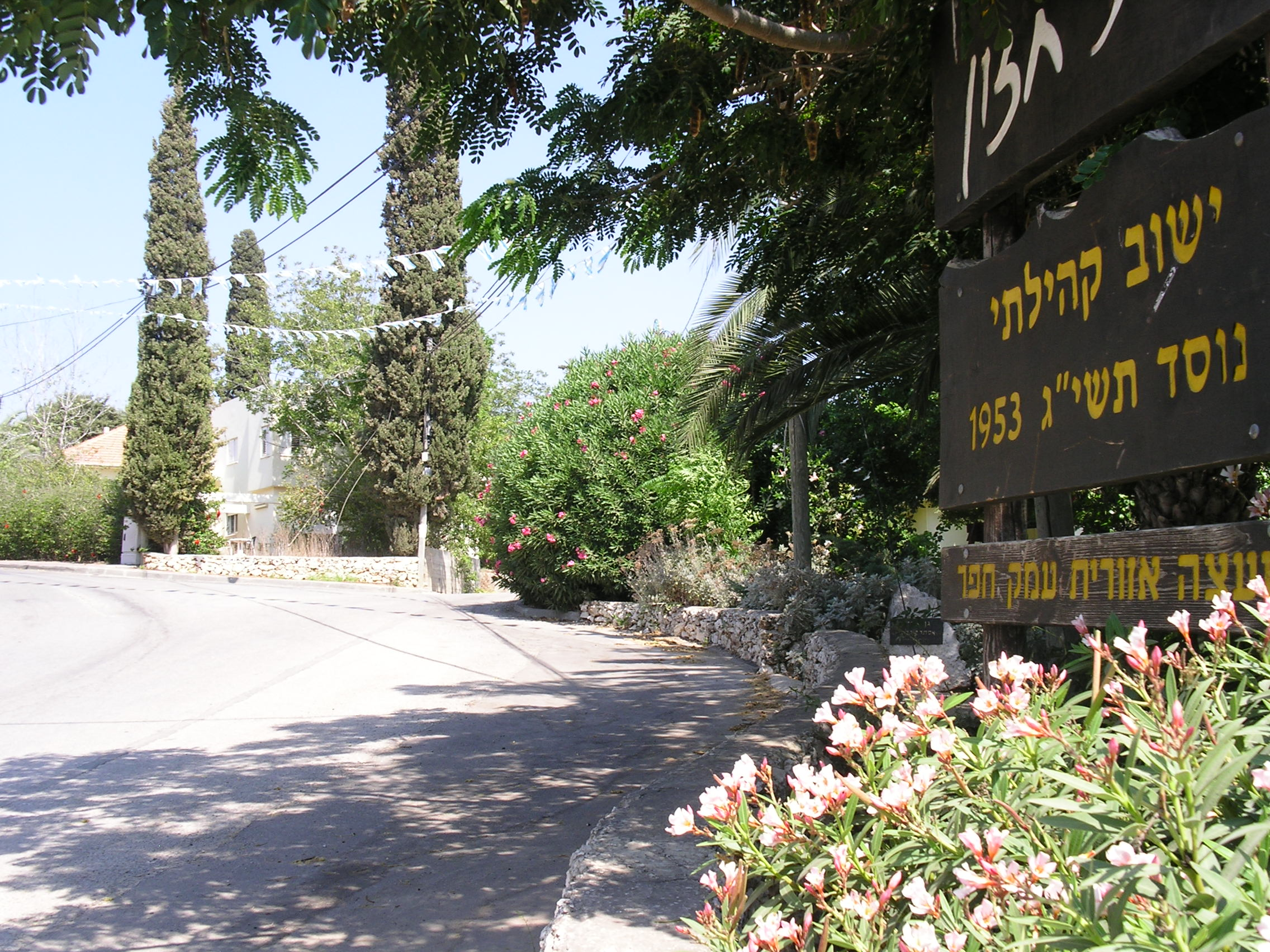
- Etymology: Hazon House
- Location within Central Israel Location within Israel
- Coordinates: 32°23′13″N 34°54′42″E
- Country: Israel
- District: Central
- Council: Hefer Valley
- Region: Coastal plain
- Founded: 1953
- Founder: American, English and South African immigrants

Beit Hazon (Hebrew: בית חזון, lit. 'Hazon House') is a predominantly English-speaking neighbourhood of Kfar Haroeh in central Israel.

== History ==
The neighbourhood was formed by a group of immigrants from England, South Africa and the United States. It was named after Avrohom Yeshaya Karelitz, who was also known as Hazon Ish. In 2008, Beit Hazon residents submitted a request to be registered as an independent community settlement. However, it was not recognized as a separate entity by the local authority, the Hefer Valley Regional Council.

== Notable residents ==
- David Bannett
