= Bahan, Israel =

Kibbutz in central Israel

Bahan: בַּחַן (Hebrew)
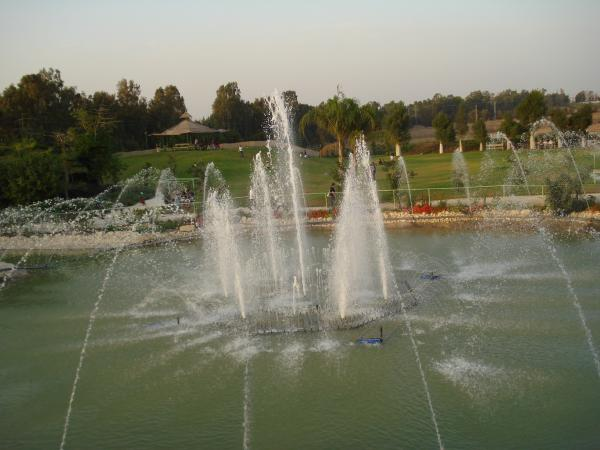
- Park Utopia in Bahan

- Location within Central Israel Location within Israel
- Coordinates: 32°21′3″N 35°1′9″E
- Country: Israel
- District: Central
- Subdistrict: HaSharon
- Council: Hefer Valley
- Affiliation: Kibbutz Movement
- Founded: 1954
- Founder: South American immigrants
- Population (2024): 1,062
- Website: www.bahan.org.il

Bahan (Hebrew: בַּחַן, lit. 'Watchtower') is a kibbutz in central Israel. Located near Bat Hefer, it falls under the jurisdiction of Hefer Valley Regional Council. In 2024 it had a population of 1,062.

== History ==
The kibbutz was established in 1954 by a Nahal gar'in group made up of immigrants from South America. Its name is a biblical word from Isaiah (32:14), also commemorating a watchtower located near the Jordanian border until 1967. Nearby is an archaeological site named Tel Bahan and ruins of the depopulated Palestinian village of Qaqun.

== Utopia Park ==
The kibbutz is the location of Utopia Park, an orchid and tropical flower garden and park.

== Notable residents ==
- Eitan Bronstein immigrated to kibbutz Bahan from Argentina as a child
