= Hogla, Bangladesh =

- Location in Bangladesh
- Coordinates: 22°39′N 90°3′E
- Country: Bangladesh
- Division: Barisal Division
- District: Pirojpur District
- Time zone: UTC+6 (Bangladesh Time)

Hogla, Bangladesh is a village in Pirojpur District in the Barisal Division of southwestern Bangladesh.
