= Hogla, Israel =

Moshav in central Israel

Hogla: חגלה (Hebrew)
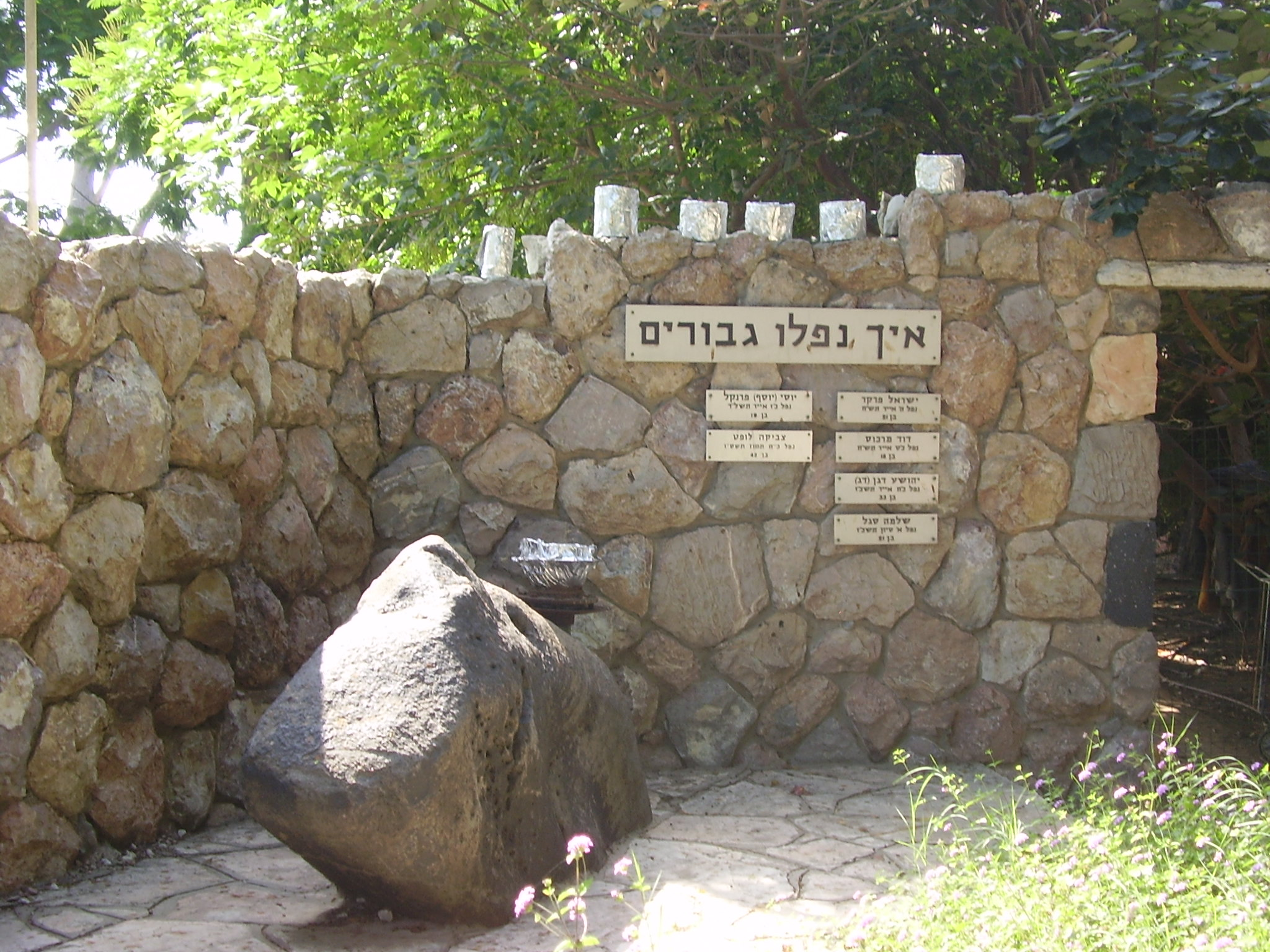

- Location within Central Israel Location within Israel
- Coordinates: 32°23′11″N 34°55′36″E
- Country: Israel
- District: Central
- Subdistrict: HaSharon
- Council: Hefer Valley
- Affiliation: Moshavim Movement
- Founded: 1933
- Founder: Bulgarian, Polish and Russian Jewish immigrants
- Population (2024): 771

Hogla (Hebrew: חגלה, lit. 'Partridge') is a moshav in central Israel. Located in the coastal plain to the south of Hadera, it falls under the jurisdiction of Hefer Valley Regional Council. In 2024 it had a population of 771.

== Etymology ==
It is named after Hogla, who settled here in the district of the tribe of Menashe (Joshua 17:3).

== History ==
In July 1932 twelve members of Hashomer Hatzair arrived at the settlement site allocated to them in the Hefer Valley and established the first hut. They fenced off the 1,000-dunam area—20 dunams per 50 families—that had been designated for them, dug a well, constructed a "water facility" on it, and plowed the sowing fields. In 1936, the settlers accepted the proposal of the Government Naming Committee to name their community Hogla. The moshav was founded by Jewish immigrants from Bulgarian, Poland and Russian. By 1939, the settlement had a population of 139 residents across 39 farms.

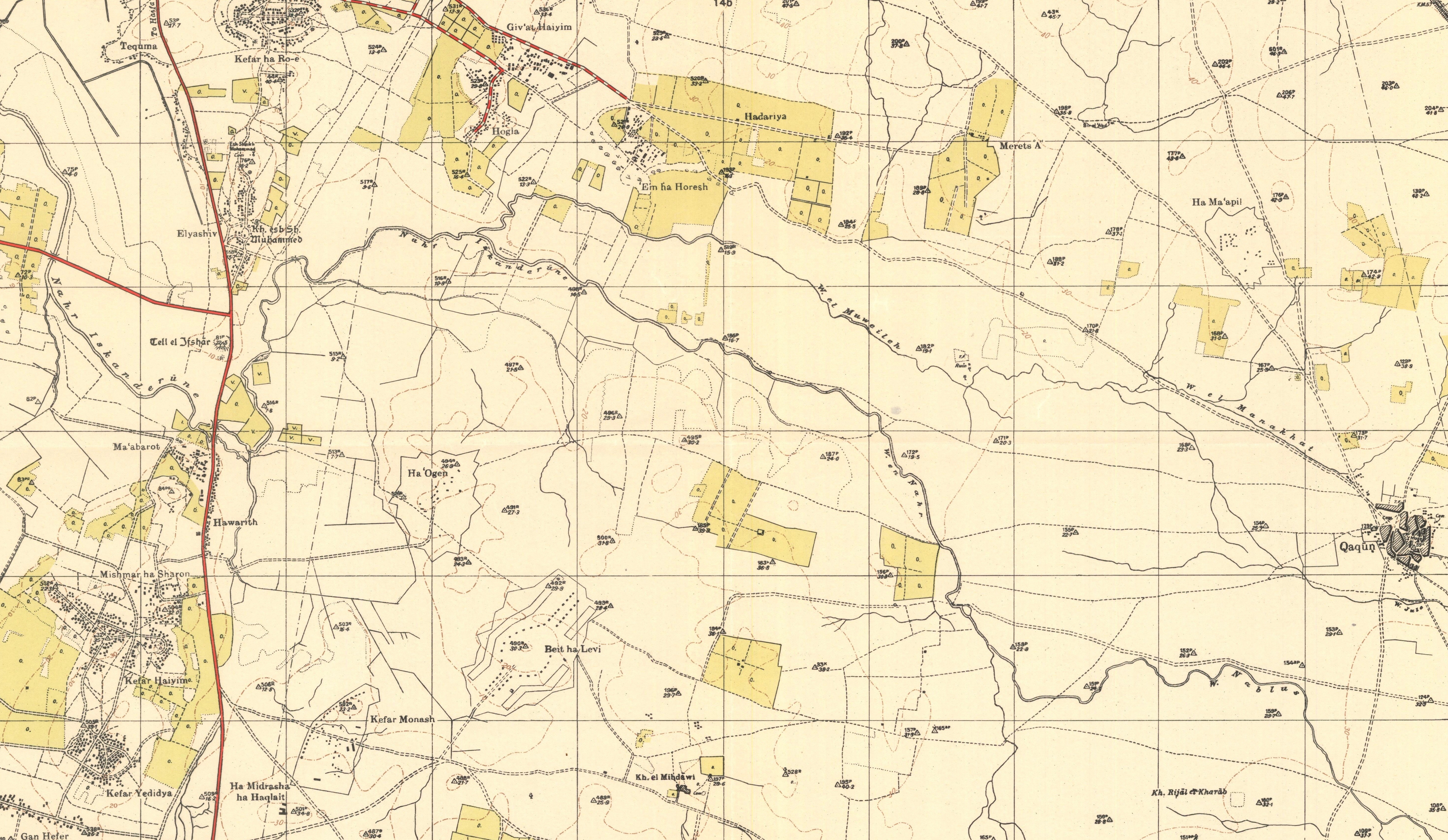
Hogla 1939 1:20,000

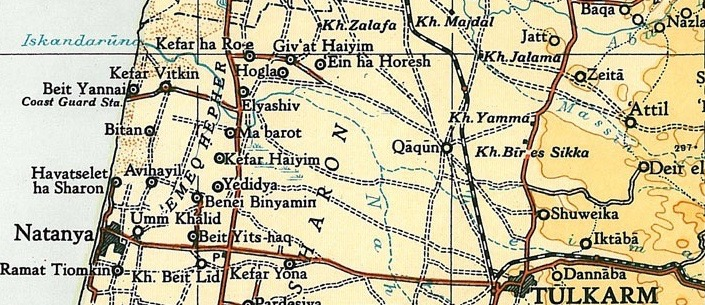
Hogla (Kefar Haiyim) 1945 1:250,000
