= Kfar Haroeh =

Moshav in central Israel

Kfar Haroeh: כְּפַר הָרֹאֶ״ה (Hebrew)
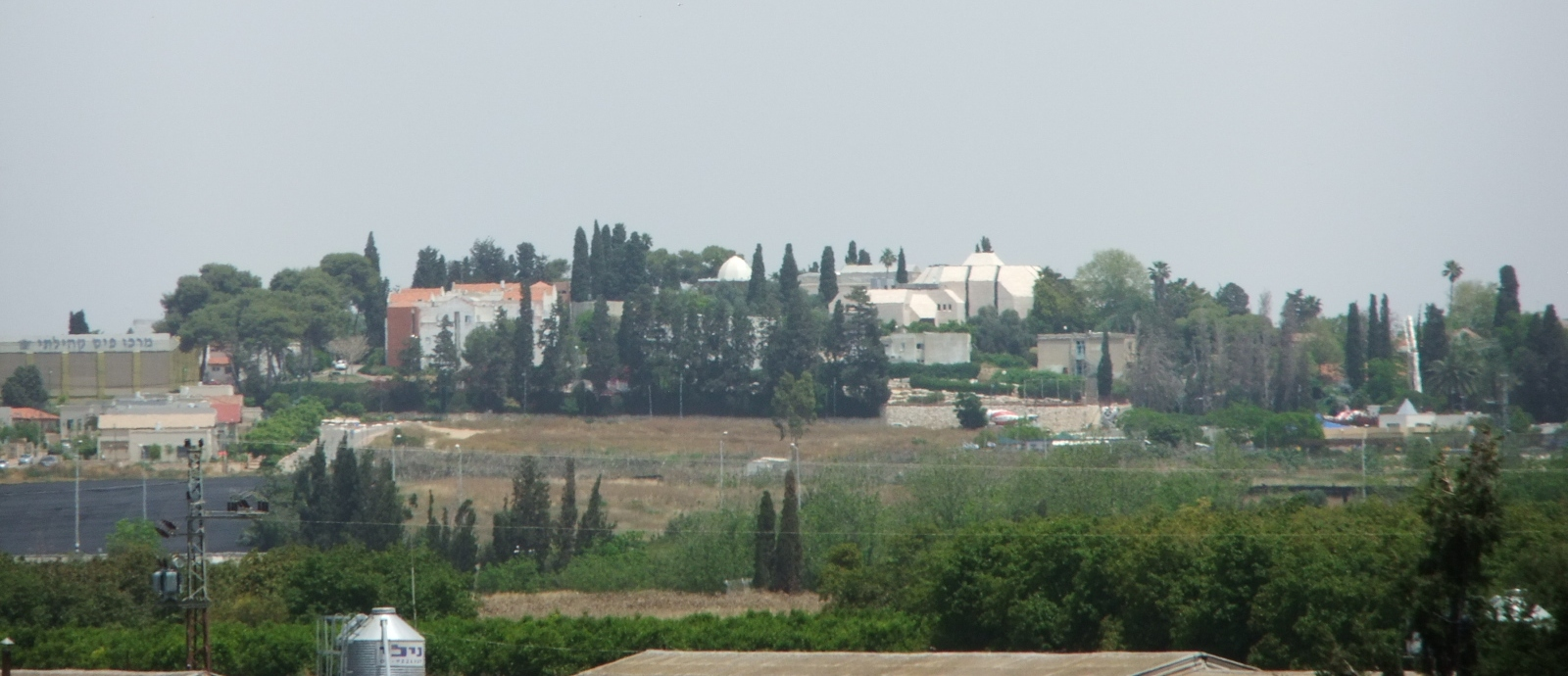

- Location within Central Israel
- Coordinates: 32°23′27″N 34°54′44″E
- Country: Israel
- District: Central
- Subdistrict: HaSharon
- Council: Hefer Valley
- Affiliation: Hapoel HaMizrachi
- Founded: 23 November 1933
- Founder: European immigrants
- Population (2024): 1,349

Kfar Haroeh (Hebrew: כְּפַר הָרֹאֶ״ה, lit. 'Haroeh Village') is a religious moshav in central Israel. Located in the coastal plain between Hadera and Netanya, it falls under the jurisdiction of Hefer Valley Regional Council. In 2024 it had a population of 1,349.

== History ==
In 1929 the Jewish National Fund bought 30,800 dunums of land from absentee landlords of the Arab village of Wadi al-Hawarith at an auction. After purchasing the land the JNF began the process of evicting the tenants of the land, a process that was complete by 1933. Kfar Haroeh was established on 23 November that year and named for Abraham Isaac Kook, the first Ashkenazi chief rabbi of Mandatory Palestine. "Haroeh" is an acronym for HaRav Avraham HaCohen Kook. The founders were religious Jews who immigrated from Europe.

A yeshiva in the moshav was founded by Rabbi Moshe-Zvi Neria. This was the forerunner of the numerous Mamlachti dati Torah high schools associated with Bnei Akiva.

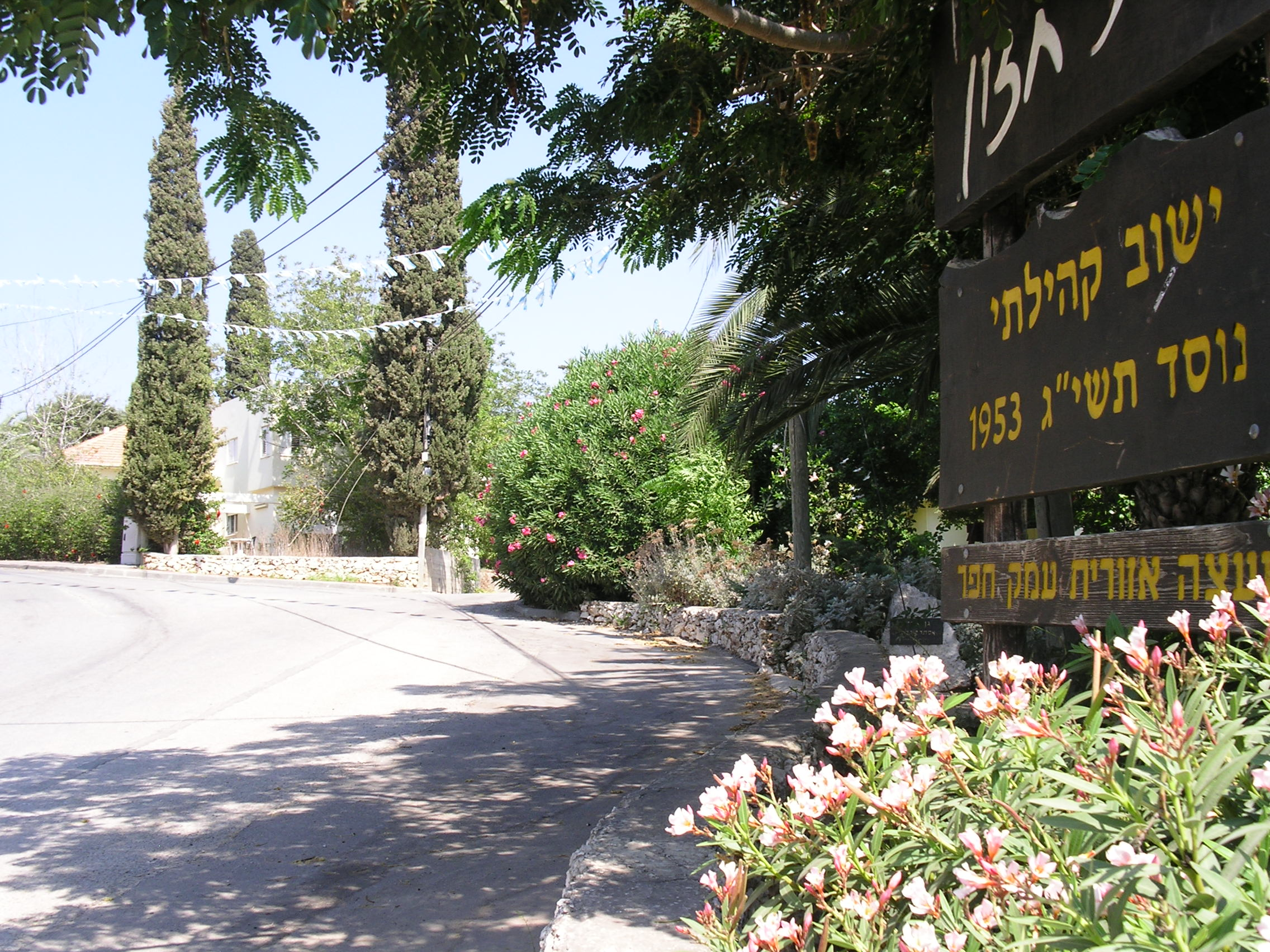
Entrance to Beit Hazon

Beit Hazon, initially a neighborhood of Kfar Haroeh, is now regarded as a separate community settlement.

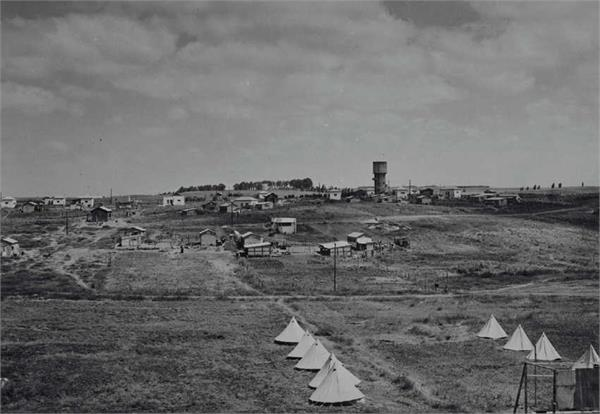
Kfar Haroeh 1939

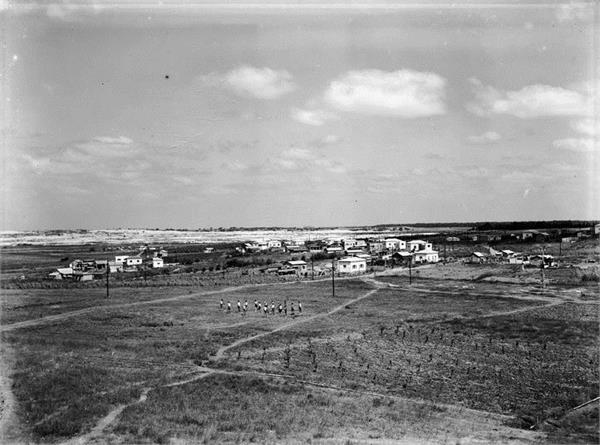
Kfar Haroeh 1939

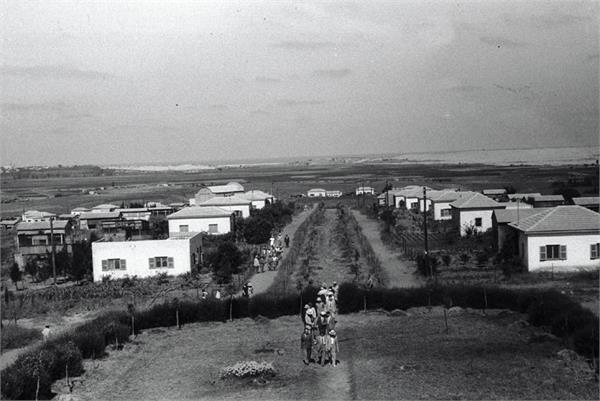
Kfar Haroeh 1943

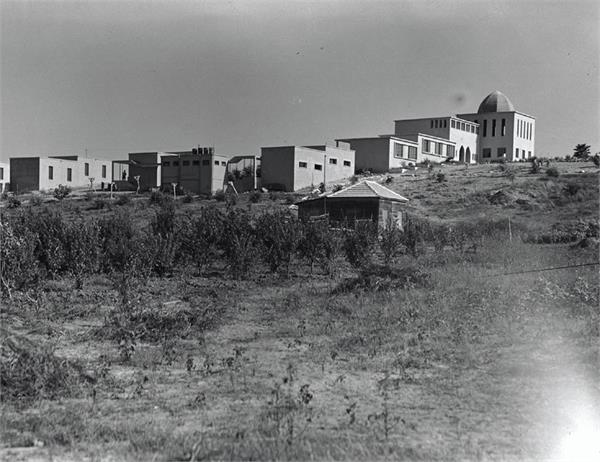
Kfar Haroeh 1945

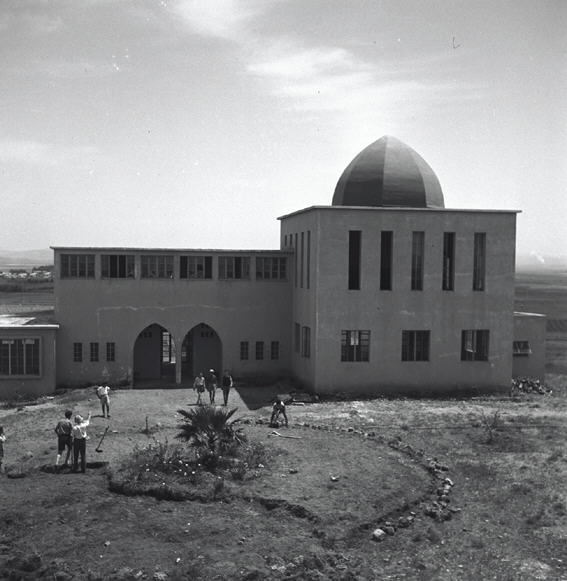
Kfar Haroeh 1945
