= Herev Le'et =

Moshav in central Israel

Herev Le'et: חֶרֶב לְאֵת (Hebrew); حيرف لئيت (Arabic)
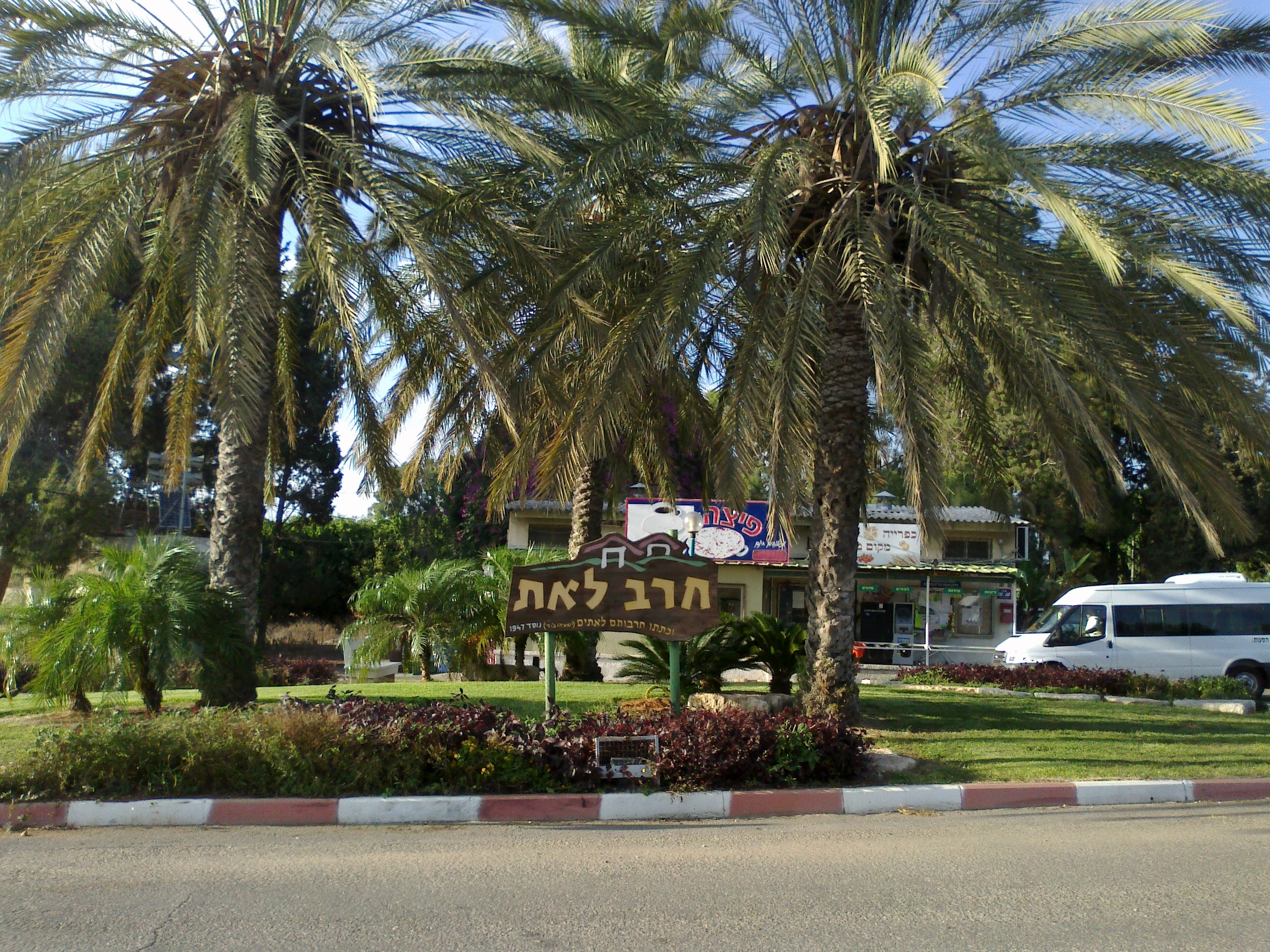
- Herev Le'et

- Location within Central Israel
- Coordinates: 32°24′5″N 34°55′0″E
- Country: Israel
- District: Central
- Subdistrict: HaSharon
- Council: Hefer Valley
- Affiliation: Agricultural Union
- Founded: 1947
- Founder: Demobbed soldiers
- Population (2024): 844

Herev Le'et (Hebrew: חֶרֶב לְאֵת, lit. Sword to Plowshare) is a moshav in central Israel. Located in the coastal plain to the south of Hadera and covering 1,750 dunams, it falls under the jurisdiction of Hefer Valley Regional Council. In 2024 it had a population of 844.

== History ==
The moshav was founded in 1947 by demobilised soldiers from the British and Czechoslovak Army. Its name is taken from the Book of Isaiah, 2:4;

And He shall judge between the nations, and shall decide for many peoples; and they shall beat their swords into plowshares, and their spears into pruninghooks; nation shall not lift up sword against nation, neither shall they learn war any more.
