= Bitan Aharon =

Moshav in central Israel

Bitan Aharon: בִּיתַן אַהֲרֹן (Hebrew)
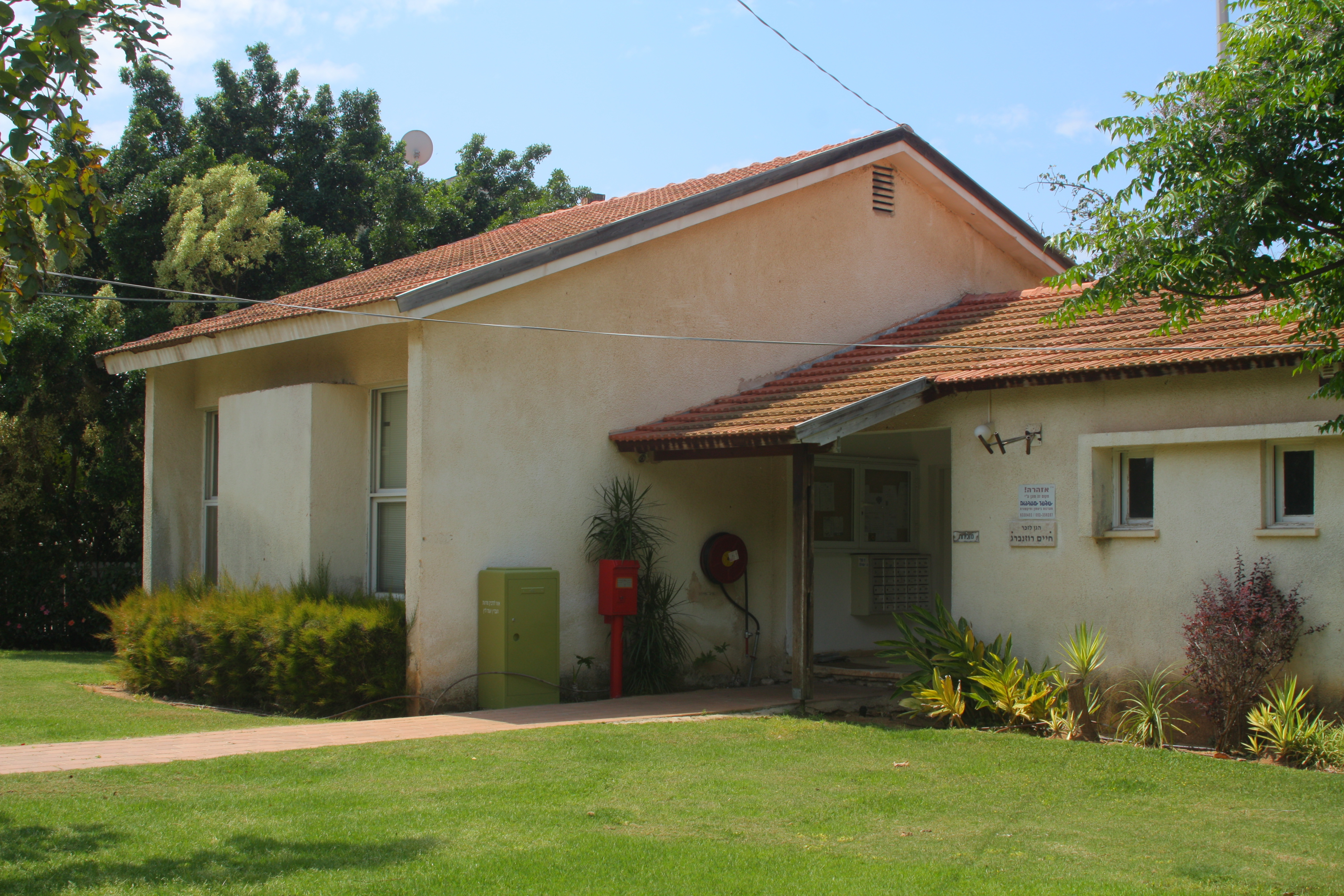
- Bitan Aharon secretariat building

- Location within Central Israel Location within Israel
- Coordinates: 32°21′56″N 34°52′11″E
- Country: Israel
- District: Central
- Subdistrict: HaSharon
- Council: Hefer Valley
- Affiliation: Agricultural Union
- Founded: 1936
- Population (2024): 217

Bitan Aharon (Hebrew: בִּיתַן אַהֲרֹן, lit. 'Aharon's Pavilion') is a moshav in central Israel. Located in the Sharon plain between Hadera and Netanya, it falls under the jurisdiction of Hefer Valley Regional Council. In 2024 it had a population of 217.

== History ==
The moshav was founded in 1936. During its first years the members of the moshav hired workers to plant orange groves while its members lived in the cities. A decade later the village became more developed with new settlers joining. In 1947 it had a population of 100. The village was named after Aharon (Archibald Jacob, "Archie") Freiman, a leader of the World Zionist Organization in Canada and an advisor to Yehoshua Hankin. The two were instrumental in raising the funds to purchase Emek Hefer (the Hefer valley) in the 1920s and to make it available for Jewish settlement.

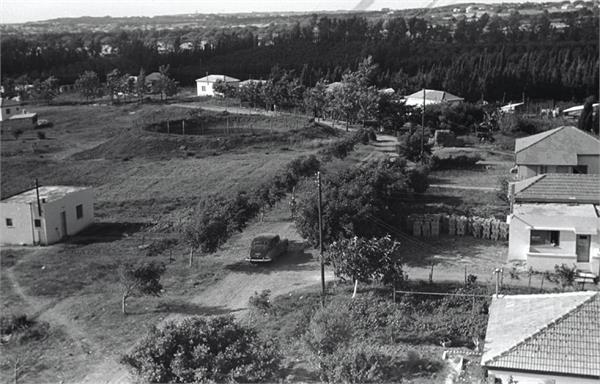
Bitan Aharon 1947

== Bitan Aharon nature reserve ==
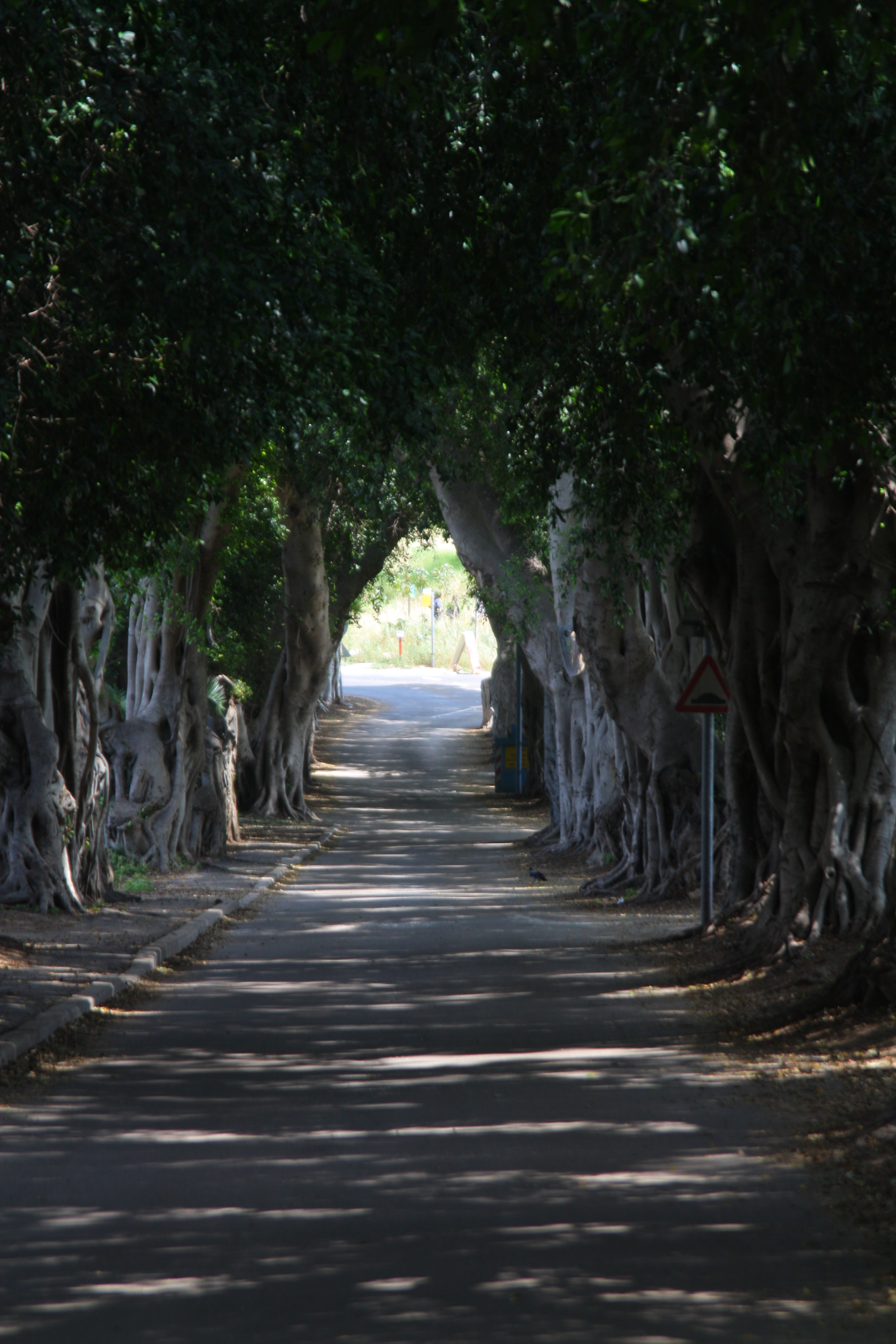
Avenue of ficus trees

A 46-dunam nature reserve was declared in 1968, just east of the moshav. The reserve covers part of the second (middle) Kurkar ridge that runs on a north–south axis in this part of the Israeli coastal plain, and therefore includes a number of ancient rock-hewn tombs and burial caves. Flora includes Ziziphus spina-christi and Pancratium parviflorum.

== Notable residents ==
- Hen Lippin (born 1965), basketball player
- Vadim Rabinovich (born 1953), former member of parliament in Ukraine
