= Tulkarm Subdistrict, Mandatory Palestine =

Administrative division of British Palestine (1920–1948)

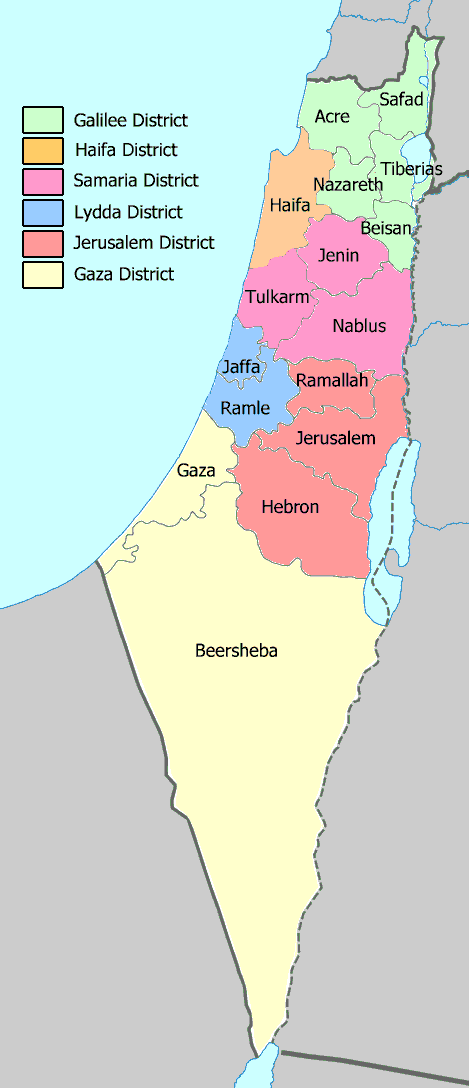
Subdistricts grouped by districts in 1945. Samaria District with Tulkarm Subdistrict in purple.

The Tulkarm Subdistrict was one of the subdistricts of Mandatory Palestine. It was located around the city of Tulkarm. After the 1948 Arab-Israeli War, the subdistrict disintegrated, the western part became part of the Central District of Israel and the eastern part, became a part of the Jordanian annexation of the West Bank from 1948 to 1967). Most of the eastern part is today the Tulkarm Governorate, part of the State of Palestine.

== Towns and villages ==
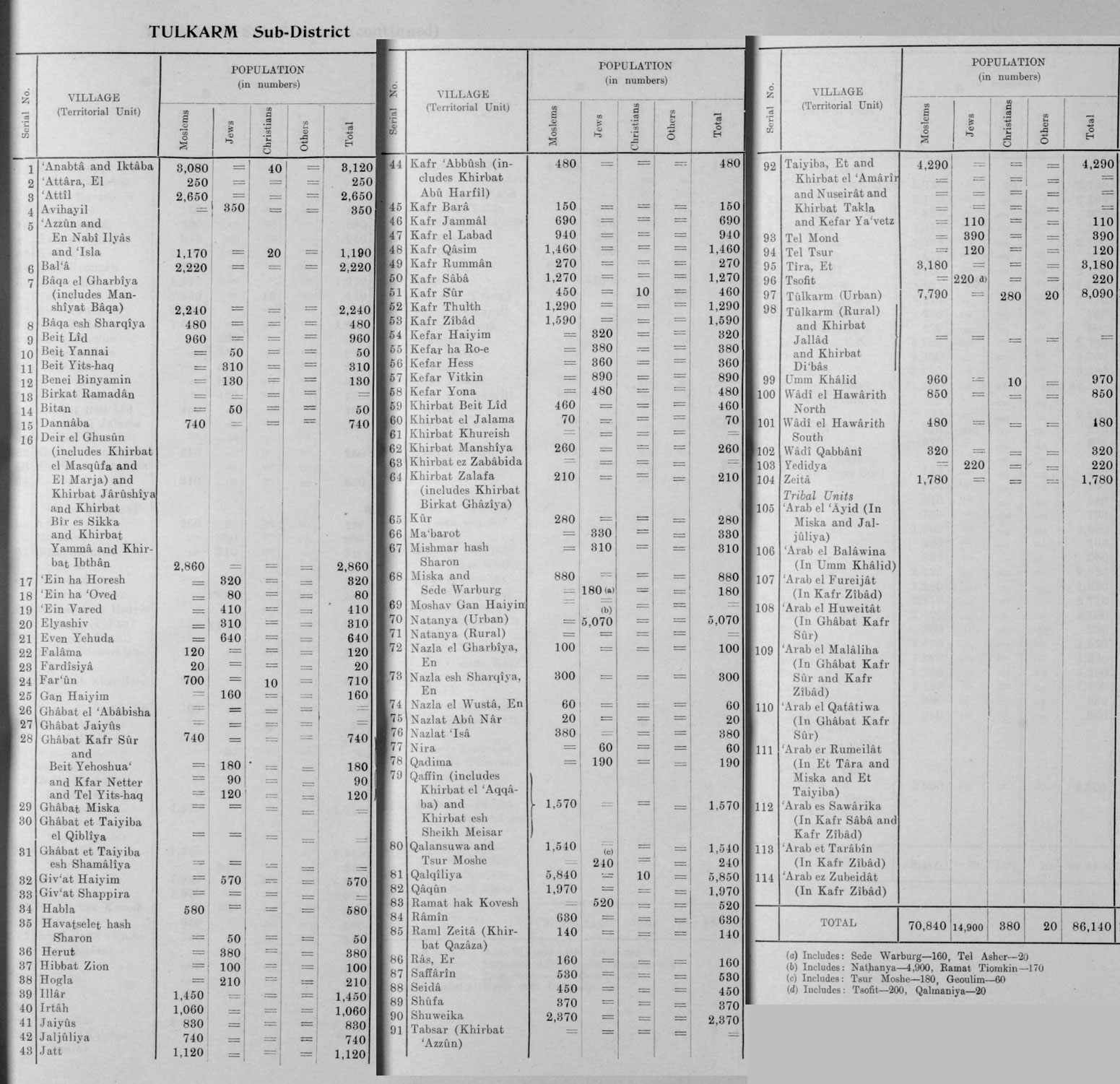
Official population statistics for the sub-district, from Village Statistics, 1945.

Tulkarm Sub-District – Population by Village
Village	Muslims	Jews	Christians	Others	Total
‘Anabta and Iktaba	3,080		40		3,120
‘Attara (El)	250				250
‘Attil	2,650				2,650
Avihayil		350			350
‘Azzun and En Nabi Ilyas and ‘Isla	1,170		20		1,190
Bal‘a	2,220				2,220
Baqa el Gharbiya (includes Manshiyat Baqa)	2,240				2,240
Baqa esh Sharqiya	480				480
Beit Lid	960				960
Beit Yannai		50			50
Beit Yitshaq		310			310
Benei Binyamin		130			130
Birkat Ramadan					
Bitan		50			50
Dannaba	740				740
Deir el Ghusun (includes Khirbat el Masqifa, El Marja, Khirbat Jarishiya, Khirbat Bir es Sikka, Khirbat Yamma and Khirbat Ibthan)	2,860				2,860
‘Ein ha Horesh		320			320
‘Ein ha ‘Oved		80			80
‘Ein Vared		410			410
Elyashiv		310			310
Even Yehuda		640			640
Falama	120				120
Fardisiya	20				20
Far‘un	700		10		710
Gan Hayim		160			160
Ghabat el ‘Ababisha					
Ghabat Jayyus					
Ghabat Kafr Sur	740				740
Beit Yehoshua‘		180			180
Kafr Netter		90			90
Tel Yitshaq		120			120
Ghabat Miska					
Ghabat et Taiyiba el Qibliya					
Ghabat et Taiyiba esh Shamaliya					
Giv‘at Hayim		570			570
Giv‘at Shappira					
Habla	580				580
Havatselet hash Sharon		50			50
Herut		380			380
Hibbat Zion		100			100
Hogla		210			210
Ilar	1,450				1,450
Irtah	1,060				1,060
Jaiyus	830				830
Jajuliya	740				740
Jatt	1,120				1,120
Kafr ‘Abbush (includes Khirbat Abu Harfil)	480				480
Kafr Bara	150				150
Kafr Jammal	690				690
Kafr el Labad	940				940
Kafr Qasim	1,460				1,460
Kafr Rumman	270				270
Kafr Saba	1,270				1,270
Kafr Sur	450		10		460
Kafr Thulth	1,290				1,290
Kafr Zibad	1,590				1,590
Kefar Hayim		320			320
Kefar ha Ro‘eh		380			380
Kefar Hess		360			360
Kefar Vitkin		890			890
Kefar Yona		480			480
Khirbat Beit Lid	460				460
Khirbat el Jalama	70				70
Khirbat Khureish					
Khirbat Manshiya	260				260
Khirbat ez Zabibda					
Khirbat Zalafa (includes Khirbat Birkat Ghaziya)	210				210
Kur	280				280
Ma‘abarot		330			330
Mishmar hash Sharon		310			310
Miska	880				880
Sede Warburg		180			180
Moshav Gan Hayim					
Natanya (Urban)		5,070			5,070
Natanya (Rural)					
Nazla el Gharbiya (En)	100				100
Nazla esh Sharqiya (En)	300				300
Nazla el Wusta (En)	60				60
Nazlat Abu Nar	20				20
Nazlat ‘Isa	380				380
Nira		60			60
Qadima		190			190
Qaffin (includes Khirbat el ‘Aqqaba and Khirbat esh Sheikh Meisar)	1,570				1,570
Qalansuwa	1,540				1,540
Tsur Moshe		240			240
Qalqilya	5,840		10		5,850
Qaqun	1,970				1,970
Ramat hak Kovesh		520			520
Ramin	630				630
Raml Zeita (Khirbat Qazaza)	140				140
Ras (Er)	160				160
Safarin	530				530
Seida	450				450
Shufa	370				370
Shuweika	2,370				2,370
Tabsar (Khirbat ‘Azzun)					
Taiyiba (Et) (includes Khirbat el ‘Amarin, Nuseirat, Khirbat Takla)	4,290				4,290
Kefar Ya‘etz		110			110
Tel Mond		390			390
Tel Tsur		120			120
Tira (Et)	3,180				3,180
Tsofit (d)		220			220
Tulkarm (Urban)	7,790		280	20	8,090
Tulkarm (Rural)					
Umm Khalid	960		10		970
Wadi el Hawarith (North)	850				850
Wadi el Hawarith (South)	480				480
Wadi Qabbani	320				320
Yedidiya		220			220
Zeita	1,780				1,780
Tribal Units					
TOTAL	70,840	14,900	380	20	86,140

=== Depopulated towns and villages ===
(current localities in parentheses)

- Khirbat Bayt Lid (Nordia)
- Bayyarat Hannun
- Fardisya (Sha'ar Efraim on nearby lands)
- Ghabat Kafr Sur (Beit Yehoshua, Kfar Neter, Tel Yitzhak)
- al-Jalama (Lahavot Chaviva)
- Kafr Saba (Beyt Berl, Hak'ramim, Neve Yamin)
- Khirbat al-Majdal (Sde Yitzhak)
- al-Manshiyya (Ahituv, Ein HaHoresh, Givat Haim)
- Miska (Mishmeret, Sde Warburg)
- Qaqun (Gan Yoshiya, Haniel, HaMa'apil, Olesh, Ometz, Yikon)
- Raml Zayta (Sde Yitzhak)
- Tabsur (Batzra, Ra'anana suburbs)
- Umm Khalid (Netanya suburbs)
- Wadi al-Hawarith (Geulei Teiman, Kfar Haroeh, Kfar Vitkin)
- Wadi Qabbani
- Khirbat al-Zababida
- Khirbat Zalafa (Givat Oz)
