= Khirbat al-Majdal =

Khirbat al-Majdal خربة المجدل
- Village
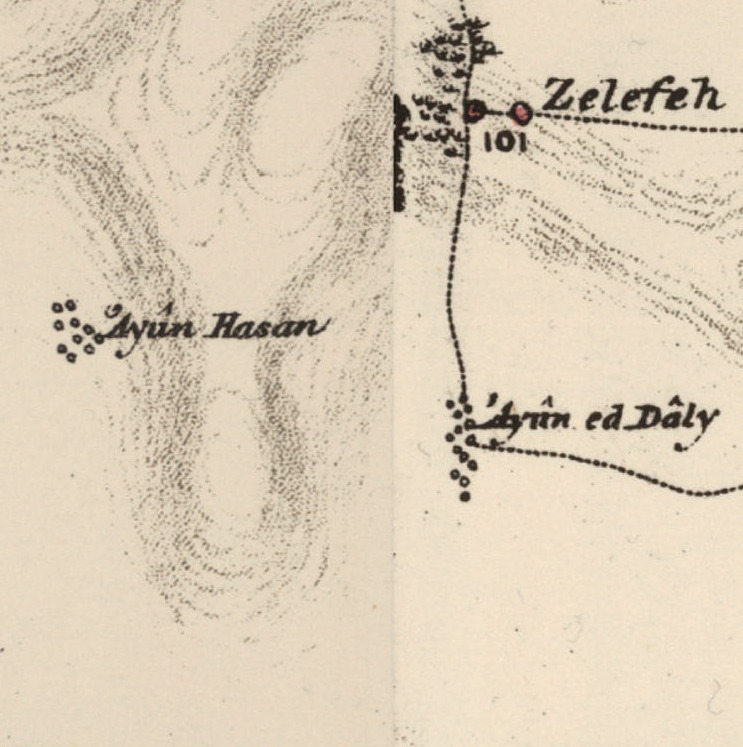
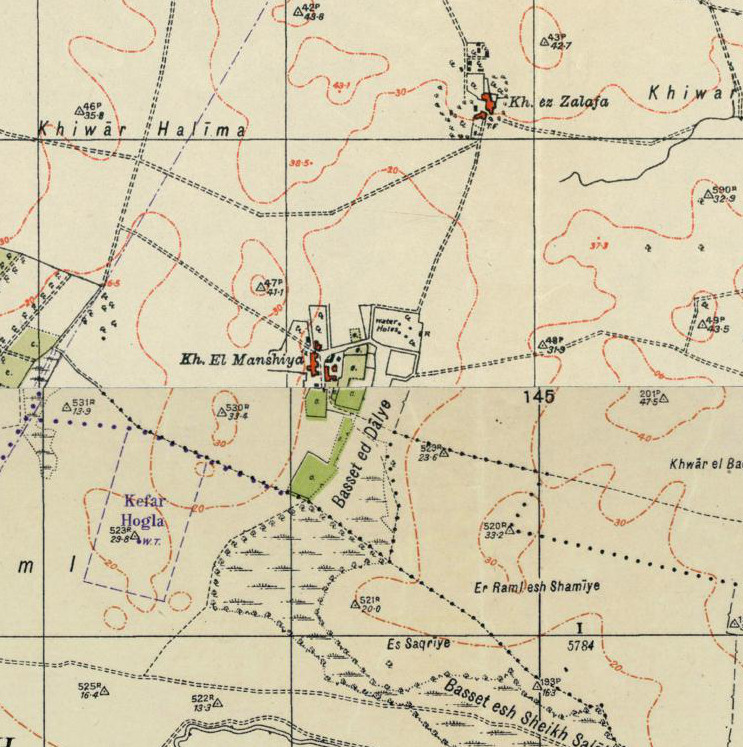
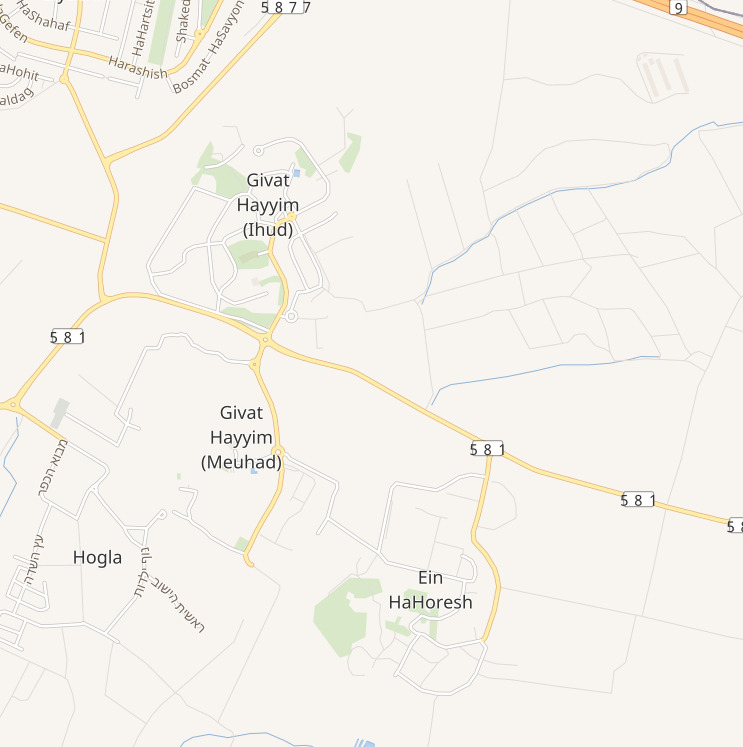
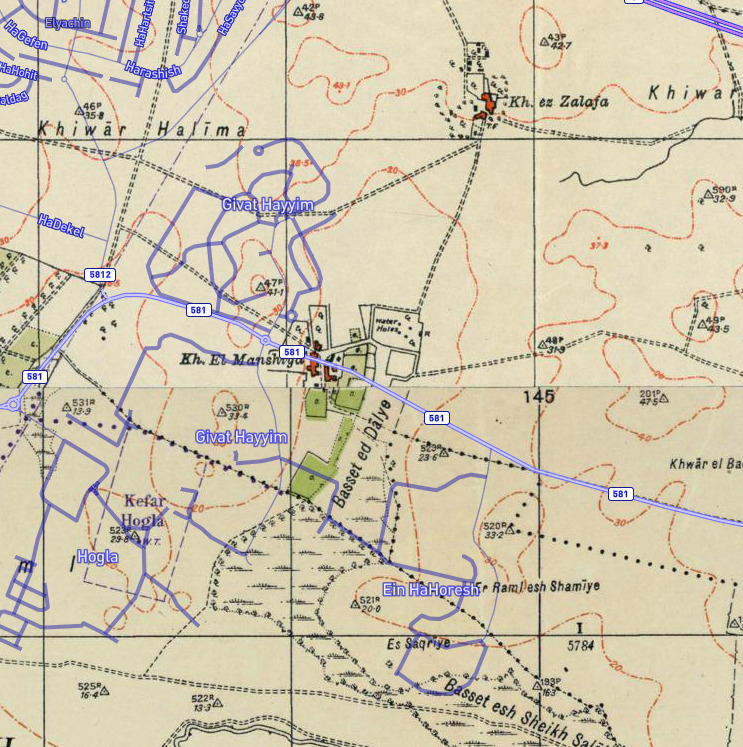
- 1870s map 1940s map modern map 1940s with modern overlay map A series of historical maps of the area around Khirbat al-Majdal (click the buttons)

- Location within Mandatory Palestine
- Coordinates: 32°23′39″N 34°56′15″E
- Palestine grid: 149/201
- Geopolitical entity: Mandatory Palestine
- Subdistrict: Tulkarm

Khirbat al-Majdal was a Palestinian Arab village in the Tulkarm Subdistrict. It was depopulated during the 1947–48 Civil War in Mandatory Palestine on March 1, 1948, under Operation Coastal Clearing. It was located 10 km northwest of Tulkarm.

== History ==
Khirbat al-Majdal was located on the Crusader place called Megedallum. The site had a well, around which bedouin gradually settled.

The village had a shrine for a local sage known by al-Shaykh Abdallah. Today, Sde Yitzhaq is located near the village lands, but on land belonging to Raml Zayta.

== Bibliography ==
- Khalidi, W. (1992). All That Remains: The Palestinian Villages Occupied and Depopulated by Israel in 1948. Washington D.C.: Institute for Palestine Studies. ISBN 0-88728-224-5.
