= RAML =

RAML or Raml may refer to:

- RAML (software) (RESTful API Modeling Language), a YAML based language for describing RESTful APIs
- Michael Raml (born 1987), Austrian politician

== See also ==
- Raml Zayta, a former Palestinian Arab village
