= July 2005 HaSharon Mall suicide bombing =

Terrorist incident in Netanya, Israel

Coordinates: 32.3266°N 34.8621°E

July 2005 HaSharon Mall bombing
- Part of the Second Intifada militancy campaign
- The attack site
- Native name: הפיגוע בכניסה לקניון השרון (יולי 2005)
- Location: Netanya, Israel
- Date: July 12, 2005; 21 years ago 6:35 pm (GMT+2)
- Attack type: Suicide bombing
- Weapon: 10 kilograms (22 lb) suicide vest
- Deaths: 5 Israeli civilians (+1 bomber)
- Injuries: 90+ Israeli civilians
- Perpetrator: Islamic Jihad claimed responsibility

The July 2005 HaSharon Mall bombing was a Palestinian suicide bombing which occurred on July 12, 2005 in the HaSharon Mall in Netanya, Israel. 5 civilians were killed in the attack.

The Palestinian Islamist militant organization Islamic Jihad claimed responsibility for the attack.

== Attack ==
During the late afternoon of July 12, 2005, 18-year-old Palestinian student Ahmad Abu-Halil, from the West Bank village of Attil, approached the popular HaSharon Mall in the center of the Israeli coastal city of Netanya. He was wearing explosives hidden underneath his clothes, then detonated himself at about 6:35 pm on a pedestrian crossing after approaching a group of four young women who were crossing the road.

Three women were killed in the attack. An IDF corporal and another woman subsequently died of their injuries. In addition, about 90 people were injured in the attack, five seriously. The explosion which occurred in a busy intersection outside of the mall during the evening rush hour also caused damage to many of the nearby automobiles, and in addition, some of the shopping center's windows were shattered.

After the attack, local police stated that the suicide bomber carried around 10 kg of explosives, as well as nails and metal pellets, on an explosive belt that was strapped to his body. Netanya's mayor, Miriam Fierberg, was present on the scene of the attack and immediately began assisting the injured.

== Perpetrator ==
Palestinian Islamist militant organization Islamic Jihad (PIJ) claimed responsibility for the attack, which the organization stated was carried out by 18-year-old Palestinian student Ahmad Abu-Halil from the West Bank village of Attil.

== See also ==
- 2001 HaSharon Mall suicide bombing
- December 2005 HaSharon Mall suicide bombing
