= Al-Manshiyya, Tulkarm =

Al-Manshiyya المنشية Khirbet Manshiya
- Village
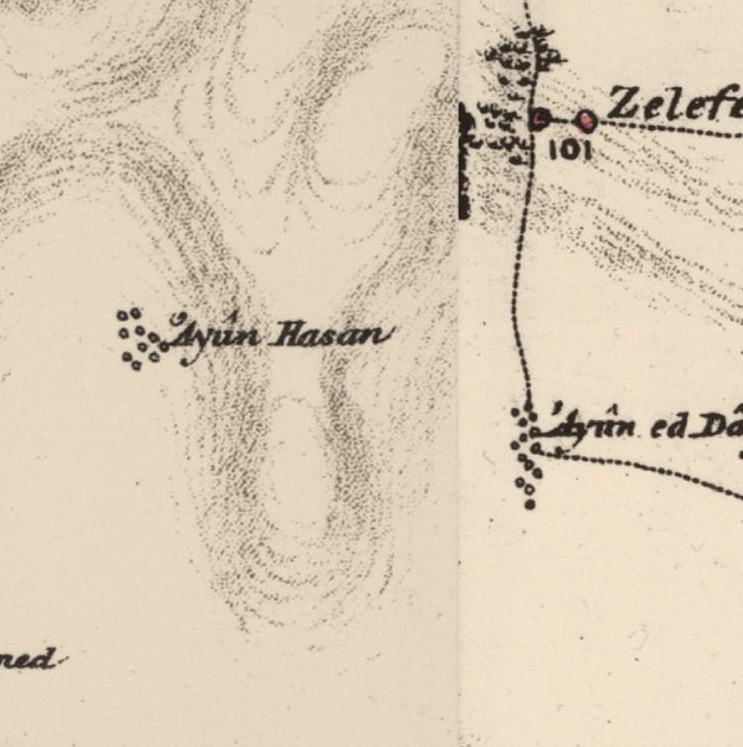
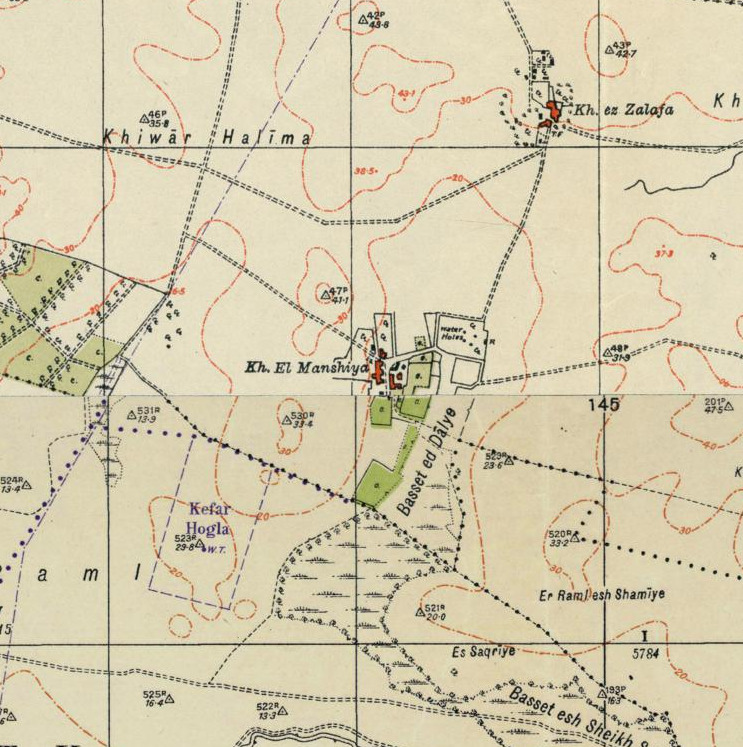
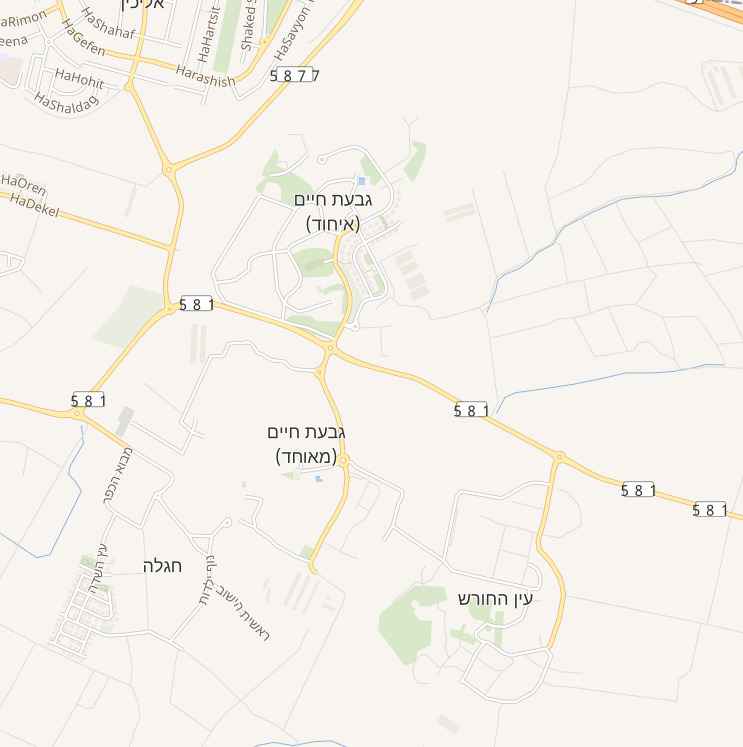
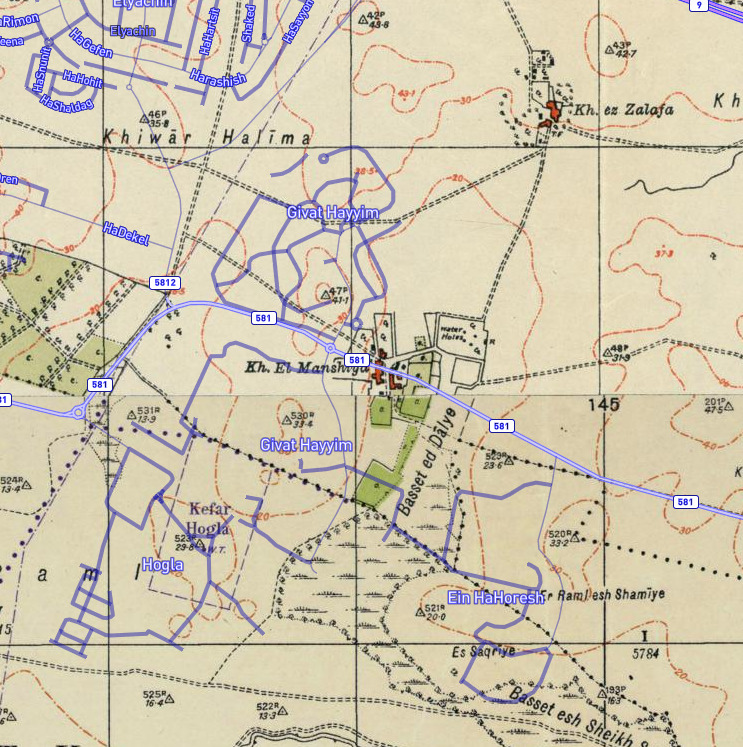
- 1870s map 1940s map modern map 1940s with modern overlay map A series of historical maps of the area around Al-Manshiyya, Tulkarm (click the buttons)

- Location within Mandatory Palestine
- Coordinates: 32°23′40″N 34°56′5″E
- Palestine grid: 144/200
- Geopolitical entity: Mandatory Palestine
- Subdistrict: Tulkarm
- Date of depopulation: April 15, 1948

Area
  - Total: 16,770 dunams (16.77 km^{2}; 6.47 sq mi)

Population (1945)
  - Total: 260
- Cause(s) of depopulation: Fear of being caught up in the fighting
- Current Localities: Ein ha-Horesh, Giv'at Chayirn, and Ahituv

Al-Manshiyya (Arabic: المنشية), also known as Khirbat Manshiyya, was a Palestinian Arab village in the Tulkarm Subdistrict. It was depopulated during the 1947–48 Civil War in Mandatory Palestine on April 15, 1948, under Operation Coastal Clearing. It was located 12.5 km northwest of Tulkarm.

== History ==
The villagers traced their origin to Abasan, in the Gaza district.

=== British Mandate era ===
In the 1922 census of Palestine conducted by the British Mandate authorities, Manshiyeh had a population of 94 Muslims, while in the 1931 census the village was counted under Attil, together with Jalama and Zalafa.

Ein ha-Horesh and Giv'at Chayirn were founded in 1931 and 1932 on what traditionally had been village land.

In the 1945 statistics, it had a population of 260 Muslims, with a total of 16,770 dunums of land. Of this, Arabs used 1 dunam for citrus and bananas, 12 were plantations and irrigated land, 12,485 were for cereals, while total of 437 dunams were classified as “non-cultivable” areas.

=== 1948, aftermath ===
In December 1947, villagers from Al-Manshiyya approached Givat Haim to conclude a local non-belligerent agreement.

In April 1948, Haganah had established policy of "cleaning out" the local Arabs from the coastal area. The villagers of Al-Manshiyya evacuated eastwards, apparently after "reaching an agreement with Haganah representatives that Jewish settlements would safeguard their property and allow them to return after the war."

However, on 12 April 1948, even before the village was evacuated, the "Committee for new settlements" had destined Al-Manshiyya to be the location of a new, Jewish settlement.

In 1951 Ahituv was founded on the land of Al-Manshiyya.

In 1992 the village remains were described: "A paved street bisects the site. The Israeli settlement of Giv'at Chayyim lies on both sides of this street, and there is a large cow barn at the southern end of it. Cactuses grow near the village entrance. Stones from the destroyed village houses are used as boundaries between flower beds, especially those lying along the street. Cotton, pistachios, and fruits are grown on the surrounding land."

== Bibliography ==
- Barron, J. B., ed. (1923). Palestine: Report and General Abstracts of the Census of 1922. Government of Palestine.
- Department of Statistics (1945). Village Statistics, April, 1945. Government of Palestine.
- Hadawi, S. (1970). Village Statistics of 1945: A Classification of Land and Area ownership in Palestine. Palestine Liberation Organization Research Center. Archived from the original on 2018-12-08.
- Khalidi, W. (1992). All That Remains: The Palestinian Villages Occupied and Depopulated by Israel in 1948. Washington D.C.: Institute for Palestine Studies. ISBN 0-88728-224-5.
- Mills, E., ed. (1932). Census of Palestine 1931. Population of Villages, Towns and Administrative Areas. Jerusalem: Government of Palestine.
- Morris, B. (2004). The Birth of the Palestinian Refugee Problem Revisited. Cambridge University Press. ISBN 978-0-521-00967-6.
