= December 2005 HaSharon Mall suicide bombing =

Terrorist incident in Netanya, Israel

December 2005 HaSharon Mall bombing
- Part of the Second Intifada militancy campaign
- The attack site
- Location: 32°19′35″N 34°51′44″E; Netanya, Israel
- Date: December 5, 2005; 20 years ago 11:30 am (GMT+2)
- Attack type: Suicide bombing
- Deaths: 5 Israeli civilians (+1 bomber)
- Injuries: 40+ Israeli civilians
- Perpetrator: Islamic Jihad claimed responsibility

The December 2005 HaSharon Mall bombing was a terror attack carried out on December 5, 2005, in the HaSharon Mall in Netanya, Israel. Five people were killed and over forty injured in the attack.

The Palestinian Islamist militant organization Islamic Jihad claimed responsibility for the attack.

== The attack ==
On Monday, 5 December 2005, at around 11:30 am, a Palestinian suicide bomber approached the entrance to the HaSharon Mall in the Israeli coastal city of Netanya; he detonated explosives hidden under his clothes when he approached the guards at the entrance for security inspection. Five people were killed in the attack, and more than 40 injured.

The Palestinian Islamic Jihad claimed responsibility and identified the attacker as Lotfi Abu Saada, from the village of Illar in northern West Bank. In response, Israel killed two senior militants in a Gaza airstrike.

== Reactions ==
- Palestine: Palestinian Authority leader Mahmoud Abbas denounced the attack, stating, "This operation against civilians causes the most serious harm to our commitment to the peace process and the Palestinian Authority will not go easy on whoever is found to be responsible for this operation."
- Israel: Israeli Foreign Minister Silvan Shalom stated that the attack was "additional proof of the inaction of the Palestinian Authority under [Abbas]. Israel can’t stand a continuation of the spilling of blood in the cities and the Qassam attacks."

== Aftermath ==
After the attack, Israel closed off the West Bank and Gaza Strip. Israeli Defense Minister Shaul Mofaz approved the resumption of targeted killings of Islamic Jihad operatives, which had been suspended for several months in the West Bank. He also ordered the IDF to regain control of areas in the West Bank controlled by PIJ.

The IDF also planned a large operation in Gaza in retaliation, the first such operation following the Israeli disengagement from the Gaza Strip in September.

== See also ==
- 2001 HaSharon Mall suicide bombing
- HaSharon Mall suicide bombing (July 12, 2005)
