= Lehavot =

Lehavot, a Hebrew word meaning flames, may refer to the following places in Israel:

- Lehavot HaBashan
- Lehavot Haviva
