= Michael Schilchegger =

Austrian politician (born 1985)

Member of the National Council
- Incumbent
- Assumed office 24 October 2024
- Constituency: Greater Linz

Member of the Federal Council
- In office 7 March 2019 – 22 October 2021
- Nominated by: Landtag of Upper Austria
- Preceded by: Michael Raml

Personal details
- Born: 4 August 1985 (age 40)
- Party: Freedom Party

Michael Schilchegger (born 4 August 1985) is an Austrian politician of the Freedom Party. He has been a member of the National Council since 2024, and was a member of the Federal Council from 2019 to 2021.
