= Khirbat Zalafa =

Khirbat Zalafa خربة زلفة Khirbet Zalafa, Zalafa
- Etymology: "The cistern"
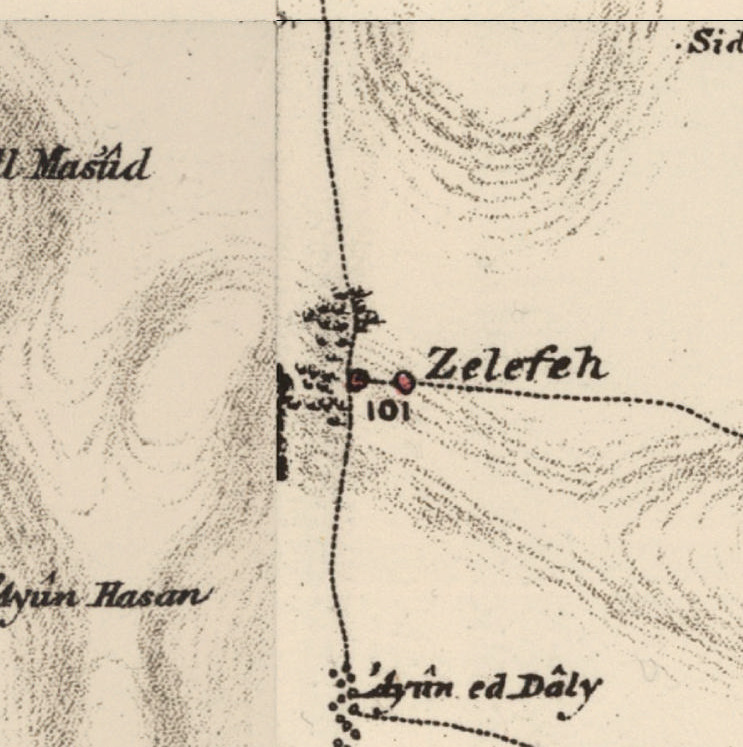
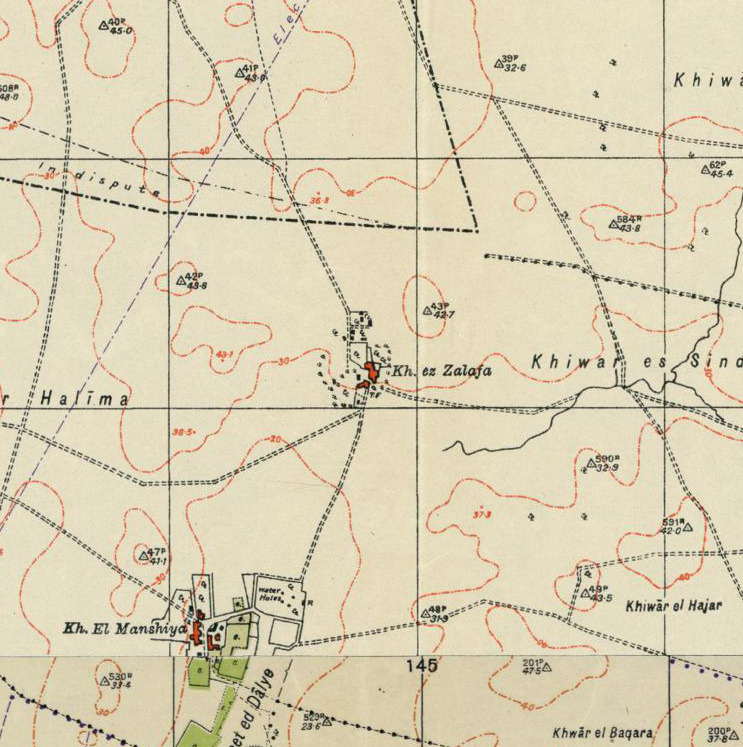
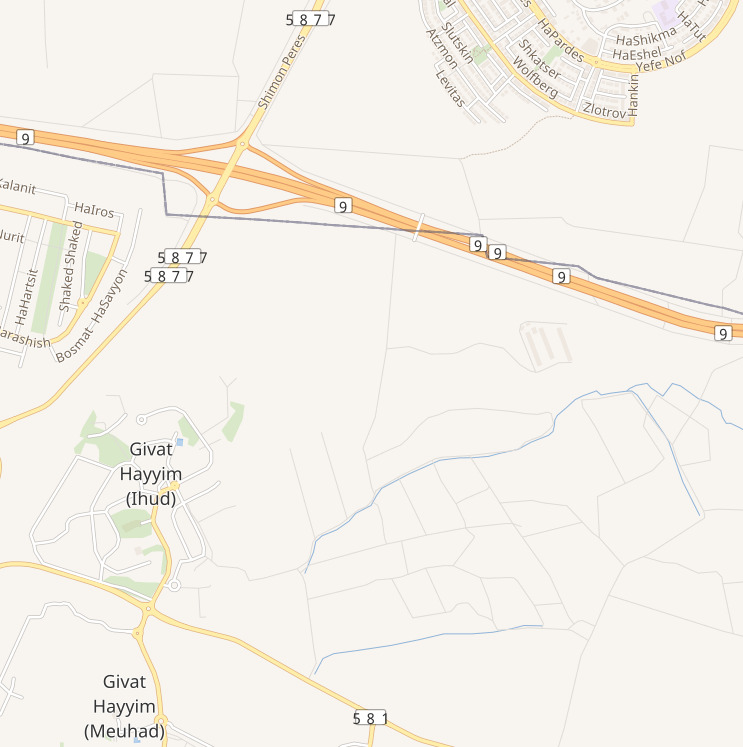
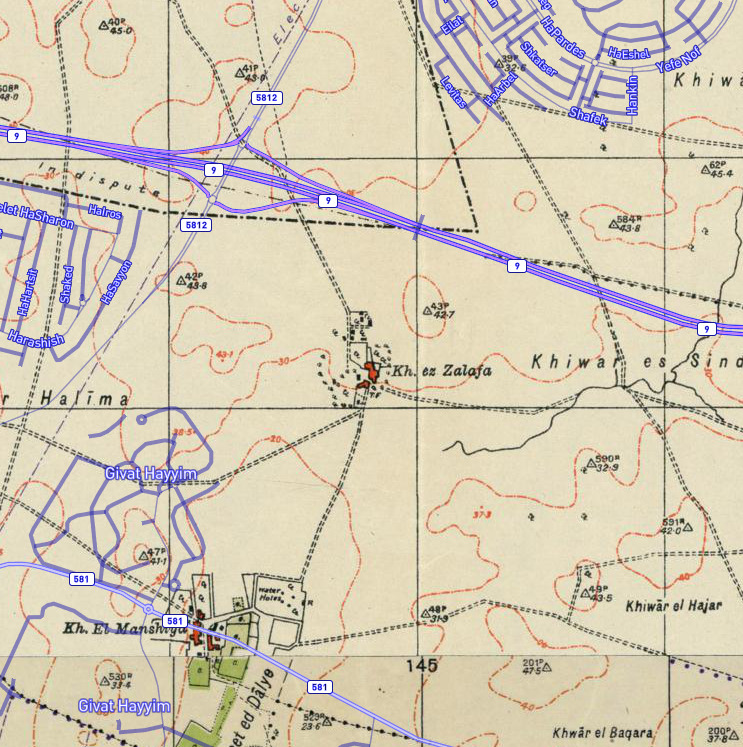
- 1870s map 1940s map modern map 1940s with modern overlay map A series of historical maps of the area around Khirbat Zalafa (click the buttons)

- Location within Mandatory Palestine
- Coordinates: 32°24′14″N 34°56′33″E
- Palestine grid: 144/201
- Geopolitical entity: Mandatory Palestine
- Subdistrict: Tulkarm
- Date of depopulation: April 15, 1948

Area (6,865 Arab, 617 Jewish, 231 Public)
  - Total: 7,713 dunams (7.713 km^{2}; 2.978 sq mi)

Population (1945)
  - Total: 210
- Cause(s) of depopulation: Fear of being caught up in the fighting

Khirbat Zalafa (Arabic: خربة زلفة) was a small Palestinian village in the Tulkarm Subdistrict about 15 kilometers (9.3 mi) northwest of Tulkarm. It was depopulated during the 1948 Palestine war. It was occupied by Yishuv forces on April 15, 1948 as a part of operation "Coastal Clearing."

== History ==
Remains from a settlement dating to the Roman-Byzantine era have been found here.

In the modern era, the people of Khirbat Zalafa came from Attil to farm the village land. Gradually they settled down so they could be closer to their land. In the late 19th century, Khirbat Zalafa was described as a small hamlet with springs to the south.

Palestinian Rural History Project (PRHP) oral histories recorded infant jar-burials, commonly associated with nomads or itinerant workers of Egyptian origins.

== British Mandate era ==
In the 1922 census of Palestine there were 63 villagers, all Muslim. At the time of the 1931 census, the village was counted under Attil, together with Jalama and Al-Manshiyya.

The village had a small core of houses, with many dwellings scattered throughout on the agricultural lands. The agriculture was based on watermelons, vegetables, grain and olives.

By the 1944/45 statistics the village had 210 Muslims, while jurisdiction was 7,713 dunams, of which 6,865 was Arab owned, 617 was Jewish owned, while 231 was publicly owned. Of this, 6,798 dunums were allotted to cereals, 38 dunum was devoted to citrus and bananas ad 6 dunums were irrigated or used for orchards, while 3 dunams were classified as built-up, urban land.

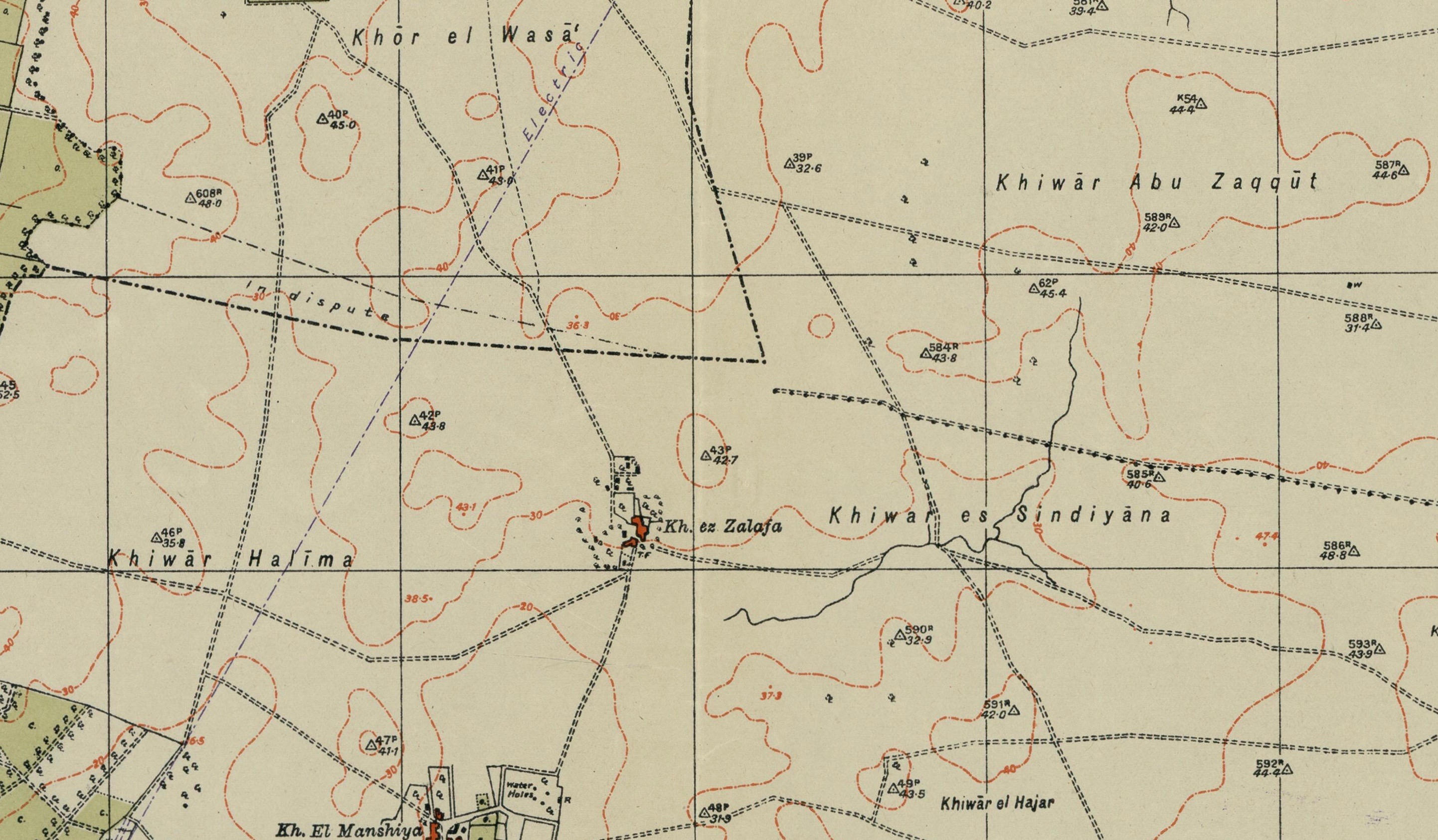
Khirbat Zalafa (Kh. ez Zalafa) 1942 1:20,000

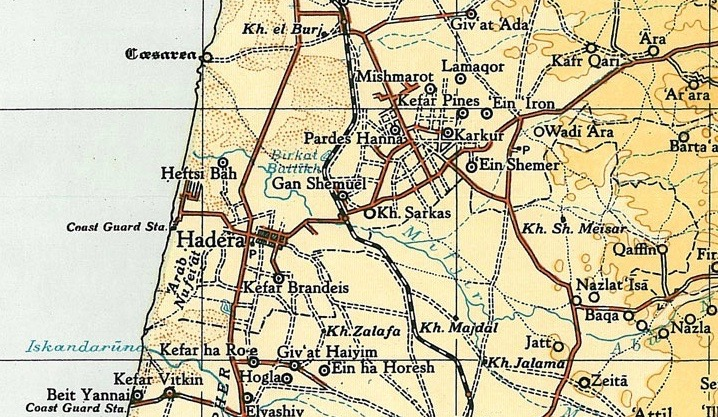
Khirbat Zalafa (Kh. Zalafa) 1945 1:250,000

== 1948 and after ==
The Palestinian historian Walid Khalidi described the village in 1992: "The village has been completely levelled. Both the original site and the surrounding lands are covered with Israeli citrus orchards."

There are no Israeli settlements on village land.

== See also ==
- Depopulated Palestinian locations in Israel

== Bibliography ==
- Barron, J. B., ed. (1923). Palestine: Report and General Abstracts of the Census of 1922. Government of Palestine.
- Conder, C.R; Kitchener, H.H. (1882). The Survey of Western Palestine: Memoirs of the Topography, Orography, Hydrography, and Archaeology. Vol. 2. London: Committee of the Palestine Exploration Fund.
- Department of Statistics (1945). Village Statistics, April, 1945. Government of Palestine.
- Hadawi, S. (1970). Village Statistics of 1945: A Classification of Land and Area ownership in Palestine. Palestine Liberation Organization Research Center. Archived from the original on 2018-12-08.
- Khalidi, W. (1992). All That Remains: The Palestinian Villages Occupied and Depopulated by Israel in 1948. Washington D.C.: Institute for Palestine Studies. ISBN 0-88728-224-5.
- Mills, E., ed. (1932). Census of Palestine 1931. Population of Villages, Towns and Administrative Areas. Jerusalem: Government of Palestine.
- Morris, B. (2004). The Birth of the Palestinian Refugee Problem Revisited. Cambridge University Press. ISBN 978-0-521-00967-6. (p. 245 #635 on p. 298 and The migratory movement..., pp. 21, 23)
- Palmer, E.H. (1881). The Survey of Western Palestine: Arabic and English Name Lists Collected During the Survey by Lieutenants Conder and Kitchener, R. E. Transliterated and Explained by E.H. Palmer. Committee of the Palestine Exploration Fund.
- Tsafrir, Y.; Leah Di Segni; Judith Green (1994). (TIR): Tabula Imperii Romani: Judaea, Palaestina. Jerusalem: Israel Academy of Sciences and Humanities. ISBN 965-208-107-8.

== External links and references ==
- Welcome To Zalafa, Khirbat
- Khirbat Zalafa, Zochrot
- Survey of Western Palestine, Map 11: IAA, Wikimedia commons
- Zalafa, Khirbat, from the Khalil Sakakini Cultural Center
