= Wadi Qabbani =

Wadi Qabbani وادي قباني
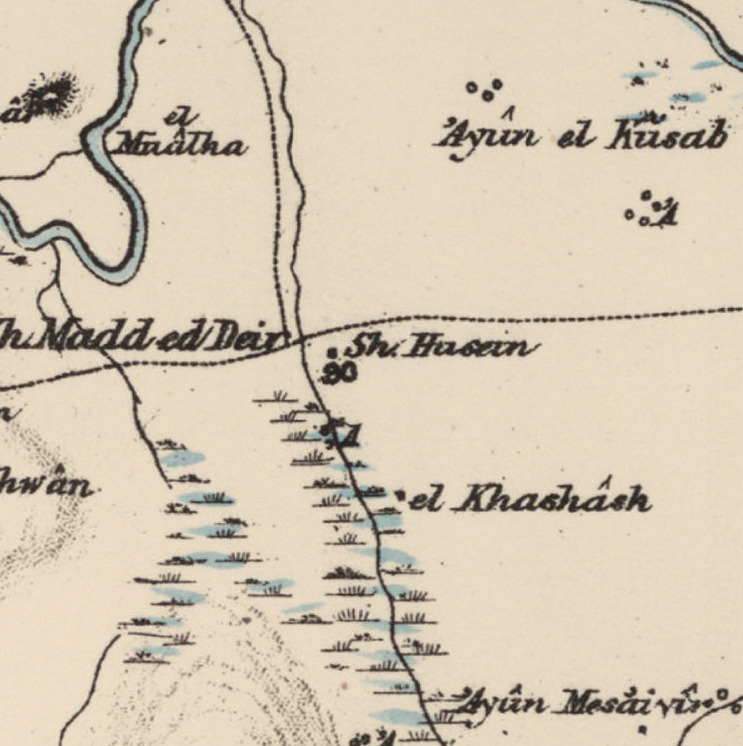
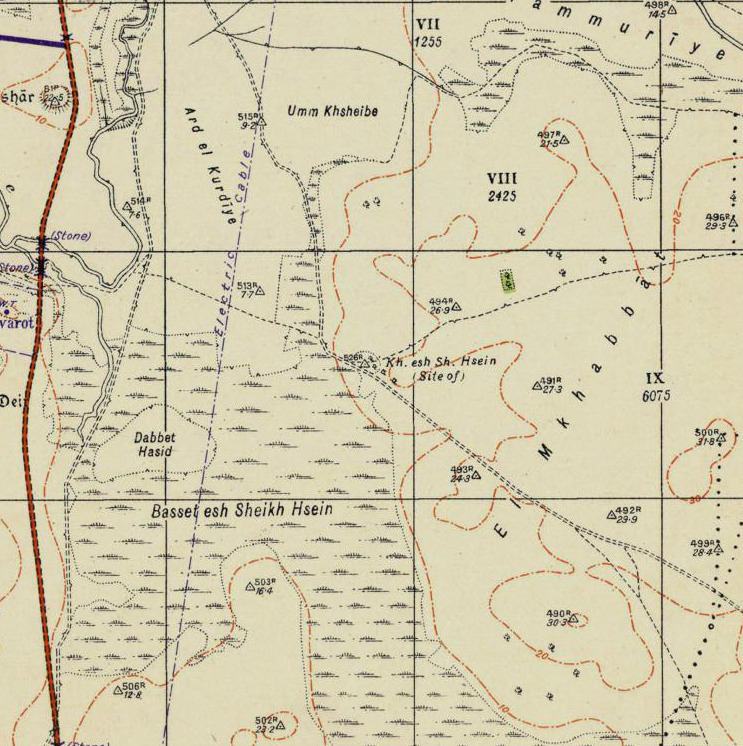
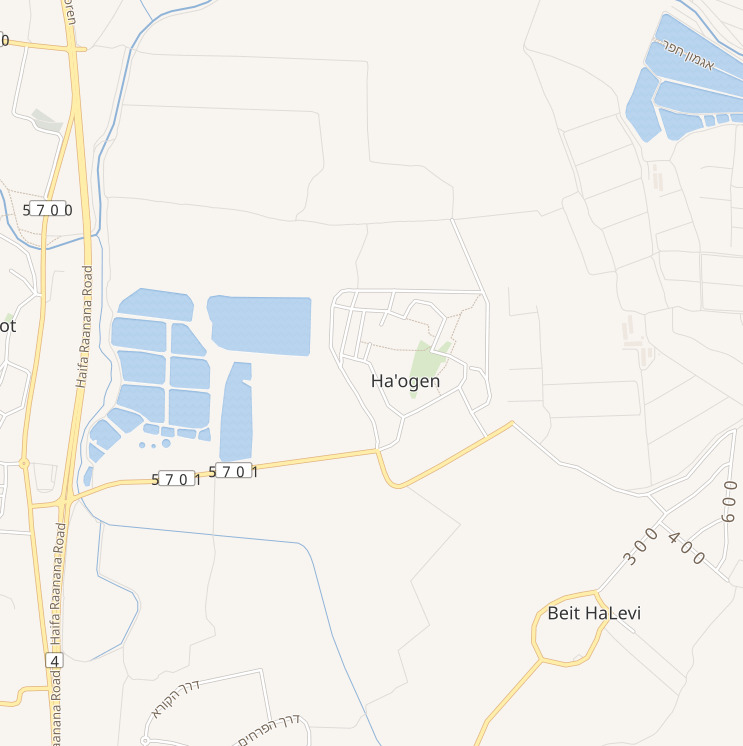
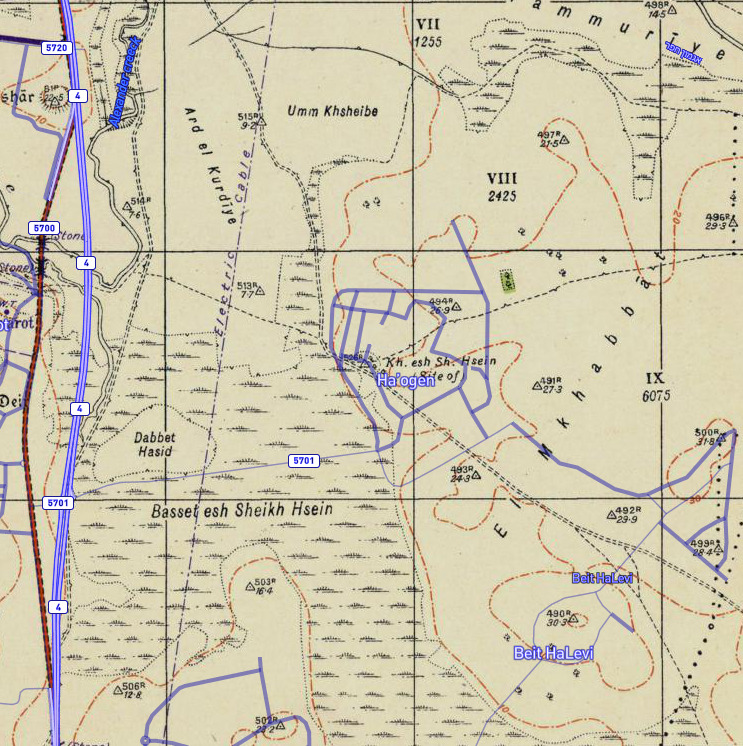
- 1870s map 1940s map modern map 1940s with modern overlay map A series of historical maps of the area around Wadi Qabbani (click the buttons)

- Location within Mandatory Palestine
- Coordinates: 32°21′44″N 34°55′18″E
- Palestine grid: 142/196
- Geopolitical entity: Mandatory Palestine
- Subdistrict: Tulkarm
- Date of depopulation: Not known

Area
  - Total: 9,812 dunams (9.812 km^{2}; 3.788 sq mi)

Population (1945)
  - Total: 320
- Current Localities: HaOgen

Wadi Qabbani (Arabic: وادي قباني), also known as Khirbat ash Sheik Husein (Arabic: خربة الشيخ حسين) was a Palestinian Arab village in the Tulkarm Subdistrict. It was probably depopulated during the 1947–48 Civil War in Mandatory Palestine on March 1, 1948, as part of Operation Coastal Clearing. It was located 12 km northwest of Tulkarm. The name, Qabbani came from the Lebanese family who owned most of the land.

== History ==
=== British Mandate era ===
In the 1945 statistics the village had a total population of 210 Muslims with a total of 9,812 dunams of land.

The land ownership of the village before occupation in dunams:

Owner	Dunams
Arab	427
Jewish	9,276
Public	109
Total	9,812

Of this, Arabs used 408 dunums for cereals, while a total of 1,301 dunams were classified as non-cultivable land.

Types of land use in dunams in the village in 1945:

Land Usage	Arab	Jewish	Public
Citrus and bananas	-	46	-
Irrigated and plantation	-	-	-
Cereal	408	8,057	-
Urban	-	-	-
Cultivable	408	8,103	-
Non-cultivable	19	1,173	109

== Bibliography ==
- Department of Statistics (1945). Village Statistics, April, 1945. Government of Palestine.
- Hadawi, S. (1970). Village Statistics of 1945: A Classification of Land and Area ownership in Palestine. Palestine Liberation Organization Research Center.
- Khalidi, W. (1992). All That Remains: The Palestinian Villages Occupied and Depopulated by Israel in 1948. Washington D.C.: Institute for Palestine Studies. ISBN 0-88728-224-5.
- Morris, B. (2004). The Birth of the Palestinian Refugee Problem Revisited. Cambridge University Press. ISBN 978-0-521-00967-6.
