= 2001 HaSharon Mall suicide bombing =

Terrorist incident in Netanya, Israel

Coordinates: 32.3266°N 34.8621°E

2001 HaSharon Mall bombing
- Part of the Second Intifada militancy campaign
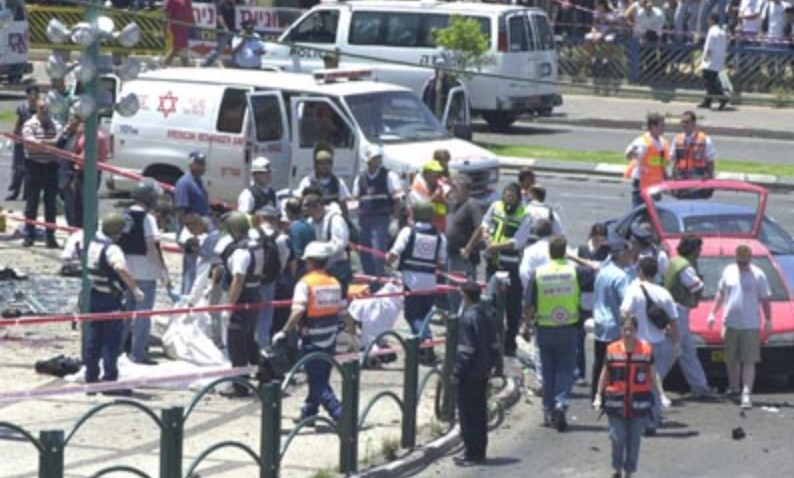

- Location: Netanya, Israel
- Date: May 18, 2001; 11:30 am (GMT+2)
- Attack type: suicide bombing
- Deaths: 5 (+ 1 bomber)
- Injuries: 100+
- Perpetrator: Hamas claimed responsibility

The 2001 HaSharon Mall bombing was a Palestinian suicide bombing which occurred on May 18, 2001, in the HaSharon Mall in Netanya, Israel. Six people were killed in the attack.

The Palestinian Islamist militant organization Hamas said they were responsible for the attack.

== The attack ==
On Friday, May 18, 2001 at 11:30 am, a Palestinian suicide bomber wearing a long blue jacket hiding explosives attached to his body approached the popular HaSharon Mall in the center of Netanya. He was approached by the mall's security guard, who prevented him from entering the mall; the bomber immediately detonated his explosives at the entrance to the mall, killing six people including himself and injuring more than 50.

== Victims ==
The victims who were killed were:

- Tirza Polonsky, 66, of Moshav Kfar Haim
- Miriam Waxman, 51, of Hadera
- David Yarkoni, 53, of Netanya
- Yulia Tratiakova, 21, of Netanya
- Vladislav Sorokin, 34, of Netanya

== Aftermath ==
Following the attack Israeli fighter jets attacked Palestinian security forces headquarters in the West Bank, killing 12. The attack marks the first use of Israeli warplanes against Palestinians in the West Bank and Gaza since the 1967 war.

== See also ==
- HaSharon Mall suicide bombing (December 5, 2005)
- HaSharon Mall suicide bombing (July 12, 2005)
