= Attil =

Palestinian town, Tulkarm Governate, West Bank, State of Palestine

- Palestinian town

Arabic transcription(s)
  - Arabic: عتيل
- Location of Attil within Palestine
- Coordinates: 32°22′10″N 35°04′18″E
- Palestine grid: 156/197
- State: State of Palestine
- Governorate: Tulkarm

Government
  - Type: Municipality

Area
  - Total: 7.3 km^{2} (2.8 sq mi)

Population (2017)
  - Total: 10,367
  - Density: 1,400/km^{2} (3,700/sq mi)
- Name meaning: Attil, "severe"

Attil (Arabic: عتيل) is a Palestinian town in the Tulkarm Governorate in the eastern West Bank, 12 km (7.5 mi) northeast of Tulkarm. Attil is the connection point between the other villages and Tulkarm. It is bordered by Illar to the east; Baqa ash-Sharqiyya to the north; The Green Line to the west; and Deir al-Ghusun to the south. Mountains surrounding the town include the Nabhan, Aboora, Asad, and Shehadeh mountains. Attil has an elevation of 100 m (330 ft) above Sea level, and an area of 7.337 km^{2}.

== Etymology ==
According to Palmer, the name was a p.n.(="proper name"), meaning "severe", while according to Zertal the name 'Attil almost certainly has its origins in the Hebrew form a-tl or ttl (tell), appearing in the Hebrew Bible and even more commonly in the Samaria Ostraca as a prefix to place names.

== History ==
Attil is an ancient village site on a hill at the edge of the plains. Pottery remain have been found here from Middle Bronze Age II, Iron Age I and IA II, Persian, Hellenistic, early and late Roman, Byzantine, early Muslim and the Middle Ages have been found here. Fragmentary mosaic floors and column shafts from a church have been found, together with cisterns dug into the rock, as well as caves.

Atil is referenced in The Continuation of the Samaritan Chronicle of Abu l-Fath, suggesting it was an important Samaritan settlement during the early Islamic period. The text describes a battle at Attil, where Abū Ḥarb al-Yamānī, who rebelled against Abbasid rule in the 840s, was ultimately defeated. The intense bloodshed rendered the village impure to an extent that purification appeared unlikely. However, a Samaritan leader named Pinhas, who was a jurist, undertook the task of purifying the village due to its large size, since it was one of the largest villages, and eventually restored its purity.

In 1179, it was mentioned in Crusader sources as Azatil. In March 1265, when Sultan Baibars awarded his officers lands, he gave Attil “To the Atabek Faris al-Din Uqtay al-Salihi“.

=== Ottoman era ===
Attil, like the rest of Palestine, was incorporated into the Ottoman Empire in 1517, and in the census of 1596 it was a part of the nahiya ("subdistrict") of Jabal Sami which was under the administration of the liwa ("district") of Nablus. The village had a population of 59 households, all Muslim, and paid taxes on wheat, barley, summer crops, olive trees, occasional revenues, beehives and/or goats, an olive oil press, or press for grape syrup, and a poll tax; a total of 14,872 akçe.

In the 16th century, the neighboring village of Beit Sama was listed as inhabited, but it became abandoned before the 19th century, with its land being absorbed by Attil and Illar.

In 1838 it was noted as a village, 'Attil, in the western Esh-Sha'rawiyeh administrative region, north of Nablus.

In the late Ottoman period, in 1852, the American scholar Edward Robinson described passing by the villages of Zeita and Jatt on the way to 'Attil. Of 'Attil itself, he writes that it was "a considerable village," located on a hill with plains to the north and south. He further noted: ”It appears, that the land in the district of Nabulus including the plains, is generally freehold; and the taxes are mainly paid in the form of a poll tax.”

In 1863, the French explorer Victor Guérin passed by and noted that the village was also called Deir Attil.

In 1870/1871 (1288 AH), an Ottoman census listed the village in the nahiya (sub-district) of al-Sha'rawiyya al-Gharbiyya.

In 1882 the PEF's Survey of Western Palestine described the village as being of considerable size, situated on a hill on the edge of the plain, and surrounded by a small olive-grove, and supplied by cisterns.

=== British Mandate era ===
In the 1922 census of Palestine conducted by the British Mandate authorities, Attil had a population of 1,656, all Muslims. At the time of the 1931 census of Palestine, Attil, together with Jalama, Al-Manshiyya and Zalafa had a total of 2207 persons, all Muslim except 1 Druze, living in 473 houses.

During the Great Arab Revolt in 1938, an armed company of rebels—allegedly drawn from Caesarea, Irtah, or ‘Attil—kidnapped the Greek-Cypriot priest Hanna al-Khuri and his younger brother; the captives were taken toward Tulkarm and murdered.

In the 1945 statistics the population of Attil was 2,650, all Muslims, who owned 7,337 dunams of land according to an official land and population survey. 4,011 dunams were plantations and irrigable land, 2,527 used for cereals, while 86 dunams were built-up (urban) land.

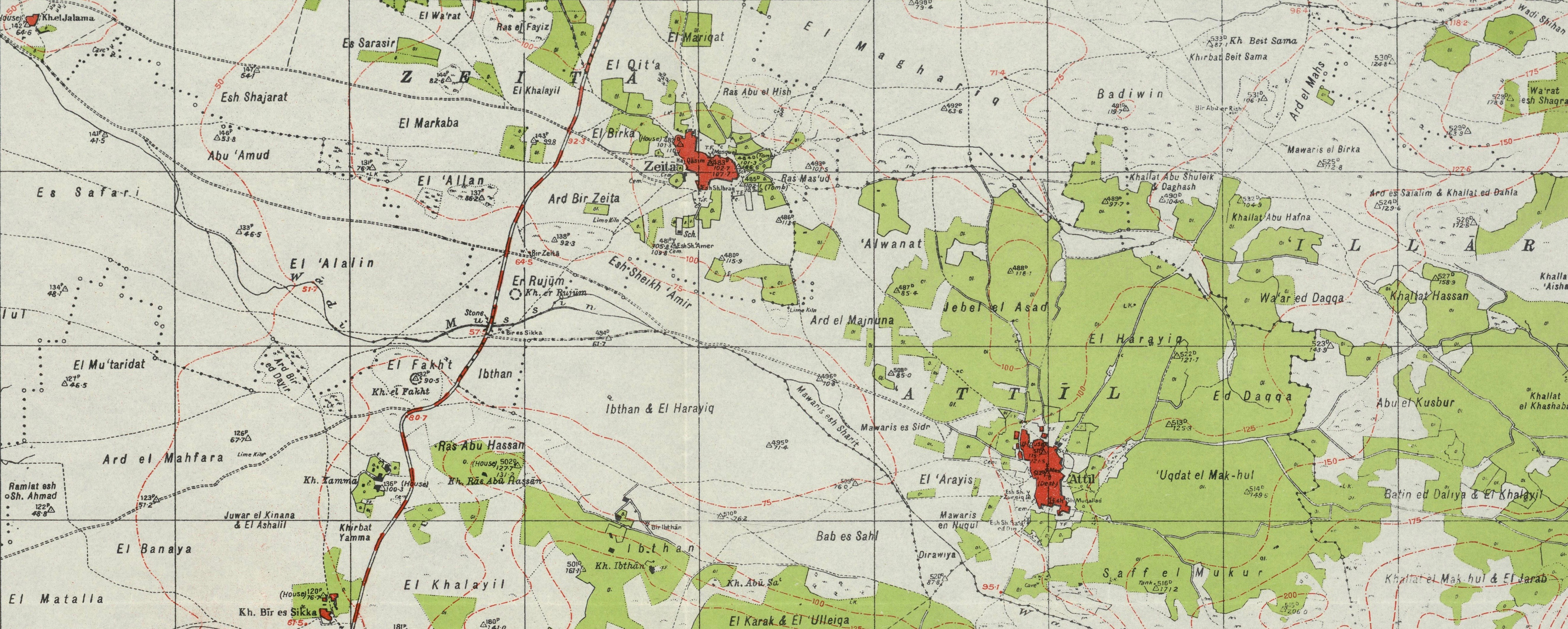
Attil 1942 1:20,000

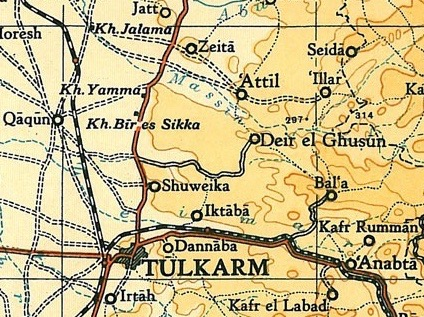
Attil 1945 1:250,000

=== Jordanian era ===
In the wake of the 1948 Arab–Israeli War, and after the 1949 Armistice Agreements, Attil came under Jordanian rule. It was annexed by Jordan in 1950.

In 1961, the population was 4,087.

=== Post-1967 ===
Since the Six-Day War in 1967, Attil has been under Israeli occupation.

==== Population ====
Attil had a population of 9,038 in the 2007 census by the Palestinian Central Bureau of Statistics. The majority of its people are expatriates living in Jordan, various states in the Persian Gulf, the United States, Europe, and other parts of the world. By 2017, the population had increased to 10,367.

== Tomb ==
The village of Attil is the site of a tomb known as Mazar ash-Sheikh Zreiq, situated near the town hall. This tomb belongs to Ahmad Ibn Abi Zreiq a-Rifa'i al-Husseini, who, according to local tradition, was the supreme religious judge (qadi) of Safed and died in Attil in 1440. Hailing from the prominent al-Attili family, he was considered one of the village's most distinguished individuals. The fence surrounding the tomb bears an inscription stating that it was constructed in 1779 by Abd al-Rahman, a descendant of the sheikh, indicating that the tomb itself predates this structure.

It is said that Ahmad Ibn Abi Zreiq a-Rifa'i al-Husseini was the leader of a local Sufi order known as Tariqat al-Attil, which he inherited from his grandfather. He was renowned for performing miracles, including the ability to lie down in the village yard while horses would jump over him without causing any harm.

== Demography ==
Residents of the village originally came from many places, such as Lebanon, Egypt, Khan Yunis (Gaza), Hajjah (West Bank) and more.

== Bibliography ==
- Barron, J.B., ed. (1923). Palestine: Report and General Abstracts of the Census of 1922. Government of Palestine.
- Conder, C.R.; Kitchener, H.H. (1882). The Survey of Western Palestine: Memoirs of the Topography, Orography, Hydrography, and Archaeology. Vol. 2. London: Committee of the Palestine Exploration Fund.
- Dauphin, C. (1998). La Palestine byzantine, Peuplement et Populations. BAR International Series 726 (in French). Vol. III : Catalogue. Oxford: Archeopress. ISBN 0-860549-05-4.
- Government of Jordan, Department of Statistics (1964). First Census of Population and Housing. Volume I: Final Tables; General Characteristics of the Population (PDF).
- Government of Palestine, Department of Statistics (1945). Village Statistics, April, 1945.
- Guérin, V. (1875). Description Géographique Historique et Archéologique de la Palestine (in French). Vol. 2: Samarie, pt. 2. Paris: L'Imprimerie Nationale.
- Hadawi, S. (1970). Village Statistics of 1945: A Classification of Land and Area ownership in Palestine. Palestine Liberation Organization Research Centre.
- Hütteroth, W.-D.; Abdulfattah, K. (1977). Historical Geography of Palestine, Transjordan and Southern Syria in the Late 16th Century. Erlanger Geographische Arbeiten, Sonderband 5. Erlangen, Germany: Vorstand der Fränkischen Geographischen Gesellschaft. ISBN 3-920405-41-2.
- Ibn al-Furat (1971). J. Riley-Smith (ed.). Ayyubids, Mamluks and Crusaders: Selections from the "Tarikh Al-duwal Wal-muluk" of Ibn Al-Furat : the Text, the Translation. Vol. 2. Translation by Malcolm Cameron Lyons, Ursula Lyons. Cambridge: W. Heffer.
- Mills, E., ed. (1932). Census of Palestine 1931. Population of Villages, Towns and Administrative Areas. Jerusalem: Government of Palestine.
- Palmer, E.H. (1881). The Survey of Western Palestine: Arabic and English Name Lists Collected During the Survey by Lieutenants Conder and Kitchener, R. E. Transliterated and Explained by E.H. Palmer. Committee of the Palestine Exploration Fund.
- Robinson, E.; Smith, E. (1841). Biblical Researches in Palestine, Mount Sinai and Arabia Petraea: A Journal of Travels in the year 1838. Vol. 3. Boston: Crocker & Brewster.
- Robinson, E.; Smith, E. (1856). Later Biblical Researches in Palestine and adjacent regions: A Journal of Travels in the year 1852. London: John Murray.
- Röhricht, R. (1887). "Studien zur mittelalterlichen Geographie und Topographie Syriens". Zeitschrift des Deutschen Palästina-Vereins. 10: 195–344.
- Zertal, A. (2016). The Manasseh Hill Country Survey. Vol. 3. Boston: BRILL. ISBN 978-9004312302.
