= Illar, Tulkarm =

'Illar
- Municipality type C

Arabic transcription(s)
  - Arabic: عِلار
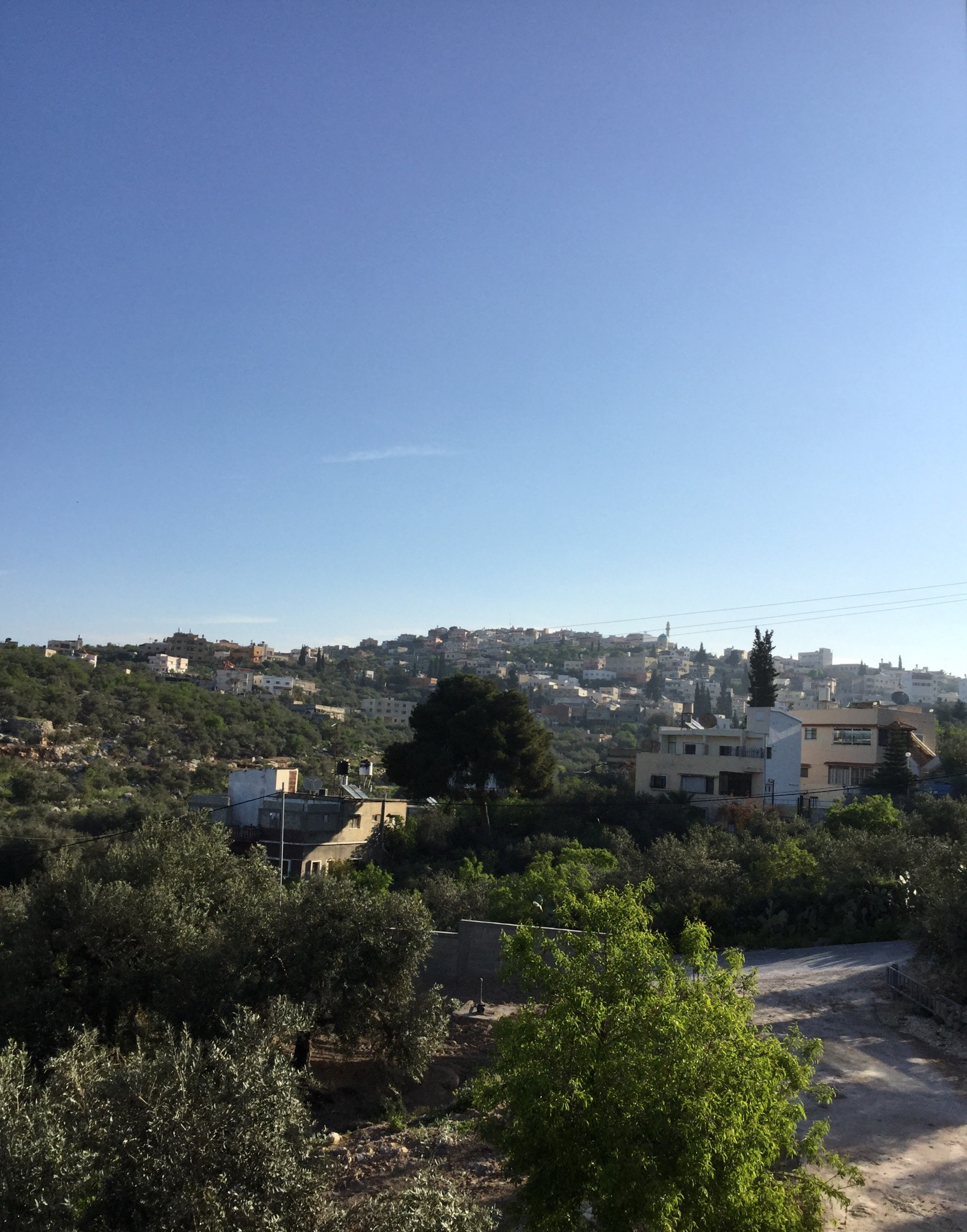

- Location of 'Illar within Palestine
- Coordinates: 32°22′13″N 35°06′27″E
- Palestine grid: 160/197
- State: State of Palestine
- Governorate: Tulkarm

Government
  - Type: Municipality

Area
  - Total: 14 km^{2} (5.4 sq mi)

Population (2017)
  - Total: 7,456
  - Density: 530/km^{2} (1,400/sq mi)
- Name meaning: from personal name

'Illar (Arabic: عِلار) is a Palestinian town in the Tulkarm Governorate in the northern West Bank, located 10 kilometers northeast of Tulkarm, and 25 kilometers east of the Israeli city of Netanya. It is bordered by Attil to the west, Kafr Ra'i to the east, and the Israeli settlement of Hermesh to the north. According to the Palestinian Central Bureau of Statistics, 'Illar had a population of approximately 7,456 inhabitants in 2017. 6.6% of the population of 'Illar were refugees in 1997. The healthcare facilities for the surrounding villages are based in 'Illar, the facilities are designated as MOH level 2.

== History ==
Pottery remains from the Iron Age II, Hellenistic, early and late Roman, Byzantine, early Islamic period and the Middle Ages have been found here.

The ancient settlement's cemetery was in use from the Iron Age on into the Byzantine period; an Iron Age II burial cave was discovered there, displaying two rock-cut rooms that were likely used by an extended family from the 10th to 8th century BCE.

An ancient inscription written in the Hebrew alphabet was also found in 'Illar. The inscription states ‘Tomb of Menashe ben Yannai’. Scholars believe it marked the site of a Jewish or Samaritan tomb dating from the late Second Temple period, possibly to the time of Herod.

In 1200, during the Crusader era, it was known as Allar. In 1265, it was mentioned among the estates which Sultan Baibars granted his amirs after he had expelled the Crusaders. The whole of Illar was given to his emir Saif al-Din Qushtimur al-'Ajami.

=== Ottoman era ===
Illar, like the rest of Palestine, was incorporated into the Ottoman Empire in 1517, and in the census of 1596 it was a part of the nahiya ("subdistrict") of Jabal Sami, part of the Sanjak of Nablus. The village had a population of 41 households, all Muslim. The villagers paid a fixed tax-rate of 33,3% on agricultural products, such as wheat, barley, summer crops, olive trees, beehives and/or goats, in addition to polltax and miscellaneous; a total of 5,074 akçe. All of the revenue went to a Waqf.

In the 16th century, the neighboring village of Beit Sama was listed as inhabited, but it became abandoned before the 19th century, with its land being absorbed by Attil and 'Illar.

In 1838 it was noted as a villag

In 1838 'Ellar was noted as a village in the esh-Sharawiyeh esh-Shurkiyeh (the Eastern) district, north of Nablus.

In 1870/1871 (1288 AH), an Ottoman census listed the village in the nahiya (sub-district) of al-Sha'rawiyya al-Gharbiyya.

In 1882, the PEF's Survey of Western Palestine described it as "a small village on the side of a hill, with olives and wells."

=== British Mandate era ===
In the 1922 census of Palestine conducted by the British Mandate authorities, Allar had a population of 835, all Muslims, increasing in the 1931 census to 1047 Muslims, in 268 houses.

In the 1945 statistics the population of Illar was 1,450, all Muslims, with 13,981 dunams of land according to an official land and population survey. 4,432 dunams were plantations and irrigable land, 5,431 used for cereals, while 33 dunams were built-up (urban) land.

=== Jordanian era ===
In the wake of the 1948 Arab–Israeli War, and after the 1949 Armistice Agreements, Illar came under Jordanian rule.

In 1961, the population of Illar was 2,499.

=== Post-1967 ===
Since the Six-Day War in 1967, Illar has been under Israeli occupation.

After Oslo II Accord in 1995, Illar was placed under Area A of the West Bank under security and civil administration of the Palestinian National Authority.

== Bibliography ==
- Barron, J.B., ed. (1923). Palestine: Report and General Abstracts of the Census of 1922. Government of Palestine.
- Conder, C.R.; Kitchener, H.H. (1882). The Survey of Western Palestine: Memoirs of the Topography, Orography, Hydrography, and Archaeology. Vol. 2. London: Committee of the Palestine Exploration Fund.
- Government of Jordan, Department of Statistics (1964). First Census of Population and Housing. Volume I: Final Tables; General Characteristics of the Population (PDF).
- Government of Palestine, Department of Statistics (1945). Village Statistics, April, 1945.
- Hadawi, S. (1970). Village Statistics of 1945: A Classification of Land and Area ownership in Palestine. Palestine Liberation Organization Research Center.
- Hütteroth, W.-D.; Abdulfattah, K. (1977). Historical Geography of Palestine, Transjordan and Southern Syria in the Late 16th Century. Erlanger Geographische Arbeiten, Sonderband 5. Erlangen, Germany: Vorstand der Fränkischen Geographischen Gesellschaft. ISBN 3-920405-41-2.
- Ibn al-Furat (1971). J. Riley-Smith (ed.). Ayyubids, Mamluks and Crusaders: Selections from the "Tarikh Al-duwal Wal-muluk" of Ibn Al-Furat : the Text, the Translation. Vol. 2. Translation by Malcolm Cameron Lyons, Ursula Lyons. Cambridge: W. Heffer.
- Mills, E., ed. (1932). Census of Palestine 1931. Population of Villages, Towns and Administrative Areas. Jerusalem: Government of Palestine.
- Palmer, E.H. (1881). The Survey of Western Palestine: Arabic and English Name Lists Collected During the Survey by Lieutenants Conder and Kitchener, R. E. Transliterated and Explained by E.H. Palmer. Committee of the Palestine Exploration Fund.
- Robinson, E.; Smith, E. (1841). Biblical Researches in Palestine, Mount Sinai and Arabia Petraea: A Journal of Travels in the year 1838. Vol. 3. Boston: Crocker & Brewster.
- Zertal, A. (2016). The Manasseh Hill Country Survey. Vol. 3. Boston: BRILL. ISBN 978-9004312302.
