= Michael Raml =

Austrian politician (born 1987)

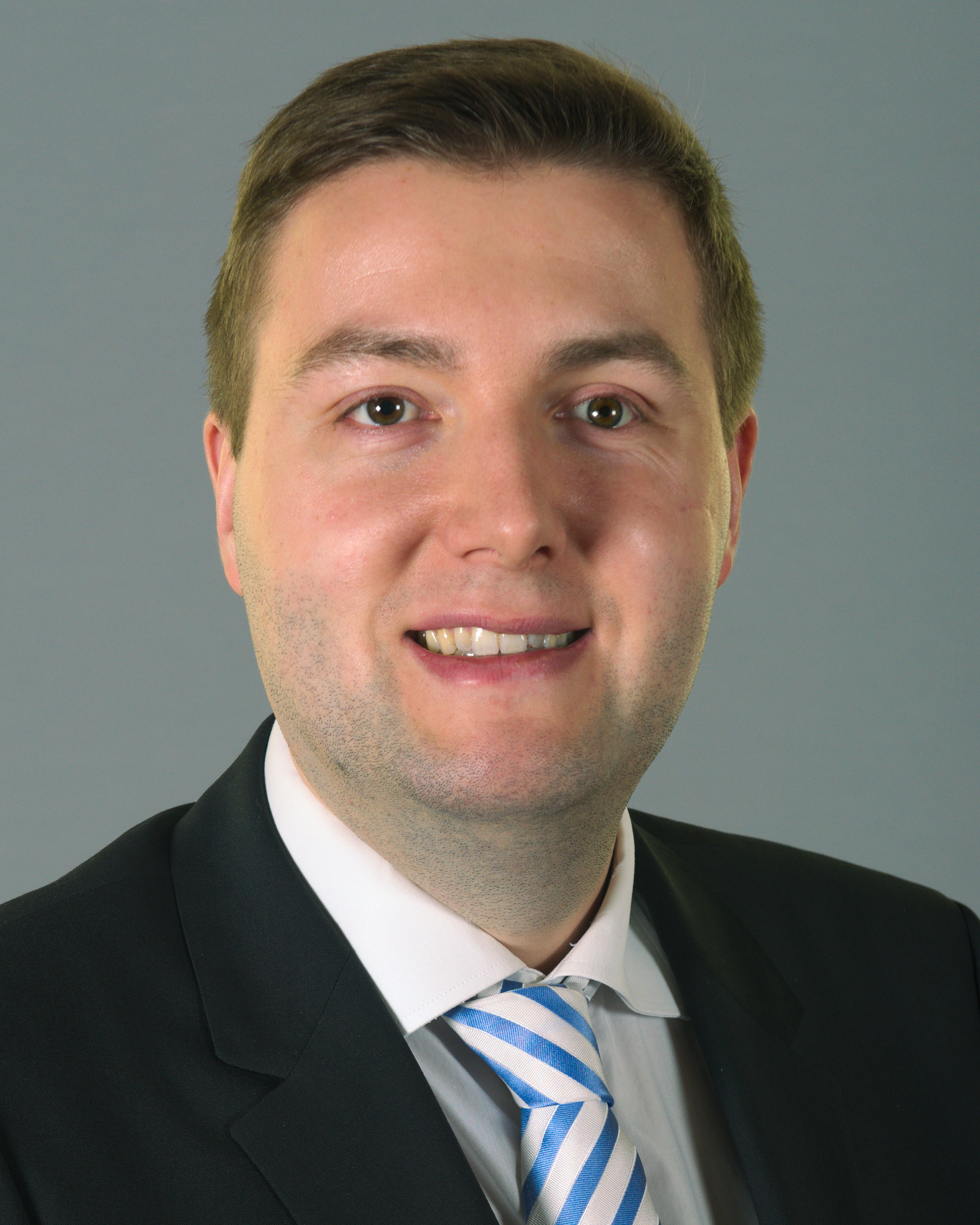

Member of the Federal Council
- In office 23 October 2015 – 6 March 2019
- Succeeded by: Michael Schilchegger

Personal details
- Born: 2 August 1987 (age 38)
- Party: Freedom Party of Austria

Michael Raml (born 2 August 1987) is an Austrian politician who was a Member of the Federal Council for the Freedom Party of Austria (FPÖ) from 2015 to 2019.
