= Raml Zayta =

Raml Zayta رمل زيتة Raml Zeita (Khirbat Qazaza)
- Village
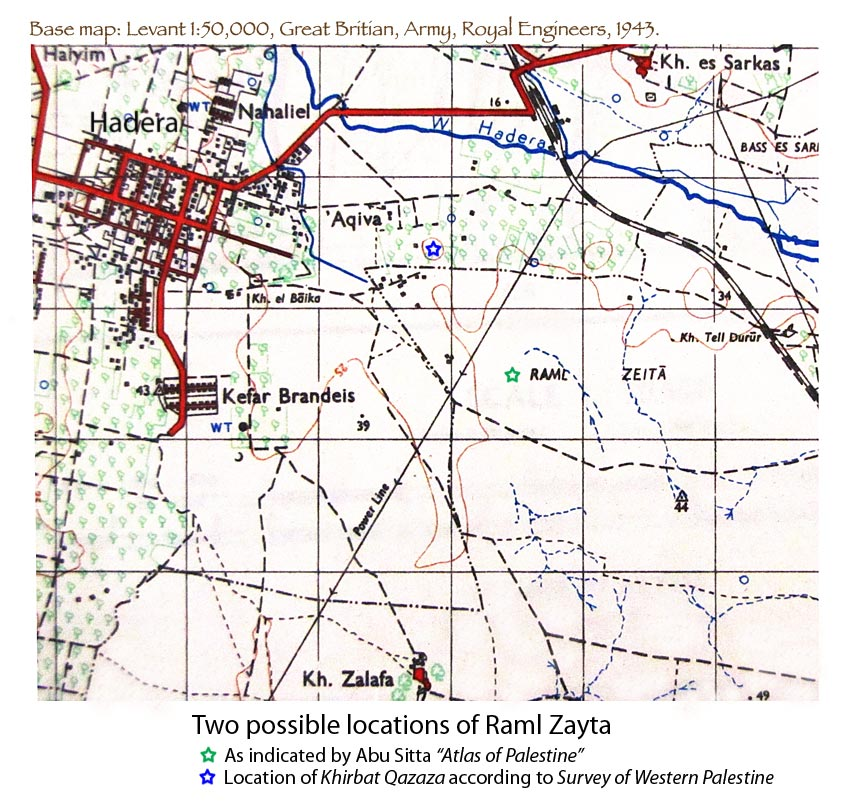

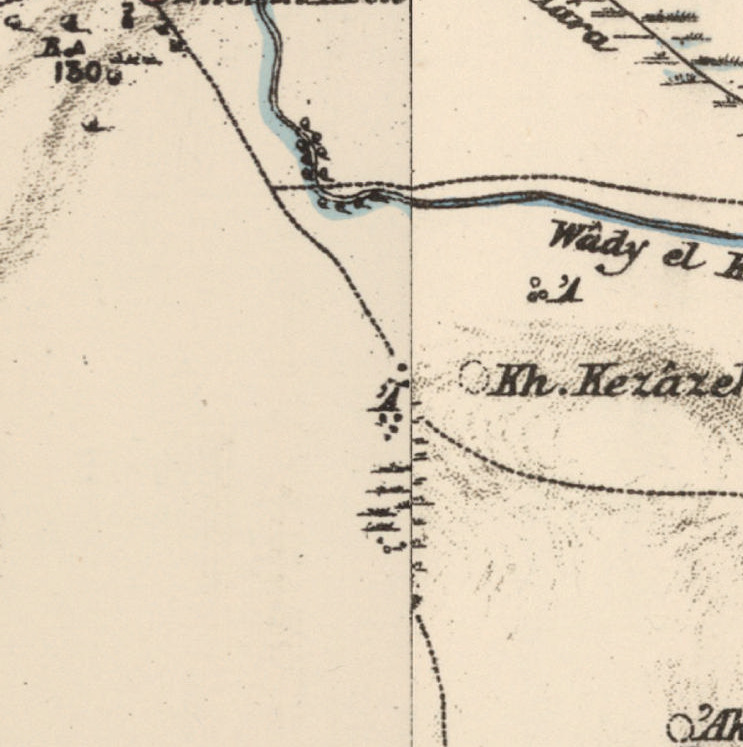
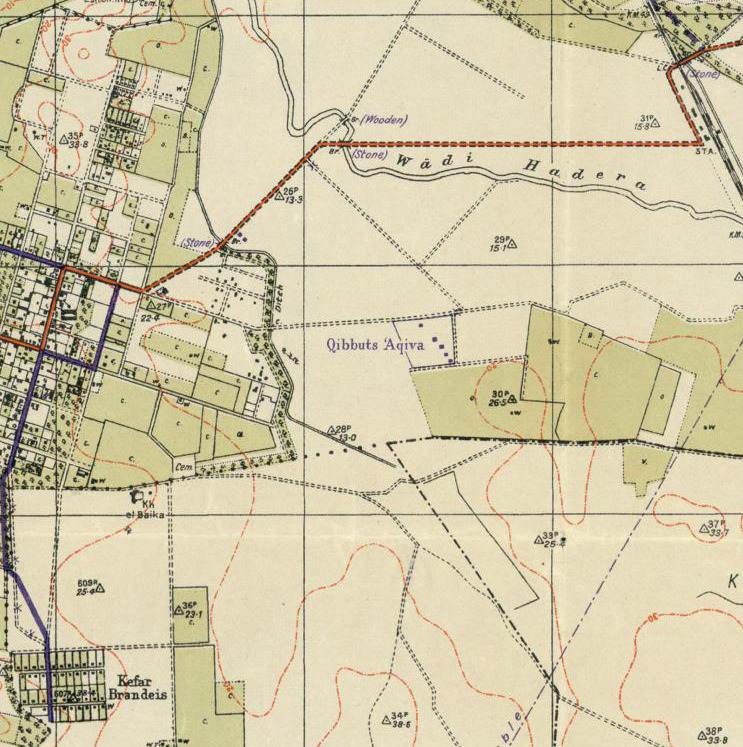
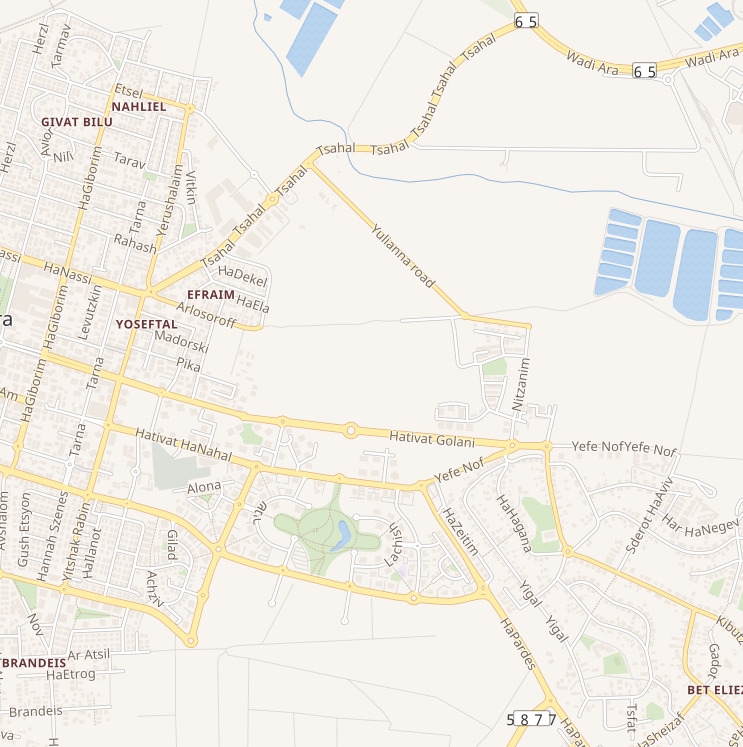
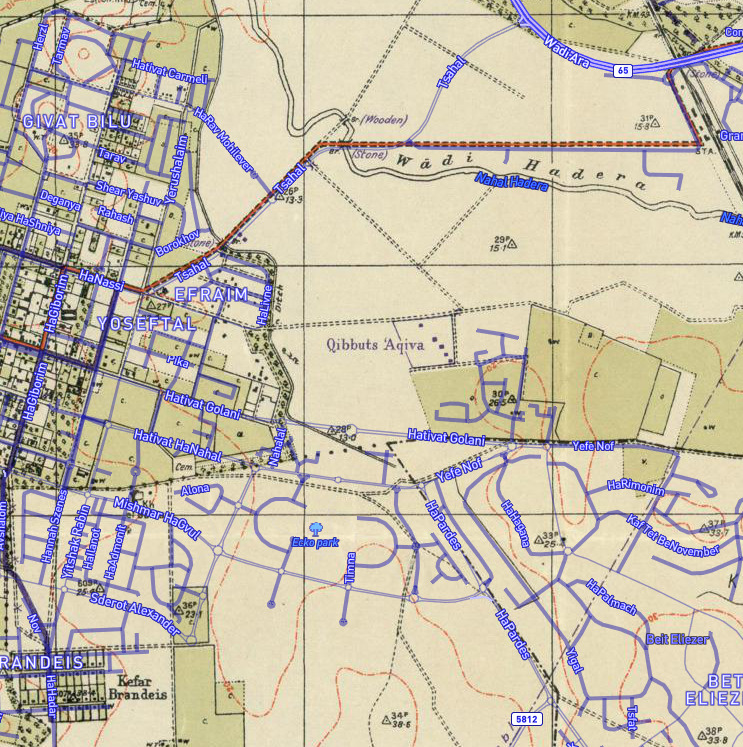
- 1870s map 1940s map modern map 1940s with modern overlay map A series of historical maps of the area around Raml Zayta (click the buttons)

- Location within Mandatory Palestine
- Coordinates: 32.42830°N 34.97128°E
- Palestine grid: 145/203
- Geopolitical entity: Mandatory Palestine
- Subdistrict: Tulkarm
- Date of depopulation: 15 March 1948

Population (1945)
  - Total: 140
- Current Localities: Sde Yitzhak, Chadera

Raml Zayta (Arabic: رمل زيتة, Raml Zeitâ), also Khirbet Qazaza, was a Palestinian Arab village located 15 km northwest of Tulkarm.

== History ==
=== British Mandate era ===
In the 1931 census of Palestine it was counted with Zeita, Tulkarm, and together they had a population 1165, all Muslim, in a total of 237 houses.

In the 1945 statistics, the village had a population of 140 Muslims, with a total of 14,837 dunams of land. The land ownership of the village before occupation in dunams:

Owner	Dunams
Arab	12,720
Jewish	1,453
Public	664
Total	14,837

Types of land use in dunams in the village in 1945:

Land Usage	Arab	Jewish	Public
Citrus and bananas	126	4	-
Irrigated and plantation	27	4	-
Cereal	12,554	1,441	111
Urban	-	-	-
Cultivable	12,707	1,449	111
Non-cultivable	13	4	553

=== 1948, and aftermath ===
According to Rosemarie Esber, the village was depopulated on 15 March 1948 during the 1948 Palestine war. Benny Morris lists it as one of the villages for which the causes and date of depopulation are unknown.

Esber, in an interview with a refugee from Raml Zaita, Zakiya Abu Hammad, writes that according to his memories, Yishuv forces had besieged the village for about two weeks, causing a lack of food: "[The Jews] started going into people's homes and forcing them out. They told us, "You either leave or we'll kill you." Some people were killed on the roads, as they abandoned their homes... They followed us. Those who were lucky, escaped with their lives, others did not." The villages were then forced out of their town and the surrounding villagers.

According to Walid Khalidi writing in 1992, an Arab family is still living in the village in one of the original houses.

== Bibliography ==
- Department of Statistics (1945). Village Statistics, April, 1945. Government of Palestine.
- Esber, R.M. (2008). Under the Cover of War, The Zionist Expulsions of the Palestinians. Arabicus Books & Media. ISBN 978-0-9815131-7-1.
- Hadawi, S. (1970). Village Statistics of 1945: A Classification of Land and Area ownership in Palestine. Palestine Liberation Organization Research Center.
- Khalidi, W. (1992). All That Remains: The Palestinian Villages Occupied and Depopulated by Israel in 1948. Washington D.C.: Institute for Palestine Studies. ISBN 0-88728-224-5.
- Mills, E., ed. (1932). Census of Palestine 1931. Population of Villages, Towns and Administrative Areas. Jerusalem: Government of Palestine.
- Morris, B. (2004). The Birth of the Palestinian Refugee Problem Revisited. Cambridge University Press. ISBN 978-0-521-00967-6.
