= Lehavot Haviva =

Lehavot Haviva: לְהֲבוֹת חֲבִיבָה (Hebrew)
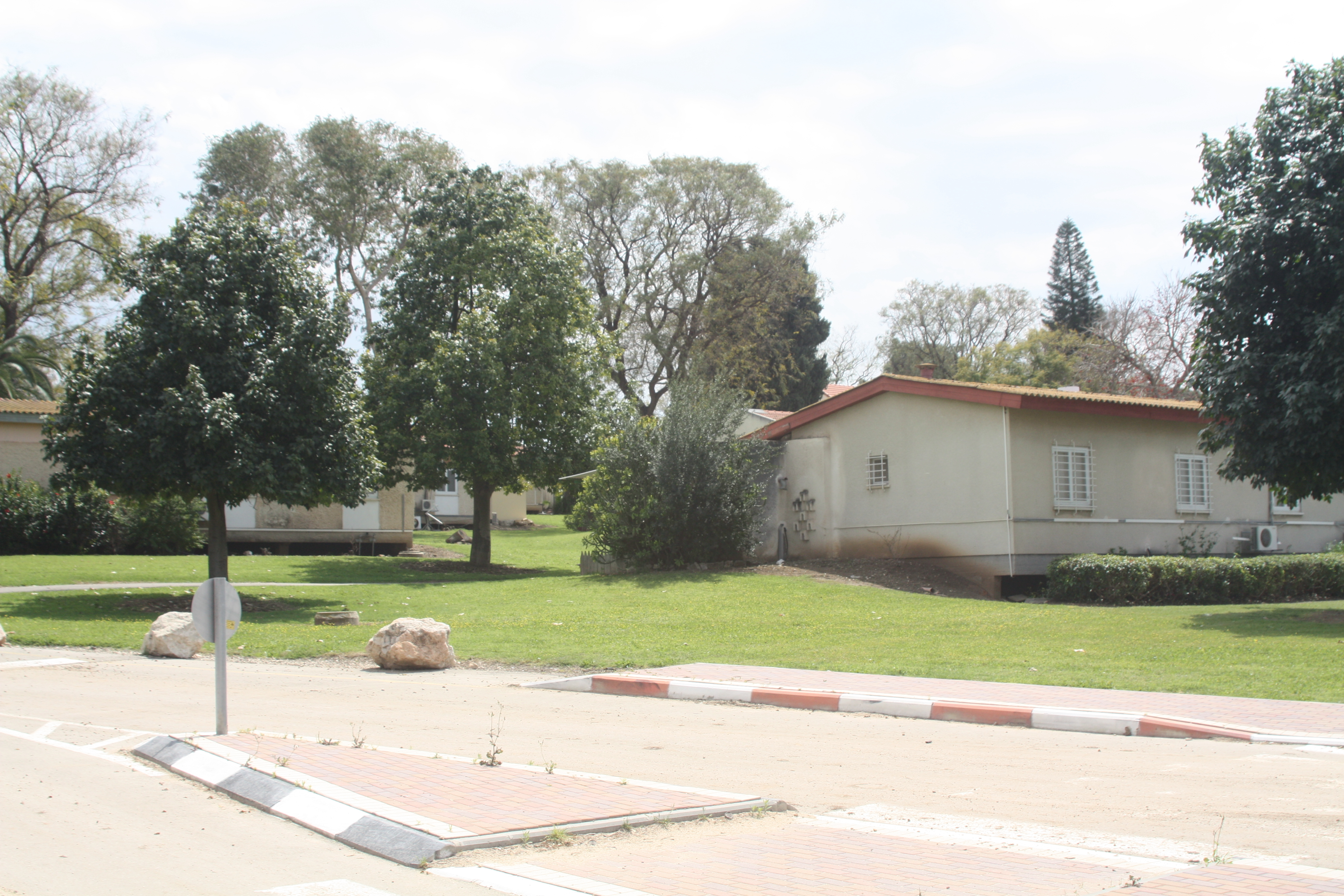
- Etymology: Haviva's Flames
- Location within Haifa region of Israel
- Coordinates: 32°23′37″N 35°0′36″E
- Country: Israel
- District: Haifa
- Subdistrict: Hadera
- Council: Menashe
- Affiliation: Kibbutz Movement
- Founded: 20 October 1949
- Founder: Czechoslovak Hashomer Hatzair members
- Population (2024): 1,003
- Website: lehavot-haviva.org.il

Lehavot Haviva (Hebrew: לְהֲבוֹת חֲבִיבָה, lit. 'Haviva's Flames') is a kibbutz in northern Israel. Located in the eastern Sharon plain near the Green Line, it falls under the jurisdiction of Menashe Regional Council. In 2024 it had a population of 1,003.

== History ==
The kibbutz was established on 20 October 1949 by members of Hashomer Hatzair who had immigrated from Czechoslovakia. It was named for Haviva Reik. In 1951 it moved three kilometres east to its present location onto the former village lands of the depopulated Palestinian Arab village of al-Jalama. Sde Yitzhak was founded on the former site of Lehavot Haviva the following year.
