= Ahituv =

Mosav in central Israel

Ahituv: אֲחִיטוּב (Hebrew)
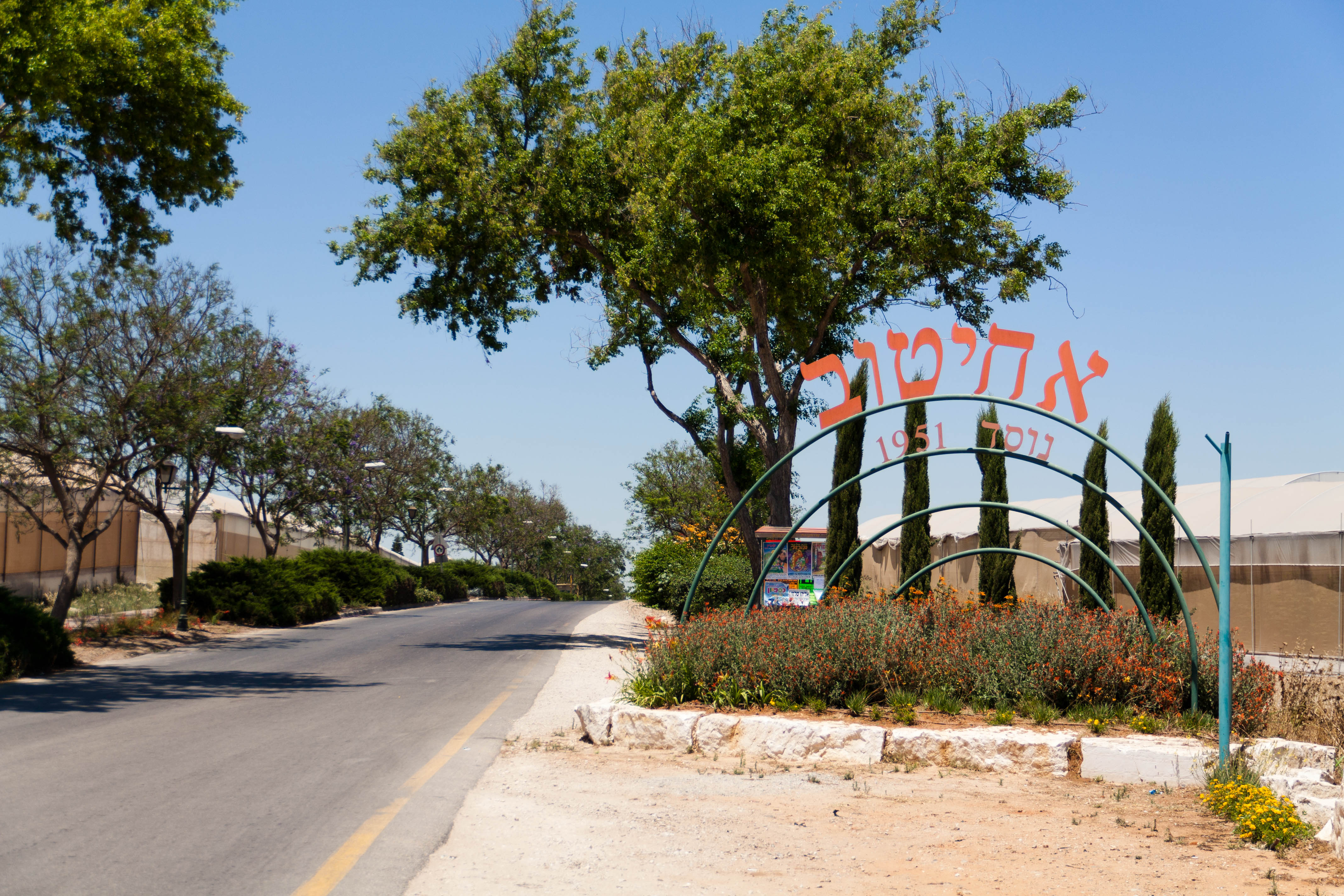
- Moshav entrance

- Location within Central Israel
- Coordinates: 32°23′23″N 34°59′21″E
- Country: Israel
- District: Central
- Subdistrict: HaSharon
- Council: Hefer Valley
- Affiliation: Moshavim Movement
- Founded: 1951
- Founder: Iranian and Iraqi Jews
- Population (2024): 1,782

Ahituv (Hebrew: אֲחִיטוּב) is a moshav in central Israel. Located near Hadera, it falls under the jurisdiction of Hefer Valley Regional Council. In 2024 it had a population of 1,782.

== History ==
The moshav was founded in 1951 by immigrants from Iran and Iraq. Its name was taken from Ahituv ben Pinchas, son of Eli mentioned in 1 Samuel 14:3;

and Ahijah, the son of Ahitub, Ichabod's brother, the son of Phinehas, the son of Eli, the priest of the LORD in Shiloh, wearing an ephod. And the people knew not that Jonathan was gone.

as well as Ahitub the father of Zadok who anointed Solomon as king.

mentioned in 2 Samuel 8:17; and in 1 Kings 1:39;

and Zadok the son of Ahitub, and Ahimelech the son of Abiathar, were priests; and Seraiah was scribe;

And Zadok the priest took the horn of oil out of the Tent, and anointed Solomon. And they blew the ram's horn; and all the people said: 'Long live king Solomon.'
