= Sde Yitzhak =

Moshav in northern Israel

Sde Yitzhak: שְׂדֵה יִצְחָק (Hebrew)
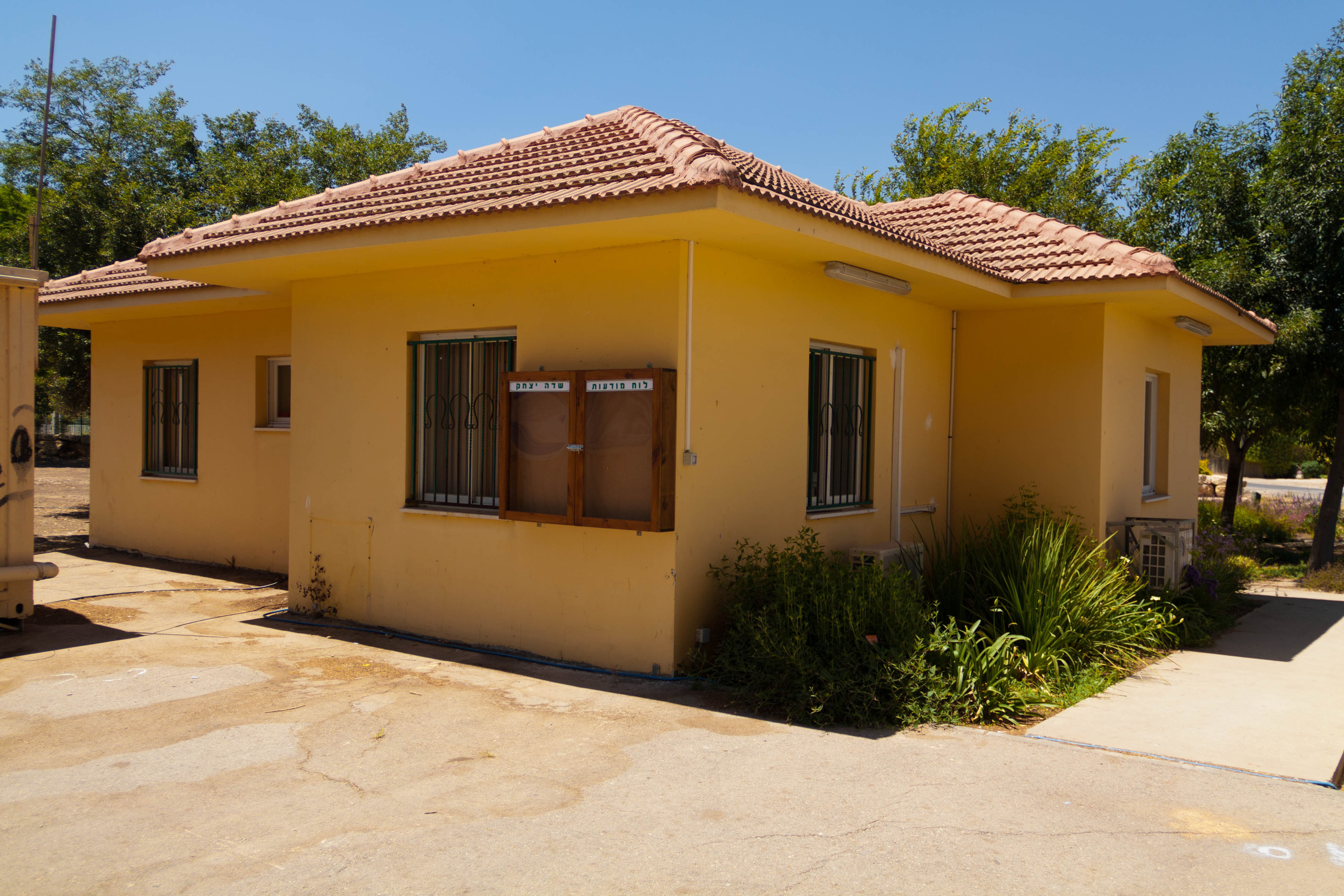
- Village council building

- Location within Haifa region of Israel
- Coordinates: 32°24′14″N 34°59′40″E
- Country: Israel
- District: Haifa
- Subdistrict: Hadera
- Council: Menashe
- Affiliation: Moshavim Movement
- Founded: 1952
- Founder: Polish Jews
- Population (2024): 772
- Website: www.sde-yizhak.com

Sde Yitzhak (Hebrew: שְׂדֵה יִצְחָק, lit. 'Field of Isaac') is a moshav in northern Israel. Located in the eastern Sharon plain to the south-east of Hadera, it falls under the jurisdiction of Menashe Regional Council. In 2024 it had a population of 772.

== History ==
The village was established in 1952 on the former site of Lahavot Haviva, which had moved to its present location three kilometres east the previous year. The founders were immigrants from Poland. The moshav was named after Yitzhak Sadeh, a founder of the Palmach.
