= Western Sharon Natural Region =

Coordinates: 32°19′41″N 34°51′29″E

- Natural Region
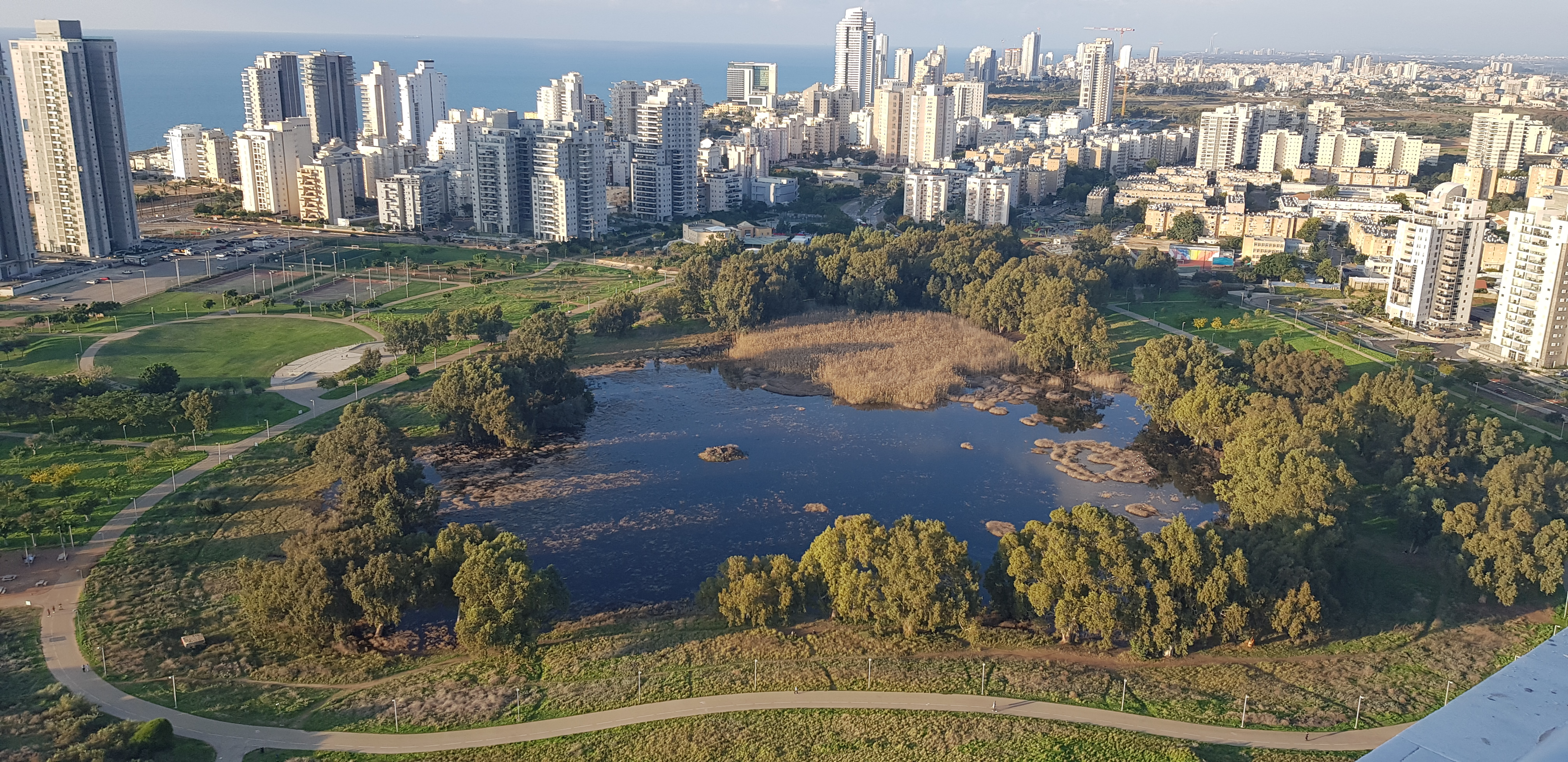
- Skyline of Netanya, the largest city in the Western Sharon Natural Region
- Interactive map of Western Sharon Natural Region
- Country: Israel
- District: Central
- Subdistrict: HaSharon
- Largest City: Netanya

Area
  - Total: 261 km^{2} (101 sq mi)

Population (2024)
  - Total: 391,559

Ethnicity
  - Jews and others: 96.8%
  - Arabs: 0.3%

The Western Sharon Natural Region is a natural region in the HaSharon Subdistrict, in the Central District of Israel. Netanya is the largest city in the natural region.

== Geography ==
Districts, Subdistricts and Natural Regions of the State of Israel, 2018

The natural region consists of the central portion of the Sharon plain, Israel's coastal plain along the Mediterranean Sea, between Ra'anana to the south and Hadera to the north. It has an area of 261 km^{2}. The largest city in the natural region is Netanya, which contains 60 percent of the natural region's population. Other major towns in the natural region include Kfar Yona, Kadima-Zoran, and Even Yehuda. The natural region contains portions of the Hefer Valley, Hof HaSharon, and Lev HaSharon regional councils.

== Demographics ==
The vast majority of the residents of the Western Sharon Natural Region are Jewish. There are no Arab towns in the natural region.

Historical population
Year	Pop.	±%
1972	110,700	—
1983	143,500	+29.6%
1995	204,800	+42.7%
2008	293,540	+43.3%
2022	376,393	+28.2%
2024	391,559	+4.0%

== Administrative local authorities ==
Cities	Local Councils	Villages
Kfar Yona; Netanya	Elyakhin; Even Yehuda; Kadima-Zoran; Pardesiya; Tel Mond	Hefer Valley: Avihayil; Bat Hen; Beit HaLevi; Beit Herut; Beit Yanai; Beit Yitzhak-Sha'ar Hefer; Bitan Aharon; Burgeta; Ein HaHoresh; Elyashiv; Geulei Teiman; Givat Haim (Ihud); Givat Haim (Meuhad); Givat Shapira; Hadar Am; Haniel; HaOgen; Havatzelet HaSharon; Herev Le'et; Hibat Tzion; Hofit; Hogla; Kfar HaRoeh; Kfar Haim; Kfar Monash; Kfar Vitkin; Kfar Yedidia; Ma'abarot; Mevo'ot Yam; Midreshet Ruppin; Mikhmoret; Mishmar HaSharon; Ne'urim; Shoshanat HaAmakim; Tzukei Yam; Hof HaSharon: Arsuf; Batzra; Beit Yehoshua; Bnei Zion; Ga'ash; Harutzim; Kiryat Shlomo; Kfar Netter; Rishpon; Shefayim; Tel Yitzhak; Udim; Yakum; Lev HaSharon: Azri'el; Bnei Dror; Ein Sarid; Ein Vered; Ganot Hadar; Geulim; Herut; Kfar Avoda; Kfar Hess; Kfar Yavetz; Mishmeret; Nordia; Porat; Tnuvot; Tzur Moshe; Yanuv; Ye'af

== Voting Patterns ==
In the 2022 election, 49 percent of voters in the natural region voted for the parties of the right-wing coalition led by Benjamin Netanyahu, while 48 percent voted for the parties of the center-left coalition led by Yair Lapid and 0.2 percent voted for the Arab parties.

In the 2026 election, 49 percent of voters in the natural region voted for the parties of the center-left coalition led by Gadi Eisenkot, while 45 percent voted for the parties of the right-wing coalition led by Benjamin Netanyahu and 0.2 percent voted for the Arab parties. An additional 3.7 percent voted for the Reservists, and 1.8 percent voted for Amcha Yisrael. Voter turnout increased 15 percent from the 2022 election.
