= Ye'af =

Ye'af: יְעָף (Hebrew)
- Location within Central Israel
- Coordinates: 32°16′11″N 34°58′5″E
- Country: Israel
- District: Central
- Subdistrict: HaSharon
- Council: Lev HaSharon
- Founded: 1990
- Population (2024): 271

Ye'af (Hebrew: יְעָף) is a community settlement in central Israel. Located in the Sharon plain near Tel Mond, it falls under the jurisdiction of Lev HaSharon Regional Council. In 2024 it had a population of 271.

== History ==
The village was founded in 1968 as an expansion for the moshavim surrounding it: Kfar Yabetz, Azri'el and Porat. Later it became an independent rural settlement.
