= Eastern Sharon Natural Region =

Coordinates: 32°16′00″N 35°00′34″E

- Natural Region
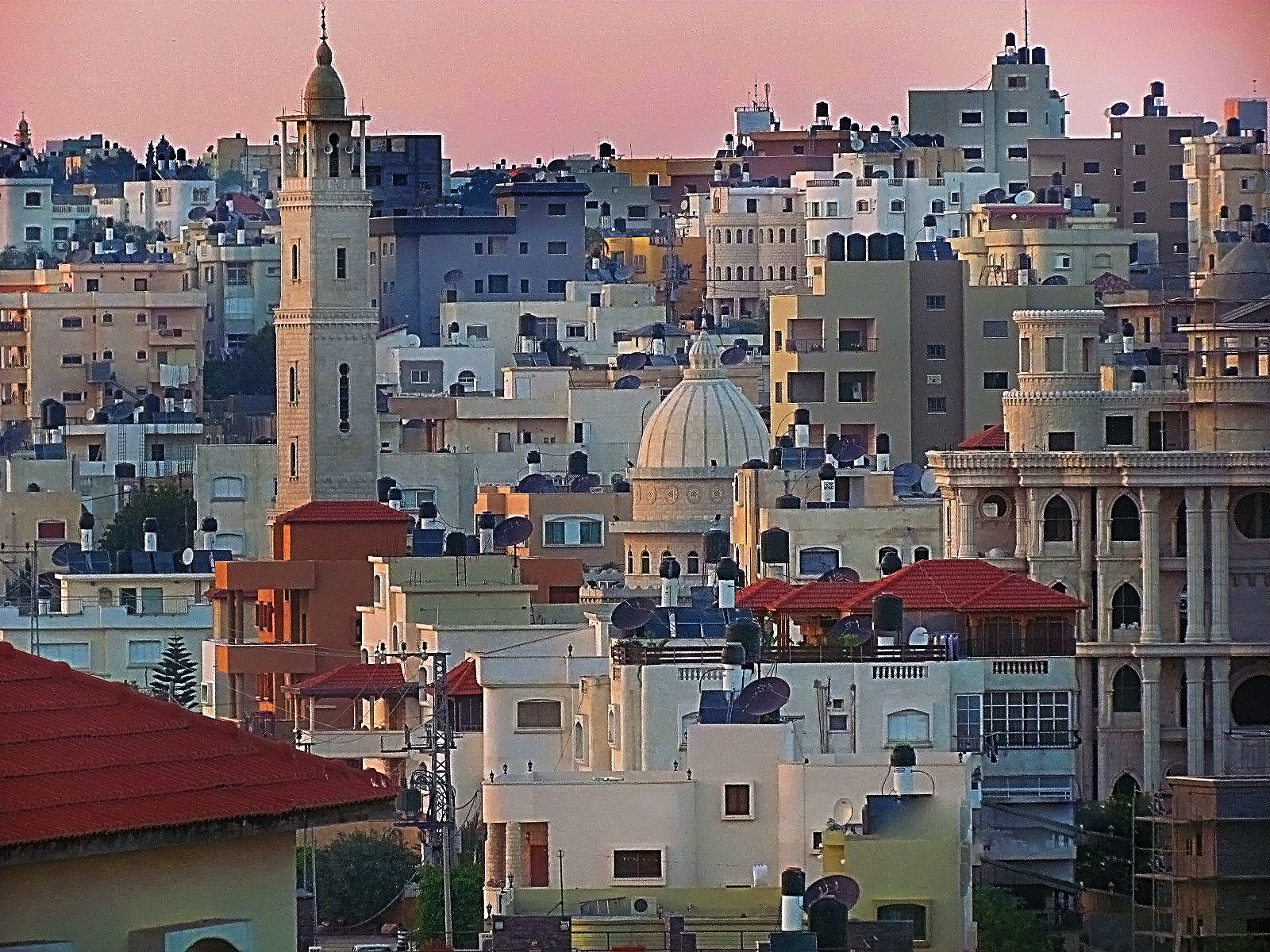
- Skyline of Tayibe, the largest city in the Eastern Sharon Natural Region
- Interactive map of Eastern Sharon Natural Region
- Country: Israel
- District: Central
- Subdistrict: HaSharon
- Largest City: Tayibe

Area
  - Total: 87 km^{2} (34 sq mi)

Population (2024)
  - Total: 124,922

Ethnicity
  - Jews and others: 12.8%
  - Arabs: 85.5%

The Eastern Sharon Natural Region is a natural region in the HaSharon Subdistrict, in the Central District of Israel. Tayibe is the largest city in the natural region.

== Geography ==
Districts, Subdistricts and Natural Regions of the State of Israel, 2018

The natural region consists of the portion of the Triangle that is coextensive with the central portion of the Sharon plain, east of Netanya and adjacent to the Green Line. It has an area of 87 km^{2}. The largest city in the natural region is Tayibe, which contains 38 percent of the natural region's population. Two other major towns in the natural region are Tira and Qalansawe. The natural region contains portions of the Hefer Valley and Lev HaSharon regional councils.

== Demographics ==
At 85 percent of the population, a large majority of the residents of the Eastern Sharon Natural Region are Arabs. This is the largest proportion of Arabs of any natural region in Israel outside the Northern District. The four most populous places - Tayibe, Tira, Qalansawe, and Zemer - are all populated by Arabs. The other 11 towns and villages in the natural region are populated by Jews, who constitute 13 percent of the population.

Historical population
Year	Pop.	±%
1972	29,400	—
1983	39,000	+32.7%
1995	59,600	+52.8%
2008	94,400	+58.4%
2022	119,813	+26.9%
2024	124,922	+4.3%

== Administrative local authorities ==
Cities	Local Councils	Villages
Qalansawe; Tayibe; Tira	Zemer	Hefer Valley: Ahituv; Bahan; Bat Hefer; Be'erotayim; Gan Yoshiya; HaMa'apil; Olesh; Ometz; Yad Hana; Lev HaSharon: Nitzanei Oz; Sha'ar Efrayim

== Voting Patterns ==
In the 2022 election, 80 percent of voters in the natural region voted for the Arab parties, while 14 percent voted for the parties of the center-left coalition led by Yair Lapid and 5 percent voted for the parties of the right-wing coalition led by Benjamin Netanyahu.

In the 2026 election, 83 percent of voters in the natural region voted for the Arab parties, while 12 percent voted for the parties of the center-left coalition led by Gadi Eisenkot and 3 percent voted for the parties of the right-wing coalition led by Benjamin Netanyahu. An additional 0.6 percent voted for the Reservists, and 0.2 percent voted for Amcha Yisrael. Voter turnout increased 46 percent from the 2022 election.
