= Kfar Hess =

Moshav in central Israel

Kfar Hess: כְּפַר הֶס (Hebrew)
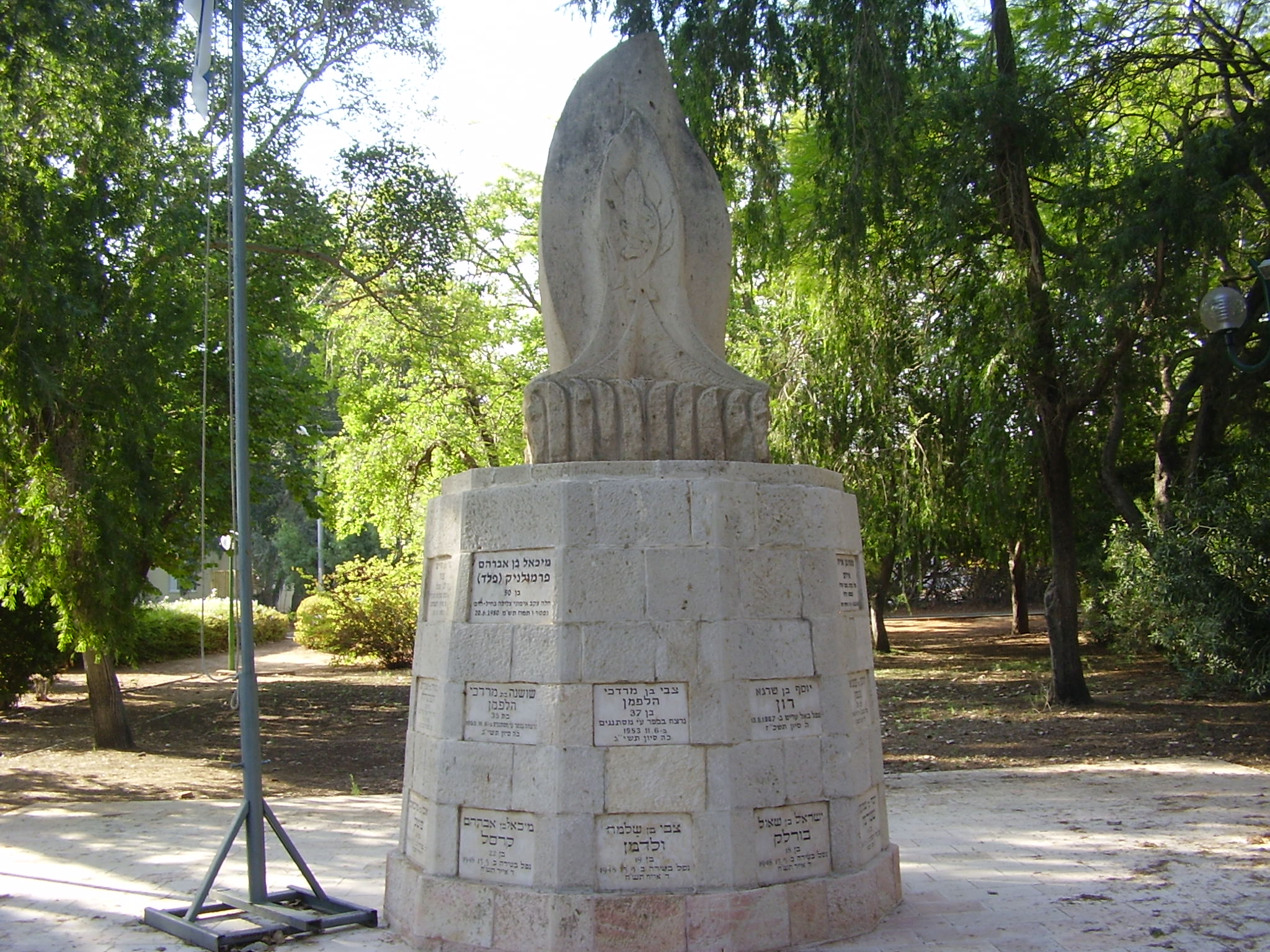

- Location within Central Israel Location within Israel
- Coordinates: 32°14′47″N 34°56′5″E
- Country: Israel
- District: Central
- Subdistrict: HaSharon
- Council: Lev HaSharon
- Affiliation: Moshavim Movement
- Founded: 1931
- Elevation: 80 m (260 ft)
- Population (2024): 1,625
- Website: www.kfar-hess.co.il

Kfar Hess (Hebrew: כְּפַר הֶס, lit. 'Hess Village') is a moshav in central Israel. Located in the Sharon plain to the south-east of Tel Mond and covering 3,800 dunams, it falls under the jurisdiction of Lev HaSharon Regional Council. In 2024 it had a population of 1,625.

== History ==
The village was founded in 1931 as part of the Settlement of the Thousand, and together with Herut, Ein Vered, Tel Mond and Kfar Ziv, it formed part of Gush Tel Mond (lit. Tel Mond Bloc). It was named after Moses Hess, a secular Jewish philosopher and one of the founders of socialism and Labour Zionist thought.

The founding group was organized under the Izrael organization, that was meant to establish a moshav on land bought from the village of Zarin in the outskirts of the Jezreel Valley, near Kfar Yehezkel. The idea for creating the new organization was conceived by the agricultural workers and Zionist pioneers, Nisan Boord and Mordechai Te'eni.

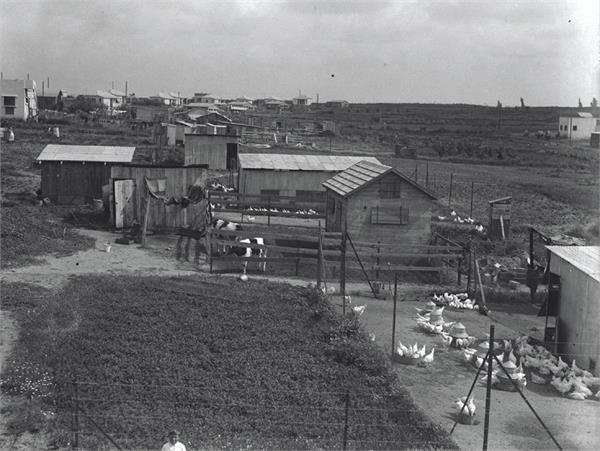
Kfar Hess in 1937

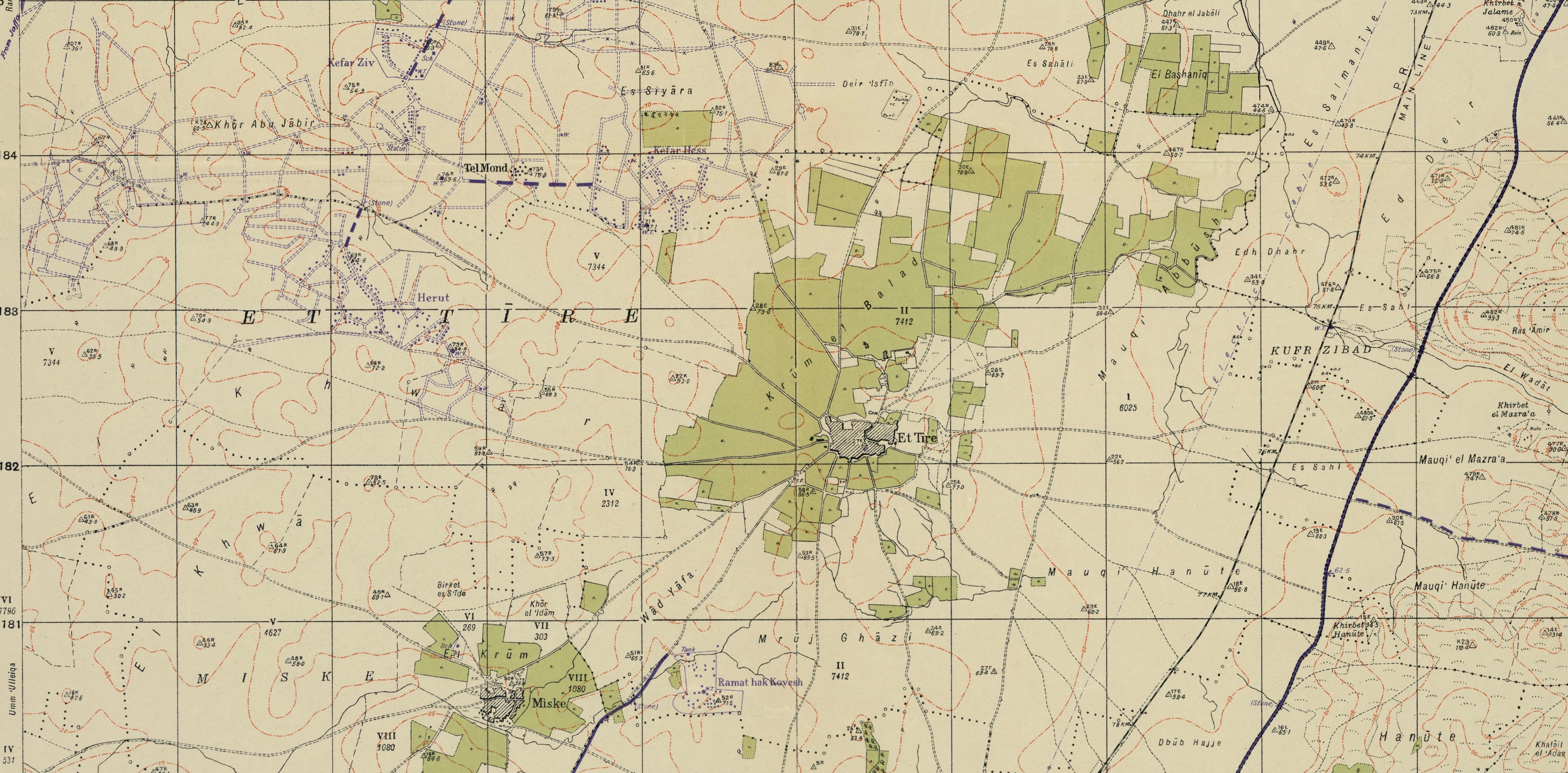
Kfar Hess (Kefar Hess) in 1942 (1:20,000)

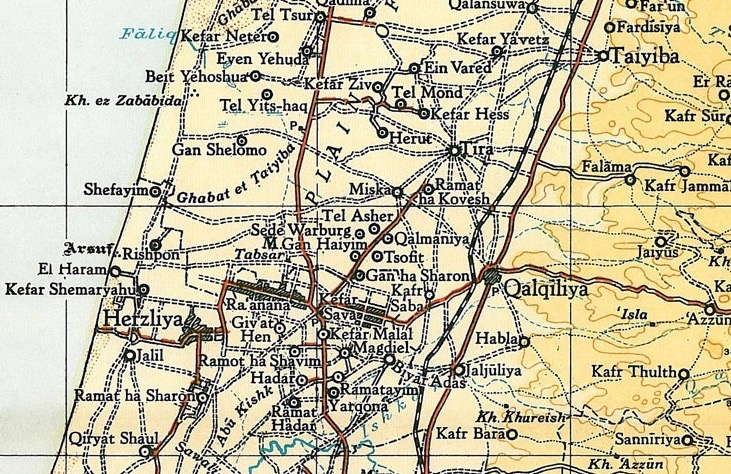
Kfar Hess (Kefar Hess) in 1945 (1:250,000)

== Notable residents ==
- Giora Eiland, retired general
- Ram Rothberg, retired admiral
