= Porat =

Porat may refer to:

- Porat (surname), a Jewish surname (not to be confused with von Porat, a Swedish noble family.)
- Porat, Israel, a moshav settlement in the Central region
- Porat, Croatia, a village on the island of Krk
- Porat, Zadar County, a village on the island of Molat
- Porat, Split-Dalmatia County, a village on the island of Biševo
