= Kfar Avoda =

Special education center in Israel

Kfar Avoda: כפר עבודה (Hebrew)
- Location within Central Israel
- Coordinates: 32°15′21″N 34°56′23″E
- Country: Israel
- District: Central
- Subdistrict: HaSharon
- Council: Lev HaSharon
- Founded: 1942
- Population (2024): 174

Kfar Avoda (Hebrew: כפר עבודה, lit. 'Work Village') is an institutional settlement that operates a center for special education in central Israel. Located in the Sharon plain around two kilometres east of Tel Mond, it falls under the jurisdiction of Lev HaSharon Regional Council. In 2024 it had a population of 174.

== History ==
Before the 20th century the area formed part of the Forest of Sharon. It was an open woodland dominated by Mount Tabor Oak, which extended from Kfar Yona in the north to Ra'anana in the south. The local Arab inhabitants traditionally used the area for pasture, firewood and intermittent cultivation. The intensification of settlement and agriculture in the coastal plain during the 19th century led to deforestation and subsequent environmental degradation.

The village was founded in 1942 and is run by the Welfare and Social Services Ministry.
