= Bnei =

Bnei may refer to:

== Places ==
- Bnei Atarot, moshav in Central District
- Bnei Atzmon, Israeli settlement
- Bnei Ayish, town in Central District
- Bnei Brak, city in Tel Aviv District
- Bnei Darom, moshav in Central District
- Bnei Dror, moshav in Central District
- Bnei Re'em, moshav in Central District
- Bnei Shimon Regional Council, regional council in the northern Negev
- Bnei Zion, moshav in Central District

== Sport ==
- Bnei al-Salam Rahat F.C., football club
- F.C. Bnei Arraba, football club
- Bnei Herzliya, basketball club
- F.C. Bnei M.M.B.E. HaGolan VeHaGalil, football club
- Bnei Sakhnin F.C., football club

== Other uses ==
- Bnei Akiva, Zionist youth movement
- Bnei Menashe, Jewish ethnic group
- Bandai Namco Entertainment, video game publisher

== See also ==
- Bene Israel (India)
