= Sarid (disambiguation) =

Sarid can refer to:

- Sarid, a land allotted to the tribe of Zebulun (Joshua 19:10), and later a Biblical city
- Sarid, a kibbutz in the Jezreel Valley, established in 1926
- Yishai Sarid (1965–), Israeli attorney and author
- Yossi Sarid (1940–2015), left-wing Israeli news commentator and former Minister of Education of Israel
- Ein Sarid, a village in central Israel
