= Ganot Hadar =

Community settlement in central Israel

Ganot Hadar: גַּנּוֹת הָדָר (Hebrew)
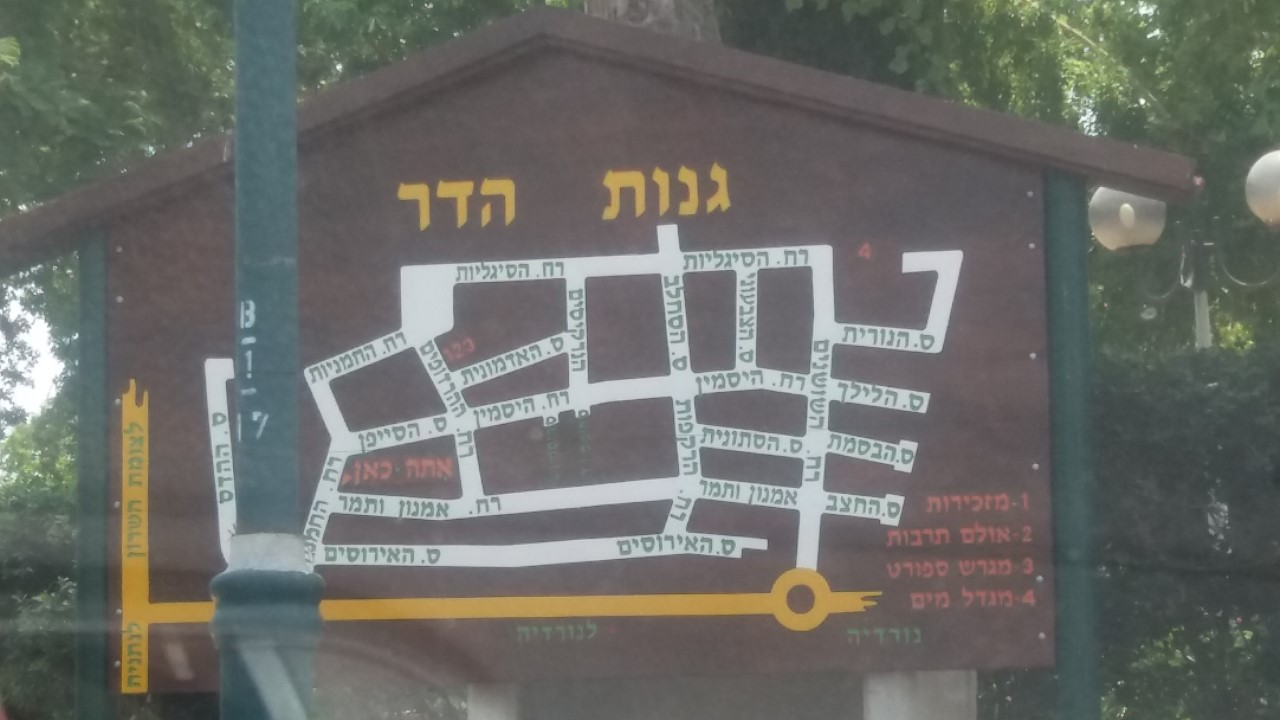
- Map of the settlement

- Location within Central Israel
- Coordinates: 32°19′12″N 34°54′1″E
- Country: Israel
- District: Central
- Subdistrict: HaSharon
- Council: Lev HaSharon
- Founded: 1954
- Founder: South African immigrants
- Population (2024): 954

Ganot Hadar (Hebrew: גַּנּוֹת הָדָר, lit. 'Citrus Gardens') is a community settlement in central Israel. Located in the Sharon plain, it falls under the jurisdiction of Lev HaSharon Regional Council. In 2024 it had a population of 954.

== History ==
The village was founded in 1954 and was designated for immigrants from South Africa. Its name was derived from the surrounding groves.
