= Nitzanei Oz =

Moshav in central Israel

Nitzanei Oz: נִצָּנֵי עֹז (Hebrew)
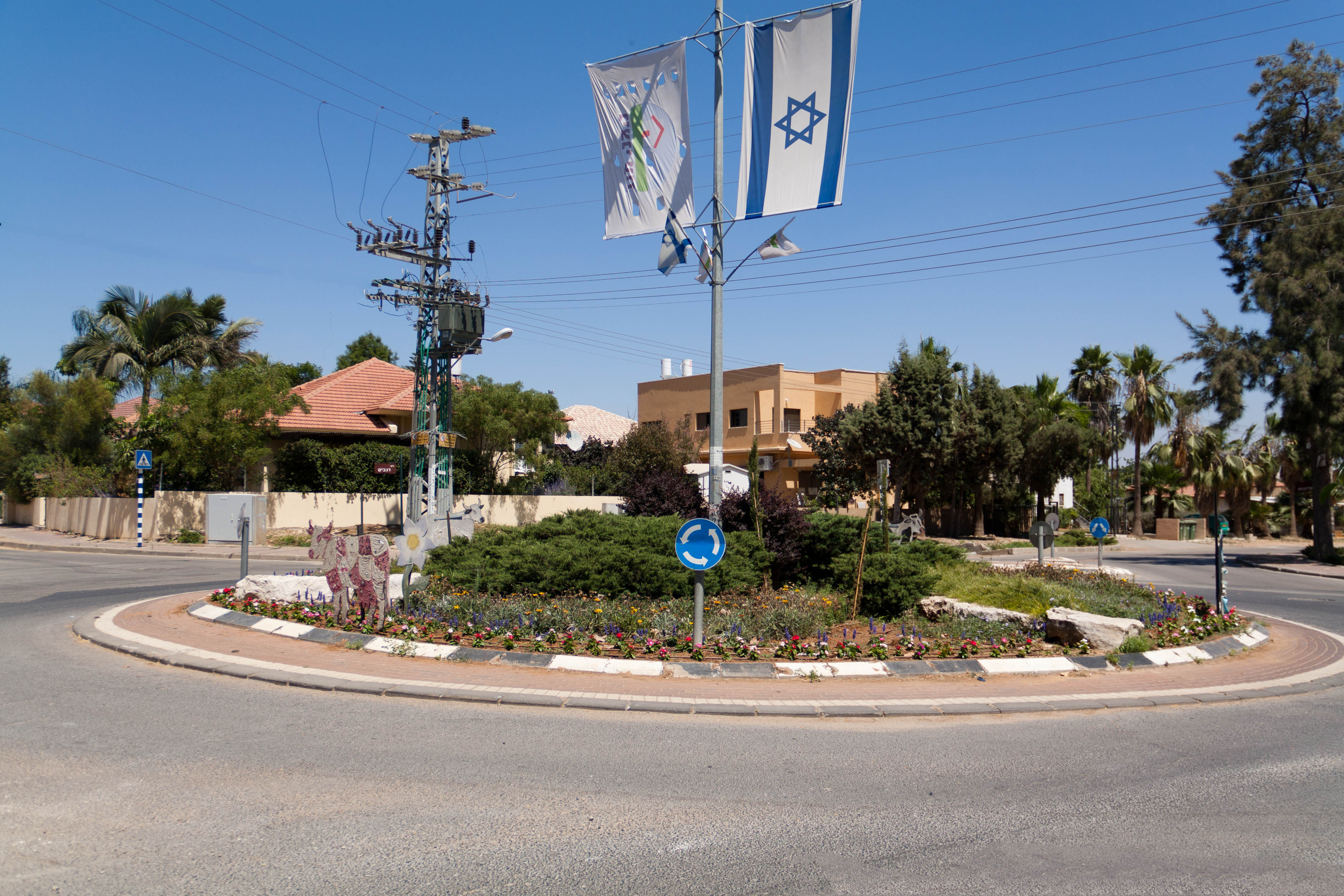

- Location within Central Israel
- Coordinates: 32°18′24″N 35°0′18″E
- Country: Israel
- District: Central
- Subdistrict: HaSharon
- Council: Lev HaSharon
- Affiliation: Moshavim Movement
- Founded: 1951
- Founder: Nahal
- Population (2024): 1,288

Nitzanei Oz (Hebrew: נִצָּנֵי עֹז, ניצני עוז, lit. Buds of Strength) is a moshav in central Israel. Located in the Sharon plain near the Green Line and Tulkarm, it falls under the jurisdiction of Lev HaSharon Regional Council. In 2024 it had a population of 1,288.

== History ==
It was founded in 1951 as a Nahal settlement, before being converted to a civilian moshav in 1958. Due to its proximity to the border with Jordan, it was affected by attacks and infiltrations by Palestinian fedayeen until the Six-Day War in 1967.
