= Azri'el =

Moshav in central Israel

Azri'el: עַזְרִיאֵל (Hebrew)
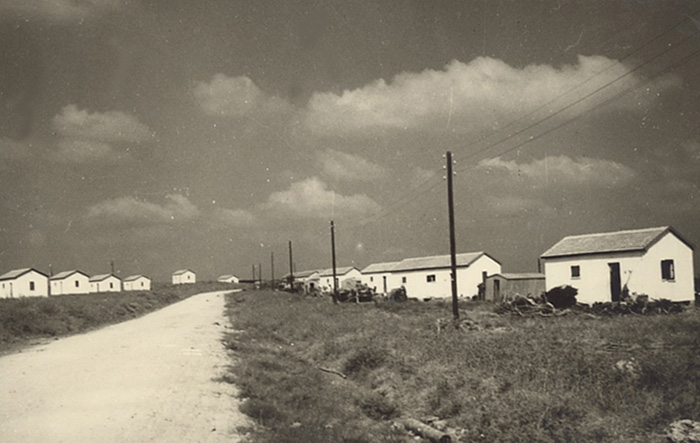

- Location within Central Israel Location within Israel
- Coordinates: 32°15′44″N 34°58′16″E
- Country: Israel
- District: Central
- Subdistrict: HaSharon
- Council: Lev HaSharon
- Affiliation: Hapoel HaMizrachi
- Founded: 1951
- Founder: Yemenite Jews
- Population (2024): 1,044
- Website: www.myazriel.com

Azri'el (Hebrew: עַזְרִיאֵל) is a religious moshav in central Israel. Located near Tel Mond, it falls under the jurisdiction of Lev HaSharon Regional Council. In 2024 it had a population of 1,044.

== History ==
Azriel was founded in 1951 by immigrants from Yemen. It was named after Azriel Hildesheimer, a founder of Modern Orthodox Judaism.

In 2006 the moshav approved an expansion plan to bring in new families. Twenty families moved in by the summer of 2008.
