= Ella Waweya =

Israeli military officer

- إيلا واوية
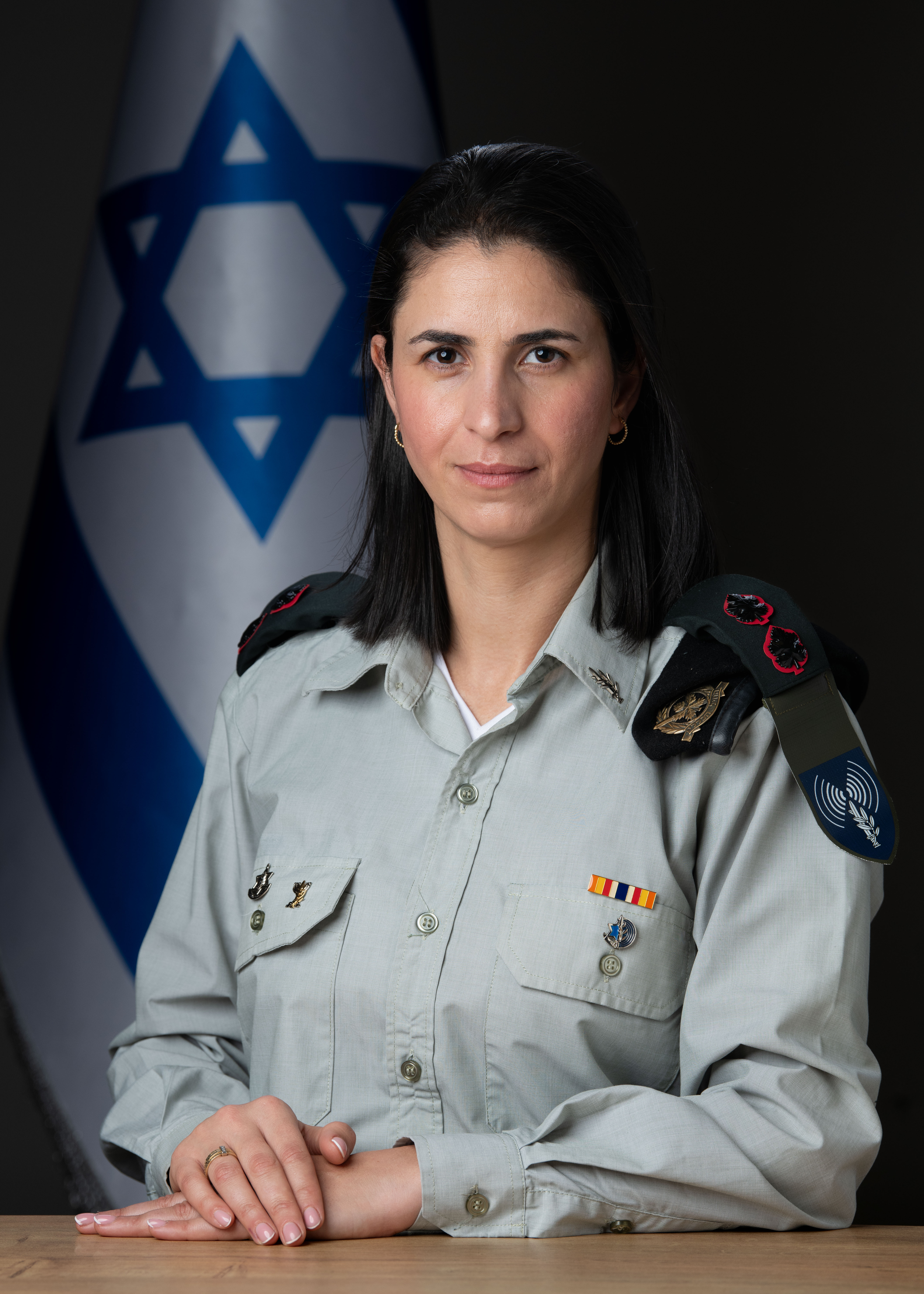
- Born: 16 October 1989 (age 36); Qalansawe, Israel
- Military career
- Allegiance: Israel
- Rank: lieutenant colonel
- Unit: IDF Spokesperson's Unit
- Commands: Head of the Arab Media Division of the IDF Spokesperson's Unit

Ella Waweya (Hebrew: אלה ואויה, Arabic: إيلا واوية; born 16 October 1989), known widely as "Captain Ella" (Hebrew: קפטן אלה, Arabic: كابتن إيلا), is an Israel Defense Forces (IDF) officer who holds the rank of lieutenant colonel. She is the highest-ranking Muslim in the IDF and is currently serving as the Spokesperson for the IDF's Arabic media, heading the Arabic communications department.

== Biography ==
Ella was born in Qalansawe, Israel, to a Muslim family. She completed her high school education at Atid School in her hometown, earned a BA with honors in Communications from Netanya Academic College, and an MA with honors in Government and Political Marketing from the Interdisciplinary Center Herzliya.

Before joining the IDF, she worked in communications, including radio broadcasting, and founded the “Shared Life” project to promote Arab–Jewish coexistence. After national service at Meir Hospital in Kfar Saba in 2011, she volunteered for the Israel Defense Forces in 2013, becoming the first female soldier from the Triangle area, initially keeping her service private from her family. However, her mother and siblings soon became proud of Waweya's service.

In February 2026, Ella was selected to succeed Avichay Adraee, who lately retired from Spokesperson for the IDF's Arabic media. On 15 February, she was officially appointed as the IDF's Arabic media spokesperson during a handover ceremony in Tel Aviv.

== Social media ==
Under the moniker "Captain Ella", Waweya posts Arabic-language content on social media. According to The Times of Israel, she has more than half a million followers on TikTok and 200,000 on X.
