= Sha'ar Efraim =

Moshav in central Israel

Sha'ar Efraim: שַׁעַר אֶפְרַיִם (Hebrew)
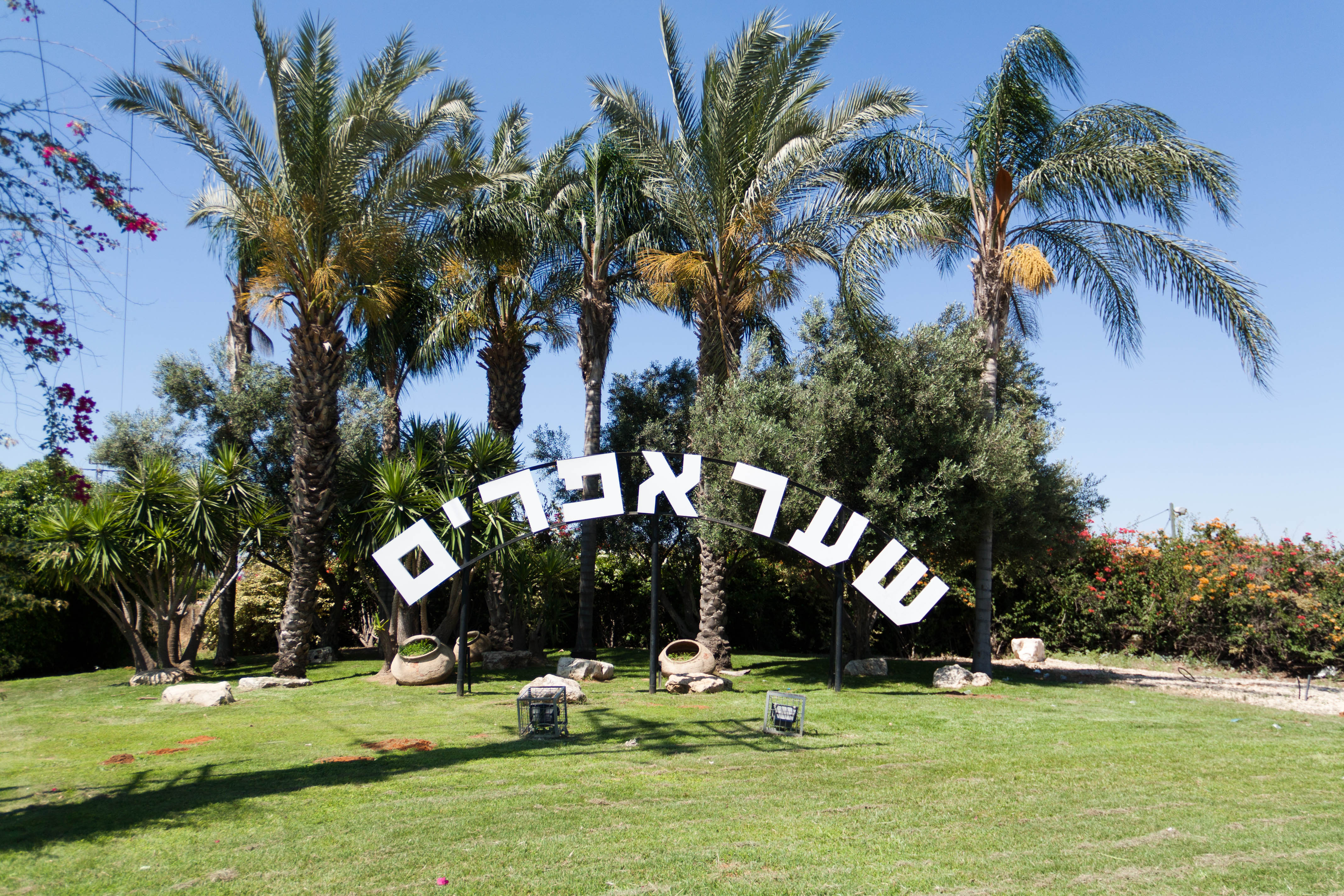

- Location within Central Israel
- Coordinates: 32°17′19″N 34°59′53″E
- Country: Israel
- District: Central
- Subdistrict: HaSharon
- Council: Lev HaSharon
- Affiliation: Moshavim Movement
- Founded: 1953
- Population (2024): 2,020

Sha'ar Efraim (Hebrew: שַׁעַר אֶפְרַיִם, lit. 'Efraim Gate') is a moshav in central Israel. Located in the Sharon plain, it falls under the jurisdiction of Lev HaSharon Regional Council. In 2024 it had a population of 2,020.

== History ==
The village was founded in 1953, and derived its name from the fact that the area was the home of the Tribe of Ephraim.
