= Porat, Israel =

Moshav in central Israel

Porat: פּוֹרָת (Hebrew)
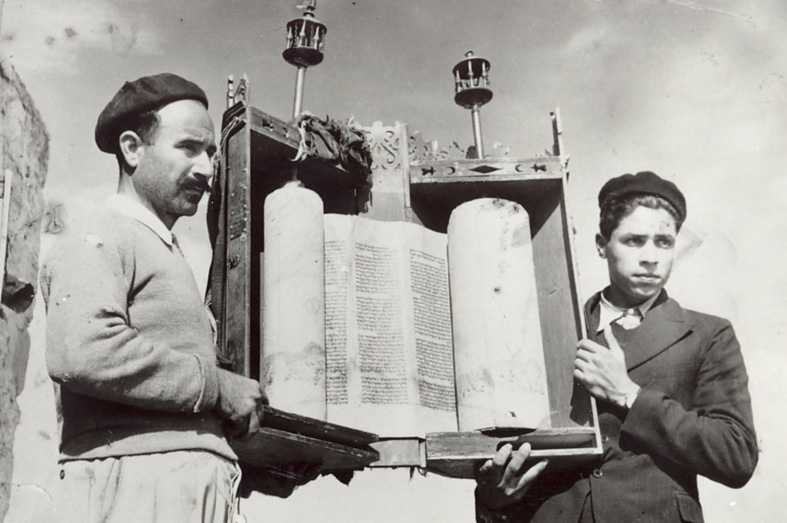
- Torah scroll of the village synagogue in the 1950s

- Location within Central Israel
- Coordinates: 32°16′40″N 34°56′56″E
- Country: Israel
- District: Central
- Subdistrict: HaSharon
- Council: Lev HaSharon
- Affiliation: Hapoel HaMizrachi
- Founded: 1950
- Population (2024): 1,586

Porat (Hebrew: פּוֹרָת, lit. 'Fruitful vine') is a mixed (religious and non-religious) moshav in central Israel. Located in the Sharon plain between Ein Vered and Kfar Yabetz, it falls under the jurisdiction of Lev HaSharon Regional Council. In 2024 it had a population of 1,586.

== History ==
Before the 20th century the area formed part of the Forest of Sharon. It was an open woodland dominated by Mount Tabor Oak, which extended from Kfar Yona in the north to Ra'anana in the south. The local inhabitants traditionally used the area for pasture, firewood and intermittent cultivation. The intensification of settlement and agriculture in the coastal plain during the 19th century, under the Ottoman Empire, led to deforestation and subsequent environmental degradation.

The village was founded in 1950 on land to the west of the Arab village of Qalansawe. Its name is taken from the Book of Genesis 49:22;

Joseph is a fruitful vine, a fruitful vine by a fountain; its branches run over the wall.
