= Lev HaSharon Regional Council =

Coordinates: 32°18′N 34°57′E

Lev HaSharon לב השרון ليف هشارون
- Regional council (from 1984)
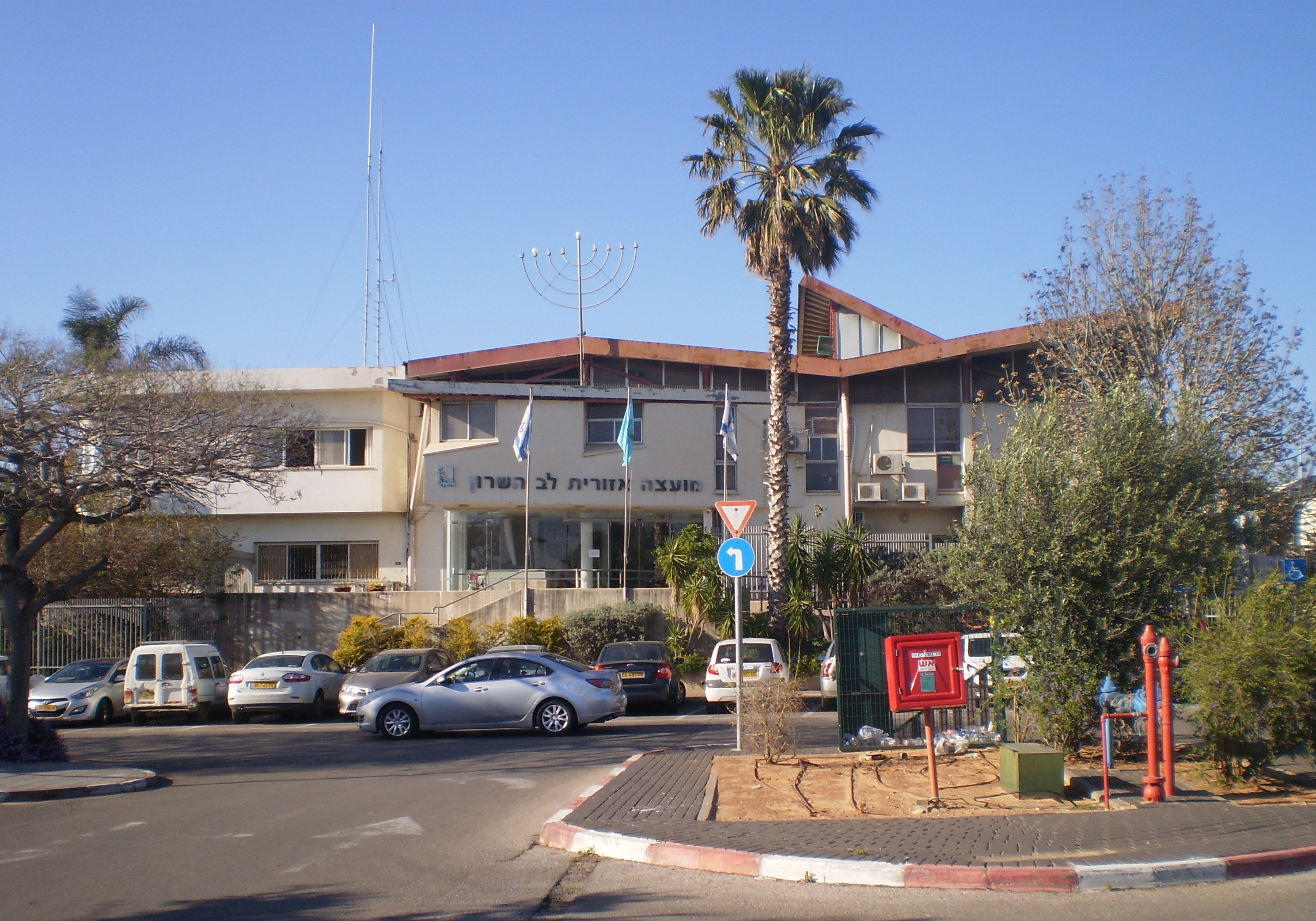
- Interactive map of Lev HaSharon
- Country: Israel
- District: Central
- Subdistrict: HaSharon
- Natural region: Eastern Sharon, Western Sharon

Government
  - Head of Regional Council: Eli Aton

Area
  - Total: 56,720 dunams (56.72 km^{2}; 21.90 sq mi)

Population (2024)
  - Total: 24,251
  - Density: 427.6/km^{2} (1,107/sq mi)
- Website: www.lev-hasharon.com

Lev HaSharon Regional Council (Hebrew: מועצה אזורית לב השרון, romanized: Mo'atza Azorit Lev HaSharon, lit. 'Heart of the Sharon Region') is a regional council in the Sharon region of the Central District of Israel.

== History ==
The council was established in 1984, unifying Hadar HaSharon and Northern Sharon regional councils, and covers 18 villages with a total area of 57,000 dunams and a population of 24,251. It borders Hefer Valley Regional Council and Pardesiya to the north, Qalansawe, Tira and the West Bank to the east, Drom HaSharon Regional Council to the south and Even Yehuda and Netanya to the west. Until 1997 it also covered Tzoran, now part of Kadima-Zoran.

== List of communities ==
- Moshavim
  - Azri'el · Bnei Dror · Ein Sarid · Ein Vered · Geulim · Herut · Kfar Hess · Kfar Yabetz · Mishmeret · Nitzanei Oz · Nordia · Porat · Sha'ar Efraim · Tnuvot · Tzur Moshe · Yanuv
- Community settlements
  - Ganot Hadar · Ye'af
- Other villages
  - Kfar Avoda

== Demographics ==
Historical population
Year	Pop.	±%
1972	7,100	—
1983	6,700	−5.6%
1995	9,300	+38.8%
2008	19,620	+111.0%
2022	24,017	+22.4%
2024	24,251	+1.0%

== Voting Patterns ==
In the 2022 election, 64 percent of voters in the regional council voted for the parties of the center-left coalition led by Yair Lapid, while 36 percent voted for the parties of the right-wing coalition led by Benjamin Netanyahu and 0.3 percent voted for the Arab parties.

In the 2026 election, 64 percent of voters in the regional council voted for the parties of the center-left coalition led by Gadi Eisenkot, while 30 percent voted for the parties of the right-wing coalition led by Benjamin Netanyahu and 0.3 percent voted for the Arab parties. An additional 4 percent voted for the Reservists, and 1.6 percent voted for Amcha Yisrael. Voter turnout increased 17 percent from the 2022 election.

== International relations ==
=== Twin towns — Sister cities ===
Lev HaSharon region is twinned with:

- (Poland) Tczew (since 1997)
- (Germany) Witten (since 1979)
