= Geulim =

Moshav in central Israel

Geulim: גְּאֻלִים, גאולים (Hebrew)
- Location within Central Israel Location within Israel
- Coordinates: 32°17′55″N 34°56′42″E
- Country: Israel
- District: Central
- Subdistrict: HaSharon
- Council: Lev HaSharon
- Affiliation: Moshavim Movement
- Founded: 17 November 1938
- Founder: German Jewish refugees
- Population (2024): 958

Geulim (Hebrew: גְּאֻלִים, lit. 'Redeemed') is a moshav in central Israel. Located in the Sharon plain near Netanya, it falls under the jurisdiction of Lev HaSharon Regional Council. In 2024 it had a population of 958.

== History ==
Before the 20th century the area formed part of the Forest of Sharon. It was an open woodland dominated by Mount Tabor Oak, which extended from Kfar Yona in the north to Ra'anana in the south. The local Arab inhabitants traditionally used the area for pasture, firewood and intermittent cultivation. The intensification of settlement and agriculture in the coastal plain during the 19th century led to deforestation and subsequent environmental degradation.

Geulim was founded on 17 November 1938 as a tower and stockade settlement by Jewish refugees from Nazi Germany, and was initially named "Bnei Geulim" (lit. Sons of the Redeemed).

In 1945 the residents moved to Kfar Yedidia, and members of the Talmon organisation of Yemenite immigrants settled in the area. They changed the name to Talmon-Geulim, and later to just Geulim.

During 1948 Arab–Israeli War it was temporarily occupied by Arab forces.
