= Geulei Teiman =

Moshav in central Israel

Geulei Teiman: גְּאֻלֵי תֵּימָן (Hebrew)
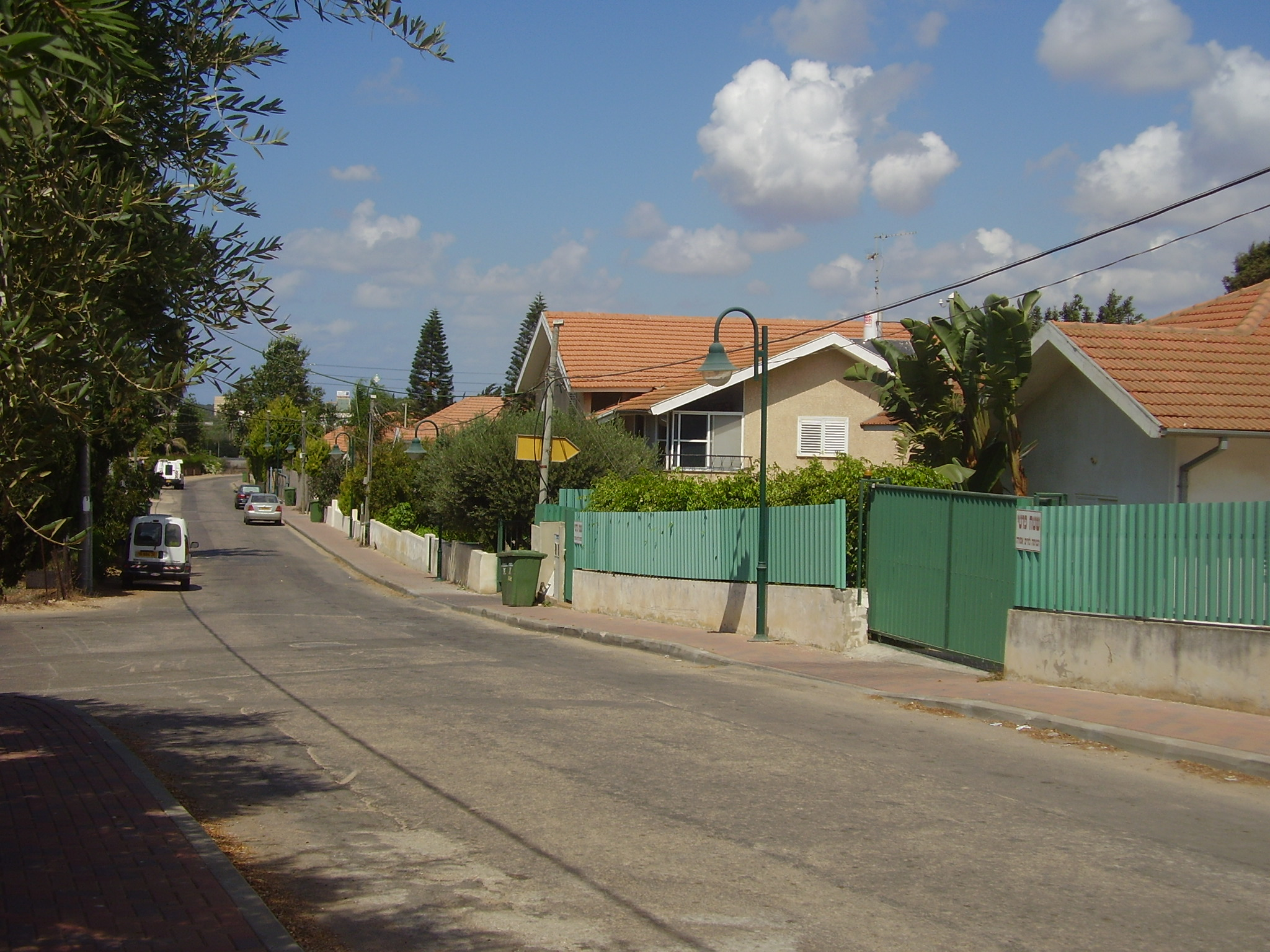

- Location within Central Israel
- Coordinates: 32°23′32″N 34°54′6″E
- Country: Israel
- District: Central
- Subdistrict: HaSharon
- Council: Hefer Valley
- Affiliation: Hapoel HaMizrachi
- Founded: 1948
- Founder: Yemenite Jews
- Population (2024): 415

Geulei Teiman (Hebrew: גְּאֻלֵי תֵּימָן, lit. 'The Redeemed of Yemen') is a religious moshav in central Israel. Located near Hadera in the Sharon plain, it falls under the jurisdiction of Hefer Valley Regional Council. In 2024 it had a population of 415.

== History ==
The moshav was founded in 1948 by residents of Kfar Yavetz, a village which was evacuated during the 1948 Arab–Israeli War; the land on which the village was built is located near the depopulated Arab village of Wadi al-Hawarith. The residents were immigrants and refugees from Yemen and affiliated with Hapoel HaMizrachi.

In 1967 Geulei Teiman was split into a moshav and a housing project, but the two neighborhoods were reunited in 1992.

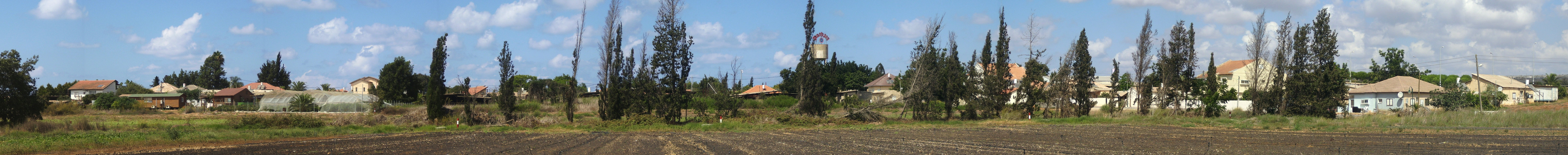
Panoramic view of Geulei Teiman from the south
