= Tel Mond =

Tel Mond תל מונד
- Local council

Hebrew transcription(s)
  - ISO 259: Tel Mond
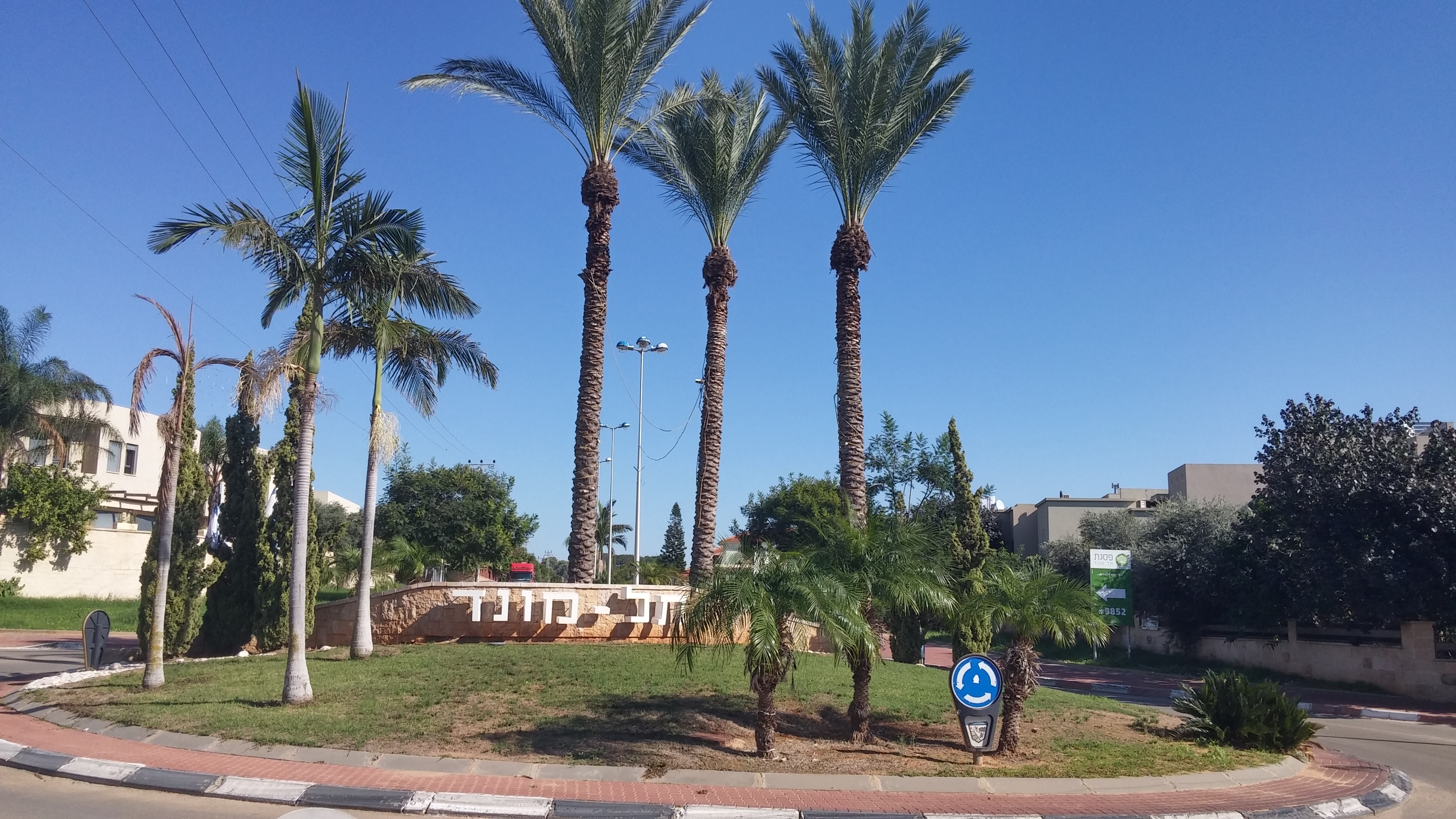

- Location within Central Israel Location within Israel
- Coordinates: 32°15′12″N 34°55′5″E
- Country: Israel
- District: Central
- Subdistrict: HaSharon
- Natural Region: Western Sharon
- Founded: 1929

Government
  - Head of Municipality: Lynn Kaplan (Elected December 2020)

Area
  - Total: 8,000 dunams (8.0 km^{2}; 3.1 sq mi)

Population (2024)
  - Total: 14,771
  - Density: 1,800/km^{2} (4,800/sq mi)
- Website: tel-mond.muni.il

Tel Mond (Hebrew: תל מונד) is a town in the Sharon region of Israel, located east of Netanya and north of Kfar Saba. In 2024 it had a population of 14,771..

== History ==
Tel Mond was founded on 16 June 1929 by Alfred Mond, 1st Baron Melchett. Lord Melchett was a British industrialist, a former cabinet minister and president of the British Zionist Foundation. The Palestine Plantations Company, headed by Mond, purchased land in the region and planted citrus orchards to provide employment for Jewish laborers. In 1933, a group of farmers purchased land from the company and established moshav Tel Mond. In 1936, another group established moshav Kfar Ziv, named after Baron Sieff who followed Lord Melchett and settled in Tel Mond with his wife. In 1943, new Olim from Yemen established Shechunat Ya'akov (Ya'akov neighborhood). The surrounding moshavim, Kfar Hess, Herut and Ein Vered, were also founded by the pioneers of Tel Mond.

Between 11 December 1949 and 10 June 1954, Tel Mond was a regional council, encompassing the villages of Herut, Kfar Hess, Ein Vered, Kfar Yavetz, Kfar Ziv, Shechunat Ya'akov, Bnei Dror, Mishmeret, as well as Tel Mond proper. In the 1950s, Neve Oved and Hadar Hayim were built to accommodate the large wave of immigration (mainly from Yemen) after the founding of the state. In 1954, these communities were merged to form the Local Council of Tel Mond.

Over the 2010s, the community has grown from a small town to a self-sufficient mini-city that provides services for other regional communities. It is growing rapidly, and is expected to have a population exceeding 25,000 in 2030.

In June 2013, Kehillat Mevaser Zion, a Modern Orthodox Community in Tel Mond, held an inauguration ceremony for the newly built Synagogue, attended by Naftali Bennett, the Minister for the Economy.

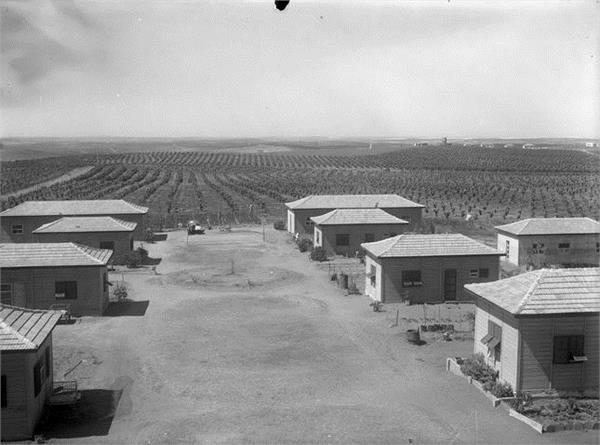
Tel Mond 1935

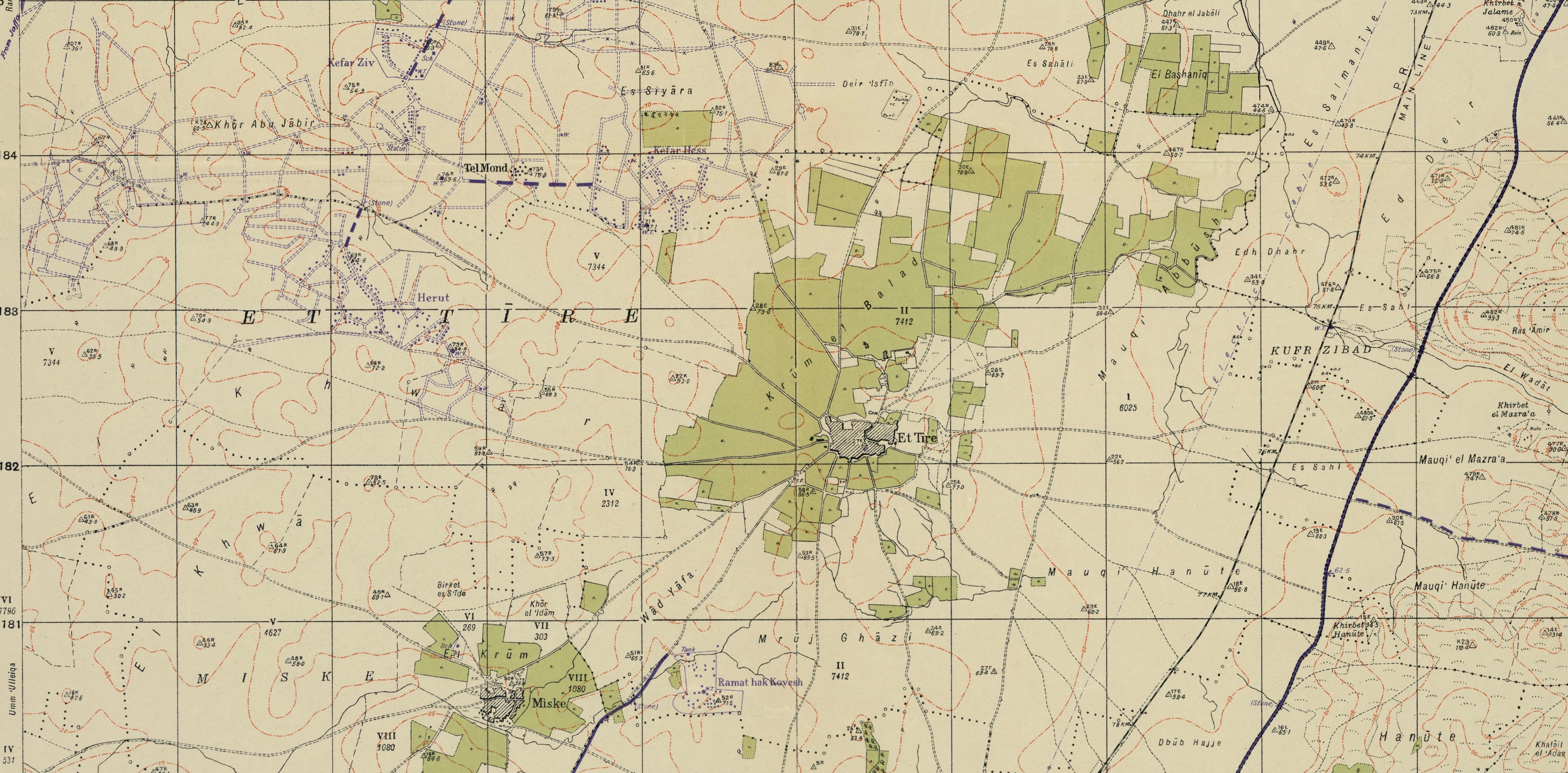
Tel Mond 1942 1:20,000

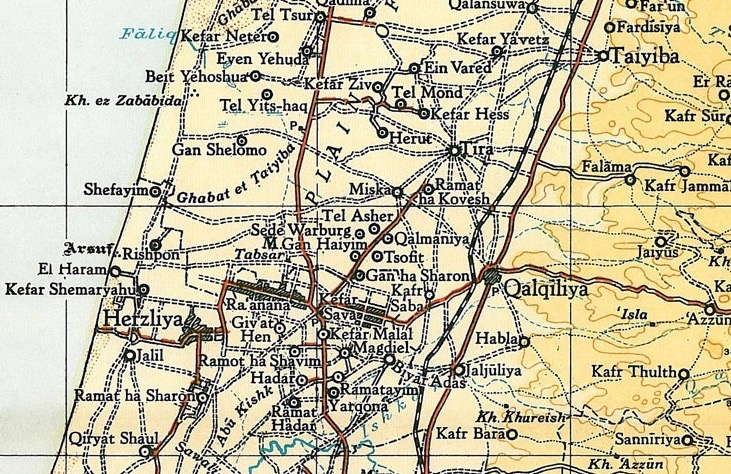
Tel Mond 1945 1:250,000

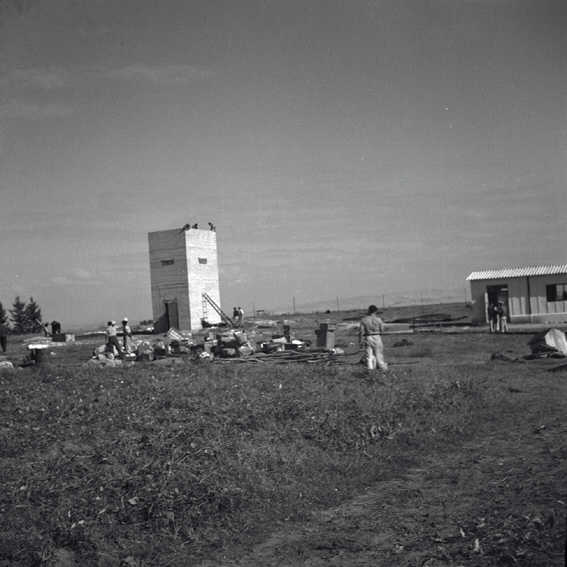
Members of Eitanim building defences Tel Mond, 1947

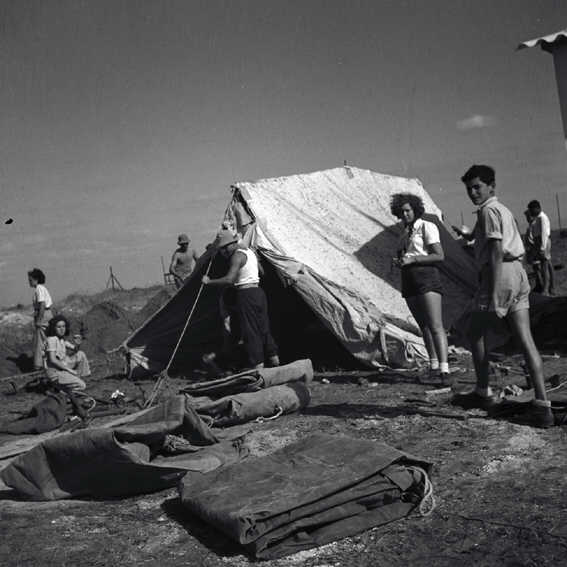
Eitanim workers Tel Mond 1947

== Demographics ==
Historical population
Year	Pop.	±%
1972	3,000	—
1983	3,000	+0.0%
1995	4,500	+50.0%
2008	10,000	+122.2%
2022	14,115	+41.1%
2024	14,771	+4.6%

== Landmarks ==
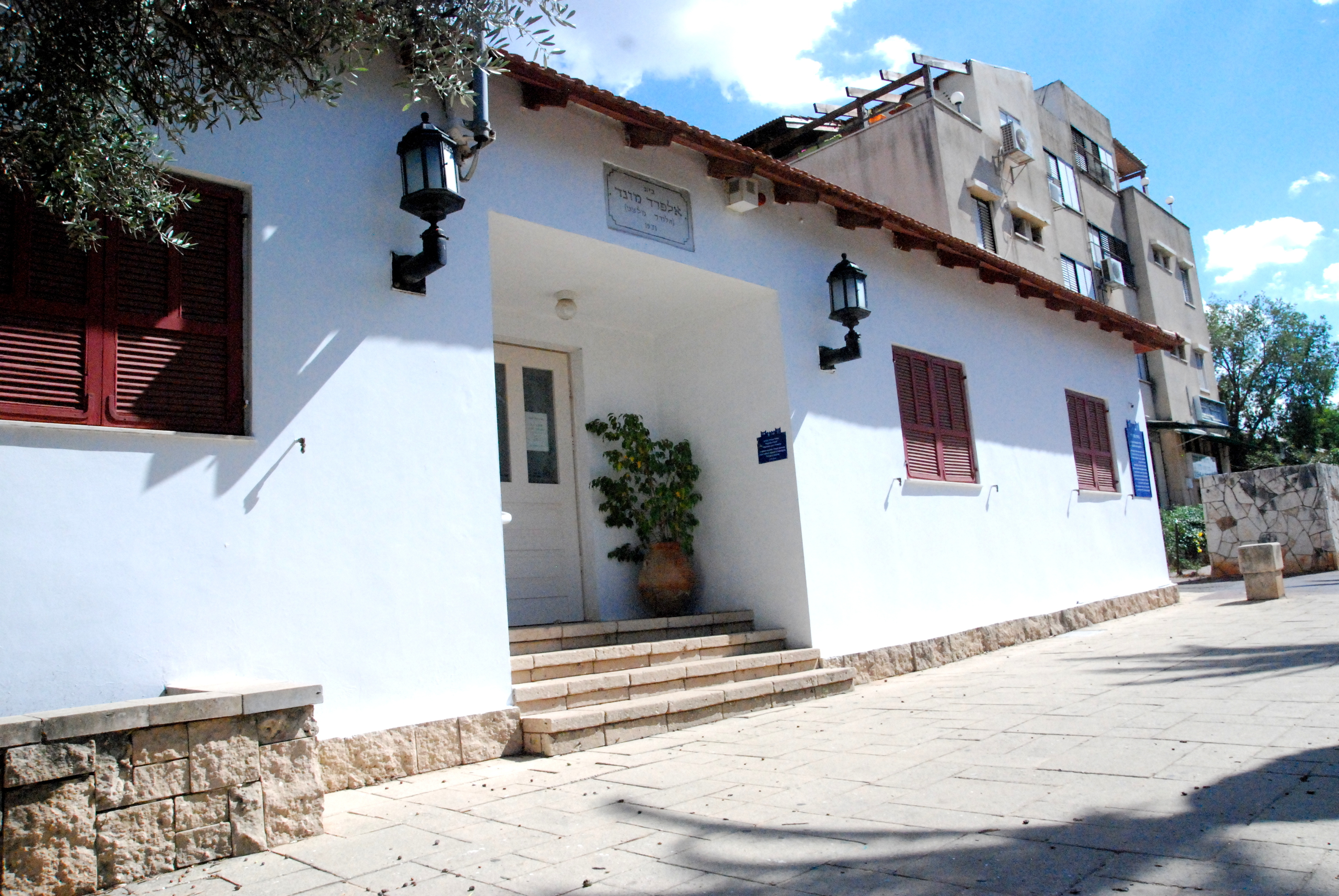
Beit HaLord Museum

The home of Lord Melchett has been turned into a museum, named House of the Lord. The museum documents the history of Tel Mond. The museum has a statue of Lord Melchett, designed by Batya Lishansky, located outside the house.

== Voting Patterns ==
In the 2022 election, 65 percent of voters in Tel Mond voted for the parties of the center-left coalition led by Yair Lapid, while 31 percent voted for the parties of the right-wing coalition led by Benjamin Netanyahu and 0.1 percent voted for the Arab parties.

In the 2026 election, 68 percent of voters in Tel Mond voted for the parties of the center-left coalition led by Gadi Eisenkot, while 26 percent voted for the parties of the right-wing coalition led by Benjamin Netanyahu and 0.2 percent voted for the Arab parties. An additional 3.8 percent voted for the Reservists, and 1.9 percent voted for Amcha Yisrael. Voter turnout increased 21 percent from the 2022 election.

== Notable residents ==
- Bart Berman, pianist and composer
- Avraham Hirschson, former Finance Minister
- Imanuel Rosen, journalist and television personality
- Yehoshua Sobol, playwright and theater director
- Maya Tahan (born 1999), tennis player

== Twin towns ==
- Sarasota, Florida (1994)
