= Porat (surname) =

Porat is a Jewish surname (not to be confused with von Porat, a Swedish noble family name). Notable people with the surname include:

- Ariel Porat (born 1956), Israeli jurist and academic
- Dina Porat (born 1943), Israeli historian
- Elisha Porat (1938–2013), Israeli poet and writer
- Hanan Porat (1943–2011), Israeli rabbi, educator and politician
- Iddo Porat, Israeli legal scholar
- Marc Porat, compiler of The Information Economy (1977)
- Marc Porat, American tech entrepreneur and angel investor
- Matan Porat, Israeli pianist and composer
- Orna Porat (1924–2015), German-born Israeli theater actress
- Ruby Porat-Shoval, Israeli actress
- Ruth Porat (born 1957), British-born American financial executive
- Yosef Porat (1909–1996), German-Israeli chess player

== See also ==
- Porat, Israel
- Ben-Porat
