= Ein Sarid =

Moshav in central Israel

Ein Sarid: עֵין שָׂרִיד (Hebrew)
- Location within Central Israel Location within Israel
- Coordinates: 32°16′27″N 34°56′2″E
- Country: Israel
- District: Central
- Subdistrict: HaSharon
- Council: Lev HaSharon
- Founded: 1950
- Population (2024): 1,504
- Website: ensarid.muni.il

Ein Sarid (Hebrew: עֵין שָׂרִיד, lit. 'Survivor Spring') is a moshav in central Israel. Located in the Sharon plain, it falls under the jurisdiction of Lev HaSharon Regional Council. In 2024 it had a population of 1,504.

== History ==
Before the 20th century the area formed part of the Forest of Sharon. It was an open woodland dominated by Mount Tabor Oak, which extended from Kfar Yona in the north to Ra'anana in the south. The local inhabitants traditionally used the area for pasture, firewood and intermittent cultivation. The intensification of settlement and agriculture in the coastal plain during the 19th century, under the Ottoman Empire led to deforestation and subsequent environmental degradation.

The village was founded in 1950 as a ma'abara. It was expanded in 1989 and again in 1994; the new part becoming known as Ein Sarid HaHadasha (lit. 'New Ein Sarid').
