= Zemer =

Arab town in central Israel

Zemer: זמר; زيمر
- Local council (from 1988)

Hebrew transcription(s)
  - ISO 259: Zemr
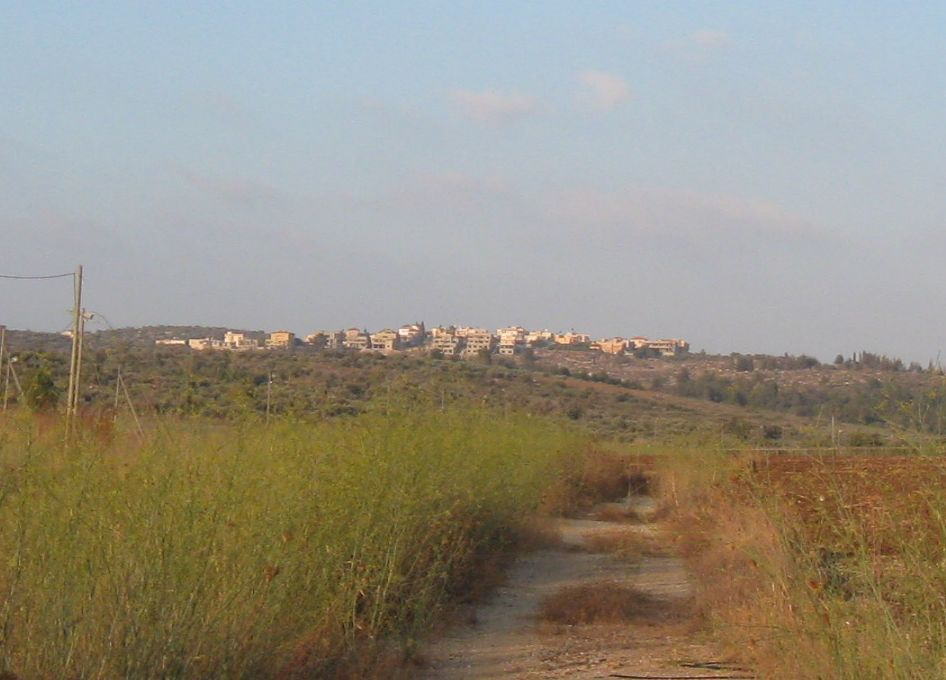

- Location within Central Israel Location within Israel
- Coordinates: 32°22′4″N 35°1′59″E
- Grid position: 154/197 PAL
- Country: Israel
- District: Central
- Subdistrict: HaSharon
- Natural Region: Eastern Sharon
- Founded: 1988 (merger)

Government
  - Head of Municipality: Yassin Harzalla

Area
  - Total: 8,203 dunams (8.203 km^{2}; 3.167 sq mi)

Population (2024)
  - Total: 7,953
  - Density: 969.5/km^{2} (2,511/sq mi)
- Name meaning: Khurbet Ibthan; meaning "Ruin of gardens, or of soft soil"

Zemer (Hebrew: זמר, Arabic: زيمر) is an Arab local council in the Central District of Israel. It is located in the Arab Triangle area, between Baqa al-Gharbiyye and Bat Hefer on Road 574. Zemer is the result of a merger of four villages – Bir al-Sika, Ibtan, Marja and Yama - in 1988.

== History ==
Archaeological work in Yama brought to light settlement remains ranging from the Pre-Pottery Neolithic B (PPNB) to the Ottoman period. At Ibtan, potsherds dating from the Hellenistic, Roman and Byzantine period have been found.

=== Metal Ages ===
Middle Bronze Age II findings from Yama have been tentatively identified to belong to the ancient site of Yaham. Yaham was mentioned in Egyptian sources regarding pharaohs Thutmose III and Shoshenq I. The 15th century BCE annals describing the campaign of Thutmose III against a coalition of Canaanite city-states recount how the pharaoh camped at Yaham before marching on through the pass of Aruna (today's Wadi Ara), at whose exit he attacked and captured the city of Megiddo.

=== Middle Ages and Ottoman Empire ===
In 1265, two of the villages were mentioned among the estates which the Mamluk sultan Baibars granted his emirs after he had defeated the Crusaders: The whole of Ibthan (Bathan) was given to his emir 'Alam al-Din Sanjar al-Halabi al-Salihi, while Yamma was divided equally between the emirs Saif al-Din Itamish al-Sa'di and Shams al-Din Aqsunqur.

Yama and Ibtan appeared in Ottoman tax registers compiled in 1596, in the Nahiyas of Qaqun and Jabal Sami, respectively, of the Nablus Liwa. Yama had a population of 18 Muslim households and 5 bachelors, while Ibtan was indicated as empty even though it paid taxes.

In 1882, in the PEF's Survey of Western Palestine, only Khurbet Ibthan was noted, with "traces of ruins and a well."

=== British Mandate and Israel ===
In the 1922 census of Palestine conducted by the British Mandate authorities, Bir al-Sikka had a population of 36, Ibthan 56 and Yamma 48, all Muslims. Until 1948, all four villages were administratively related to the modern-day Palestinian town of Deir al-Ghusun.

Zemer's population at the end of 2009 was 5,700, and its jurisdiction is 8,203 dunams. The population increased to 6,375 in 2014. The mayor of Zemer is Yassin Harzalla.

== Voting Patterns ==
In the 2022 election, 98 percent of voters in Zemer voted for the Arab parties, while 1 percent voted for the parties of the center-left coalition led by Yair Lapid and 0.4 percent voted for the parties of the right-wing coalition led by Benjamin Netanyahu. Among the voters for the Arab parties, 57 percent voted for Balad, while 27 percent voted for Ra'am and 16 percent voted for the Hadash–Ta'al list.

In the 2026 election, 97 percent of voters in Zemer voted for the Arab parties, while 1.3 percent voted for the parties of the center-left coalition led by Gadi Eisenkot and 0.2 percent voted for the parties of the right-wing coalition led by Benjamin Netanyahu. Among the voters for the Arab parties, 72 percent voted for the Joint List, while 28 percent voted for Ra'am. Voter turnout increased 60 percent from the 2022 election.

== Bibliography ==
- Abu Fana, Mohammed (2006-01-23). "Ibthan Final Report". Hadashot Arkheologiyot – Excavations and Surveys in Israel (118).
- Barron, J. B., ed. (1923). Palestine: Report and General Abstracts of the Census of 1922. Government of Palestine.
- Conder, C.R.; Kitchener, H.H. (1882). The Survey of Western Palestine: Memoirs of the Topography, Orography, Hydrography, and Archaeology. Vol. 2. London: Committee of the Palestine Exploration Fund.
- Department of Statistics (1945). Village Statistics, April, 1945. Government of Palestine.
- Hadawi, S. (1970). Village Statistics of 1945: A Classification of Land and Area ownership in Palestine. Palestine Liberation Organization Research Centre.
- Hütteroth, W.-D.; Abdulfattah, K. (1977). Historical Geography of Palestine, Transjordan and Southern Syria in the Late 16th Century. Erlanger Geographische Arbeiten, Sonderband 5. Erlangen, Germany: Vorstand der Fränkischen Geographischen Gesellschaft. ISBN 3-920405-41-2.
- Ibn al-Furat (1971). Jonathan Riley-Smith (ed.). Ayyubids, Mamluks and Crusaders: Selections from the "Tarikh Al-duwal Wal-muluk" of Ibn Al-Furat : the Text, the Translation. Vol. 2. Translation by Malcolm Cameron Lyons, Ursula Lyons. Cambridge: W. Heffer.
- Masarwa, Durar (2011-08-10). "Ibthan (North) Final Report". Hadashot Arkheologiyot – Excavations and Surveys in Israel (123).
- Masarwa, Durar (2011-09-07). "Ibthan (North) Final Report". Hadashot Arkheologiyot – Excavations and Surveys in Israel (123).
- Masarwa, Durar (2011-11-29). "Ibthan Final Report". Hadashot Arkheologiyot – Excavations and Surveys in Israel (123).
- Masarwa, Durar (2012-12-06). "Ibthan Final Report". Hadashot Arkheologiyot – Excavations and Surveys in Israel (124).
- Masarwa, Durar (2015-03-09). "Ibthan Final Report". Hadashot Arkheologiyot – Excavations and Surveys in Israel (127).
- Masarwa, Durar (2016-03-31). "Ibthan Final Report". Hadashot Arkheologiyot – Excavations and Surveys in Israel (128).
- Palmer, E.H. (1881). The Survey of Western Palestine: Arabic and English Name Lists Collected During the Survey by Lieutenants Conder and Kitchener, R. E. Transliterated and Explained by E.H. Palmer. Committee of the Palestine Exploration Fund.
- Toueg, Ron (2010-09-05). "Ibthan Final Report". Hadashot Arkheologiyot – Excavations and Surveys in Israel (122).
- Zertal, A. (2016). The Manasseh Hill Country Survey. Vol. 3. Boston: BRILL. ISBN 978-9004312302. pp. 439-440
