= Kfar Yavetz =

Moshav in central Israel

Kfar Yavetz: כְּפַר יַעֲבֵץ (Hebrew)
- Location within Central Israel
- Coordinates: 32°16′30″N 34°57′53″E
- Country: Israel
- District: Central
- Subdistrict: HaSharon
- Council: Lev HaSharon
- Affiliation: Hapoel HaMizrachi
- Founded: 10 April 1932
- Population (2024): 721

Kfar Yavetz (Hebrew: כְּפַר יַעֲבֵץ, lit. 'Yavetz Village') is a religious moshav in central Israel. Located in the Sharon plain near the Arab city of Tayibe, it falls under the jurisdiction of Lev HaSharon Regional Council. In 2024 it had a population of 721.

== History ==
The village was founded on 10 April 1932 as a kibbutz. It was named for Rabbi Ze'ev Yavetz, a founder of the Mizrachi movement.

As the kibbutz was situated on the front, opposite the Iraqi army sent as auxiliaries during the 1948 Arab-Israeli War, the inhabitants were evacuated for their safety, and the kibbutz was turned into army base. The residents resettled in Geulei Teiman and the village was rebuilt as a moshav in 1951, incorporating within it new immigrants from Yemen and from central Europe.

Kfar Yavetz is located in the heart of the Triangle, near the Wadi Ara highway.

On 7 July 2003 Mazal Afari, 65, a resident of Kfar Yavetz was killed in her home in a suicide bombing carried out by Islamic Jihad. Afari, a mother of eight, was waiting for her husband and sons to return from synagogue. The terrorist slipped into the house unnoticed and detonated a bomb he was carrying in a bag. Three of her grandchildren were injured in the attack. The house was destroyed in the blast.
