= Bnei Dror =

Moshav in central Israel

Bnei Dror: בְּנֵי דְּרוֹר (Hebrew); بني درور (Arabic)
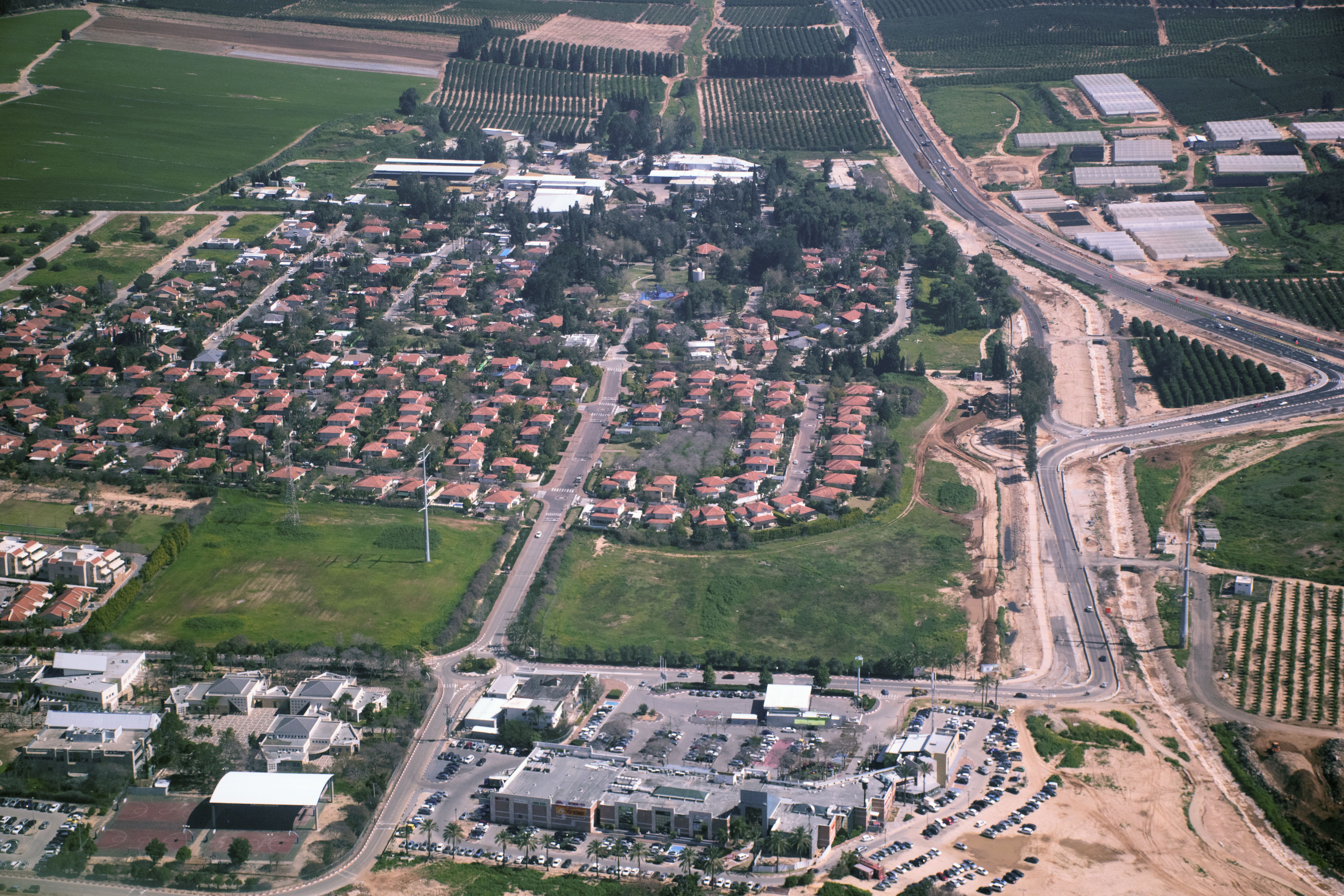

- Location within Central Israel Location within Israel
- Coordinates: 32°15′42″N 34°54′5″E
- Country: Israel
- District: Central
- Subdistrict: HaSharon
- Council: Lev HaSharon
- Affiliation: Moshavim Movement
- Founded: 12 May 1946
- Founder: Demobbed British Army soldiers
- Population (2024): 1,346
- Website: www.bnei-dror.co.il

Bnei Dror (Hebrew: בְּנֵי דְּרוֹר, lit. Sons of Liberty) is a moshav shitufi in central Israel. Located near Netanya and covering 3,200 dunams, it falls under the jurisdiction of Lev HaSharon Regional Council. In 2024 it had a population of 1,346.

== History ==
The village was founded on 12 May 1946 by demobilised Jewish soldiers discharged from the British Army Having served in campaigns across North Africa and Italy during World War II and had first had the idea of establishing a moshav in 1941. The name “Bnei Dror” reflects their shared aspiration for a life of independence and self-determination.

Residents work in agriculture and factories for furniture, sunglasses and packaging, as well as a shopping centre, regional school and pensioners' home.

Upon establishment, Bnei Dror faced challenges common to new agricultural settlements, including the need to cultivate land, establish infrastructure, and build a community from scratch. Initially, residents worked mainly in agriculture and later developed industrial activities such as furniture, sunglasses, and packaging production. Over the years, the moshav expanded its facilities to include a shopping center, a regional school, and a home for the elderly. These additions provided diverse opportunities for work and community development, aligning with the founders' original vision of a sustainable and resilient community.
