= Qalansawe =

Arab city in Israel

Qalansawe: קלנסווה; قلنسوة
- City

Hebrew transcription(s)
  - ISO 259: Qalansuwa
  - Translit.: Kalansuwa or Qalansuwa
  - Also spelled: Kalansoueh, Qalansuwa (unofficial)
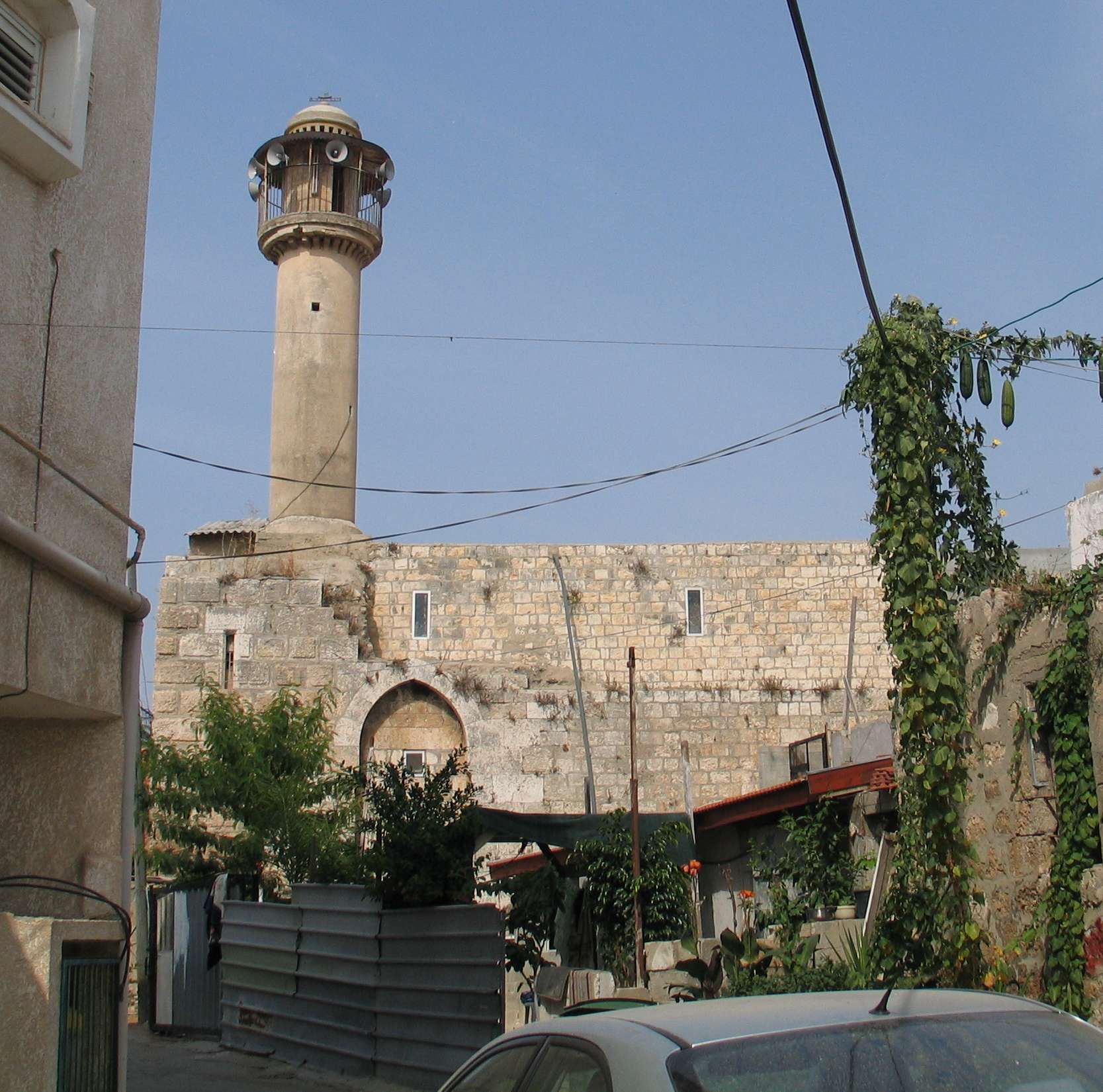

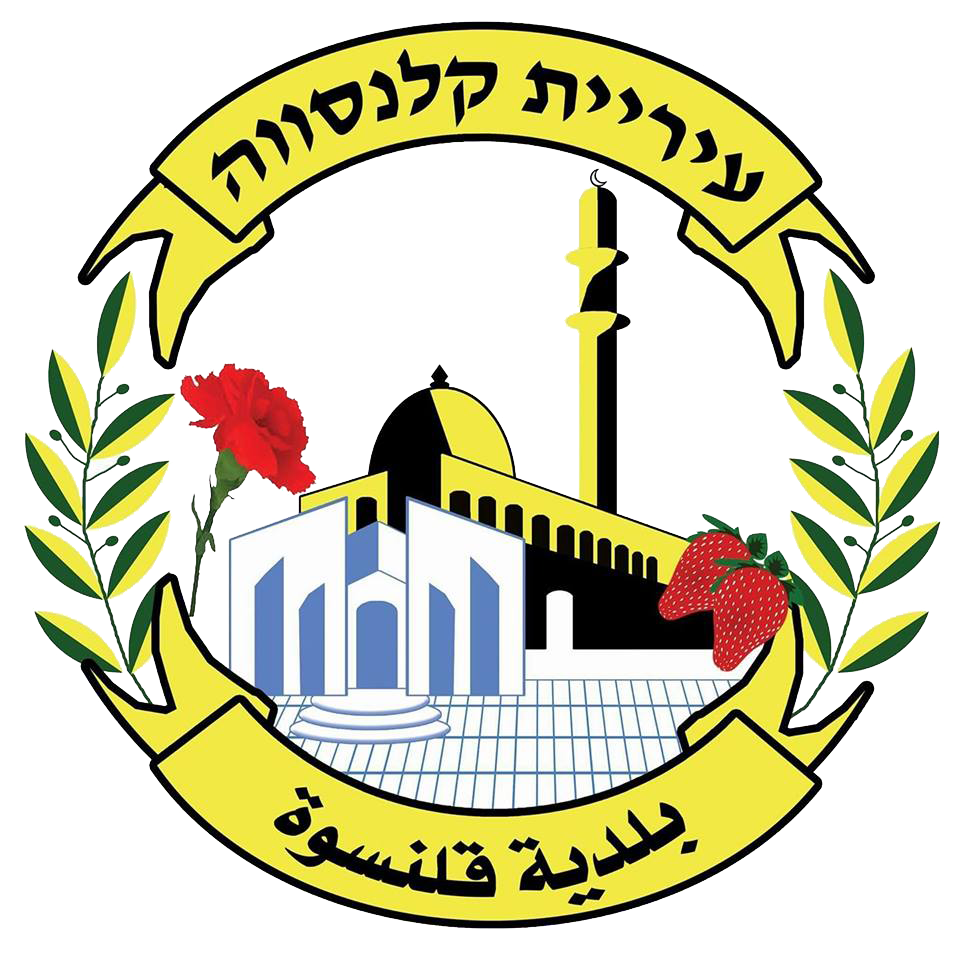
- Emblem of Qalansawe

- Location within Central Israel Location within Israel
- Coordinates: 32°16′56″N 34°59′0″E
- Grid position: 198600/687800 ITM; 148/187 PAL
- Country: Israel
- District: Central
- Subdistrict: HaSharon
- Natural Region: Eastern Sharon

Government
  - Mayor: Yossif Takrouri

Area
  - Total: 8,400 dunams (8.4 km^{2}; 3.2 sq mi)

Population (2024)
  - Total: 25,167
  - Density: 3,000/km^{2} (7,800/sq mi)

Qalansawe or Qalansuwa (Arabic: قلنسوة, Hebrew: קלנסווה, lit. "turban") is an Arab city in the Central District of Israel. Part of the Triangle, in 2024 it had a population of 25,167.

== History ==
=== Early Muslim period ===
During the Abbasid Revolution in 750, which toppled the Umayyad Caliphate, numerous members of the Umayyad dynasty were deported to Qalansawe from Egypt for execution, including descendants of caliphs Umar II (r. 717–720) and Sulayman ibn Abd al-Malik (r. 715–717). Yaqut, a 13th-century scholar, wrote that "many of the Omayyads were slain there." From the ninth century period, Qalansawe became a stop on the Cairo-Damascus road, between Lajjun and Ramla.

=== Crusader and Mamluk periods ===
During the Crusader period, the village was known as Calanson, Calansue, Calanzon or Kalensue. In 1128, it was given to the Hospitallers by the knight Godfrey of Flujeac. Yaqut (d. 1229) wrote that Qalansawe, Castle of the Plains, of the Crusaders, was a fortress near Ramle. Remnants of a crusader fortress remain today. It remained in Hospitallers hands (except for 1187–1191) until Baybars took it in 1265. However, during this period the lord of Caesarea appears to have retained overlordship.

In 1265, after the Mamluks had defeated the Crusaders, Qalansawe was mentioned among the estates which Sultan Baibars granted his followers. It was divided equally between two of his emirs: Izz al-Din Aidamur al-Halabi al-Salihi and Shams al-Din Sunqur al-Rumi al-Salihi. The Muslim village was built around a Crusader fort at its core.

=== Ottoman period ===
In 1517, the village was included in the Ottoman Empire with the rest of Palestine. Qalansuwa was an important stop on the Cairo-Damascus road.

In the 1596 tax-records it appeared located in the Nahiya of Bani Sa'b of the Liwa of Nablus. It had a population of 29 Muslim households. They paid a fixed tax-rate of 33.3% on agricultural products, including wheat, barley, summer crops, olives, goats or beehives, and a press for olives or grapes; a total of 11,342 akçe.

Pierre Jacotin called the village Qalensawi on his map from 1799.

==== 19th-century explorers ====
In 1870, the French explorer Victor Guérin found it to have 500 inhabitants. He then examined the remains of a church facing east and west, and divided into three naves, terminating to the east in three apses. It was constructed of cut stones, some of them slightly embossed. The naves were separated one from the other by monolithic columns and probably crowned by Corinthian capitals. One of them, of white marble, was repurposed by a villager who took it from the site of the church. The rest of the capitals and shafts were missing. An elegant door with a pointed arch was still standing. Under the nave ran a vaulted crypt, now divided into several compartments, which served as a shelter for several families. Ancient walls were found near the church and below the village. One was surmounted by a vaulted arcade in cut stones.

In the 1860s, the Ottoman authorities granted the village an agricultural plot of land called Ghabat Umm Ulayqa, or Ghabat Qalansuwa, in the former confines of the Forest of Arsur (Ar. Al-Ghaba) in the coastal plain, west of the village.

In 1882, the Palestine Exploration Fund's Survey of Western Palestine described it as being of moderate size, and the seat of a Caimacam. In the centre of the village was a Crusader tower and hall, surrounded by the village houses, mostly made of adobe. Wells and a spring to the west supplied water.

=== British Mandate ===
In the 1922 census of Palestine conducted by the British Mandate authorities, Qualansawe had a population of 871 Muslims, increasing in the 1931 census to 1069, still all Muslim, in a total of 225 houses.

By the 1945 statistics, the village had 1540 Muslim inhabitants, who owned a total of owned 17,249 dunams of land. 473 dunams were for citrus and bananas, 759 plantations and irrigable land, 15,936 for cereals, while 47 dunams were built-up (urban) land.

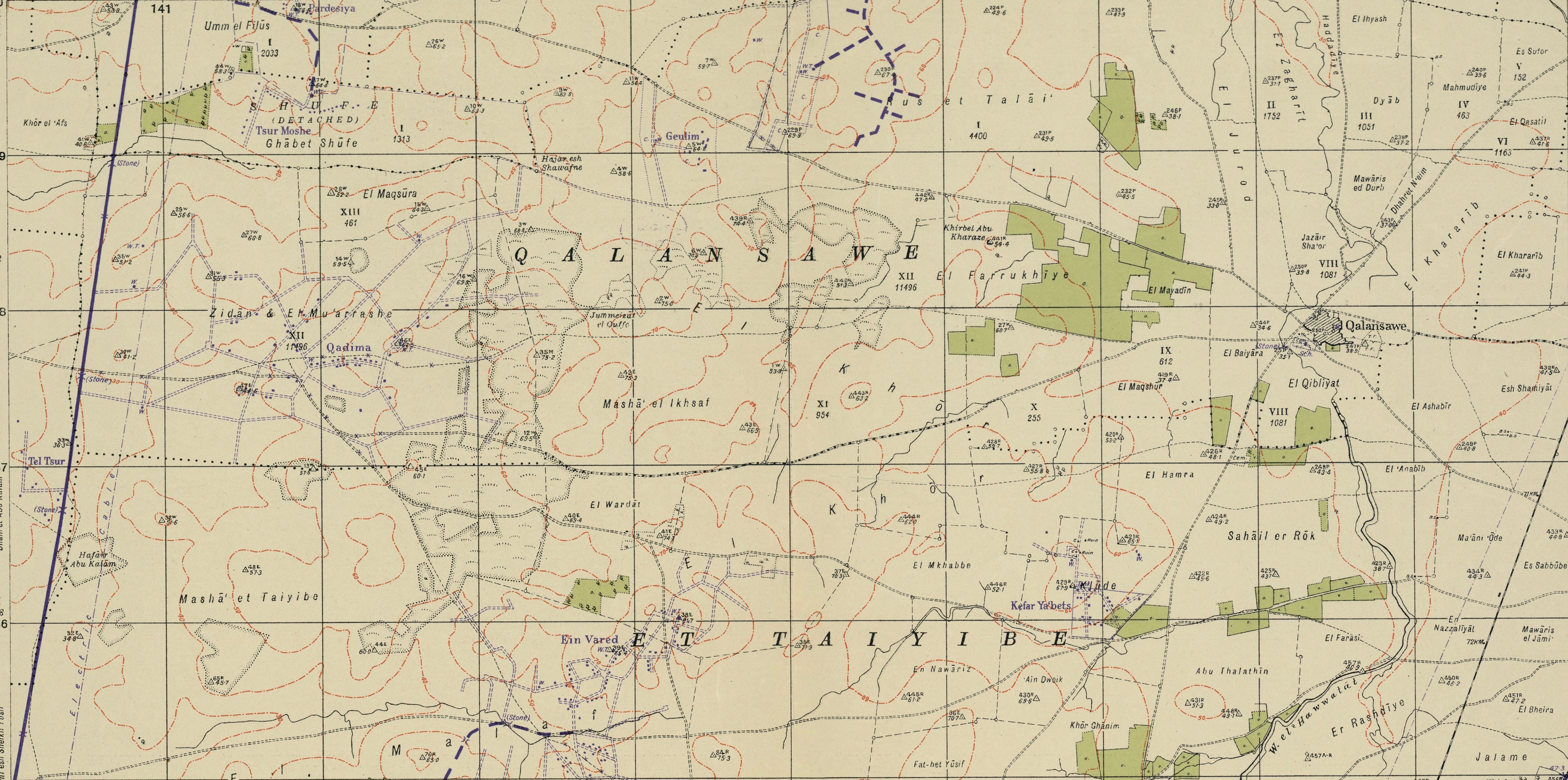
Qalansawe 1942 1:20,000

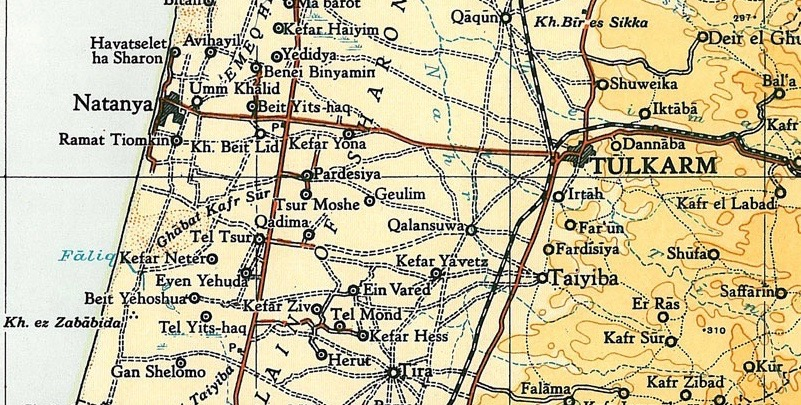
Qalansawe (Qalansuwa) 1945 1:250,000

=== Israel ===
==== 20th century ====
During the 1948 Palestine war, Jewish forces had planned to attack Qalansawe but the plan was not carried out. Qalansawe came under Israeli sovereignty in May 1949 as part of the Israel-Jordan armistice agreement. Political considerations then prevented the expulsion of the villagers.

In 1955 the village achieved local council status. In 1957 it was connected to running water. By 1962, land ownership had dropped to 6,620 dunams, mostly due to expropriation of land by the Israeli government in 1953–1954.

==== 21st century ====
In 2000 Qalansawe was declared a city. In January 2017, the Israeli government demolished 11 buildings built by 4 families, on the grounds that they were built without permits. The families claimed they were given two days notice, which was insufficient for a legal response. The mayor of Qalansawe, announcing his resignation, said that he had fought for years to widen the town's urban building plan without success, which is why the residents built on agricultural land. Thousands of people rallied in support of the village and a one-day strike was called.

== Demographics ==
Historical population
Year	Pop.	±%
1972	4,800	—
1983	7,300	+52.1%
1995	11,600	+58.9%
2008	18,200	+56.9%
2022	23,951	+31.6%
2024	25,167	+5.1%

In 2001, the ethnic makeup of the city was virtually all Arab Muslims without significant Jewish population. There were 7,700 males and 7,300 females. 53.2% of the residents were 19 years of age or younger, 17.1% were between 20 and 29, 17.9% between 30 and 44, 8.0% from 45 to 59, 1.6% from 60 to 64, and 2.2% 65 years of age or older. The population growth rate in 2001 was 3.5%.

== Voting Patterns ==
In the 2022 election, 97 percent of voters in Qalansawe voted for the Arab parties, while 2 percent voted for the parties of the center-left coalition led by Yair Lapid and 1 percent voted for the parties of the right-wing coalition led by Benjamin Netanyahu. Among the voters for the Arab parties, 43 percent voted for the Hadash–Ta'al list, while 33 percent voted for Balad and 24 percent voted for Ra'am.

In the 2026 election, 97 percent of voters in Qalansawe voted for the Arab parties, while 2 percent voted for the parties of the center-left coalition led by Gadi Eisenkot and 0.3 percent voted for the parties of the right-wing coalition led by Benjamin Netanyahu. Among the voters for the Arab parties, 78 percent voted for the Joint List, while 22 percent voted for Ra'am. Voter turnout increased 62 percent from the 2022 election.

== Notable residents ==
- Ella Waweya - Spokesperson for the IDF Arabic communications department

== See also ==
- Arab localities in Israel

== Bibliography ==
- Barron, J.B., ed. (1923). Palestine: Report and General Abstracts of the Census of 1922. Government of Palestine.
- Conder, C.R.; Kitchener, H.H. (1882). The Survey of Western Palestine: Memoirs of the Topography, Orography, Hydrography, and Archaeology. Vol. 2. London: Committee of the Palestine Exploration Fund. (pp. 199-201.)
- Doumani, B. (1995). Rediscovering Palestine, Merchants and Peasants in Jabal Nablus, 1700–1900. University of California Press. p. 19
- Government of Palestine, Department of Statistics (1945). Village Statistics, April, 1945.
- Guérin, V. (1875). Description Géographique Historique et Archéologique de la Palestine (in French). Vol. 2: Samarie, pt. 2. Paris: L'Imprimerie Nationale.
- Hadawi, S. (1970). Village Statistics of 1945: A Classification of Land and Area ownership in Palestine. Palestine Liberation Organization Research Center.
- Hartmann, Richard (1910): Die Straße von Damaskus nach Kairo Zeitschrift der Deutschen Morgenländischen Gesellschaft › Bd. 64 (Cited in Petersen, 2001)
- Hütteroth, W.-D.; Abdulfattah, K. (1977). Historical Geography of Palestine, Transjordan and Southern Syria in the Late 16th Century. Erlanger Geographische Arbeiten, Sonderband 5. Erlangen, Germany: Vorstand der Fränkischen Geographischen Gesellschaft. ISBN 3-920405-41-2.
- Ibn al-Furat (1971). J. Riley-Smith (ed.). Ayyubids, Mamluks and Crusaders: Selections from the "Tarikh Al-duwal Wal-muluk" of Ibn Al-Furat : the Text, the Translation. Vol. 2. Translation by Malcolm Cameron Lyons, Ursula Lyons. Cambridge: W. Heffer.
- Karmon, Y. (1960). "An Analysis of Jacotin's Map of Palestine" (PDF). Israel Exploration Journal. 10 (3, 4): 155–173, 244–253. Archived from the original (PDF) on 2019-12-22.
- Le Strange, G. (1890). Palestine Under the Moslems: A Description of Syria and the Holy Land from A.D. 650 to 1500. Committee of the Palestine Exploration Fund.
- Mills, E., ed. (1932). Census of Palestine 1931. Population of Villages, Towns and Administrative Areas. Jerusalem: Government of Palestine.
- Morris, B. (2004). Birth of the Palestinian Refugee Problem Revisited. Cambridge University Press. ISBN 0-521-00967-7.
- Mukaddasi (1886). Description of Syria, including Palestine. London: Palestine Pilgrims' Text Society. (pp. 95, 97)
- Palmer, E.H. (1881). The Survey of Western Palestine: Arabic and English Name Lists Collected During the Survey by Lieutenants Conder and Kitchener, R. E. Transliterated and Explained by E.H. Palmer. Committee of the Palestine Exploration Fund.
- Petersen, Andrew (2001). A Gazetteer of Buildings in Muslim Palestine (British Academy Monographs in Archaeology). Vol. 1. Oxford University Press. ISBN 978-0-19-727011-0. Archived from the original on 2021-05-28.
- Pringle, D. (1997). Secular buildings in the Crusader Kingdom of Jerusalem: an archaeological Gazetter. Cambridge University Press. ISBN 0521-46010-7.
- Pringle, D. (1998). The Churches of the Crusader Kingdom of Jerusalem: L-Z (excluding Tyre). Vol. II. Cambridge University Press. ISBN 0-521-39037-0. (p. 161)
- Robinson, E.; Smith, E. (1841). Biblical Researches in Palestine, Mount Sinai and Arabia Petraea: A Journal of Travels in the year 1838. Vol. 3. Boston: Crocker & Brewster. (p. 47)
- Robinson, Chase F. (2010). "The Violence of the Abbasid Revolution". Living Islamic History: Studies in Honour of Professor Carole Hillenbrand. Edinburgh University Press. ISBN 978-0-7486-3738-6.
- Röhricht, R. (1904). (RRH Ad) Regesta regni Hierosolymitani Additamentum (in Latin). Berlin: Libraria Academica Wageriana.
