= Ein Vered =

Moshav in central Israel

Ein Vered: עֵין וֶרֶד (Hebrew)
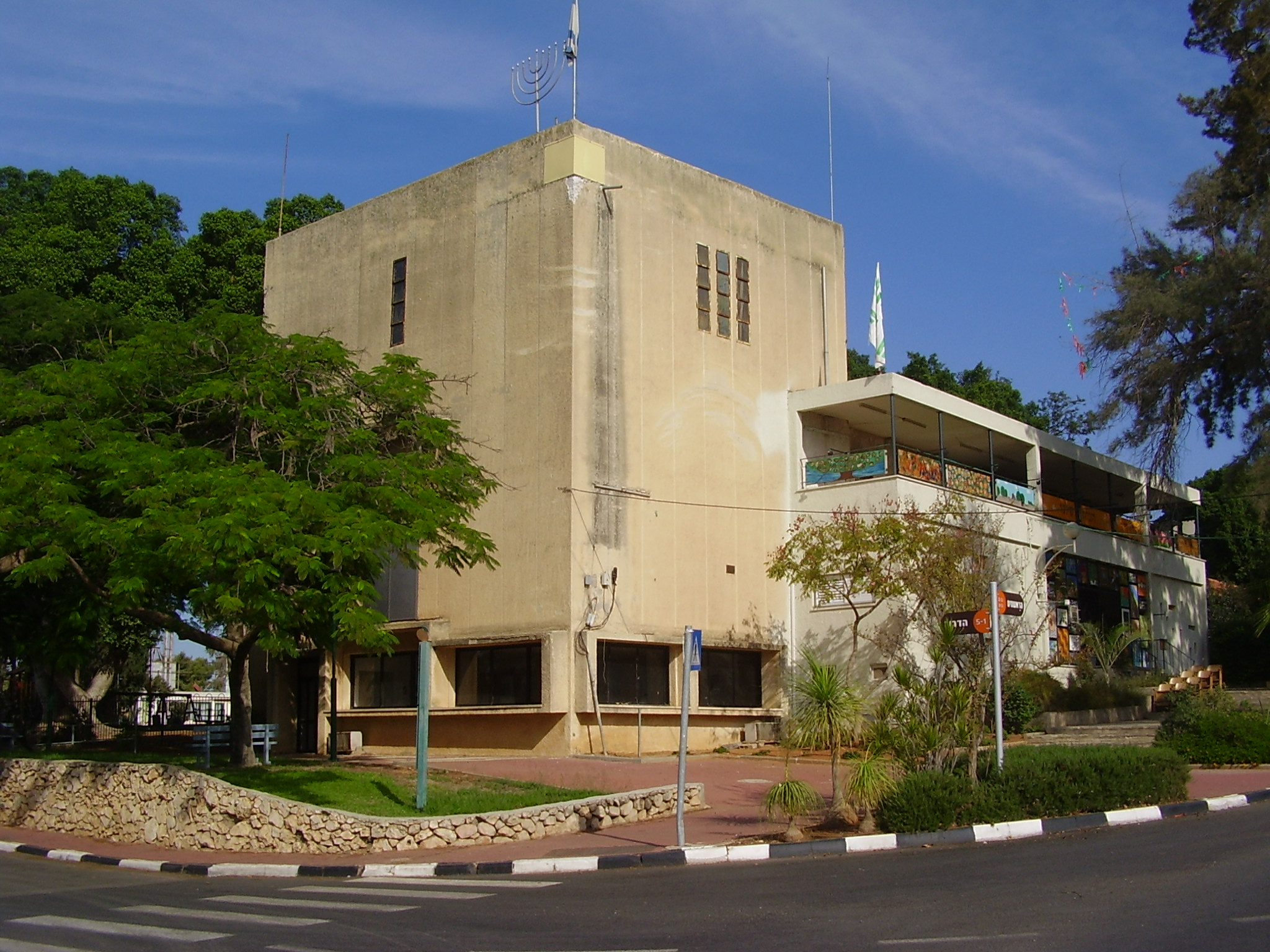

- Location within Central Israel Location within Israel
- Coordinates: 32°15′56″N 34°56′0″E
- Country: Israel
- District: Central
- Subdistrict: HaSharon
- Council: Lev HaSharon
- Affiliation: Moshavim Movement
- Founded: 1930
- Founder: Tel Aviv residents
- Population (2024): 1,673

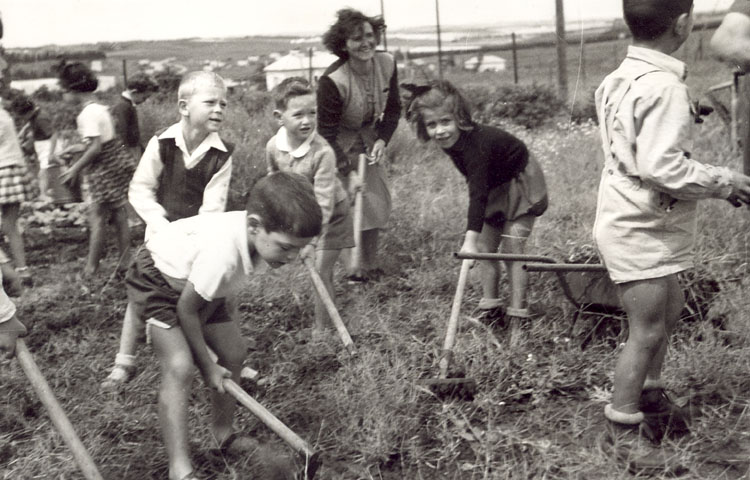
Farming in Ein Vered, 1950

Ein Vered (Hebrew: עֵין וֶרֶד, lit. 'Rose Spring') is a moshav in central Israel. Located in the Sharon plain, it falls under the jurisdiction of Lev HaSharon Regional Council. In 2024 it had a population of 1,673.

== History ==
Before the 20th century the area formed part of the Forest of the Sharon area. It was an open woodland dominated by Mount Tabor Oak, which extended from Kfar Yona in the north, to Ra'anana in the south. The local inhabitants traditionally used the area for pasture, firewood and intermittent cultivation. Intensification of settlements and agriculture in the coastal plain during Ottoman rule in the 19th century led to massive deforestation and subsequent environmental degradation.

Ein Vered was established in the southern Sharon in 1930, by South African Jewry on land purchased by the Jewish National Fund, and named after 'Ayun el Werdat (Arabic for " the Women's Water-Drawers Spring"), the wells serving the area. It was originally an intensive farming community. In 1947 it had a population of 450.

Citrus groves, field crops, beehives and flowers were the principal branches of local agriculture.
