= Triangle (Israel) =

Arab-Israeli towns along the Green Line

Coordinates: 32°15′15″N 34°59′40″E

Major localities in the Triangle

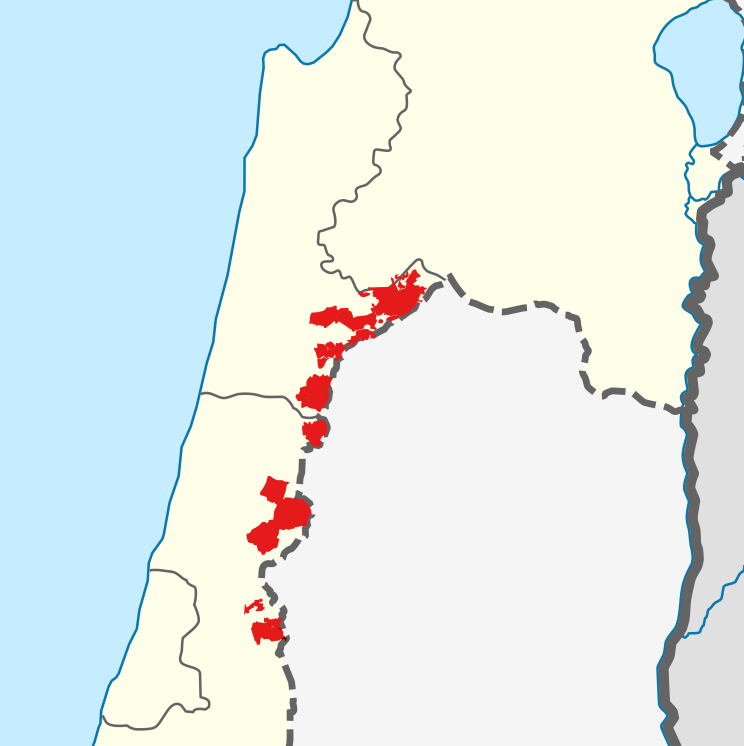
Triangle map showing urban areas in red

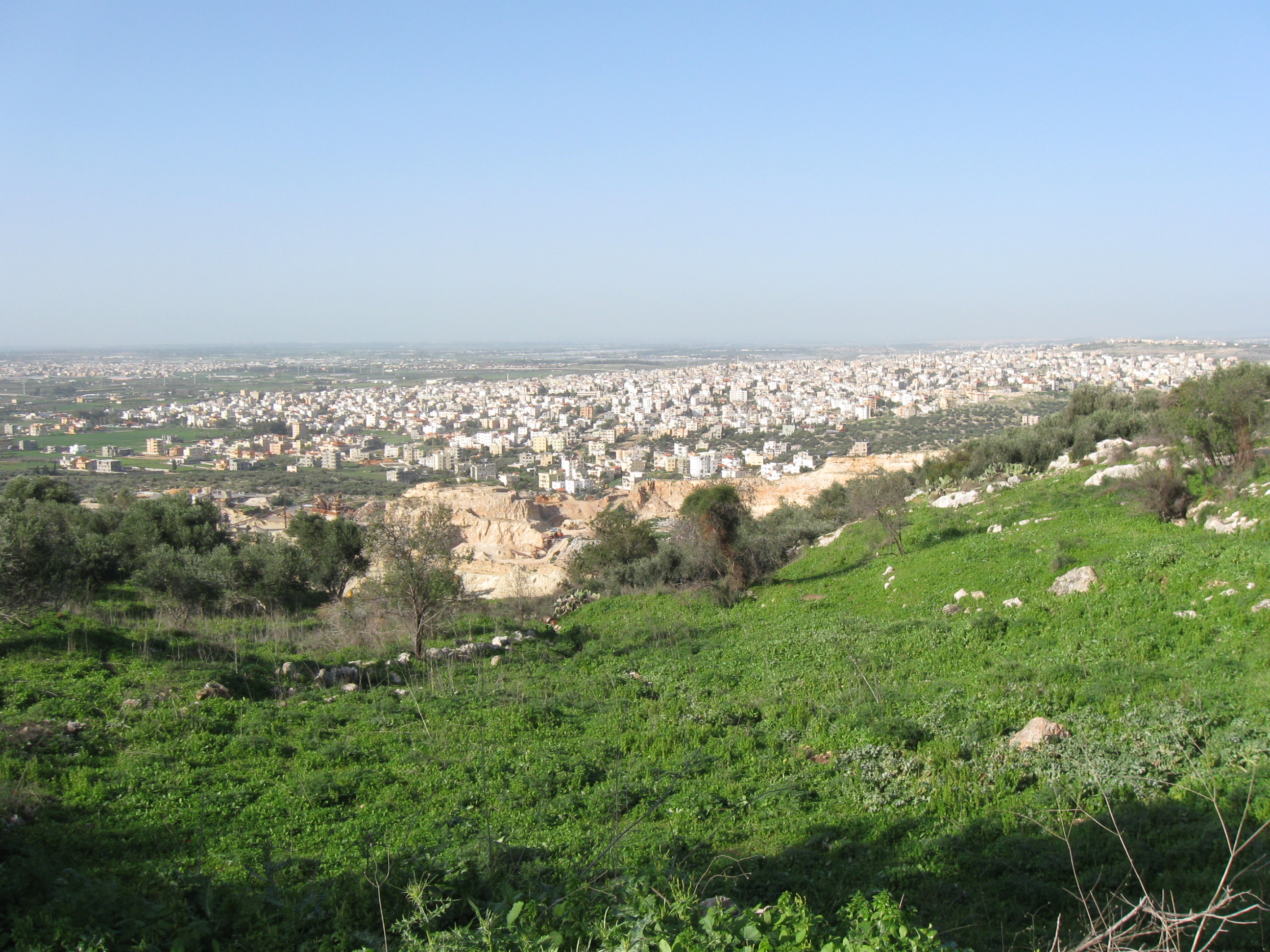
A view of Tayibe, the largest city of the Southern Triangle.

The Triangle (Hebrew: המשולש, HaMeshulash; Arabic: المثلث, al-Muthallath), formerly referred to as the Little Triangle, is a concentration of Israeli Arab towns and villages along the Green Line border of the West Bank, located in the eastern Sharon plain among the Samarian foothills; this area is located within the easternmost boundaries of both the Central District and Haifa District. The eleven towns are home to approximately 250,000 Arab citizens of Israel, representing between 10 and 15% of Israel's Palestinian Arab population. Roughly 75 percent of the Arab-Israeli population of the Central District, and more than 60 percent of the Arab-Israeli population of the Haifa District, resides in the Triangle.

The Triangle is further divided into the "Northern Triangle" or Wadi Ara (around Kafr Qara, Ar'ara, Baqa al-Gharbiyye, Zemer and Umm al-Fahm) and the "Southern Triangle" (around Qalansawe, Tayibe, Kafr Qasim, Tira, Kafr Bara and Jaljulia). Umm al-Fahm and Tayibe are the social, cultural and economic centers for Arab residents of the region. The Triangle is a stronghold of the Islamic Movement in Israel. The current leader of the movement's northern faction, Raed Salah, is a former mayor of Umm al-Fahm.

== History and status ==
Prior to the 1948 Arab–Israeli War and Israel's establishment and sovereignty over the Kafr Qasim, Jaljulia and Kafr Bara area, it was referred to as the "Little Triangle".

The region was originally designated to fall under Jordanian jurisdiction, but while negotiating the 1949 Armistice Agreements, Israel insisted on having it within its side of the Green Line, for military and strategic reasons. To achieve this, a territorial swap was negotiated, ceding the Israeli territory in the southern hills of Hebron in exchange for the Triangle villages in Wadi Ara. The term was later expanded to include the entire area around Wadi Ara (the Northern Triangle of today) and the "Little" appendage quickly fell out of common use.

Populations as of 2024 are as follows:

- Umm al-Fahm: 60,209
- Tayibe: 46,870
- Baqa al-Gharbiyye: 31,275
- Ar'ara: 20,734
- Kafr Qasim: 27,996
- Qalansawe: 25,167
- Kafr Qara: 21,066
- Jaljulia: 10,992
- Zemer: 7,953
- Kafr Bara: 3,962

== Involuntary loss of citizenship ==
The concept of stripping the citizens of the area of their citizenship of Israel has been mooted. Several Israeli politicians have suggested the Triangle should be transferred to a future Palestinian state in exchange for Israel retaining control over settlements in the West Bank. The idea is a major part of the 2004 Lieberman Plan put forward by Yisrael Beiteinu leader Avigdor Lieberman but is largely opposed by Israeli Arabs. It is also a key feature of the 2020 Trump Israel–Palestine plan, which stated:

The Triangle Communities consist of Kafr Qara, Ar’ara, Baha al-Gharbiyye, Umm al Fahm, Qalansawe, Tayibe, Kafr Qasim, Tira, Kafr Bara and Jaljulia. These communities, which largely self-identify as Palestinian, were originally designated to fall under Jordanian control during the negotiations of the Armistice Line of 1949, but ultimately were retained by Israel for military reasons that have since been mitigated. The Vision contemplates the possibility, subject to agreement of the parties that the borders of Israel will be redrawn such that the Triangle Communities become part of the State of Palestine. In this agreement, the civil rights of the residents of the triangle communities would be subject to the applicable laws and judicial rulings of the relevant authorities.

In a July 2000 survey conducted by Kul al-Arab among 1,000 residents of Umm al-Fahm, 83 percent of respondents opposed the idea of transferring their city to Palestinian jurisdiction.

== See also ==
- Arab localities in Israel
