= HaSharon Subdistrict =

Coordinates: 32.33°N 34.85°E

HaSharon Subdistrict נפת השרון قضاء هشارون
- Subdistrict
- Central District in blue, with HaSharon Subdistrict in dark blue
- Interactive map of HaSharon Subdistrict
- Country: Israel
- District: Central

Area
  - Total: 348 km^{2} (134 sq mi)

Population (2024)
  - Total: 516,481

Ethnicity
  - Jews and others: 76.5%
  - Arabs: 20.9%

The HaSharon Subdistrict is one of Israel's subdistricts in the Central District. The principal city of this subdistrict is Netanya. The subdistrict is situated in the Sharon plain, a section of Israel's coastal plain, from which it draws its name.

== History ==
The subdistrict is mostly composed of what had been, during British-ruled Mandatory Palestine, the Tulkarm Subdistrict. The rest of Mandatory Tulkarm Subdistrict east of the Green Line constitutes the current Tulkarm Governorate.

== Demographics ==
Historical population
Year	Pop.	±%
1972	140,100	—
1983	182,500	+30.3%
1995	264,400	+44.9%
2008	387,940	+46.7%
2022	496,206	+27.9%
2024	516,481	+4.1%

== Administrative local authorities ==
Cities	Local Councils	Regional Councils
Kfar Yona; Netanya; Qalansawe; Tayibe; Tira	Elyakhin; Even Yehuda; Kadima-Tzoran; Pardesiya; Tel Mond; Zemer	Hefer Valley (Emek Hefer); Hof HaSharon; Lev HaSharon

== Voting Patterns ==
In the 2022 election, 42 percent of voters in the subdistrict voted for the parties of the center-left coalition led by Yair Lapid, while 41 percent voted for the parties of the right-wing coalition led by Benjamin Netanyahu and 17 percent voted for the Arab parties.

In the 2026 election, 40 percent of voters in the subdistrict voted for the parties of the center-left coalition led by Gadi Eisenkot, while 35 percent voted for the parties of the right-wing coalition led by Benjamin Netanyahu and 21 percent voted for the Arab parties. An additional 2.9 percent voted for the Reservists, and 1.4 percent voted for Amcha Yisrael. Voter turnout increased 22 percent from the 2022 election.

== Natural Regions ==
Districts, Subdistricts and Natural Regions of the State of Israel, 2018

- 411 Western Sharon
  - Population (2024): 391,559
  - Largest city: Netanya
- 412 Eastern Sharon
  - Population (2024): 124,922
  - Largest city: Tayibe
