= Central District (Israel) =

District of Israel

Coordinates: 31°56′N 34°52′E

- District of Israel

transcription(s)
  - Hebrew: מָחוֹז הַמֶרְכָּז
  - Arabic: المنطقة الوسطى
- Interactive map of Central District
- Cities: 22
- Local Councils: 18
- Regional Councils: 12
- Capital: Ramla
- Largest: Petah Tikva

Government
  - District Commissioner: Jonathan Bar-Siman-Tov

Area
  - Total: 1,293 km^{2} (499 sq mi)

Population (2024)
  - Total: 2,409,464
  - Density: 1,863/km^{2} (4,826/sq mi)
- ISO 3166 code: IL-M

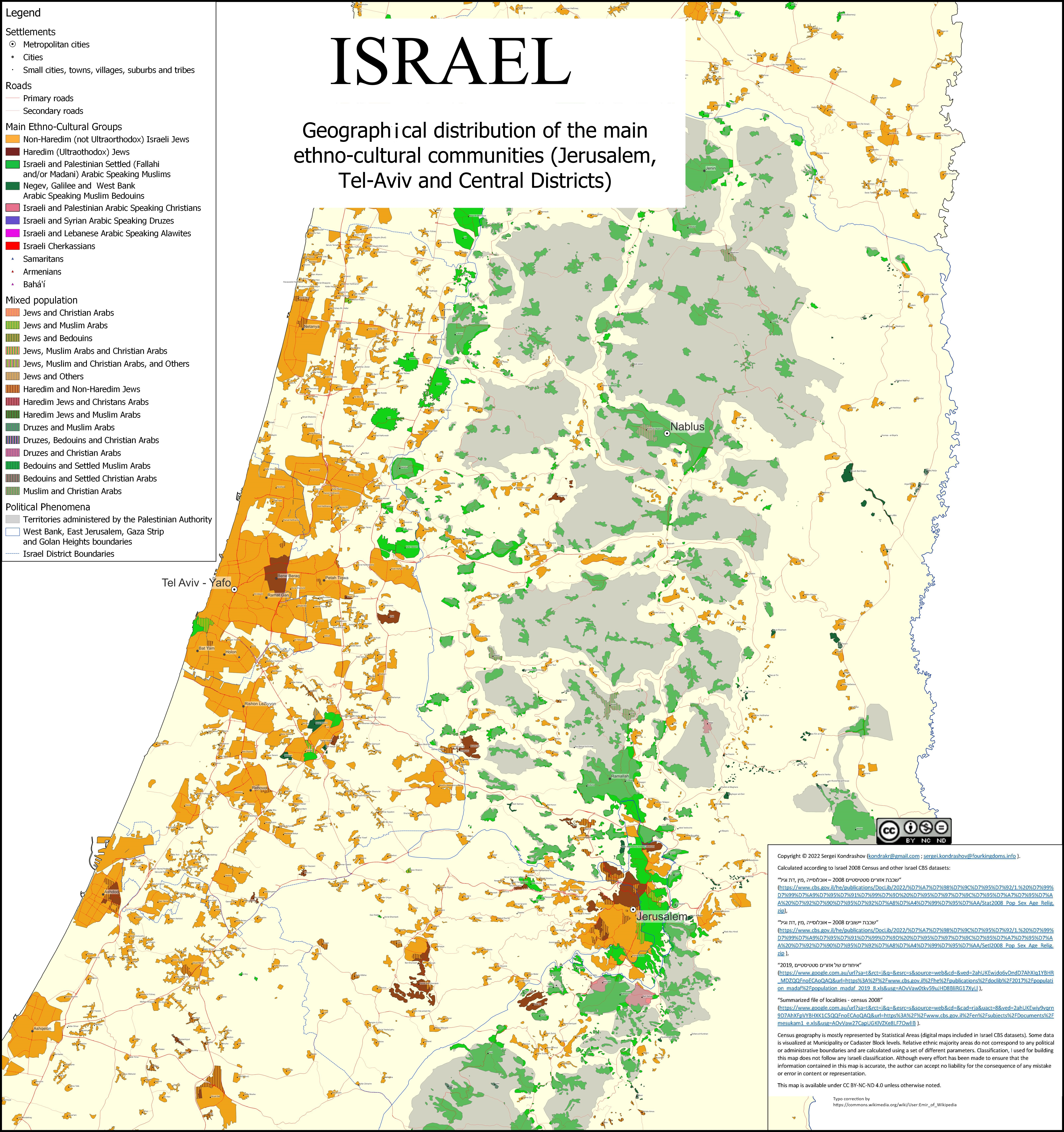
Geographical distribution of the main ethno-cultural communities Jerusalem, Tel-Aviv and Central districts

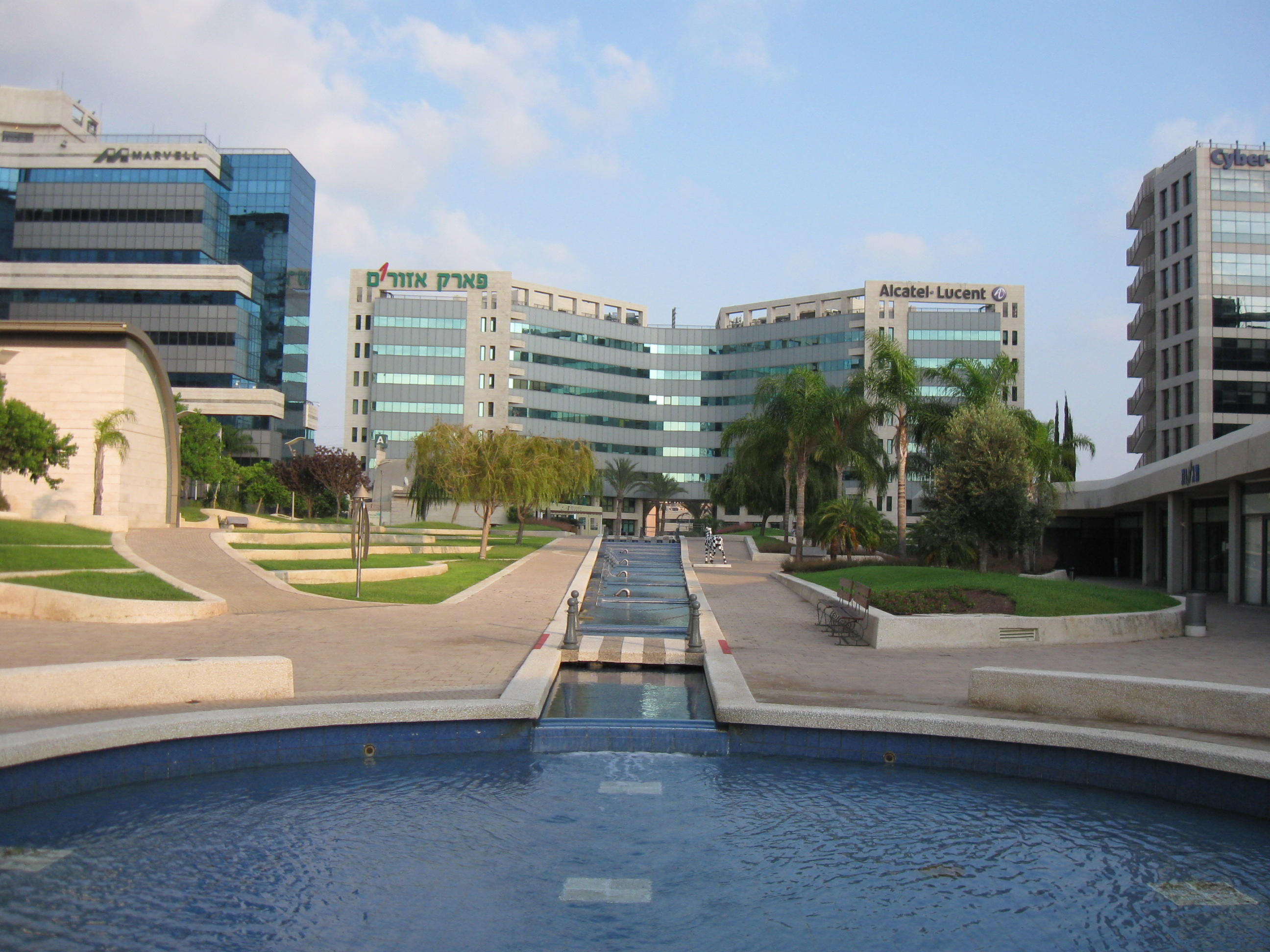
Petah Tikva, Central District

The Central District (Hebrew: מָחוֹז הַמֶרְכָּז, Meḥoz haMerkaz; Arabic: المنطقة الوسطى, Minṭaqat al-Wasaṭ) of Israel is one of six administrative districts, including most of the Sharon region. It is further divided into four sub-districts: Petah Tikva, Ramla, HaSharon, and Rehovot. The district's largest city is Rishon LeZion. The district's population as of 2024 was 2,409,464. According to the Israeli Central Bureau of Statistics, 89% of the population is Jewish, 8.4% is Arab, and the remainder are "non-classified", being mostly former Soviet Union immigrants of partial or nominal Jewish ethnic heritage or household members of Jews.

== Demographics ==
Historical population
Year	Pop.	±%
1972	570,700	—
1983	813,600	+42.6%
1995	1,171,900	+44.0%
2008	1,767,310	+50.8%
2022	2,317,025	+31.1%
2024	2,409,464	+4.0%

== Administrative local authorities ==
Subdistricts and Natural Regions
HaSharon (Natural regions: Eastern Sharon · Western Sharon); Petah Tikva (Natural regions: Petah Tikva · Southern Sharon); Ramla (Natural regions: Modi'in · Ramla); Rehovot (Natural regions: Rehovot · Rishon LeZion)
Cities	Local Councils	Regional Councils
Be'er Ya'akov; El'ad; Ganei Tikva; Giv'at Shmuel; Hod HaSharon; Kafr Qasim; Kfar Saba; Kfar Yona; Lod; Modi'in-Maccabim-Re'ut; Ness Ziona; Netanya; Petah Tikva; Qalansawe; Ra'anana; Ramla; Rehovot; Rishon LeZion; Rosh HaAyin; Tayibe; Tira; Yavne; Yehud-Monosson	Beit Dagan; Bnei Ayish; Elyakhin; Even Yehuda; Gan Yavne; Gedera; Jaljulia; Kadima-Tzoran; Kfar Bara; Kiryat Ekron; Kokhav Yair; Mazkeret Batya; Pardesiya; Savyon; Shoham; Tel Mond; Zemer	Brenner; Drom HaSharon; Gan Rave; Gederot; Gezer; Hefer Valley (Emek Hefer); Hevel Modi'in; Hevel Yavne; Hof HaSharon; Lev HaSharon; Nahal Sorek; Sdot Dan

=== Former municipalities ===
Former Municipalities
- Kadima (merged with Tzoran; now Kadima-Tzoran)
- Maccabim-Re'ut (merged with Modi'in; now Modi'in–Maccabim–Re'ut)
- Modi'in (merged with Maccabim-Re'ut; now Modi'in–Maccabim–Re'ut)
- Neve Monosson (merged with Yehud and declared an autonomous borough within Yehud–Monosson)
- Tzoran (merged with Kadima; now Kadima-Tzoran)
- Yehud (merged with Neve Monosson; now Yehud–Monosson)

== Economy ==
El Al Airlines maintains its corporate headquarters on the grounds of Ben Gurion Airport and in the Central District.

== See also ==
- Districts of Israel
- List of cities in Israel
