= God's Company (Israel) =

The 3rd company in the 33rd battalion, Alexandroni Brigade
- פלוגת האלוקים
- Brigade insignia
- Active: 1948 - 1948
- Country: Israel
- Allegiance: Israel Defense Forces
- Branch: Infantry
- Type: Reserves
- Size: Company
- Engagements: 1948 Arab–Israeli War

Commanders
- Notable commanders: Ben Zion Helman

1948 Arab–Israeli War – Faluja pocket
- Part of 1948 Palestine war
Date	27–28 December 1948
Location	Former British Mandate of Palestine, Faluja pocket
Result	Company lost, Egyptians hold their positions

God's Company is a nickname given to the C company in the 33rd battalion of the Alexandroni Brigade in the IDF, roughly 100 men, who were outflanked and destroyed (67 dead) by the Egyptian forces during attempting to conquer Faluja pocket (operation Hisul). They were led by Ben Zion Helman who refused an order to retreat, saying "I will not leave, until the last of the wounded is evacuated".". An Egyptian officer, Gamal Abdel Nasser, described their stand as courageous and said he understood it after learning they took a tefillin with them into battle. They were buried with a military funeral by the Egyptian forces (firing three times from a cannon).

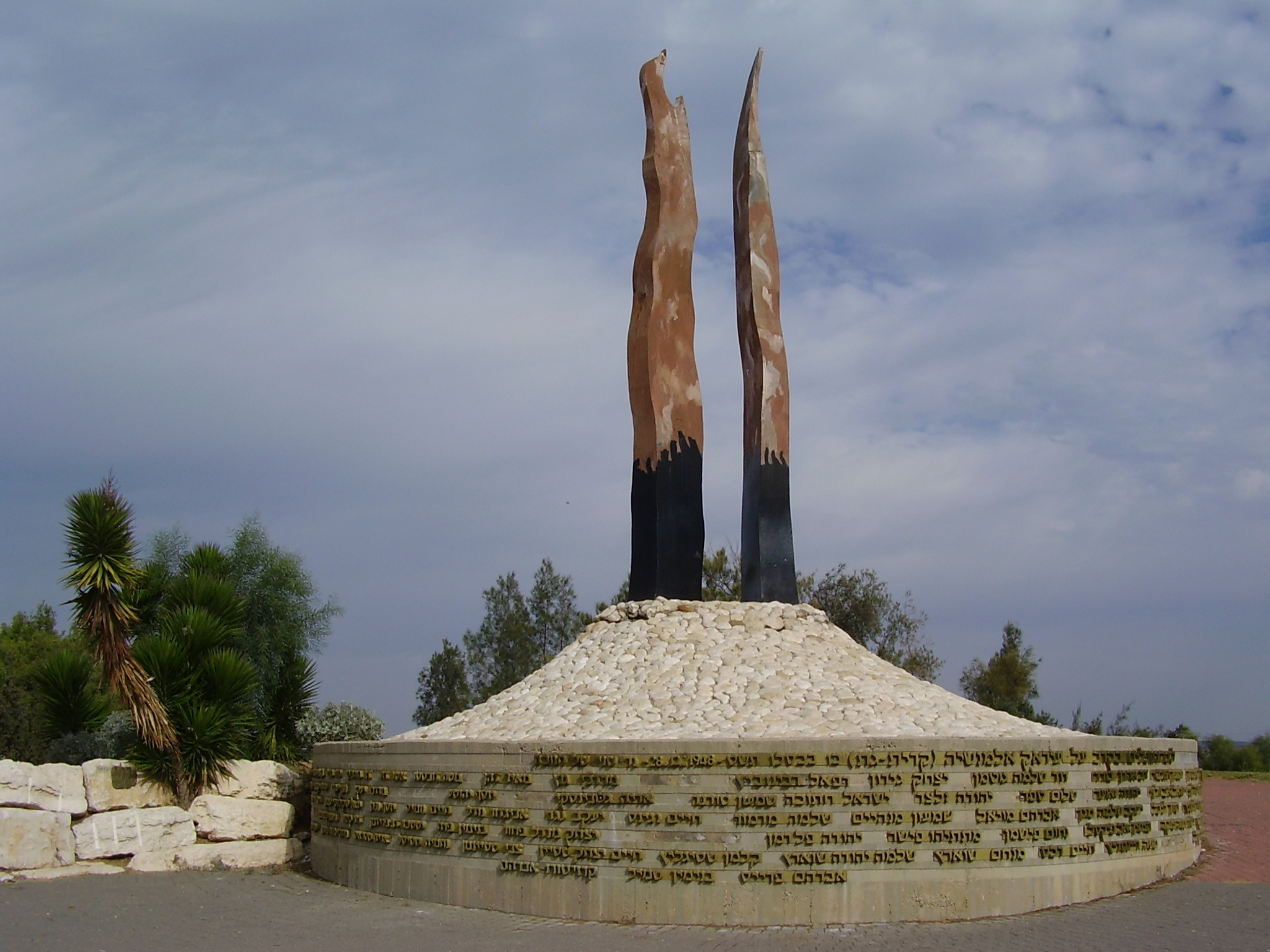
Kiryat Gat memorial for the fallen 67 soldiers of the God's company

== Etymology ==
One of the sources says that the company gained the nickname God's company when a high-ranking officer witnessed them praying before going to eat after returning from a day of a battle, another says it was nicknamed because they all survived many battles.

== Background ==
The company consisted of men from Bnei Brak, Ramat Gan, and Givatayim, and was one of the three religious platoons. The company included 20 Holocaust survivors with 5 being Netzer Aharon (last survivors in their family). During a week that they learned that there were no kosher dishes, they had been eating only brine fish and bread. Their actions and the Cooks affair (when the cooks had been order to make food on Shabbat) in July 1948 led to the order that IDF kitchens must be kosher.

== Battles ==
- The company was one of the companies that conquered what is today known as Tel HaShomer.
- Battle of Tantura.
- Attempt to conqueror Iraq al-Manshiyya in the Faluja pocket. The company orders had been to conqueror Tel Sheikh Ahmad Eirni (An Antiquities Tel), but during the battle an Egyptian force outflanked the company and destroyed it. The battle plan was for the company to take the Tel while the rest of the 33rd battalion would take over the village, while the 32nd battalion would provide support and a company from the 35th will close the path to the bridge. On the morning of the 28th the company charged the Tel while the Egyptian forces defended using machine guns and heavy artillery, The third company was not aware that due to muddy terrain (the previous two days had heavy rain) the 35th battalion was late in one hour and retreated back. An Egyptian armored machine with Bern machine guns had been able to pass and outflank the third company.

== Bodies exhumation ==
Following the failure to conquer Tel Erani north of Iraq al-Manshiyya during operation Hisul the bodies of the fallen soldiers had been buried in four mass graves by the Egyptian forces. Rabbi Goren had been sent to identify the burial site and exhumation. According to a report by Davar, the Rabbi received honorable military treatment from the Egyptian forces and the Egyptian forces assisted in the exhumation process.

== In popular culture ==
- During 2016, a Headstart project to fund a movie about the company had made. a Movie named "The story of the religious company" had been made.
- A memorial had been built in Kiryat Gat. A yearly ceremony is held in the city of Kiryat Gat to commemorate them.
- The Bnei Akiva youth movement designed a hiking trip to commemorate the fallen soldiers.

== See also ==
- Alexandroni Brigade
