= Head Start =

Head start or headstart may refer to:

- Head start (positioning), a lead in the position in which one starts
- Headstarting, a technique in nature conservation

== Other ==
- Head Start (program), an educational program of the United States Department of Health and Human Services
- Head Start (New Zealand), current restructuring of local government in New Zealand
- Head Start (TV series), an Australian television drama series that ran for forty episodes on the Australian Broadcasting Corporation in 2001
- News18 Headstart, an Indian television news show broadcast by CNN-News18
- Headstart (Philippine TV program) an morning news show broadcast by ABS-CBN News Channel
- Operation Head Start, a Cold War operation in which B-52 Stratofortress bombers were launched and placed on rotation off Greenland and Canada
- Headstart (web), an Israeli crowdfunding site for entrepreneurs
- Vendex HeadStart, a series of PC compatible computers sold by Philips Computers

== See also ==
- Law of the handicap of a head start, a theory that suggests that getting an initial head start in a given area may result in being a handicap in the long-term
