= Ometz =

Ometz may refer to:

- Ometz, Israel, a moshav in central Israel
- Ometz (political party), a defunct Israeli political party
