= Qaqun =

Qaqun قاقون Quaquo, Caco, Chaco, Kâkôn, Kakoun
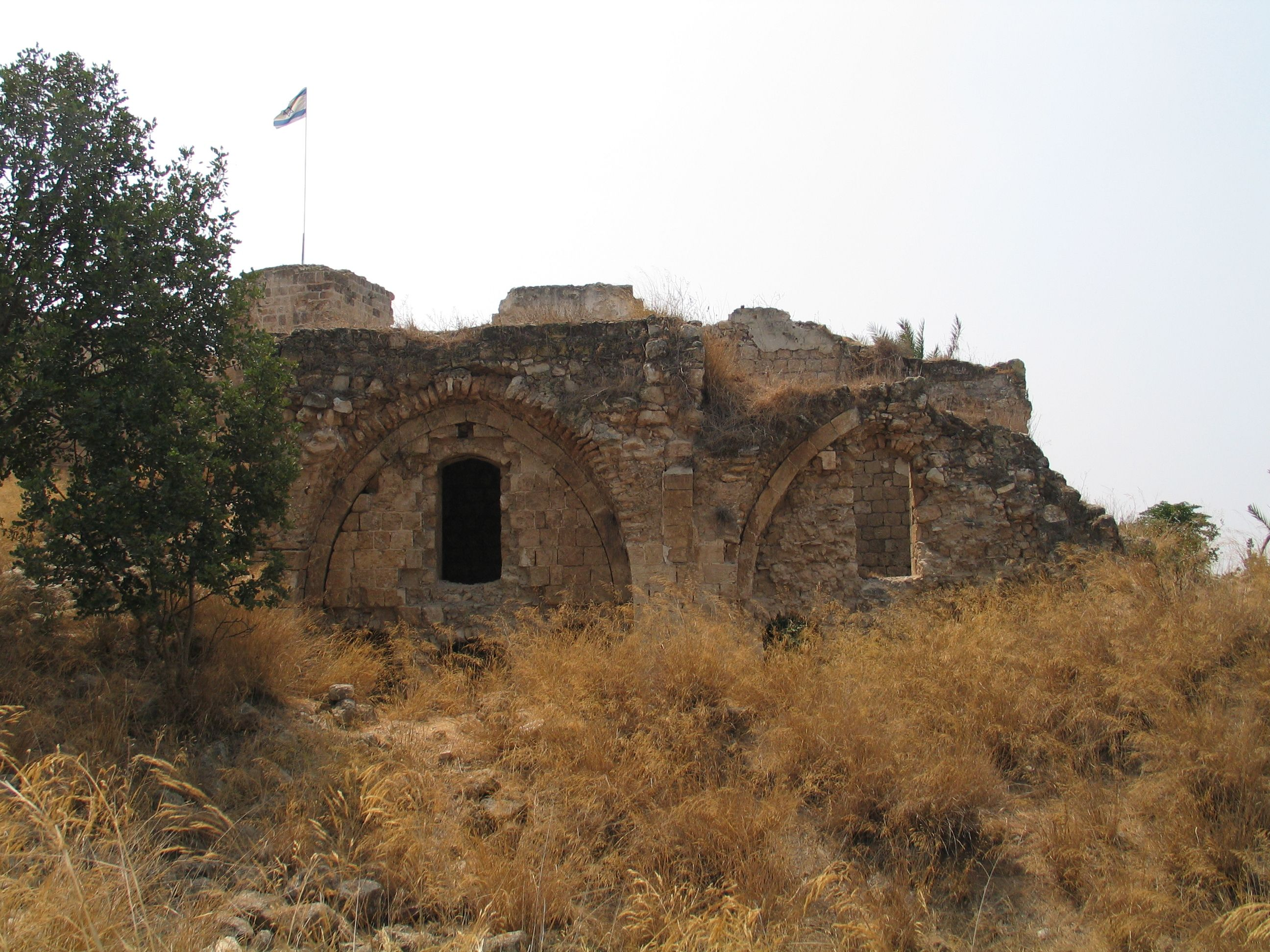
- In the Crusader period, a castle called Caco or Cacho stood here, of which an 8.5m tower survives.
- Etymology: from personal name
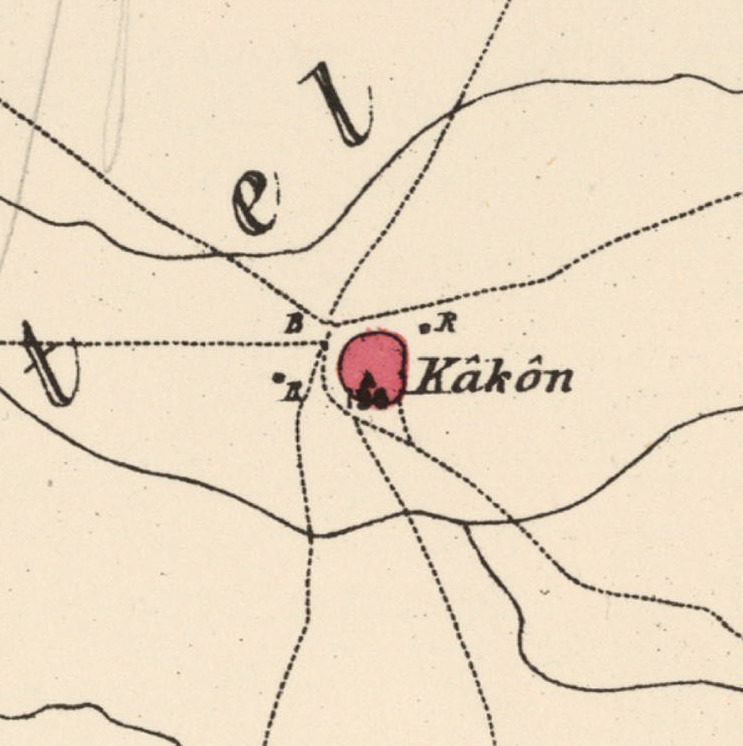
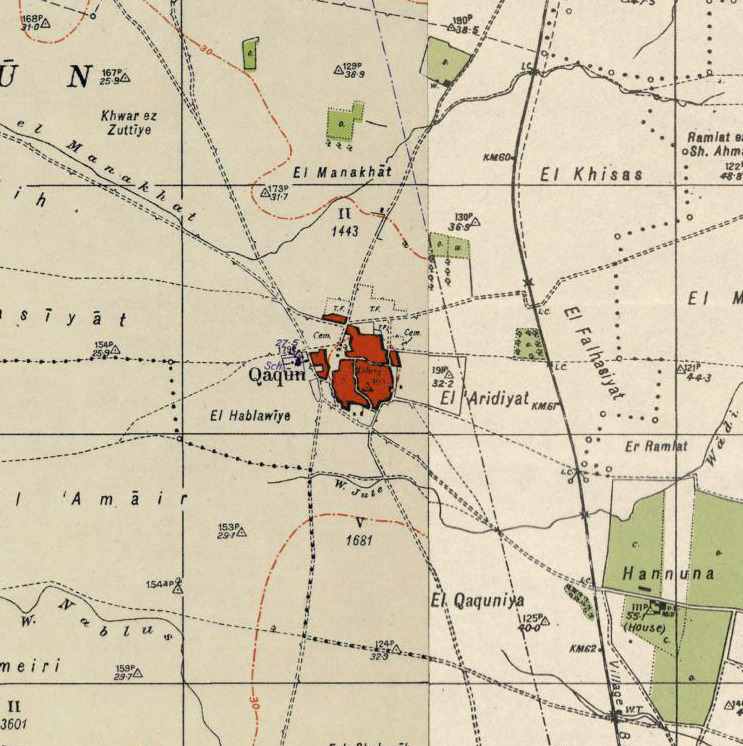
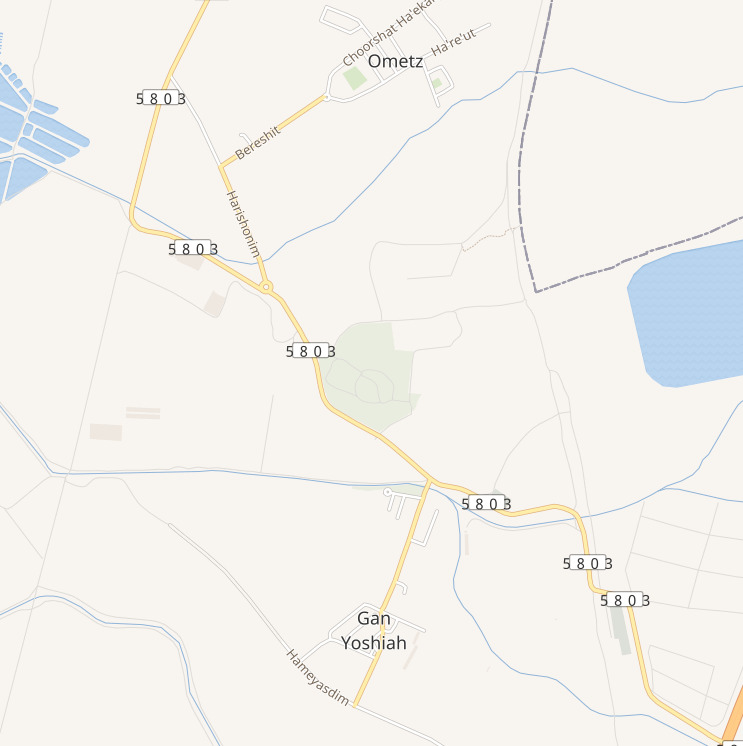
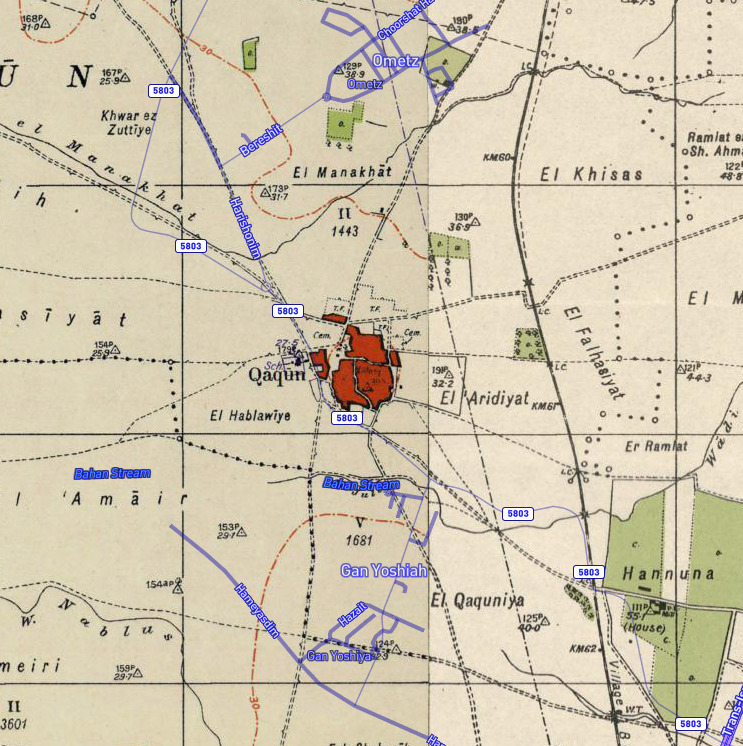
- 1870s map 1940s map modern map 1940s with modern overlay map

- Location within Mandatory Palestine
- Coordinates: 32°21′36″N 34°59′43″E
- Palestine grid: 149/196
- Geopolitical entity: Mandatory Palestine
- Subdistrict: Tulkarm
- Date of depopulation: 5 June 1948

Area
  - Total: 41,767 dunams (41.767 km^{2}; 16.126 sq mi)

Population (1945)
  - Total: 1,970
- Cause(s) of depopulation: Military assault by Yishuv forces
- Current Localities: HaMa'apil, Gan Yoshiya, Ometz, ´Olesh, Haniel, Yikon

Qaqun (Arabic: قاقون) was a Palestinian Arab village located 6 kilometers (3.7 mi) northwest of the city of Tulkarm at the only entrance to Mount Nablus from the coastal Sharon plain. Its former territory falls now within Israel's Hefer Valley Regional Council.

Evidence of organized settlement in Qaqun dates back to the period of Assyrian rule in the region. Ruins of a Crusader and Mamluk castle still stand at the site. Qaqun was continuously inhabited by Arabs since at least as early as the Mamluk period and was depopulated during a military operation by Israeli forces during the 1948 Arab-Israeli war, after Iraqi troops used the town as a base for operations.

The modern village was built around a Crusader fort as its core.

== Etymology ==
While the site is an ancient one, the current name, Qāqūn is an Aramaic one, meaning “little pelican”. In the Crusader period it was variously transcribed as Caco, Caccho among other forms. Some 17th century Ottoman documents have another variant, Qāqūm (قاقوم).

== History ==
=== Ancient and classical ===
Assyrian artifacts have been discovered in Qaqun. Among these are fragments of stelae recording the victory of Sargon II over the Philistine city-states in the 8th century BC, providing evidence of the establishment of Assyrian rule in Palestine.

In the 1st century AD, Antipas, like others close to the Herodians who ruled over parts of the region at the time, was granted dominion over large areas of land. One of the gifts (doreai) he received was a parcel of land located in the Plain of Sharon which included Qaqun, among other villages.

=== Crusader period ===
In the Crusader period, a castle called Caco or Cacho stood here, of which an 8.5m tower survives. In 1160, Benjamin of Tudela visited Qaqun which he identified as being ancient Keilah. It was mentioned in 1253 when it apparently still was held by the lord of Caesarea, John Aleman.

In 1271, Lord Edward of England launched a large raid during the Ninth Crusade with the support of the Templar, Hospitaller, and Teutonic Knights on the town of Qaqun, in which he surprised a large force of Turcomans (mostly itinerant herdsmen), reportedly killing 1,500 of them and taking 5,000 animals as booty. These Turcomans were likely relatively new additions to Baibars' army, being integrated in 1268 and given horses, titles, and lands in return for military service after the Turkmen migrations following the Mongol invasions.

=== Mamluk period ===
Qaqun was captured by the Mamluk sultan Baibars (1259–1277) in 1267. Under Mamluk rule, Qaqun was the capital of one of six districts that made up the province of as-Sham, the Mamluk administrative unit for a part of the governorship of "Mamlakat Gaza", one of the region's three Mamluk administrative governorships, the other two being "Mamlakat Dimashq" (Damascus) and "Mamlakat Zafad" (Safed). Qaqun and also Lydda appeared to be independent provinces later in this period. Baybars had ordered its fortress rebuilt and had its church renovated and made into a mosque. Its markets were re-established, and it soon became a commercial center with a caravanserai for merchants, travelers, and their animals. While early scholarship often attributed the construction of the fortress to Crusaders, both the fortress and mosque at Qaqun are now thought to have built during the reign of Baybars, who also built the administrative center and large market there.

In December 1271, as Baybars was battling the Mongols in Aleppo, the Crusader forces of King Edward raided Qaqun, but were quickly fought back by the forces of the Mamluk emirs. However the near contemporary Egyptian historian Ibn al-Furat wrote that Edward’s raid may have been a little more troublesome, he wrote:

“At the end of the month of Rabi' II, the month already mentioned (4 December 1271), the Sultan learnt that the Franks had attacked Qaqun (Caco); the emir Husam al-Din, the ustadh-dar, had been killed and the emir Rukn al-Din al-Jaliq wounded; while the governor of the place had had to leave.”

At the end of the 13th century, the Via Maris was moved eastward inland to improve the line of defence since Palestine's coastal cities were the first to fall to competing powers seeking to expand their domain. The route followed the coast of the Sinai, passing through Al-Arish, Rafah, Khan Yunis, and Gaza. There, a branch then turned eastward to Jerusalem, onto Hebron while another passed through Beit Hanoun to Ramlah through Daris and continued north to Lydda, through Jaljulia and Tira to the center of Qaqun. From Qaqun, the route branched into two, one leading to Jenin and the other to Wadi Ara. Many of these places were villages that had khans built there in the 14th century. The khan in Qaqun was built on the orders of Mamluk governor Sanjar al-Jawli in 1315, and under Mamluk rule, khans like the one in Qaqun were used by couriers on horseback, forming part of the postal network on the Gaza-Damascus road. Al-Qalqashandi (d .1418) mentioned Qaqun as a pleasant, though not particularly prosperous town, with a mosque, a bath, a handsome fort, and wells.

=== Ottoman period ===
During early Ottoman rule in Palestine, the revenues of the village of Qaqun were in 1557 designated for the new waqf of Hasseki Sultan Imaret in Jerusalem, established by Hasseki Hurrem Sultan (Roxelana), the wife of Suleiman the Magnificent. By 1596, Qaqun was the center of the nahiya (subdistrict) of Qaqun under Nablus Sanjak with a population of 19 households and 4 bachelors; an estimated 127 persons; all Muslim. They paid a fixed tax rate of 25% on a number of crops, including wheat and barley, as well as on goats and beehives; a total of 16,590 akçe. Qaqun continued to function as an important stop on the Cairo-Damascus road.

During Napoleon's campaign in 1799, the French forces defeated the Ottoman troops who had been sent to Qaqun to stop their advance towards Acre. Pierre Jacotin named the village Qaqoun on his map from the same campaign.

In the 1830s, the inhabitants of Qanqun participated in the revolt against Egypt, and it was thence destroyed by the army of Ibrahim Pasha of Egypt during his Syrian campaign (1832–1840). In 1838 it was noted as a village, Kakon, in the western Esh-Sha'rawiyeh administrative region, north of Nablus.

In the late 19th century, Qaqun was described as a large village built around the central tower of the Crusader/Mamluk fort. Its houses, built of stone and mud, were dispersed over the surface of a hill. There was arable land in the surrounding area. Claude R. Conder writes to have seen a Crusader-era tower in Qaqun during his visit there.

=== British Mandate ===
In the 1922 census of Palestine there were 1,629 villagers, 29 Christian males, and the rest Muslim, decreasing in the 1931 census to a population of 1367 Muslims, in a total of 260 houses.

In the 1945 statistics the population of Qaqun was 1,916, all Muslims, with a total of 41,767 dunams of land according to an official land and population survey. Of this, Arabs used a total of 713 dunums for citrus and bananas, while 34,376 dunums were allocated to cereals; 210 additional dunums were irrigated or used for orchards, of which 80 dunums were planted with olive trees, while 137 dunams were built-up (urban) land.

Just prior to the 1948 war, in addition to the mosque and fortress, Qaqun also housed an elementary school for boys and hundreds of homes for its more than 2,000 inhabitants. The village families were made up of the Abu-Hantash, Zidan, al-Shaykh Ghanem, Matrouk, and al-Hafi clans.

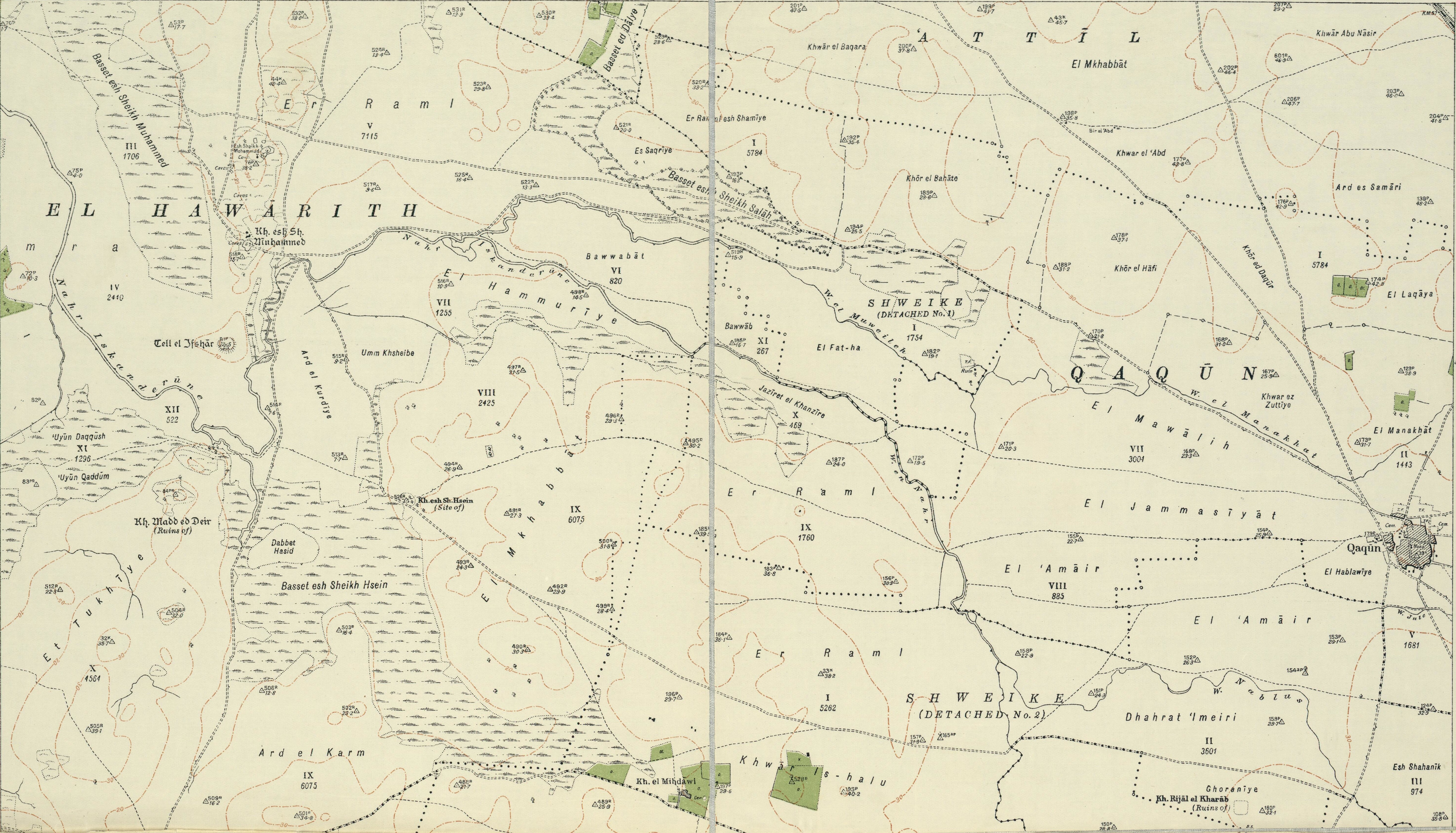
Qaqun 1930 1:20,000

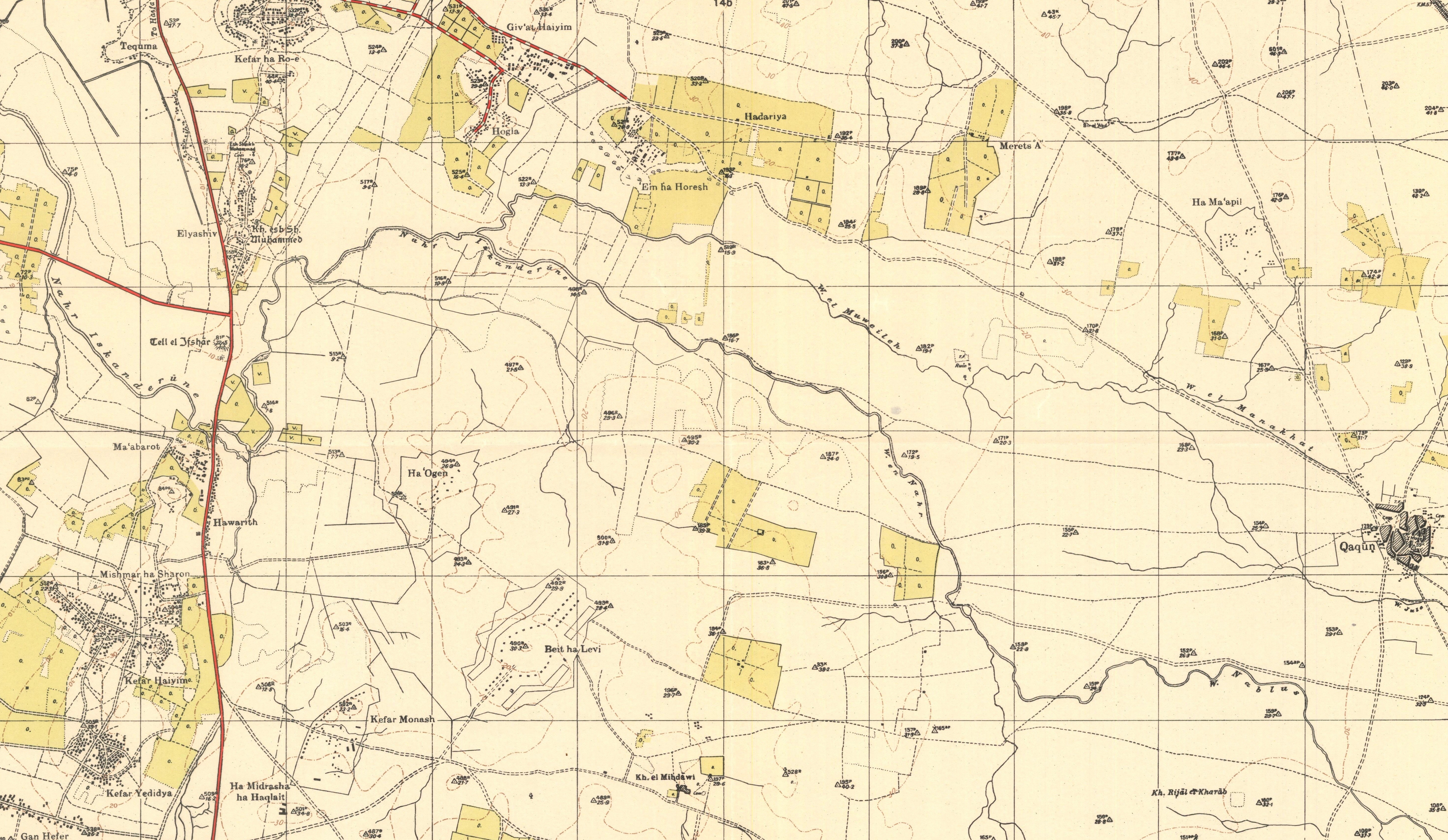
Qaqun 1939 1:20,000

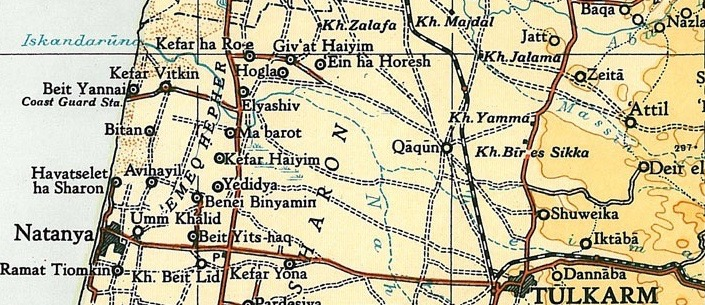
Qaqun 1945 1:250,000

=== 1948 War ===
Battle of Qaqun
- Part of 1948 Arab-Israeli War
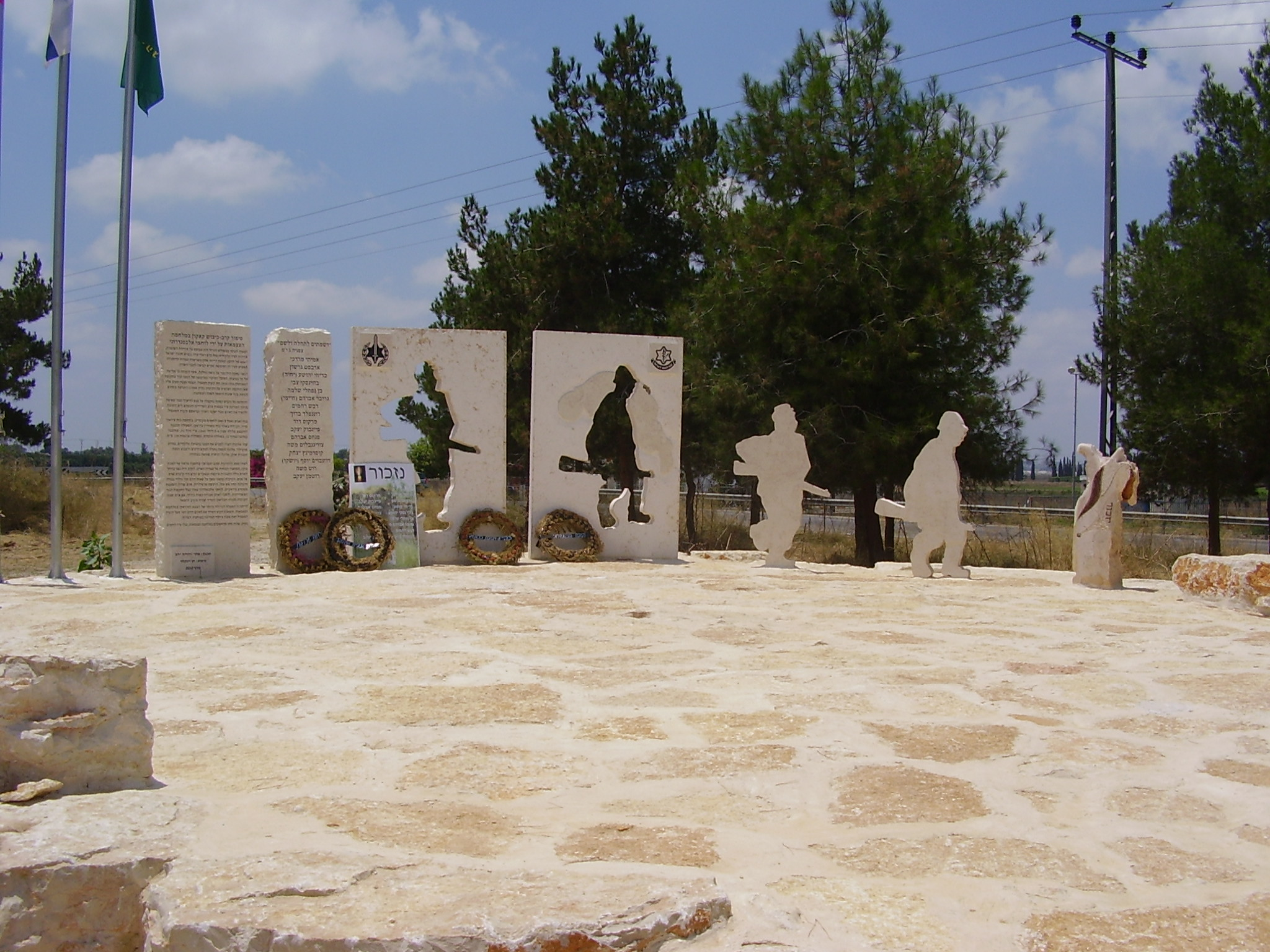
- War Memorial of Alexandroni Brigade in Qaqun with Bible citation from Zephaniah 3:19
Date	June 4–5, 1948
Location	Israel
Result	Israeli victory

Belligerents
(Israel) IDF (Alexandroni Brigade)	Iraq, Arab irregulars

Commanders and leaders
(Israel) Col. Dan Even (Alexandroni Brigade) (Israel) Ben Zion Ziv (33rd Battalion)	

Strength
Reinforced battalion	Iraqi regulars, 200 irregulars

Casualties and losses
16	

Qaqun was the victim of a "hit-and-run" raid carried out by the Irgun Zvai Leumi on 6 March 1948, according to the History of the Haganah. No further details are provided by this source, but the Palestinian newspaper Filastin reported an attack on the morning of 7 March. Quoting a communiqué issued by Palestinian militia forces, the paper said that the large attacking unit failed to penetrate the village, and that it threw a number of grenades which wounded two women.

On 9 May 1948 the Alexandroni Arab affairs experts decided on a meeting in Netanya, in preparation for the declaration of Israeli statehood and the expected pan-Arab invasion, to immediately "expel or subdue" the inhabitants of the Palestinian villages of Kafr Saba, al Tira, Qaqun, Qalansuwa, and Tantura. The final operational order did not say what was to be done with the inhabitants, but repeatedly spoke of "cleaning" or "clearing" the village.

After the establishment of the State of Israel and the outbreak of the 1948 Arab–Israeli War, regular Iraqi forces entrenched in the Triangle region threatened to cut Israeli-controlled territory in half by capturing Netanya. An Iraqi attack was repelled on 29 May 1948, when Israeli forces successfully defended the villages Ein Vered, Kfar Yabetz and Geulim. Arab attacks originated in Ras al-Ein, Tira, Qalansawe and Qaqun, and the capture of any of these was deemed likely to bring to an end the Iraqi effort in the Netanya area.

Qaqun was chosen as the target of an Israeli offensive, and on 5 June at 04:00, the 33rd Battalion of the Alexandroni Brigade attacked the village. A frontal assault was conducted on the Iraqi headquarters to the north of the village, after the nearby mill was cleared. The Israel Defense Forces were only able to clear the village during the day, and used reinforcements from the 32nd Battalion at Ein HaHoresh, which flanked the Arab forces from the south. Iraqi counter-attacks from Kalansawe and Tulkarem lasted until nightfall, with both sides bombing each other's positions from the air. Israeli forces were able to hold on to the village and put an end to Iraqi advances on the coastal plain. Alexandroni suffered 16 casualties and by their estimate the entire Iraqi battalion was wiped out. According to the Alexandroni memorial website, the Iraqi defeat in the battle is considered its biggest of the war.

However, according to Benny Morris, the attack was preceded by an artillery barrage that precipitated the evacuation of most of Qaqun's inhabitants to nearby groves. And only a few local militiamen and several dozen Iraqi Army soldiers remained to fight and they were rapidly overwhelmed by the Alexandroni infantry.

Two days later, on 7 June, Joseph Weitz noted Qaqun among the villages which they had to decide as to whether destroy (to prevent the villagers from returning), or renovate and settle with Jews. By December 1948 the IDF General Staff\Operations approved the depopulation of the remaining small border-hugging sites ("khurab") in the Triangle area. It was instructed that "an effort should be made to carry out the eviction [of Arab civilians] without force". But if force proved necessary, the Military Government was authorized to use it. Among the sites evicted was eight in the Qaqun and Gharbiya area.

=== After 1948 ===
Kibbutz ha-Ma´pil was built on what had traditionally been village land in 1945, 3 km to the northwest. Three settlements were founded on village land in 1949: Gan Yoshiyya, 1 km due south of the village site, Ometz, 1 km north of the site; and ´Olesh, 4 km southwest of the site. Haniel was built on village land in 1950. Yikkon was built in the early 1950s to serve as a transit camp for new Jewish immigrants, and was later made into a regional school. Burgeta, built in 1949, is 5 km to the southwest but is not on village land.

Walid Khalidi described the remaining structures of the village in 1992:

The fortress on top of the hill, a well that belonged to the family of Abu Hantash, and the school building are all that remain of the village. The fortress is surrounded by stone rubble and the remains of houses, and the school building is still used as a school by Israelis. Cactuses and an old mulberry tree grow south of the hill. The surrounding lands are covered by orchards. In addition, cotton, pistachios, and vegetables are grown on the lands. There is an Israeli fodder-processing factory northeast of the village site.

The estimated number of Palestinian refugees from Qaqun, as of 1998, was 14,034. This figure includes descendants of the original refugees.

The Nature and Parks Authority and the Hefer Valley Economic Development Corporation recently ordered that the former site of Qaqun, its fortress and other ruins be declared a national park. The plan is to rehabilitate the site and turn it into a "focal point that will draw tourism."

== See also ==
- Depopulated Palestinian locations in Israel
- List of villages depopulated during the Arab-Israeli conflict

== Bibliography ==
- Amitai-Preiss, Reuven (2005). Mongols and Mamluks. Cambridge University Press.
- Barron, J.B., ed. (1923). Palestine: Report and General Abstracts of the Census of 1922. Government of Palestine.
- Benvenisti, M. (2000). Sacred Landscape: The Buried History of the Holy Land Since 1948. University of California Press. ISBN 978-0-520-23422-2.
- Conder, C.R.; Kitchener, H.H. (1882). The Survey of Western Palestine: Memoirs of the Topography, Orography, Hydrography, and Archaeology. Vol. 2. London: Committee of the Palestine Exploration Fund.
- Conder, C.R. (2002). Tent Work in Palestine: A Record of Discovery and Adventure. Adamant Media Corporation. ISBN 978-1-4021-8987-6.
- Government of Palestine, Department of Statistics (1945). Village Statistics, April, 1945.
- Guérin, V. (1875). Description Géographique Historique et Archéologique de la Palestine (in French). Vol. 2: Samarie, pt. 2. Paris: L'Imprimerie Nationale.
- Keel, Othmar; Uehlinger, Christoph; Trapp, Thomas H. (1998). Gods, Goddesses, and Images of God in Ancient Israel (Illustrated ed.). Continuum International Publishing Group. ISBN 978-0-567-08591-7.
- Khalidi, W. (1992). All That Remains: The Palestinian Villages Occupied and Depopulated by Israel in 1948. Washington D.C.: Institute for Palestine Studies. ISBN 0-88728-224-5.
- Hadawi, S. (1970). Village Statistics of 1945: A Classification of Land and Area ownership in Palestine. Palestine Liberation Organization Research Center.
- Hütteroth, W.-D.; Abdulfattah, K. (1977). Historical Geography of Palestine, Transjordan and Southern Syria in the Late 16th Century. Erlanger geographische Arbeiten. Vol. Sonderband 5. Erlangen, Germany: Vorstand der Fränkischen Geographischen Gesellschaft. ISBN 3-920405-41-2.
- Karmon, Y. (1960). "An Analysis of Jacotin's Map of Palestine" (PDF). Israel Exploration Journal. 10 (3, 4): 155–173, 244–253. Archived from the original (PDF) on 22 December 2019.
- Khalidi, W. (1992). All That Remains: The Palestinian Villages Occupied and Depopulated by Israel in 1948. Washington D.C.: Institute for Palestine Studies. ISBN 0-88728-224-5.
- Marshall, Christopher (1994). Warfare in the Latin East, 1192-1291. Cambridge University Press.
- Mills, E., ed. (1932). Census of Palestine 1931. Population of Villages, Towns and Administrative Areas. Jerusalem: Government of Palestine.
- Morris, B. (2004). The Birth of the Palestinian Refugee Problem Revisited. Cambridge University Press. ISBN 978-0-521-00967-6.
- Palmer, E.H. (1881). The Survey of Western Palestine: Arabic and English Name Lists Collected During the Survey by Lieutenants Conder and Kitchener, R. E. Transliterated and Explained by E.H. Palmer. Committee of the Palestine Exploration Fund.
- Petersen, Andrew (2001). A Gazetteer of Buildings in Muslim Palestine (British Academy Monographs in Archaeology). Vol. I. Oxford University Press. pp. 251−252. ISBN 978-0-19-727011-0. Archived from the original on 28 May 2021.
- Pringle, D. (1997). Secular buildings in the Crusader Kingdom of Jerusalem: an archaeological Gazetter. Cambridge University Press. ISBN 0521-46010-7.
- Pringle, D. (1998). The Churches of the Crusader Kingdom of Jerusalem: L-Z (excluding Tyre). Vol. II. Cambridge University Press. pp. 164-165. ISBN 0-521-39037-0.
- Robinson, E.; Smith, E. (1841). Biblical Researches in Palestine, Mount Sinai and Arabia Petraea: A Journal of Travels in the year 1838. Vol. 3. Boston: Crocker & Brewster.
- Röhricht, R. (1893). (RRH) Regesta regni Hierosolymitani (MXCVII-MCCXCI) (in Latin). Berlin: Libraria Academica Wageriana.
- Sartre, M.; Porter, Catherine; Rawlings, Elizabeth (2005). The Middle East under Rome (Illustrated ed.). Harvard University Press. ISBN 978-0-674-01683-5.
- Sharon, M. (1999). Corpus Inscriptionum Arabicarum Palaestinae, B-C. Vol. 2. BRILL. ISBN 90-04-11083-6.
- Singer, A. (2002). Constructing Ottoman Beneficence: An Imperial Soup Kitchen in Jerusalem. Albany: State University of New York Press. ISBN 0-7914-5352-9.
