= Gan Yoshiya =

Moshav in central Israel

Gan Yoshiya: גַּן יֹאשִׁיָּה (Hebrew); جان يوشيا (Arabic)
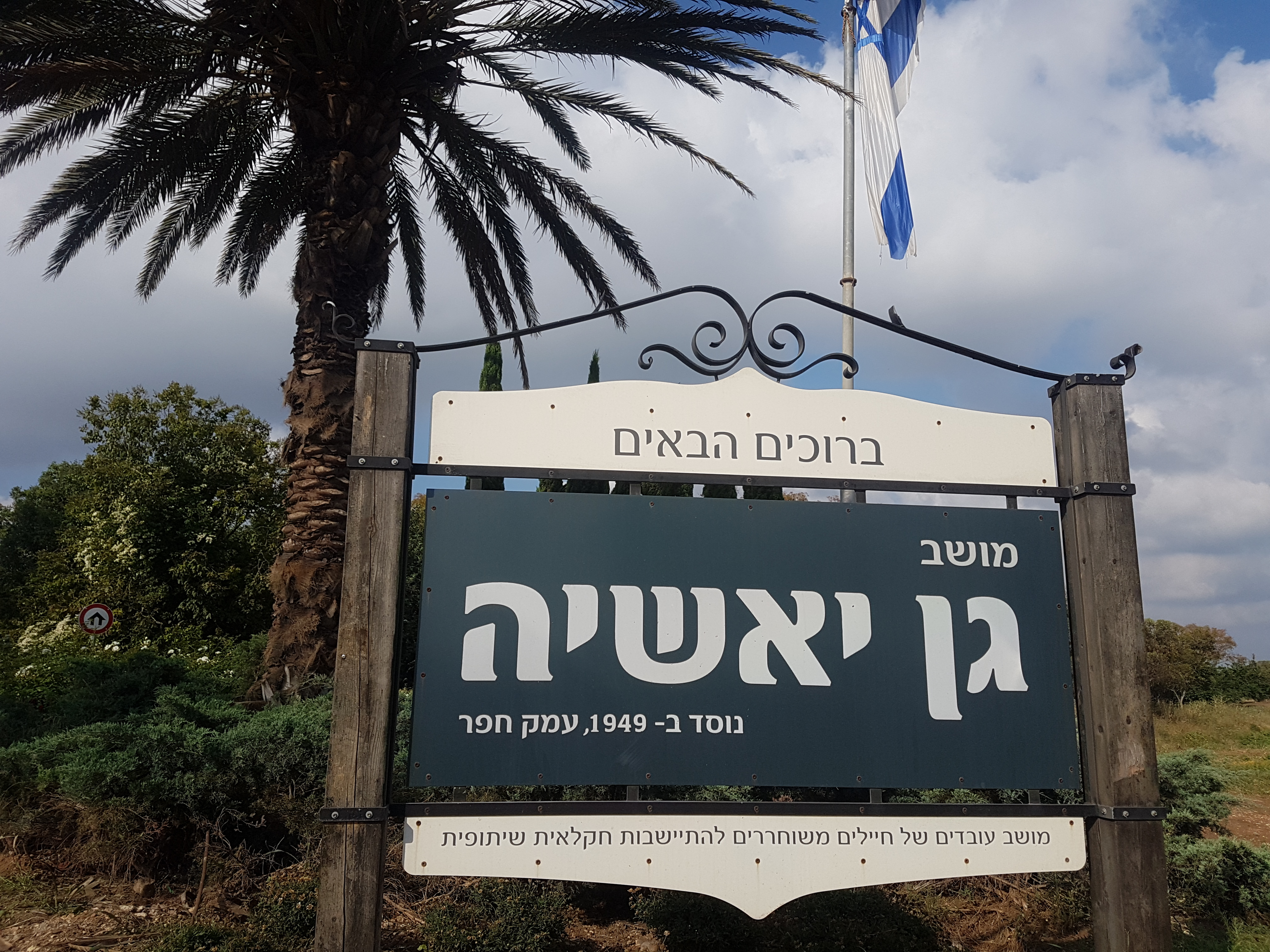

- Location within Central Israel
- Coordinates: 32°20′58″N 34°59′42″E
- Country: Israel
- District: Central
- Subdistrict: HaSharon
- Council: Hefer Valley
- Affiliation: Moshavim Movement
- Founded: 6 December 1949
- Founder: Demobilised Palmach soldiers Romanian Jews
- Population (2024): 990
- Website: www.ganyoshiya.com

Gan Yoshiya (Hebrew: גַּן יֹאשִׁיָּה, lit. Josiah's Garden) is a moshav in central Israel. Located near the Green Line in the Tulkarm area, it falls under the jurisdiction of Hefer Valley Regional Council. In 2024 it had a population of 990.

== History ==
The moshav was founded on 6 December 1949 on land near the depopulated Palestinian village of Qaqun by demobilised Palmach soldiers and Jewish immigrants from Romania. It was initially named Nahal Reuven after Nabi Rubin, before being later renamed in honour of Josiah Wedgwood.

== Notable residents ==
- Ben Saraf (born 2006), basketball player
