= HaMa'apil =

Moshav in central Israel

HaMa'apil: הַמַּעְפִּיל (Hebrew); هماعفيل (Arabic)
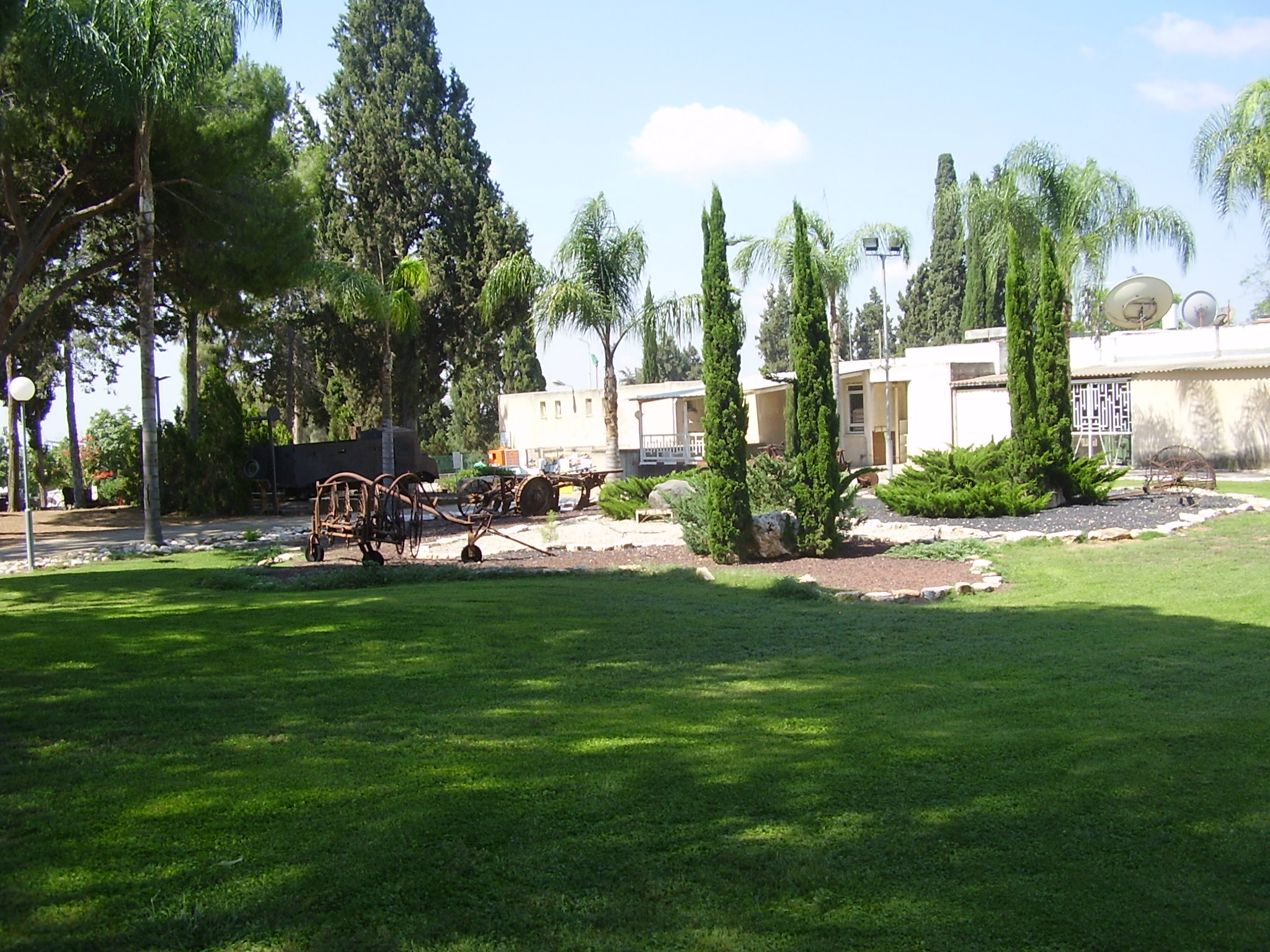

- Location within Central Israel
- Coordinates: 32°22′40″N 34°59′0″E
- Country: Israel
- District: Central
- Subdistrict: HaSharon
- Council: Hefer Valley
- Affiliation: Kibbutz Movement
- Founded: 2 November 1945
- Founder: Central European immigrants
- Population (2024): 929
- Website: www.hamaapil.co.il

HaMa'apil (Hebrew: הַמַּעְפִּיל, lit. The illegal immigrant) is a kibbutz in central Israel. It is located near Ahituv within the jurisdiction of the Hefer Valley Regional Council. In 2024 it had a population of 929.

== History ==
The community was established in Hadera in 1938 by a gar'in group comprising Hashomer Hatzair members who had immigrated from Galicia, Poland, Germany and Austria. The group received training in Beit Zera, Ma'abarot and Merhavia. Most of the members were illegal immigrants (known in Hebrew as Ma'apilim) to Mandatory Palestine.

The kibbutz itself was founded on 2 November 1945, on land near the Arab village of Qaqun.

Notable residents include Chaya Arbel, a German-born composer.
