= Haniel, Israel =

Moshav in central Israel

Haniel: חַנִּיאֵל (Hebrew)
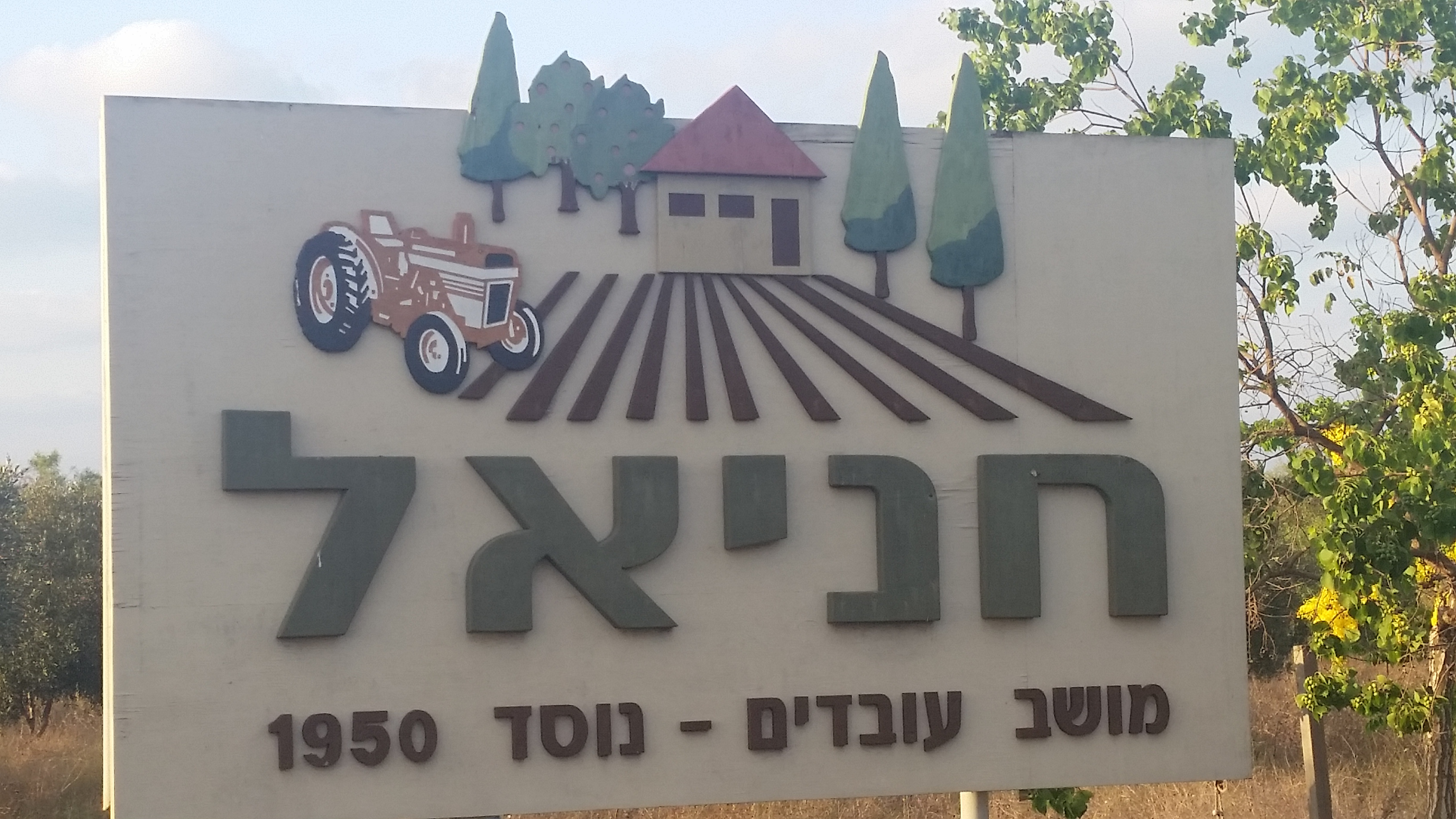
- Village entrance

- Location within Central Israel
- Coordinates: 32°19′56″N 34°57′0″E
- Country: Israel
- District: Central
- Subdistrict: HaSharon
- Council: Hefer Valley
- Affiliation: Moshavim Movement
- Founded: 1950
- Founder: Romanian immigrants
- Population (2024): 909

Haniel (Hebrew: חַנִּיאֵל) is a moshav in central Israel. Located in the Sharon plain near Netanya and Kfar Yona, it falls under the jurisdiction of Hefer Valley Regional Council. In 2024 it had a population of 909.

== History ==
The moshav was founded in 1950 by immigrants from Romania. It was established on the lands of the depopulated Palestinian village of Qaqun. It was named after Haniel Ben Afud, a leader of the Tribe of Manasseh (Numbers 34:23).
