= Ometz, Israel =

Moshav in central Israel

Ometz: אומץ (Hebrew)
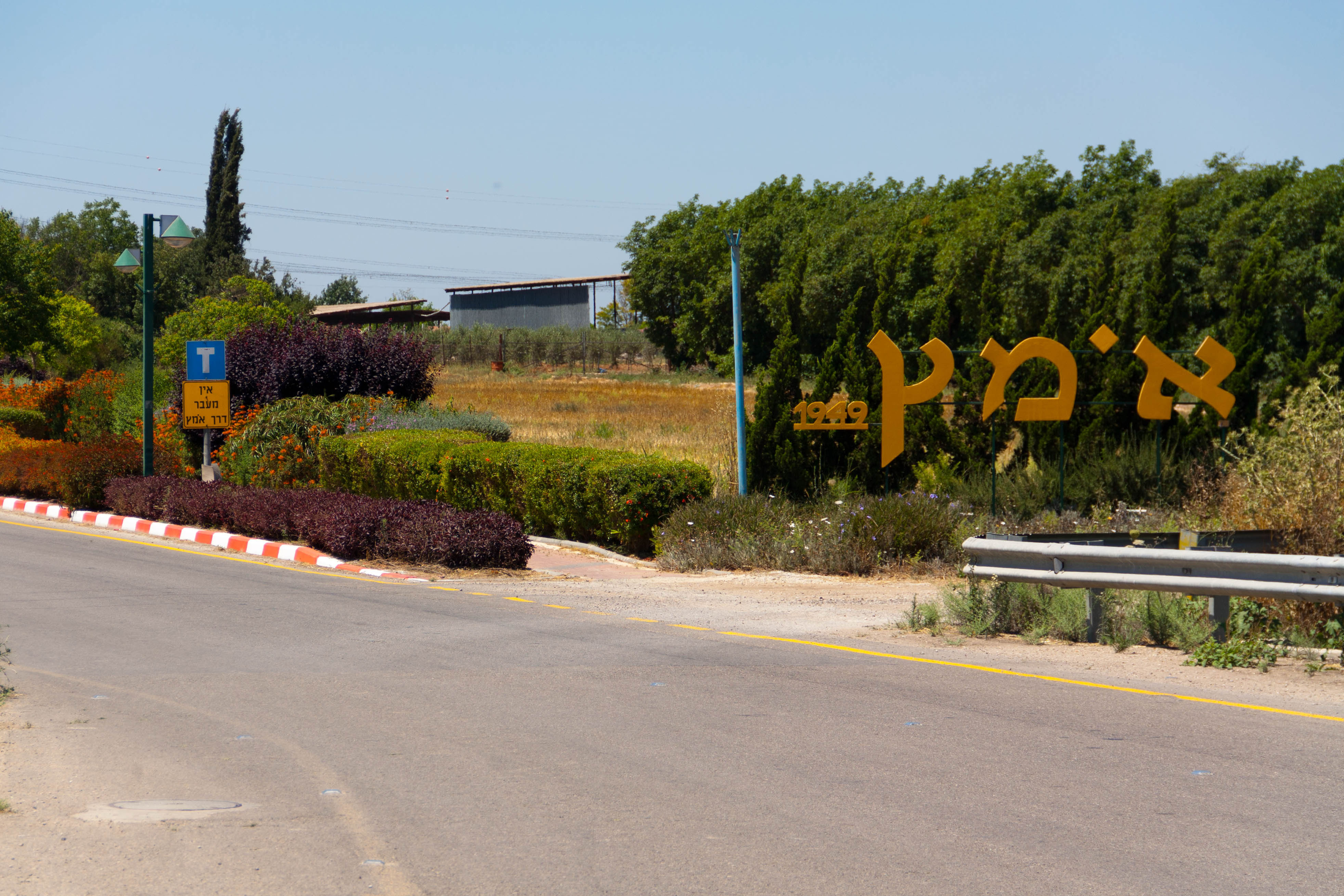
- Village entrance

- Location within Central Israel
- Coordinates: 32°22′10″N 34°59′38″E
- Country: Israel
- District: Central
- Subdistrict: HaSharon
- Council: Hefer Valley
- Affiliation: Moshavim Movement
- Founded: 1949
- Founder: Demobilised IDF soldiers
- Population (2024): 802

Ometz (Hebrew: אומץ, lit. 'Courage') is a moshav in central Israel. Located in the coastal plain near Zemer, it falls under the jurisdiction of Hefer Valley Regional Council. In 2024 it had a population of 802.

== Etymology ==
There are two theories as to the source of the name; one is that it is from the phrase "Ometz VeGvura" (Courage and Bravery); the second is that is an acronym for Irgun Mishuhrarei Tzahal (Hebrew: ארגון משוחררי צה"ל, lit. Organisation of Demobilised IDF [soldiers]).

== History ==
The moshav was founded in 1949 by demobilised IDF soldiers from the 32nd Battalion of the Alexandroni Brigade. The first border settlement in the Hefer Valley to be founded after the 1948 Arab–Israeli War, it was established on land that had previously been occupied by the invading Iraqi army and was located near the depopulated Palestinian village of Qaqun.
