= Tantura =

Palestinian village depopulated in 1948

Tantura الطنطورة al-Tantura
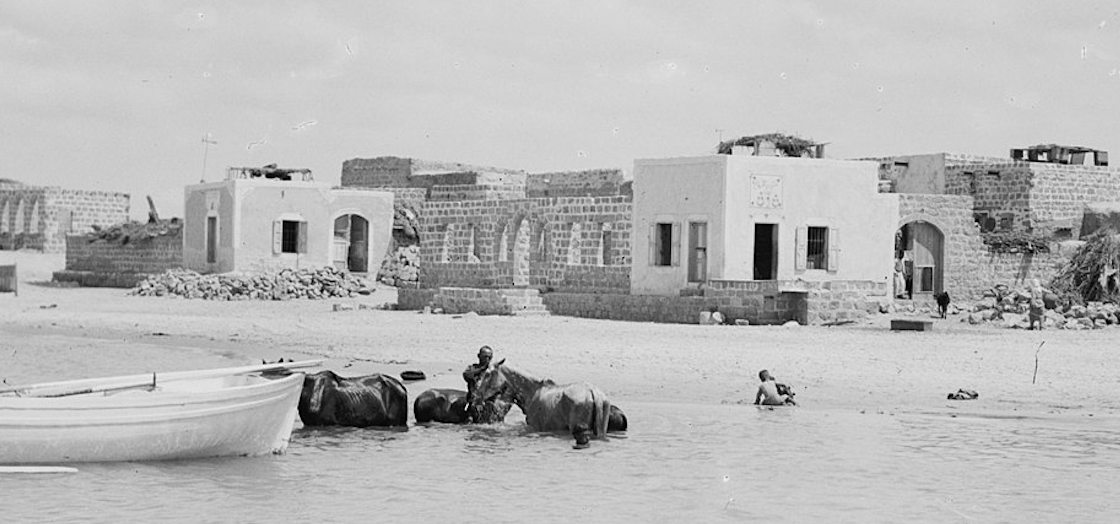
- Tantura (c.1920-1933) during the British Mandate
- Etymology: "The Peak"
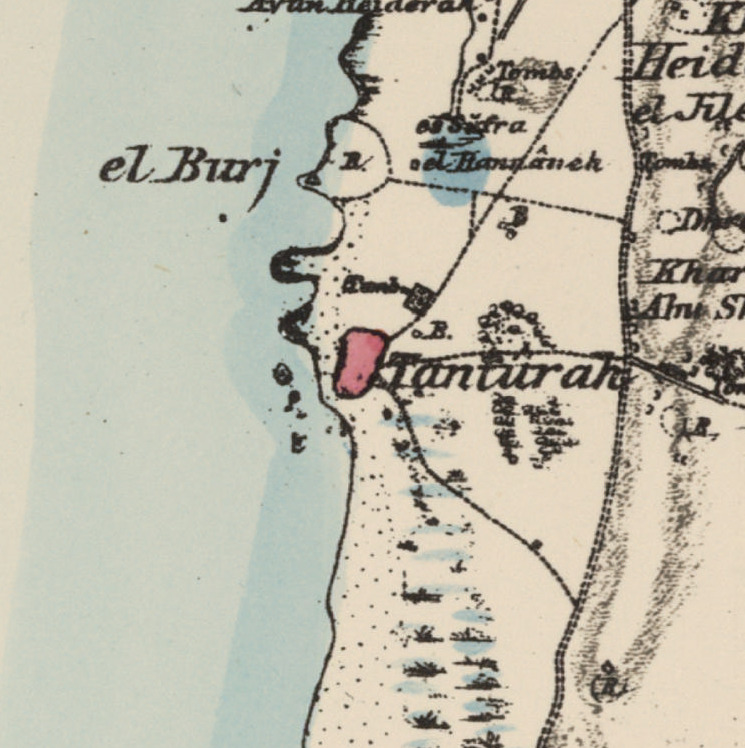
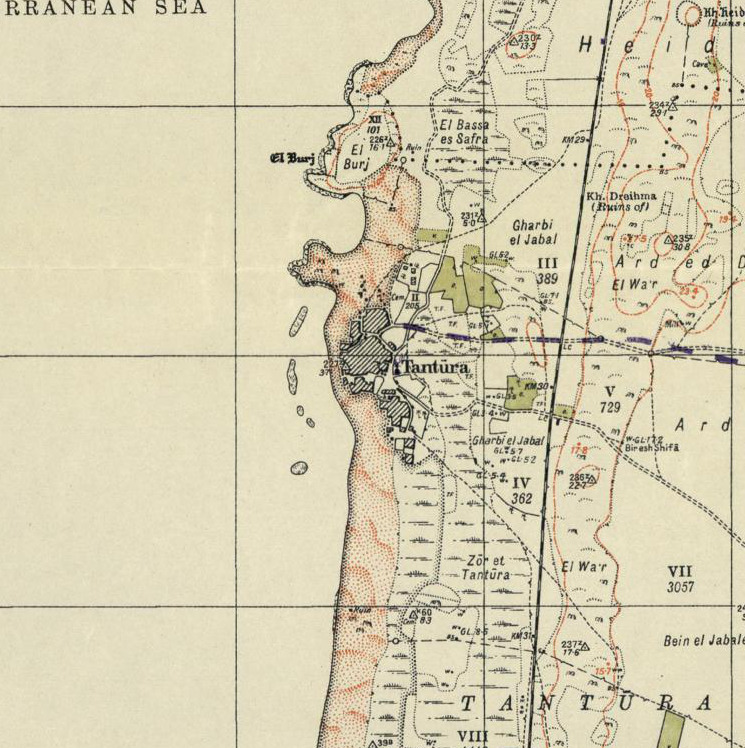
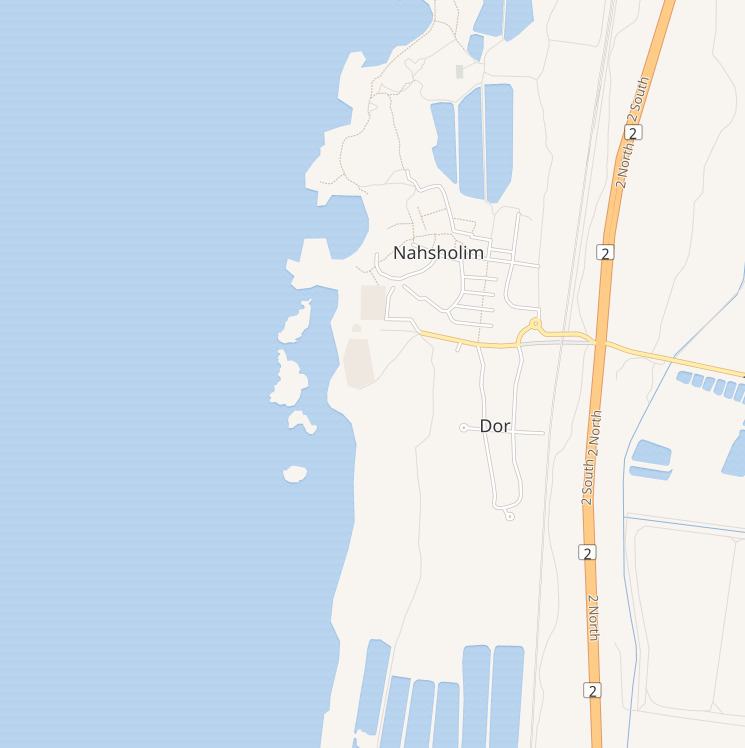
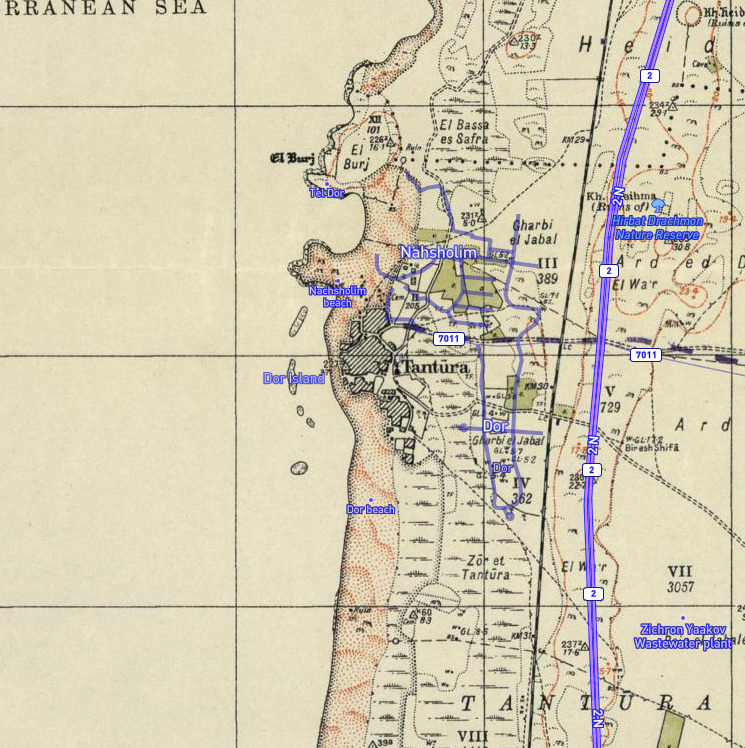
- 1870s map 1940s map modern map 1940s with modern overlay map A series of historical maps of the area around Tantura (click the buttons)

- Location within Mandatory Palestine
- Coordinates: 32°36′34″N 34°55′04″E
- Palestine grid: 142/224
- Geopolitical entity: Mandatory Palestine
- Subdistrict: Haifa
- Date of depopulation: 23 May 1948

Area
  - Total: 14,250 dunams (14.25 km^{2}; 5.50 sq mi)

Population (1945)
  - Total: 1,490
- Cause(s) of depopulation: Expulsion by Yishuv forces
- Current Localities: Nahsholim,Dor

Tantura (Arabic: الطنطورة, al-Tantura, lit. The Peak; Hebrew and Phoenician: דור, Dor) was a Palestinian Arab fishing village located 8 kilometers (5 mi) northwest of Zikhron Ya'akov on the Mediterranean coast of Mandatory Palestine. Near the village lie the ruins of the ancient Phoenician city of Dor.

The village stood on a low limestone hill overlooking the shoreline of two small bays. The water was supplied from a well in the eastern part of the village. The al-Bab gate was in the southeast of the village. The Roman ruins were on the coast to the north with the hill of Umm Rashid to the south. In 1945 it had a population of 1,490.

The village was targeted in the early stages of the 1948 Arab–Israeli War, with its houses looted and its Arab Palestinian inhabitants expelled and others massacred by the Palmach underground Alexandroni Brigade. The Tantura massacre was first documented by Haj Muhammad Nimr al-Khatib, a Palestinian Muslim cleric and member of the Arab National Committee of Haifa, in his report of The Events of the Disaster (Min Athar al-Nakba), decades before a 2022 Israeli documentary revealed testimony from several IDF veterans affirming that a massacre, involving somewhere between several to 200 Palestinian victims, had taken place. Al-Khatib's account also documented cases of Tantura women who had been raped, reporting that victims received treatment at a hospital in Nablus following the massacre.

== History ==
=== Iron Age ===
Dor was the most southern settlement of the Phoenicians on the coast of Syria and a center for the manufacture of Tyrian purple, extracted from the murex snail found there in abundance. Dor is first mentioned in the Egyptian Story of Wenamun, as a port ruled by the Tjeker prince Beder, where Wenamun (a priest of Amun at Karnak) stopped on his way to Byblos and was robbed.

=== Hebrew Bible reference ===
According to the Book of Joshua, Dor was an ancient royal city of the Canaanites commanding the heights, whose king became an ally of Jabin of Hazor in the conflict with Joshua (Jos 11:1-2; Jos 12:23). Dor is also mentioned in the Book of Judges as a Canaanite city whose inhabitants were put to 'taskwork' when the area was allotted to the tribe of Manasseh (Judges 1:27–28). In the Book of Kings, Dor was said to be incorporated into David's Israelite kingdom. In the 10th century BCE, it became the capital of the Heights of Dor under Solomon, and was governed by his son-in-law, Ben-abinadab as one of Solomon's commissariat districts (1 Kings 4:11).

=== Hellenistic and Roman periods ===
Josephus Flavius in his Antiquities of the Jews (14:333) describes Dor as an unsatisfactory port where goods had to be transported by lighters from ships at sea. Dora was the city where Antiochus, ruler of the Hellenistic Seleucid Empire with the aid of Simon Maccabaeus, laid siege to the usurper Trypho. During Pompey's invasion of Judea, Dora was razed, along with all the coastal towns, only to be rebuilt under Gabinius's direction.

Dor was an important salt production site, as attested to by pools and channels dug along the coast.

By the mid-3rd century CE, the city had deteriorated to little more than a fishing village.

=== Byzantine period ===
The importance of Dor/Dora rose again from the 4th to the 7th century CE, becoming by the 5th century the center of a bishopric. Several bishops of Dora of that period are mentioned in Christian church records. The settlement migrated off the ancient tel to the area east of it, centering on the church complex, which served as a way-station for pilgrims traveling to the holy places. In 1950–52 a church was excavated by J. Leibowitz, in 1979–1983 by C. Dauphin, and 1994 by S. Gibson and Dauphin.

Underwater exploration of a Byzantine wreck salvaged a medium-size boat constructed with iron nails. Based on coins recovered from the site, the boat dates to c. 665 CE, a decade after the Muslim conquest. Artifacts include several objects testifying to the practice of light-fishing.

=== Early Islamic period ===
The village of Tantura, further south, was probably established after the church was abandoned in the Early Islamic period. 34 apparently Muslim graves, dating from the 8th to the 14th century, have been excavated from the area of the ruined Byzantine church.

=== Crusader period ===
In the Middle Ages, a small fort surrounded by a moat was built on the southwestern promontory of the tell, overlooking the entrance to the southern bay. Dor has been identified with the Crusader principality of Merle, although excavations at the site, known in Arabic as Khirbet el-Burj, indicate that the moat was dug later, in the 13th century. The fort was in the possession of the Knights Templar until 1187, when it was conquered by Sultan Saladin after the Battle of Hattin. The Templars retook it shortly afterwards, at the latest during the Third Crusade. In the autumn of 1191, Richard the Lionheart rested there with his army as he waited for the Acre fleet. Eventually, the fort was controlled by the Mamluks along with the Château Pèlerin by 1291 or earlier.

==== Later titular Catholic see of Dora ====
There are records of several 14th and 15th century Latin bishops of the see, which under the name Dora is still a titular see of the Catholic Church. The titular Bishops of Dora were (1876-1980) the Grand Priors of the Royal Spanish Military Orders as territorial prelates of Ciudad Real (this prelature became in 1980 the current Diocese of Ciudad Real).

=== Ottoman period ===
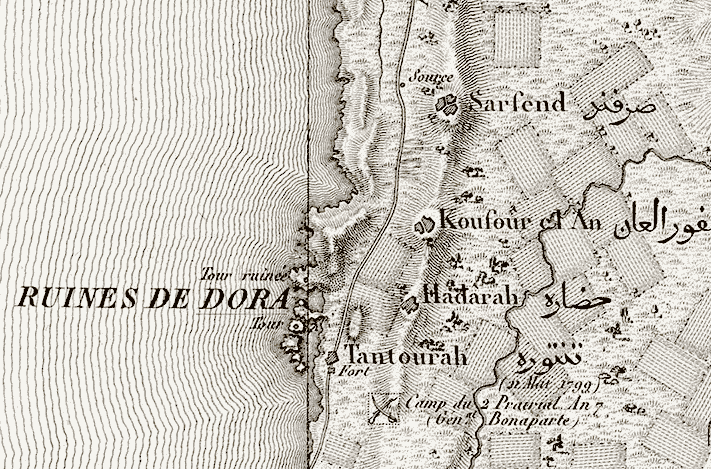
Jacotin's map showing Napoleon's visit in 1799

Tantura rose in importance in the mid-18th century with the increased demand for cotton in Europe. Zahir al-Umar carried out a policy of expansion of trade, increasing the capacity of the port at Tantura, as well as those of Haifa and Acre.

Tantura was visited in 1738 by Richard Pococke, who called it "Tortura." He wrote that it was a small village with a port to the south for large boats.

In 1799 when Napoleon Bonaparte besieged Acre, he used the anchorage at Tantura as a supply depot. Napoleon camped at Tantura on May 21, 1799, and a garrison was stationed there for the remainder of the French campaign. Napoleon's officer Lambert, who had been sent to investigate the port, reported that it had a population of about 2,000, who seemed sympathetic to the French. After the failure of his campaign, his troops retreated to Tantura, where he hoped to evacuate by sea, but his navy failed to appear. To free up horses for carrying the wounded, he ordered heavy ordnance dumped in the bay. Artillery pieces, muskets and ammunition have been found in underwater surveys around Dor. It appeared as the village Tantourah on the map that Pierre Jacotin compiled during this campaign.

The British traveller James Silk Buckingham, who visited in 1816, described al-Tantura as a small village with a small port and a khan (caravanserai). Mary Rogers, sister of the British vice-consul in Haifa, reported that in 1855 there were 30–40 houses in the village, with cattle and goats as the chief source of income.

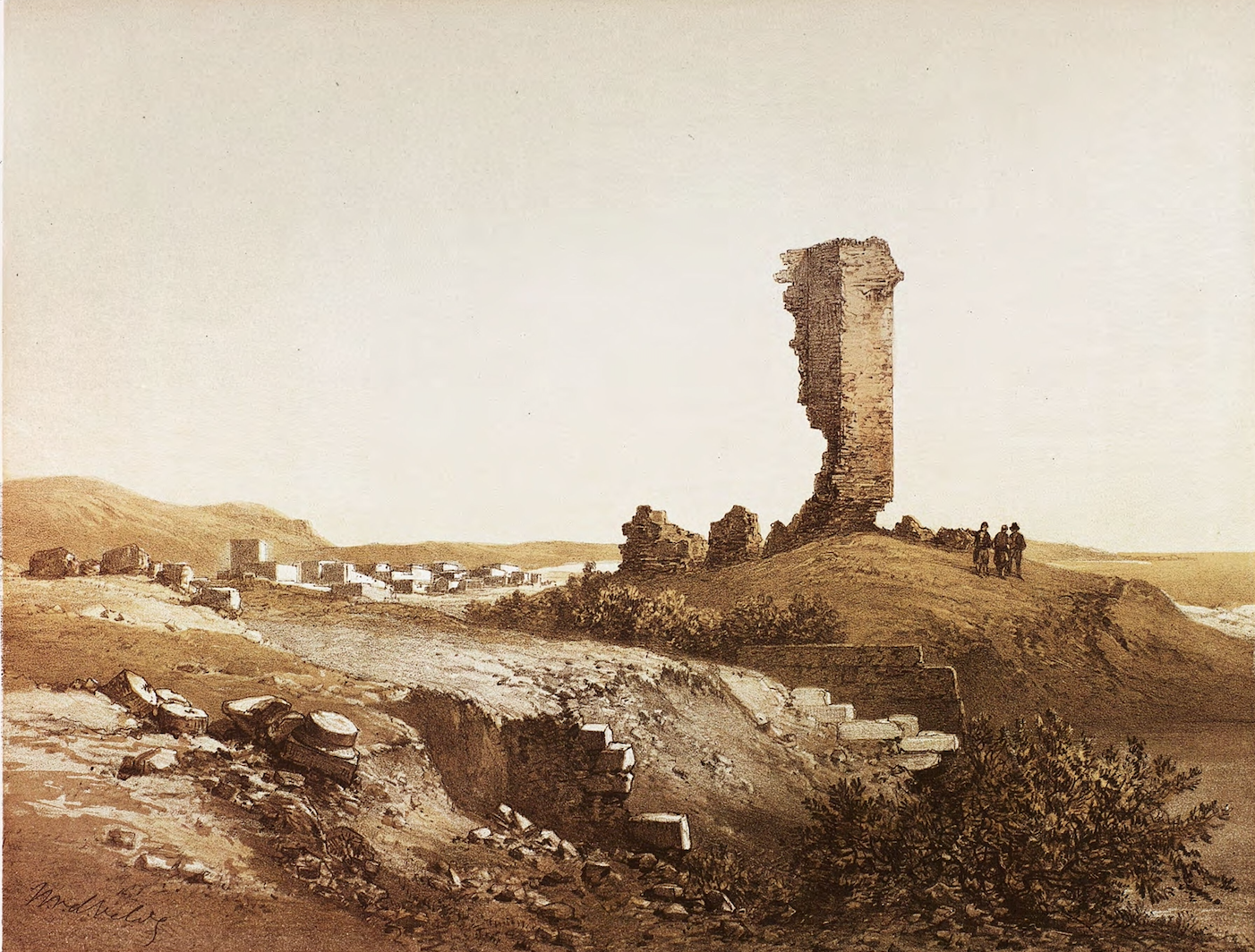
Tantura, in 1851, by van de Velde

In 1859, William McClure Thomson described Tantura/Dor in his travelogue:

'Tantura merits very little attention. It is a sad and sickly hamlet of wretched huts on a naked sea-beach, with a marshy flat between it and the base of the eastern hills. The sheikh's residence and the public menzûl for travellers are the only respectable houses, Dor never could have been a large city, for there are no remains. The artificial tell, with a fragment of the Kùsr standing like a column upon it, was probably the most ancient site. In front of the present village and five small islets, by the aid of which an artificial harbour could easily be constructed. The entrance to which would be by the inlet at the foot of the Kùsr; and should "Dor and her towns" ever rise again into wealth and importance such a harbour will assuredly be made'.

When Victor Guérin visited in 1870, he found the village to have twelve hundred inhabitants, and further noted that the village itself was built largely with materials taken from the ancient city of Dor.

In 1882, in the PEF's Survey of Western Palestine, Tantura was described as a village on the coast with a harbour located to the north, and a square, stone building used as a guest house for travellers (probably the khan referred to by Buckingham). The population was engaged in agriculture and conducted a small trade with Jaffa.

In 1884 Mordechai Bonstein, a Russian Jewish farmer pioneer from Rosh Pinna, moved to Tantura to farm a tract of land owned by Baron Edmond de Rothschild. Bonstein, his wife Haya, and their nine children were the only Jews in the village. The farm was successful and the family maintained good relations with their Arab neighbours.

A population list from about 1887 showed that Tanturah had about 770 inhabitants, all Muslim. A boys' elementary school was built in Tantura in 1889.

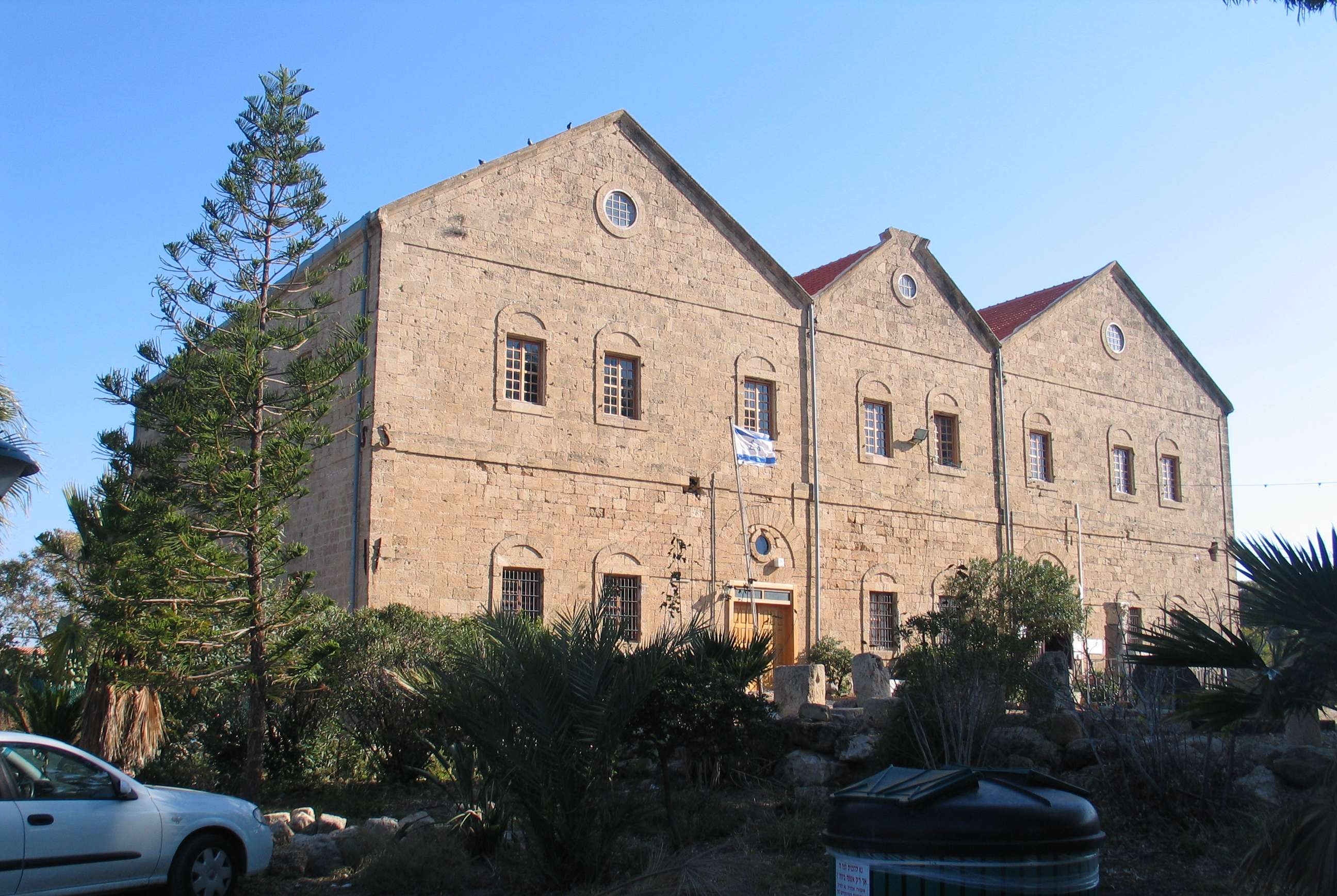
Rothschild bottle factory, built in Tantura, 1891

In 1891, Baron Rothschild financed the development of a bottle factory in Tantura, as he planned to use the fine sand on the shore to manufacture glass bottles for the fledgling wine industry in Zikhron Ya'akov. A building was constructed under the supervision of Meir Dizengoff, a French glass specialist was brought in, dozens of workers were hired, and three ships were purchased to transport raw material and bottles. But, he abandoned the factory in 1895 after a string of failures.

In 1898, German Emperor Wilhelm II visited the ruins of the crusader castle.

=== British Mandate period ===
According to the British Mandate's 1922 census of Palestine, al-Tantura had a population of 750 inhabitants; 749 Muslims and 1 Roman Catholic Christian, increasing in the 1931 census to 953; 944 Muslims, 8 Christians and 1 Jew. During this period Tantura's houses, situated along the beach, were constructed from stone. In addition to the boys' school, a girls' school was founded in 1937-38. There were two Islamic holy sites in the village, including a maqam (shrine) dedicated to an Abd ar-Rahman Sa'd ad-Din.

During the British Mandate, the fish catch increased from six tons in 1928 to 1,622 tons in 1944. The major agricultural products were grain, vegetables, and fruit. In 1944/45 a total of 26 dunams was devoted to citrus and bananas, 6,593 to cereals and 287 dunams to orchards, mainly olives.

In Sami Hadawi's land and population survey in 1945, the town had a population 1,490; 20 Christians and 1,470 Muslims, and a total land area of 14,250 dunams. Of this, Arabs used 26 dunums for citrus and bananas, 6,593 to cereals; 287 dunums were irrigated or used for orchards, while a total of 123 dunams were built-up (urban) land.

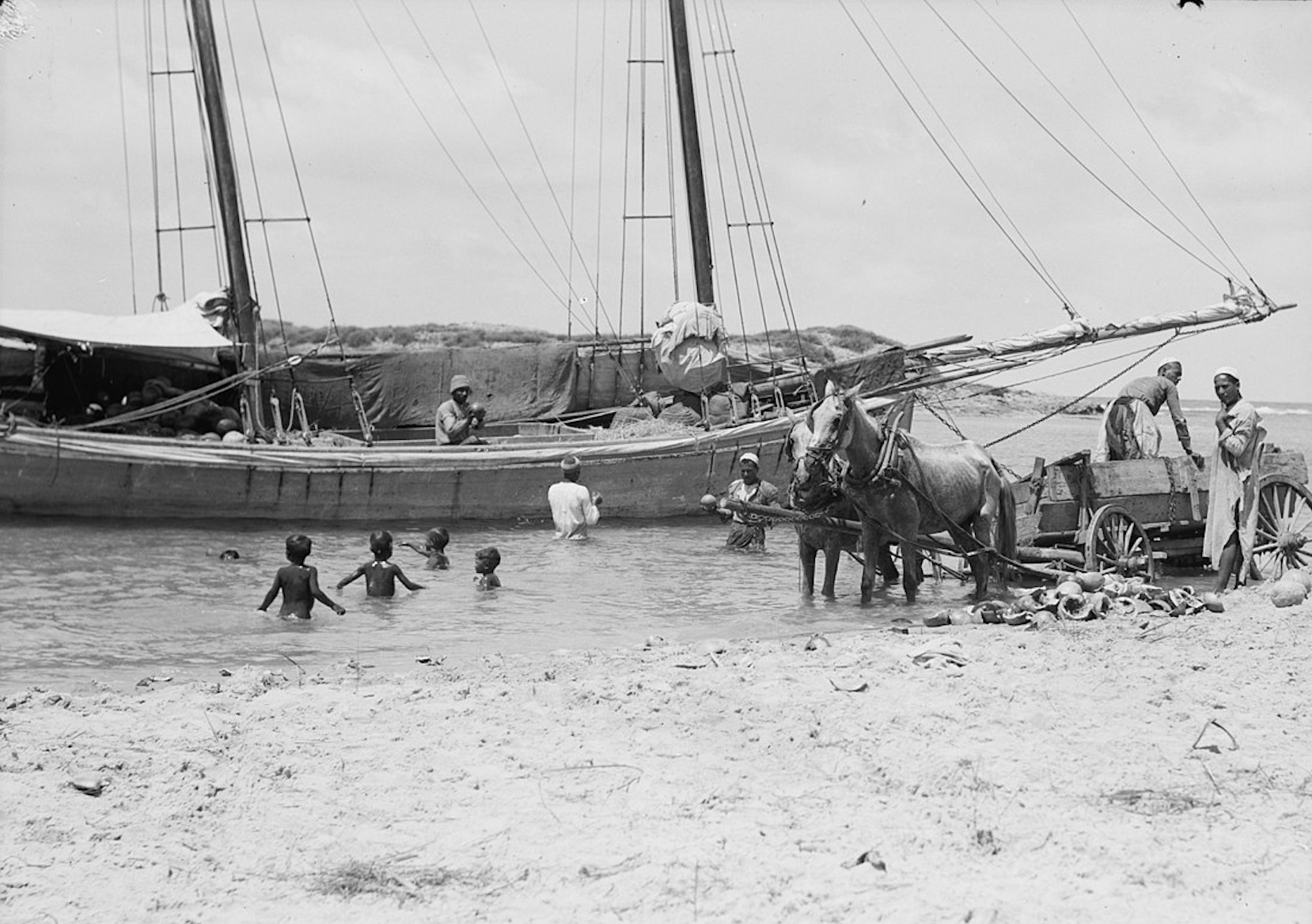
Loading melons in Tantura, (picture taken 1920-1933)

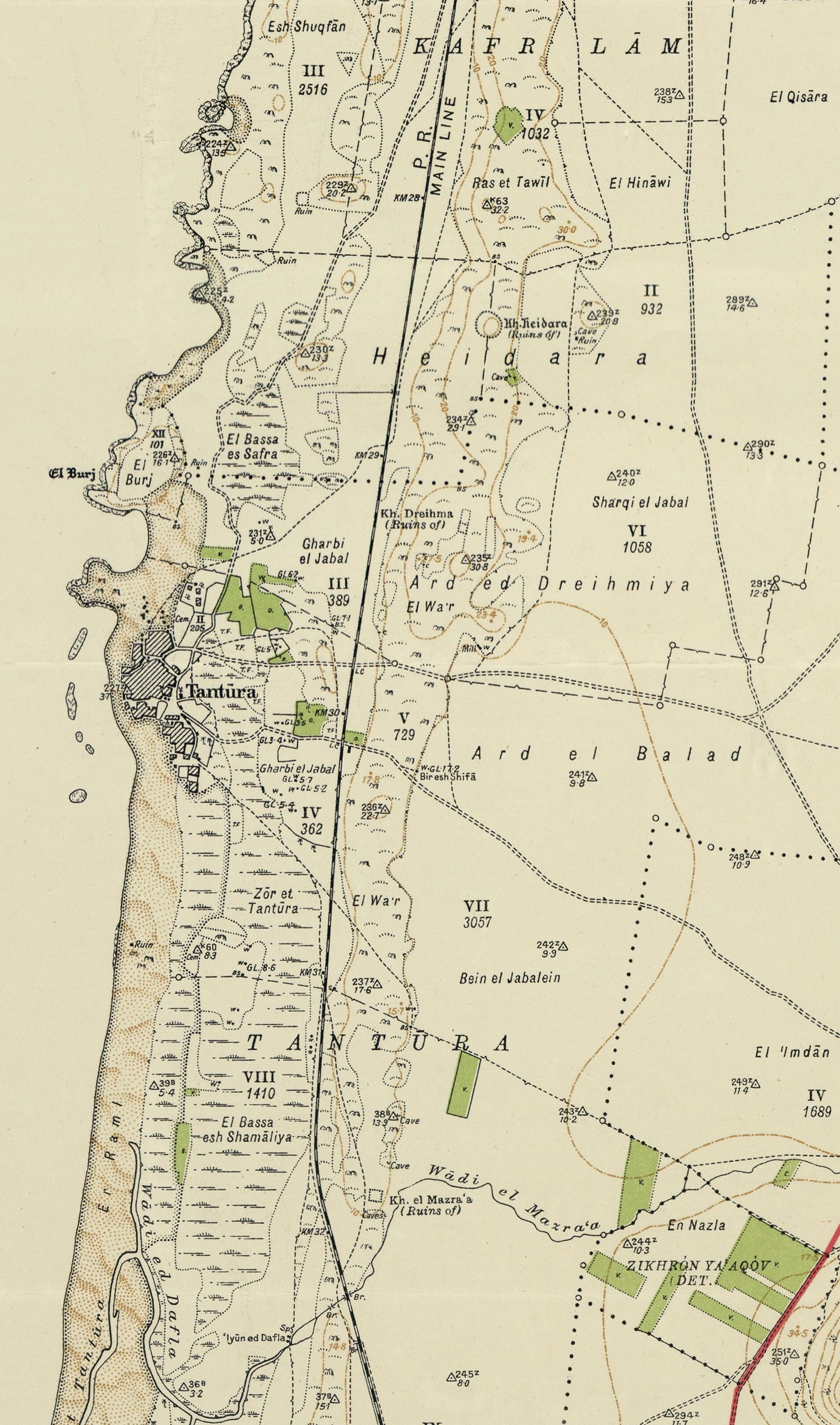
Tantura 1938 1:20,000

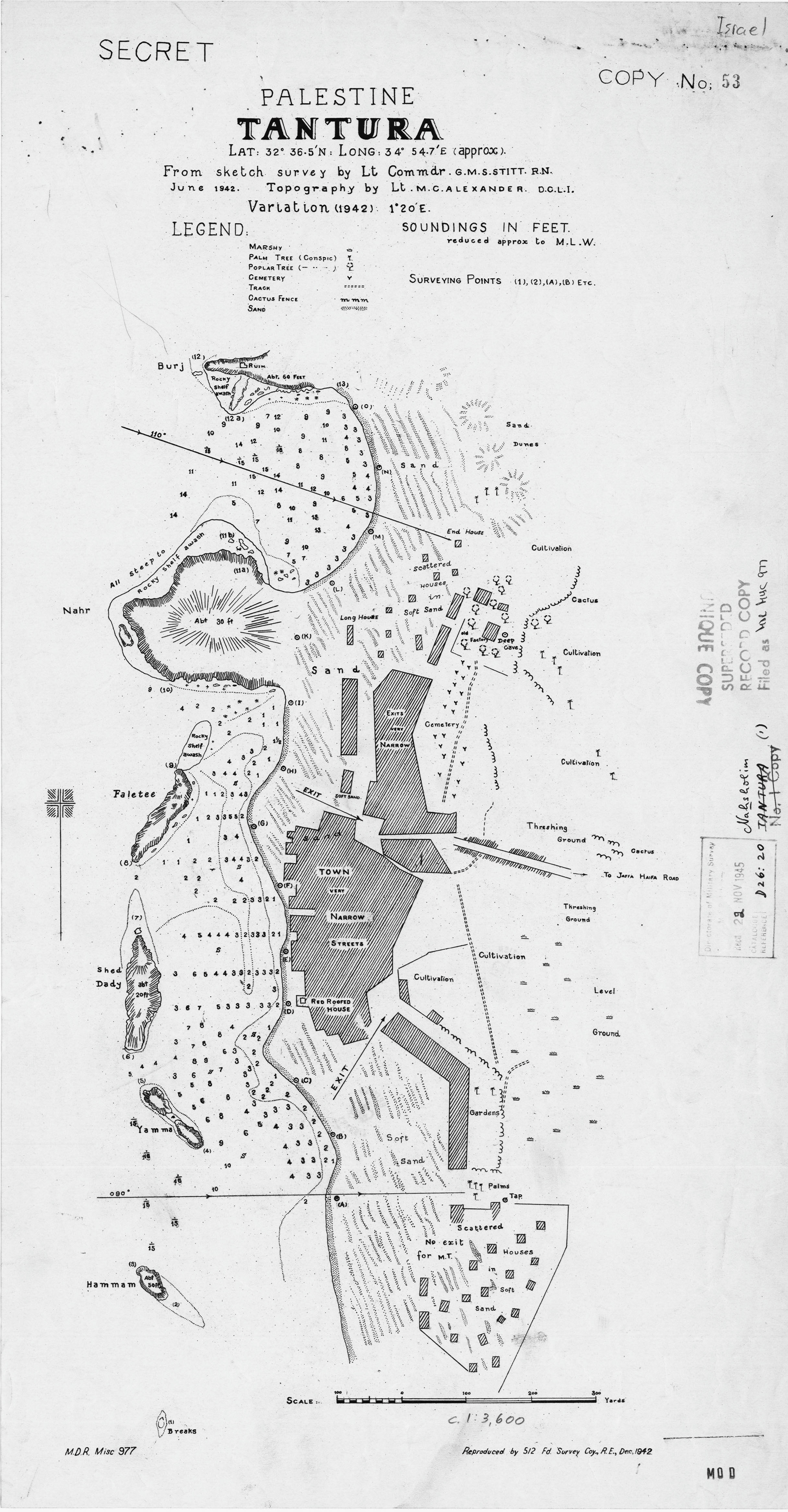
British survey map, 1942

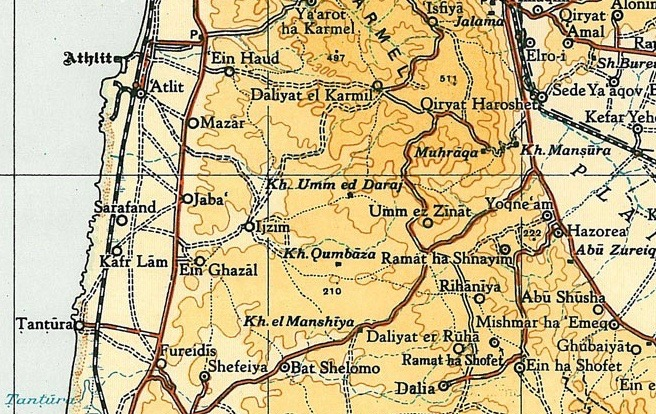
Tantura 1945 1:250,000

Palestine Railways main line from Haifa to Kantara via Lydda had a station serving Tantura. In March 1954 the railroad department at the Ministry of Transportation renamed the station into Dor. Up to 1956, the Israel Railways timetable listed the station as Dor (Tantura); from 1957 onwards, only the name Dor was posted. In 1977 the railway station was abolished.

=== 1948 war ===
In 1948, al-Tantura was within the area designated by the United Nations in the Partition Plan for a Jewish state. Some of the inhabitants were civil servants, working as policemen, customs officials and clerks at the Haifa Magistrates court. A paved road led to the Haifa Highway. The village was one of the most developed in the region. Some residents of Tantura had been involved in the armed Arab Revolt against the British, and three were killed in a skirmish with the British near the village. At the beginning of the 1948 Palestine war, the wealthier families fled to Haifa. Approximately 1,200 remained in the village, continuing to tend their fields, orchards, and ply their trade as fishermen.

Tantura was part of an Arab enclave cutting off the road from Tel Aviv to Haifa. Allegedly, following attacks by local Arab villages on Jewish traffic from Tel Aviv to Haifa, on May 9, 1948, the Haganah leadership decided to "expel or subdue" the villages of Kafr Saba, al-Tira, Qaqun, Qalansuwa and Tantura. On May 11, David Ben-Gurion advised the Haganah to "focus on its primary task", which according to the New Historian, Ilan Pappe, was the bi'ur (lit. cleansing) of Palestine. According to Tiroshi Eitan (a local commander), the people of Tantura were ready to surrender in early May but not prepared to relinquish their arms.

Morale among Tantura's Arab residents was low after the fall of Haifa. In early May, the population was reportedly ready to surrender if attacked or given an ultimatum, but was not to give up their weapons, and some residents began fleeing after an incident in which a local man murdered a Jew and was in turn killed. Many villagers fled to Tyre by boat. Perhaps heartened by the arrival of Arab forces in Israel/Palestine in mid-May, Tantura's villagers and those of surrounding towns decided to remain and fight. The inhabitants subsequently began to prepare defensive fortifications and lay mines.

==== Tantura massacre ====
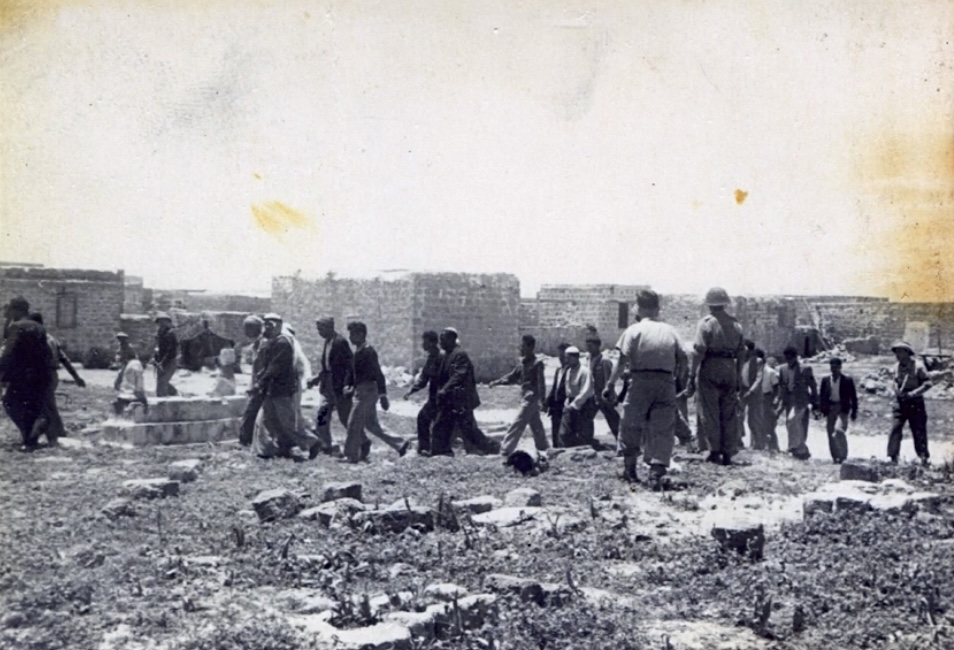
Israeli soldiers with detained Palestinian men in Tantura, May 23 1948

On the night of May 22–23, the Alexandroni Brigade's 33rd battalion launched an attack, employing heavy machine gun fire, followed by an infantry attack from all landward sides with an Israeli naval vessel blocking any chance of escape to the sea. Although the villagers put up serious resistance, the village fell to the Brigade by 0800hrs on May 23. Israeli historian Ilan Pappé wrote that in addition to executions, a number of villagers were killed in "a killing spree inside the houses and in the streets." The number of those killed is unknown, with estimates ranging from "dozens" to 200+. (Note: Hashem Abushama, According to Whose Archives?: The Tantura Massacre and Revisionist Israeli Historiography, January 30 2022, Institute for Palestine Studies. https://www.palestine-studies.org/en/node/1652421 "There also remains a mass grave. [...] It reportedly contains between a few dozens to more than 200 buried corpses of Palestinian men who were massacred") (Note: "In May 1948, more than 200 Palestinians were killed by the advancing Jewish militia in the coastal village of Tantura, south of Haifa." John Pilger, New Statesman, 6/3/2002, Vol. 131, Issue 4590) (Note: Blackwell, Sue. "Review Essay: States of Denial." Holy Land Studies: A Multidisciplinary Journal, vol. 6 no. 1, 2007, p. 113-118. Project MUSE, https://dx.doi.org/10.1353/hls.2007.0016. "Ilan Pappé [...] has documented in detail the massacre of some 200 men, women and children at Tantura on 22–23 May 1948") (Note: Morris 2004. "Dozens of villagers were killed.) (Note: Adam Raz, Haaretz "The number of villagers who were shot to death can’t be established. The numbers arising from the testimonies range from a handful who were killed, to many dozens. According to one testimony, provided by a resident of Zichron Yaakov who helped bury the victims, the number of dead exceeded 200, though this high figure does not have corroboration.") (Note: Jawad, S.A. (2007). Zionist Massacres: the Creation of the Palestinian Refugee Problem in the 1948 War. "Casualties, including those killed in battle and those massacred, are estimated to be between 52 and 85")

===== Aftermath =====
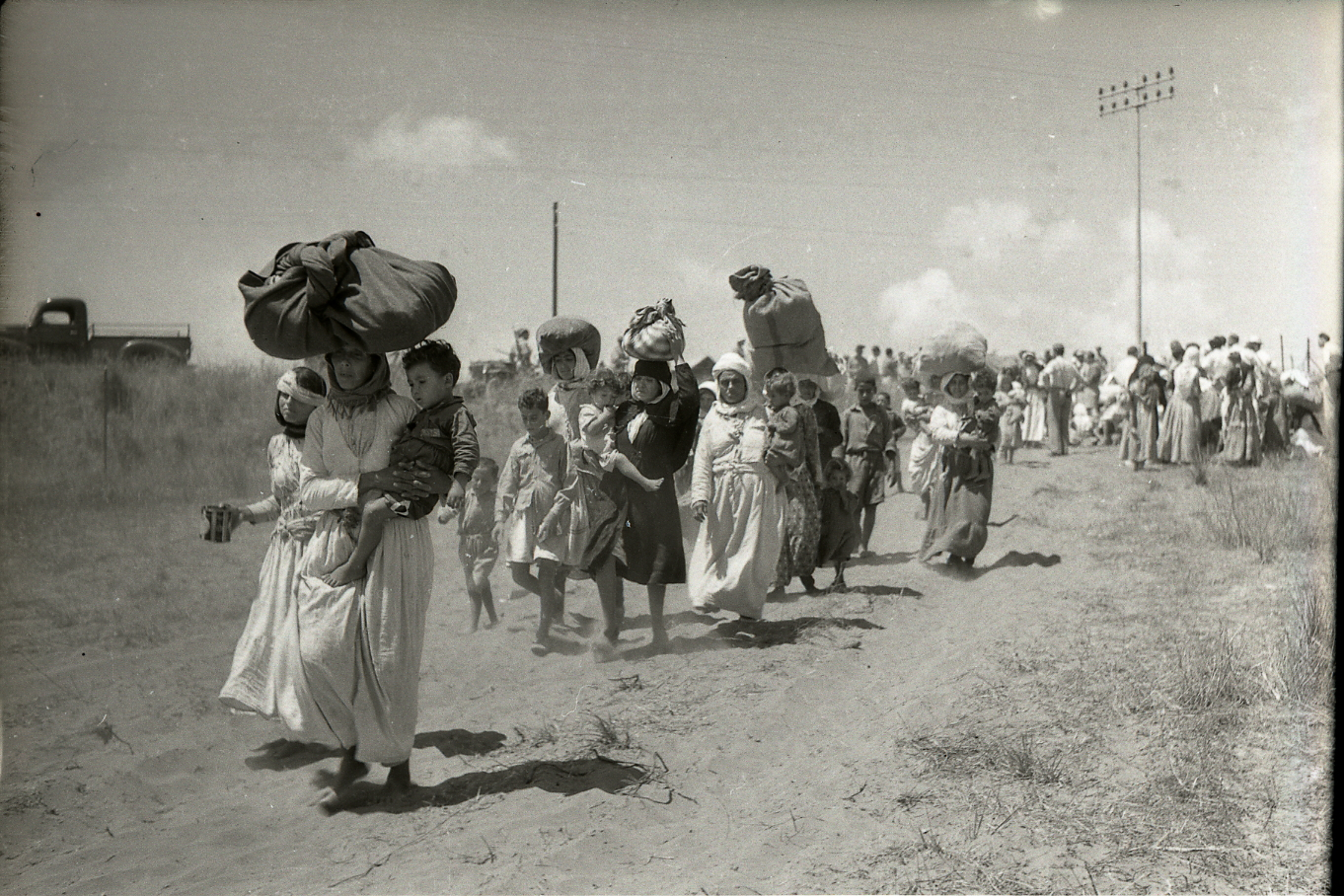
Expusion of the Tantura civilians, 1948.

Most of the villagers were expelled to the nearby town of Fureidis and territory protected by the Arab League in the Triangle region near to what was to become the Green Line. Women and children were taken to Fureidis, which had already surrendered. On May 31, 1948, Bechor Shitrit, Minister of Minority Affairs of the Provisional government of Israel, sought permission to expel them due to overcrowding, lack of sanitation, and the risk of information being passed to unconquered villages. Haganah intelligence also pressured Ben-Gurion to expel them as they were giving intelligence to nearby unconquered Arab villages and due to problems with sanitation and overcrowding. It is unknown whether Ben-Gurion replied or not, but on 18 June most of the Tantura women and children were expelled to Tulkarm. Some women and children, probably those with male relatives still in Israeli detention, were allowed to remain in Fureidis. A Ministry official, Ya'akov Epstein of Zikhron Ya'akov, who visited Tantura shortly after the operation, reported seeing bodies, but said nothing of a massacre. In 1998, Yahya Al Yahya published a book on Tantura recording the names of 52 dead. The occupation of the village was followed by looting. Some of the items recovered by the Haganah included 'one carpet, one gramophone ... one basket with cucumbers ... one goat'.

Females, including girls as young as 14, were reportedly treated at a Nablus hospital, having been raped during the massacre.

The male prisoners of war were held in the Zichron Ya'akov police station.

Soldiers involved in the massacre were known to routinely brag about the heinous methods they deployed during their pillage. Retired Zionist soldier Youssef Diamont described how the men of the village were separated from the women, corralled into a cage-like structure and then fired upon. Women, including girls as young as 14, were then raped. Weapons such as flamethrowers were used against the villagers.

== Nahsholim and Dor ==
After the war, the kibbutz of Nahsholim and the moshav of Dor were built on land on the outskirts of al-Tantura. Jewish settlers initially moved into the abandoned Arab houses in the village but left after building more suitable housing further down the coast. According to local legend, when bulldozers tried to knock down the local Maqam (shrine) of Sheikh al-Majrami, the blades of the bulldozers broke. Kibbutz Nahsholim was established by Polish and American settlers just southeast of the ancient tell in June 1948 while moshav Dor was established by Jewish settlers from Greece along the southernmost bay in 1949. Kibbutz Nahsholim grows bananas, avocado and cotton, and raises fish in ponds. A plastics factory manufactures irrigation equipment. It also operates a beach resort.

== Marine archaeology ==
Many shipwrecks from several periods have been discovered in the waters off Dor.

A 9th-century wreck known as Tantura B, most likely an Arab trading vessel, was discovered in shallow water off the Tantura coast. Excavations were conducted from 1994 to 1996 by the Institute for Nautical Archaeology (Texas A&M University) and the University of Haifa's Center for Maritime Studies under the direction of Shelley Waschsmann and Yaakov Kahanov. The Tantura B hull was found resting on top of another shipwreck dating to the Roman period. Excavations at Tel Dor in 1986 unearthed an intact purple dye manufacturing installation, based on dye extracted from murex marine snails.

== See also ==
- Depopulated Palestinian locations in Israel
- List of massacres committed prior to the 1948 Arab-Israeli war
- Killings and massacres during the 1948 Palestine War
- List of villages depopulated during the Arab–Israeli conflict
- New Historians

== Bibliography ==
- Abu-Sitta, S.H. (2007). The Return Journey, A Guide to the Depopulated and Present Palestinian Towns and Villages and Holy Sites. Stratford, London: Palestine Land Society. ISBN 978-0-9549034-1-1.
- Barron, J.B., ed. (1923). Palestine: Report and General Abstracts of the Census of 1922. Government of Palestine.
- Benveniśtî, M. (2000). Sacred landscape: the buried history of the Holy Land since 1948 (Illustrated ed.). University of California Press. ISBN 0-520-21154-5.
- Buckingham, J.S. (1821). Travels in Palestine through the countries of Bashan and Gilead, east of the River Jordan, including a visit to the cities of Geraza and Gamala in the Decapolis. London: Longman, Hurst, Rees, Orme and Brown.
- Conder, C.R.; Kitchener, H.H. (1882). The Survey of Western Palestine: Memoirs of the Topography, Orography, Hydrography, and Archaeology. Vol. 2. London: Committee of the Palestine Exploration Fund.
- Department of Statistics (1945). Village Statistics, April, 1945. Government of Palestine.
- Gelber, Y. (2006). Palestine, 1948: War, Escape and the Emergence of the Palestinian Refugee Problem (in French). Paris: L'Imprimerie Nationale. ISBN 9781845190750.
- Guérin, V. (1875). Description Géographique Historique et Archéologique de la Palestine (in French). Vol. 2: Samarie, pt. 2. Paris: L'Imprimerie Nationale.
- Hadawi, S. (1970). Village Statistics of 1945: A Classification of Land and Area ownership in Palestine. Palestine Liberation Organization Research Center. Archived from the original on 2018-12-08.
- Khalidi, W. (1992). All That Remains: The Palestinian Villages Occupied and Depopulated by Israel in 1948. Washington D.C.: Institute for Palestine Studies. ISBN 0-88728-224-5.
- Karmon, Y. (1960). "An Analysis of Jacotin's Map of Palestine" (PDF). Israel Exploration Journal. 10 (3, 4): 155–173, 244–253. Archived from the original (PDF) on 2017-12-01.
- Mills, E., ed. (1932). Census of Palestine 1931. Population of Villages, Towns and Administrative Areas. Jerusalem: Government of Palestine.
- Morris, B. (2004). The Birth of the Palestinian Refugee Problem Revisited. Cambridge University Press. ISBN 978-0-521-00967-6.
- Palmer, E.H. (1881). The Survey of Western Palestine: Arabic and English Name Lists Collected During the Survey by Lieutenants Conder and Kitchener, R. E. Transliterated and Explained by E.H. Palmer. Committee of the Palestine Exploration Fund.
- Pappé, I. (2006). The Ethnic Cleansing of Palestine. London and New York: Oneworld. ISBN 1-85168-467-0.
- Petersen, Andrew (2001). A Gazetteer of Buildings in Muslim Palestine (British Academy Monographs in Archaeology). Vol. I. Oxford University Press. pp. 292−293. ISBN 978-0-19-727011-0.
- Pococke, R. (1745). A description of the East, and some other countries. Vol. 2. London: Printed for the author, by W. Bowyer.
- Polzer, M. 2008. "Toggles and Sails in the Ancient World: Rigging Elements Recovered from the Tantura B Shipwreck". IJNA 37: 225–52.
- Pringle, D. (1997). Secular buildings in the Crusader Kingdom of Jerusalem: an archaeological Gazetter. Cambridge University Press. ISBN 0521-46010-7.
- Rogers, Mary Eliza (1865). Domestic life in Palestine. Cincinnati: Poe & Hitchcock.
- Sa'di, A.H.; Abu-Lughod, L. (2007). Nakba. Columbia University Press. ISBN 978-0-231-13579-5. (Samera Esmeir, 2007, pp. 229-250; in Sa'di and Abu-Lughod)
- Schumacher, G. (1888). "Population list of the Liwa of Akka". Quarterly Statement - Palestine Exploration Fund. 20: 169–191.
- Thomson, W.M. (1859). The Land and the Book: Or, Biblical Illustrations Drawn from the Manners and Customs, the Scenes and Scenery, of the Holy Land. Vol. 2 (1 ed.). New York: Harper & brothers.
- Yazbak, M. (1998). Haifa in the Late Ottoman Period, A Muslim Town in Transition, 1864–1914. Brill Academic Pub. ISBN 90-04-11051-8.
