= Alexandroni Brigade =

Israeli military unit

- חטיבת אלכסנדרוני
- Brigade insignia
- Active: 1948–present
- Country: Israel
- Allegiance: Israeli Ground Forces
- Branch: Infantry
- Type: Reserves
- Size: 5 battalions
- Part of: 91st Division, Northern Command
- Engagements: 1948 Arab–Israeli War; Operation Ben Nun Alef; Six-Day War; Yom Kippur War; 1982 Lebanon War; 2006 Lebanon War; 2024 Israeli invasion of Lebanon

Commanders
- Current commander: Colonel Moshe Passal

The 3rd "Alexandroni" Brigade (Hebrew: חטיבת אלכסנדרוני, Hativat Aleksandroni) is an Israel Defense Forces brigade which has fought in many of Israel's wars.

== Organization ==
- 3rd Infantry Brigade "Alexandroni" (Reserve)
  - 7012th Infantry Battalion
  - 8101st Infantry Battalion
  - 9203rd Infantry Battalion
  - (6609th) Reconnaissance Battalion "Alexandroni"
  - 5280th Combat Engineer Battalion
  - 5503rd Logistic Battalion
  - 8144th Signal Company

== Role in Tantura massacre ==
During the 1948 Arab–Israeli War, around 40–200 Palestinian Arab villagers from Tantura were killed in a massacre perpetrated by the Alexandroni Brigade, which at the time was one of six field forces of the Haganah. The massacre, which took place on the night of 22–23 May 1948, occurred following the surrender of Tantura, a village of roughly 1,500 people in 1945 located near Haifa. The bodies of the victims were buried in mass graves, one of which was later covered and a carpark constructed above it.

In 1998, an Israeli researcher Teddy Katz interviewed and taped Israeli and Palestinian witnesses to events at Tantura in 1948 and wrote a master's thesis at Haifa University claiming that Israeli units committed a massacre of Palestinians at Tantura. The veterans of the brigade sued Katz for libel. Katz was forced to retract his conclusion and to apologize.

The case provoked a lively reaction from historian Ilan Pappé, who accused his university of ‘moral cowardice’ for not having been able or willing to defend Katz's arguments, despite the fact that his work had been duly supervised and approved by his supervisor (who was, among other things, the director of the department to which Katz belonged).

In 2023, an Israeli documentary was published on the Tantura massacre, which interviewed and filmed Katz, as well as several veterans, who agreed to talk about the events. The movie was harshly criticized by the historian Benny Morris, who characterized the documentary as "basically fraudulent".

== Gallery ==
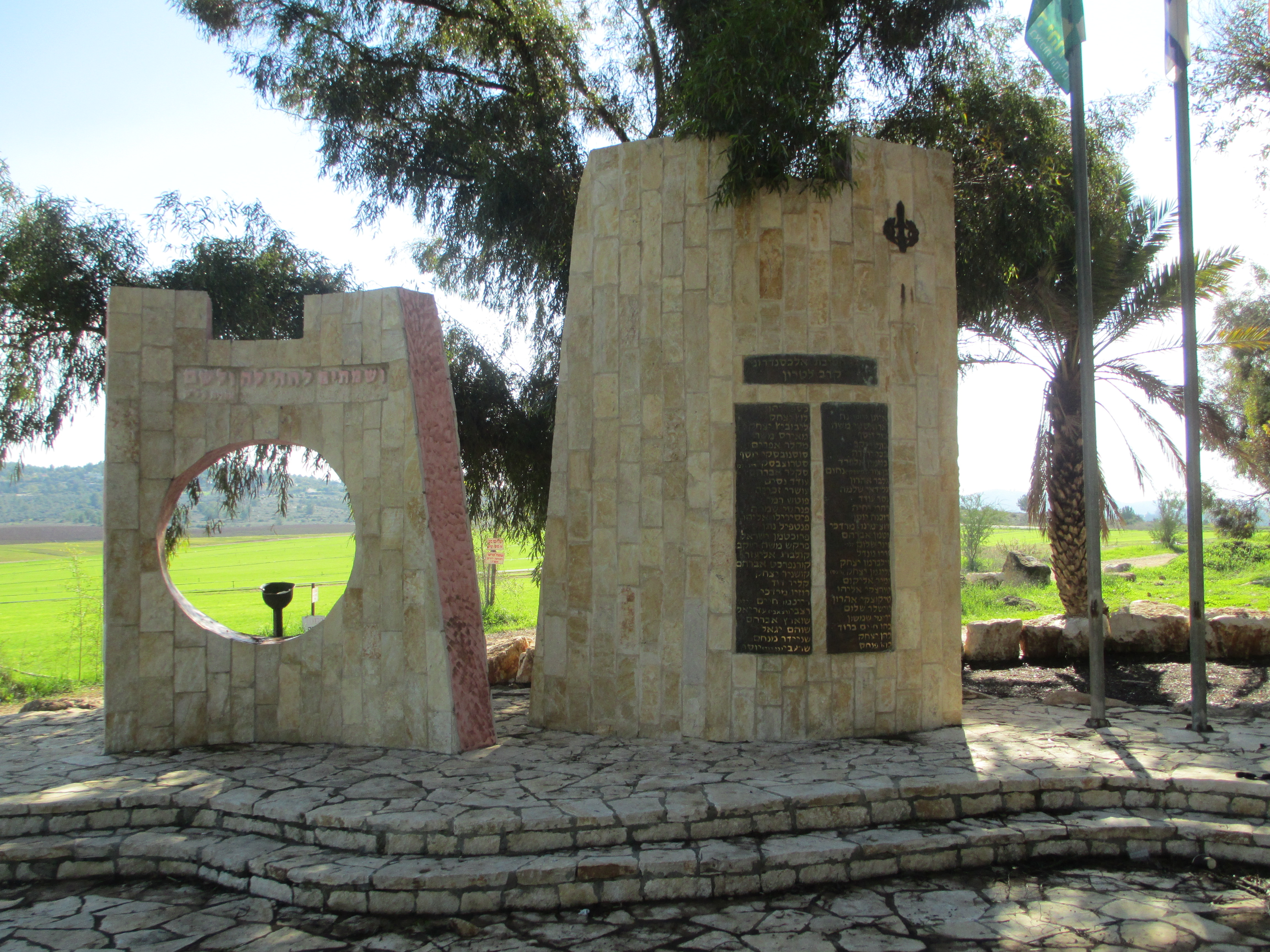
Alexandroni Brigade memorial overlooking Latrun police station

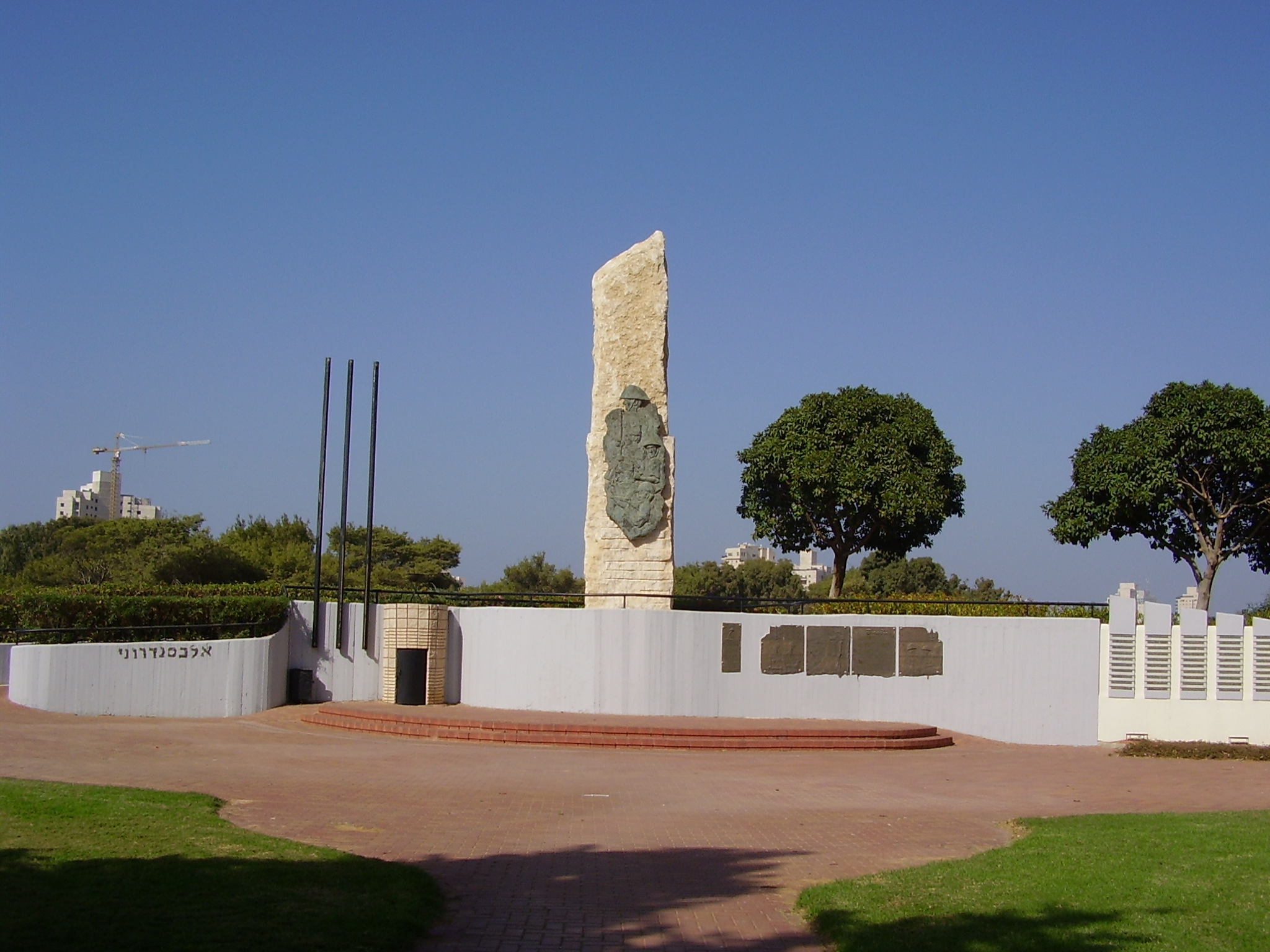
Alexandroni Brigade memorial in Netanya

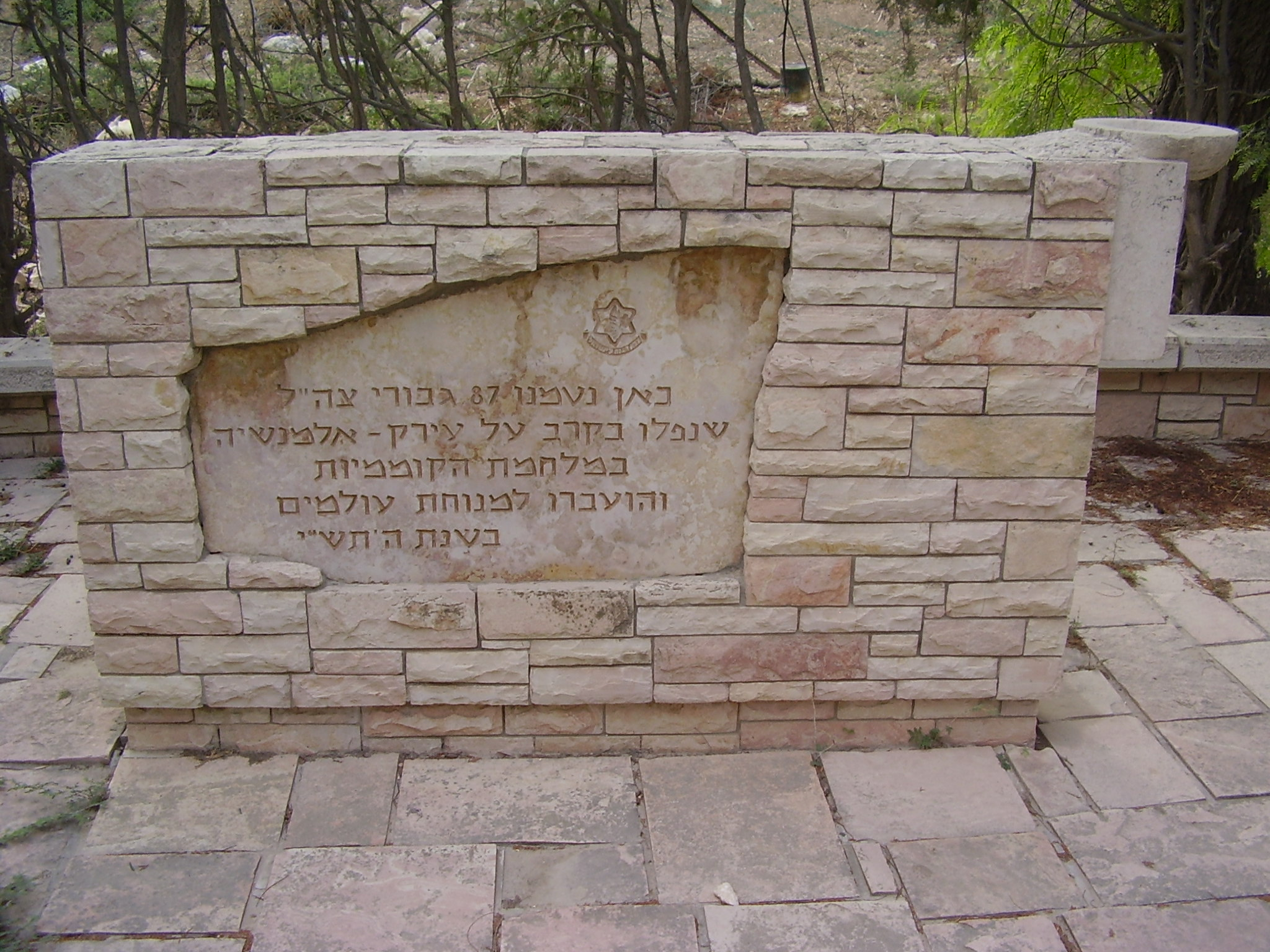
Mass grave of 87 Alexandroni soldiers fallen in the "Faluja Pocket" during the War of Independence, buried by the Egyptians and reburied in 1949 in Kiryat Gat

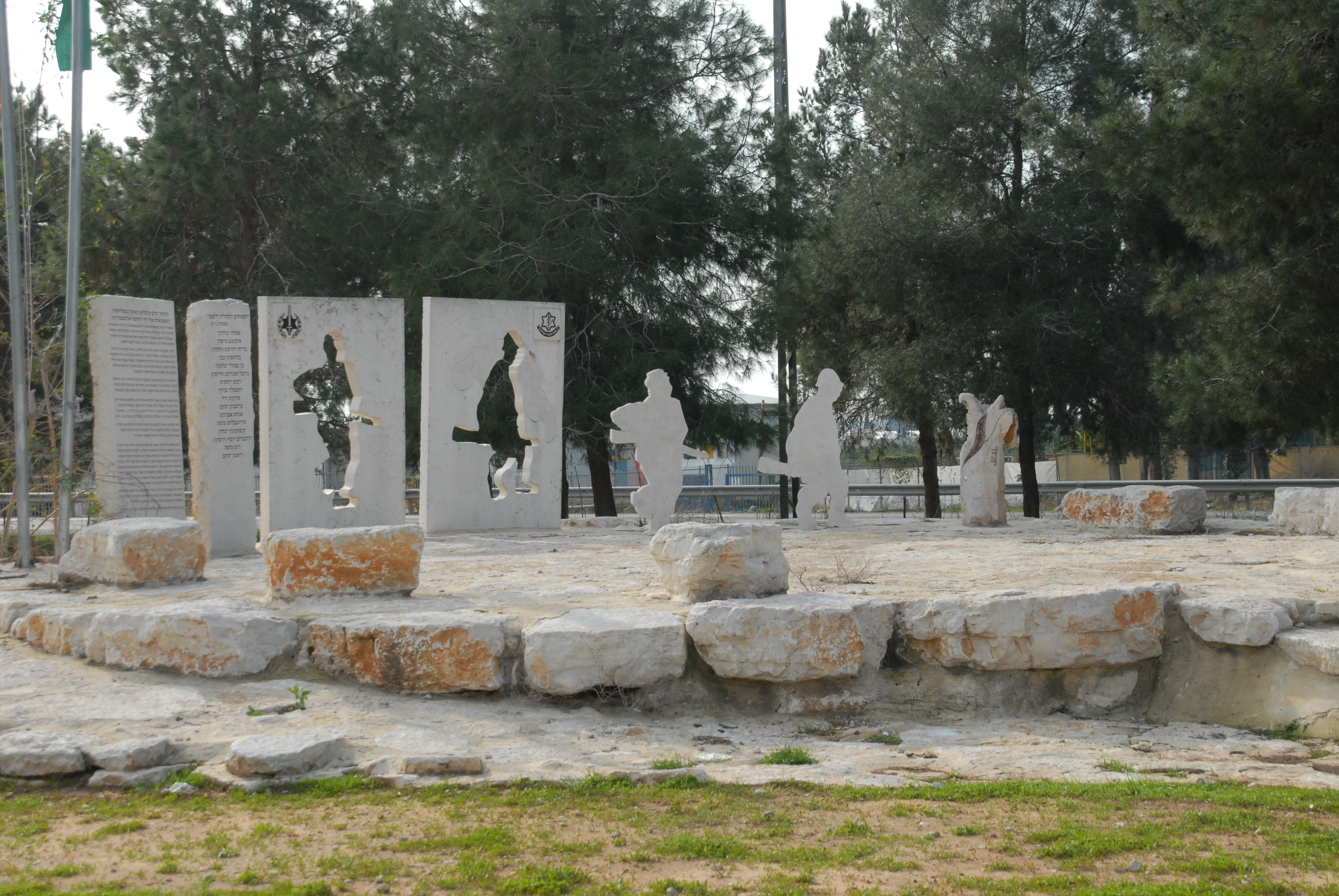
Memorial in Qaqun with Bible citation from Zephaniah 3:19

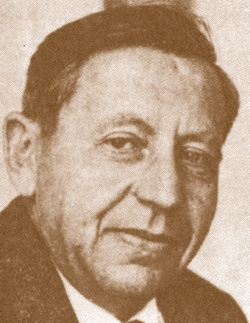
Dan Even (Epstein), commander of the Alexandroni Brigade

== See also ==
- God's Company (Israel)
