= Headstart (web) =

Israeli crowdfunding site

- Website type: Crowd funding
- Available in: Hebrew
- Headquarters: {{{location_country}}}
- Website: headstart.co.il
- Commercial: Yes

Headstart is an Israeli crowdfunding site for entrepreneurs. It was founded by Yossi Meiri and Yonatan Gal. They were inspired by Kickstarter.

== See also ==
- Comparison of crowd funding services
