= Neve Hadassah =

Youth village in central Israel

Neve Hadassah: נווה הדסה (Hebrew)
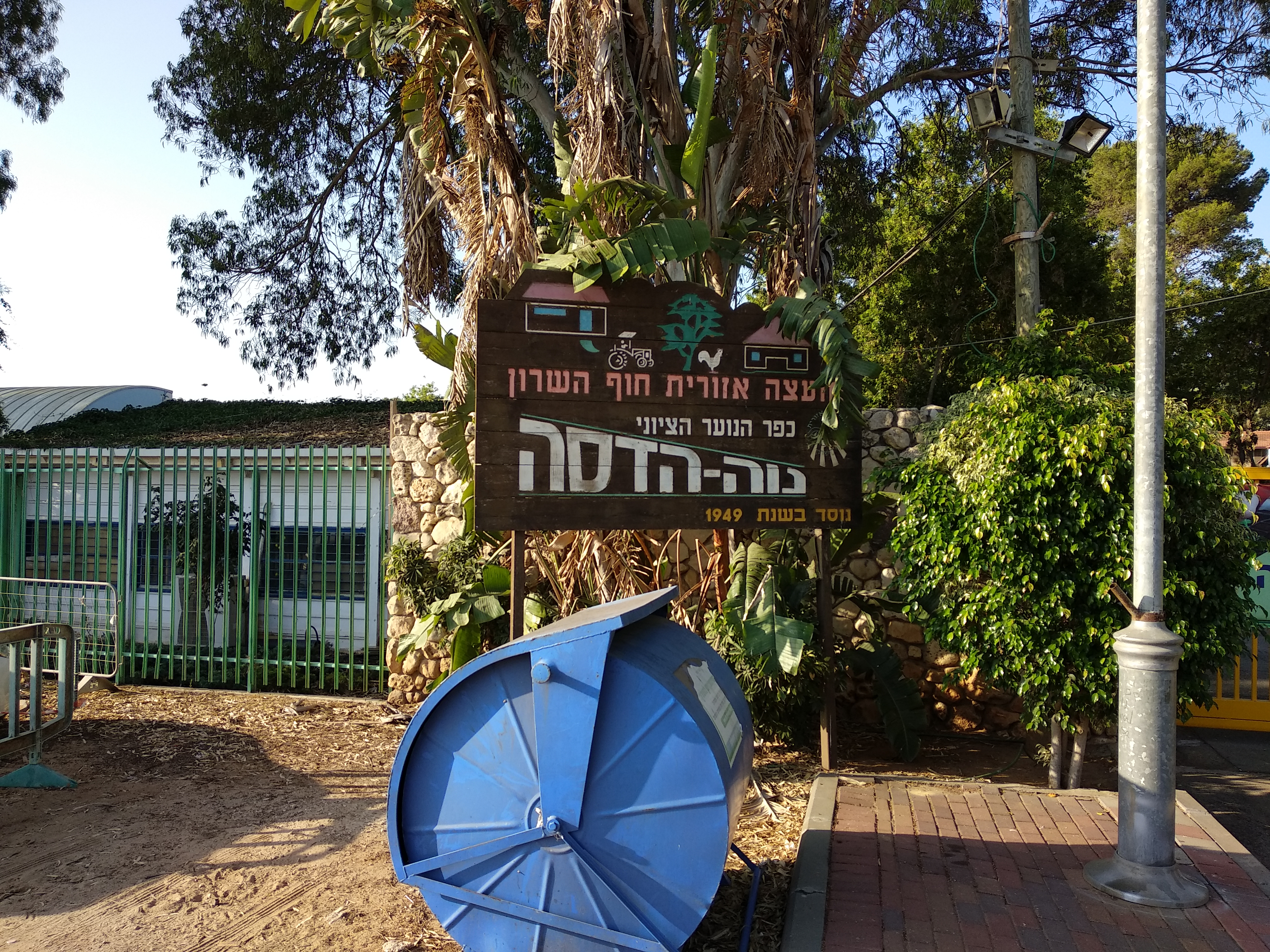
- Etymology: Hadassah Abode
- Location within Central Israel Location within Israel
- Coordinates: 32°15′3″N 34°52′32″E
- Country: Israel
- District: Central
- Subdistrict: HaSharon
- Council: Hof HaSharon
- Founded: 1949
- Population (2006): 668

Neve Hadassah (Hebrew: נווה הדסה, lit. 'Hadassah Abode') is a youth village in central Israel. Located in the Sharon plain near Netanya and adjacent to Tel Yitzhak, it falls under the jurisdiction of Hof HaSharon Regional Council. In 2006 it had a population of 668.

== History ==
The village was established in 1949 by Tel Yitzhak, Yesodot, Youth Aliyah, and Hadassah. It contains a boarding school and a school catering for pupils from seventh to twelfth grade. Over the years, the school has taught immigrants from Latin America, the former Soviet Union and France.
