= Well house (farmstead) =

Building constructed around a water well

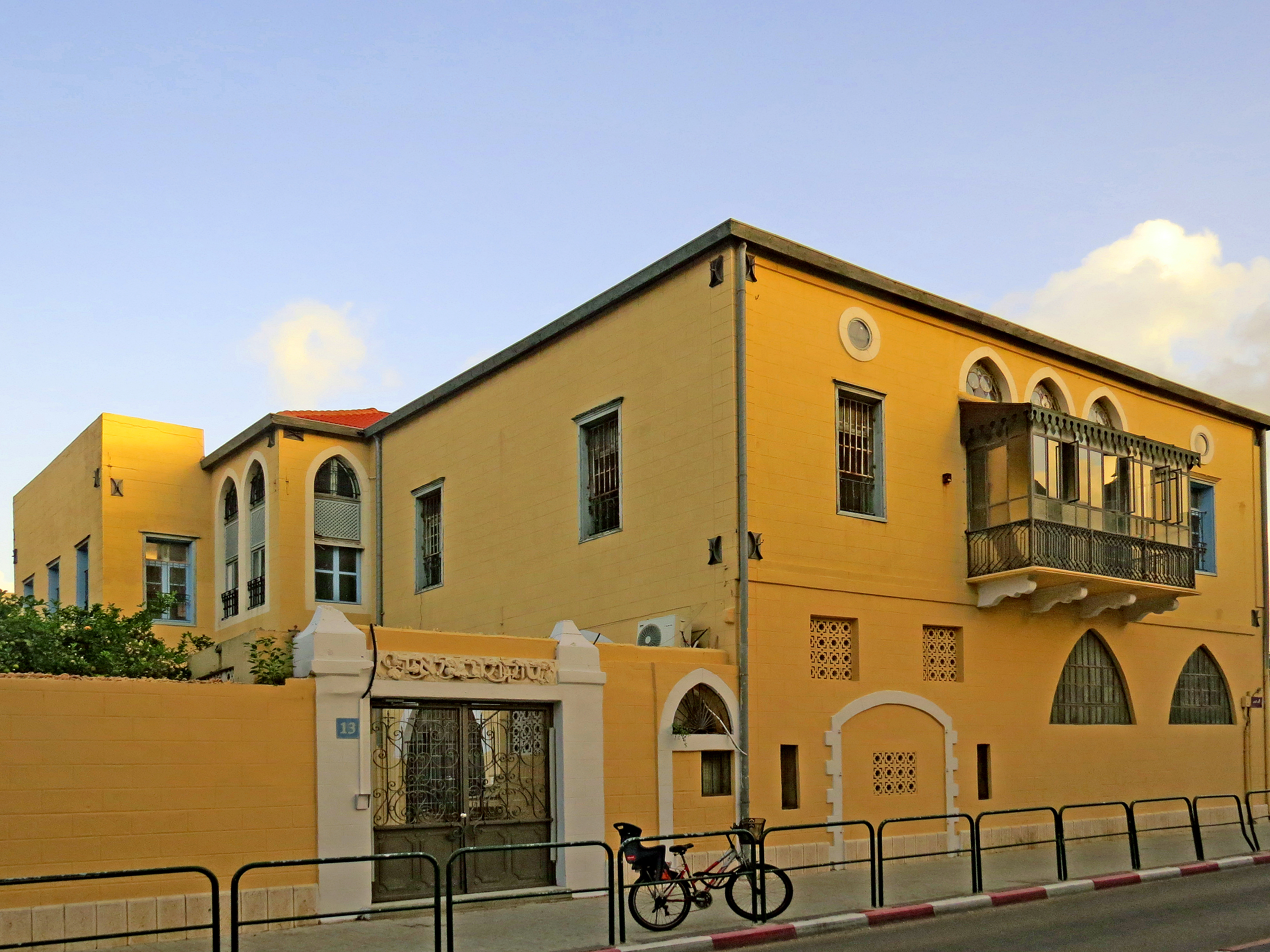
Ali Bibi House, Jaffa

Well houses (Arabic: Biara) were farmsteads established in the vicinity of orange groves in mid-19th century Palestine. In addition to luxury villas, the complex included a well, a water storage pool, a pumping system and irrigation channels.

== History ==
Well houses served as an integral part of Jaffa's citrus-grove culture and contributed to the city's growth. Each "house" was in effect a compound with accommodations for orchard workers, a water well, a reservoir and an irrigation system. Members of Jaffa's upper class converted a number of them into luxury mansions and summer homes.

As plantations grew up outside the walls of Jaffa, farmers built homes there, usually one-story buildings. Later, a second story was added, and sometimes separate residential units were built for the workers.

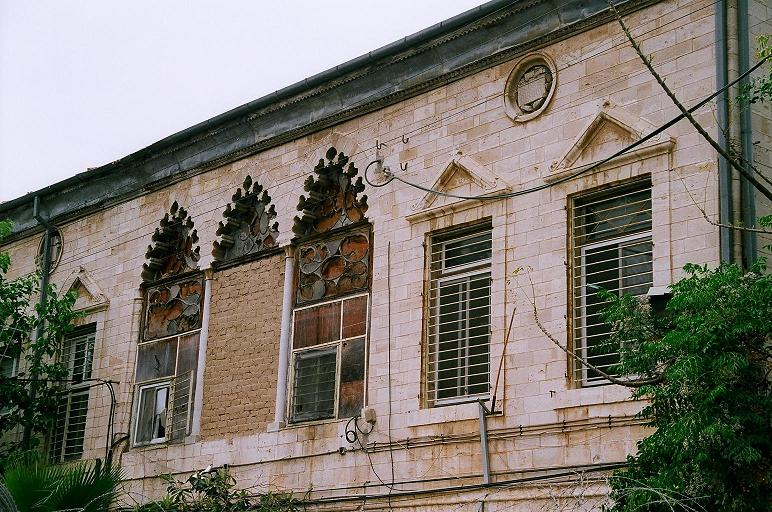
Well house in Tel Aviv

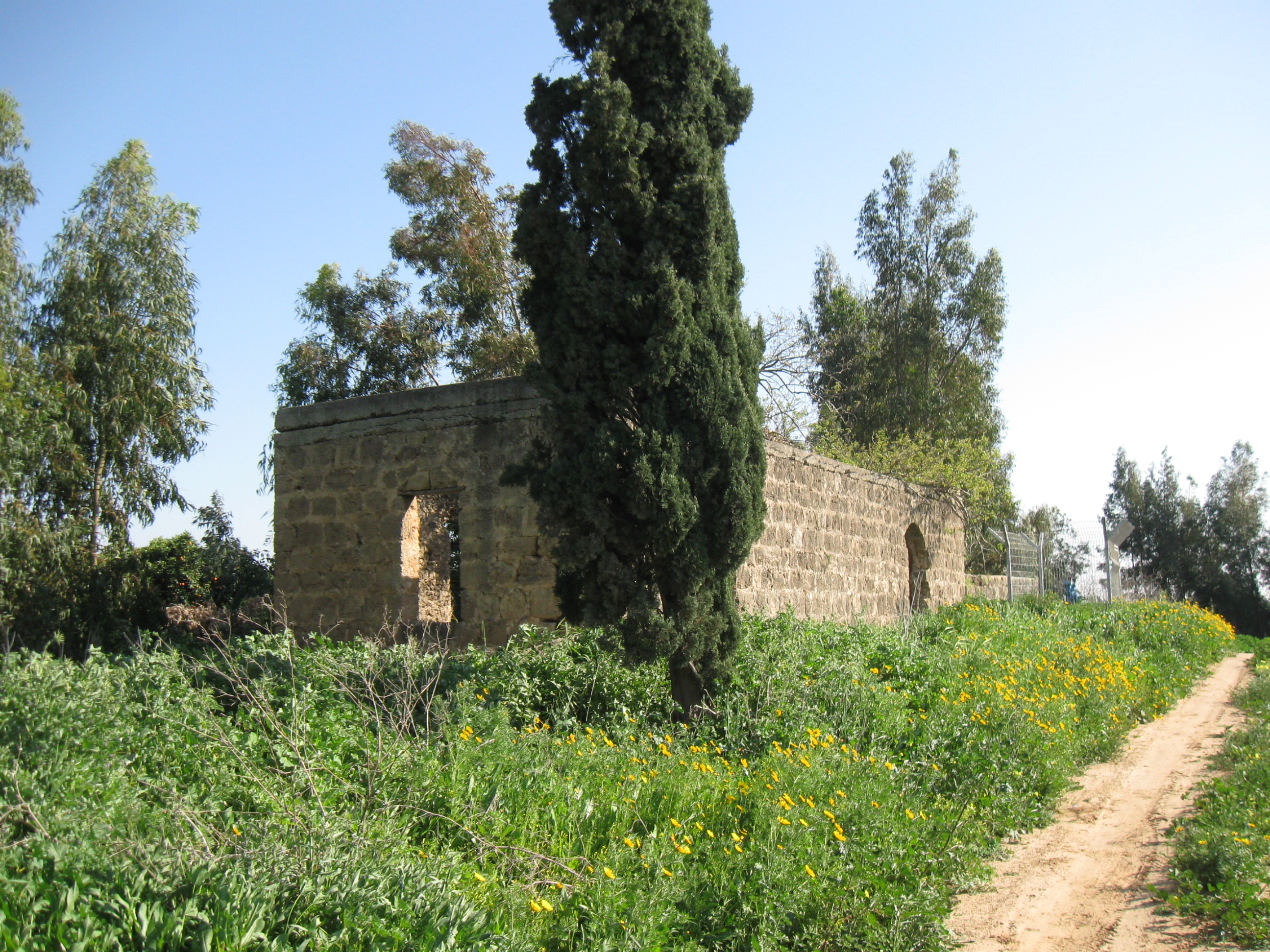
Well house near Bnei Zion

Well water was pumped through two sets of wheels—horizontal and vertical—moved by camels or mules. Modern systems were later established driven by diesel-powered engines. A storage pool would be established near the well, and water flowed to canals to irrigate the orchards, using gravity. Some wells were transferred to sebils established outside the walls.

== See also ==
- Architecture in Israel
- Jaffa orange
