= Metalink Ltd. =

Israeli hi-tech company

- Company type: Public
- Traded as: OTC Pink Current: MTLK; Nasdaq: MTLK
- Industry: Telecommunication; WLAN; Semiconductors
- Founded: 1992; 34 years ago
- Founder: Tzvika Shukhman
- Headquarters: Yakum, Israel
- Key people: Tzvika Shukhman (CEO)
- Products: WLAN IEEE 802.11n chipsets, DSL chipsets
- Number of employees: 160 (2007)

Metalink Ltd. was an Israeli-based hi-tech company specializing in silicon solutions for wireless and wireline broadband communications. Metalink offered integrated circuits and board level solutions targeting residential gateways, access points, routers, PC cards, set-top boxes (STB), digital media adapters (DMA) and wireless HDTVs. The products complied with IEEE 802.11n standard defining WLAN using Multiple-input multiple-output communications (MIMO). Other product lines included SDSL and VDSL products for triple-play services.

The company was headquartered in Yakum, Israel, with design centers in the US, Ukraine, and Taiwan.
