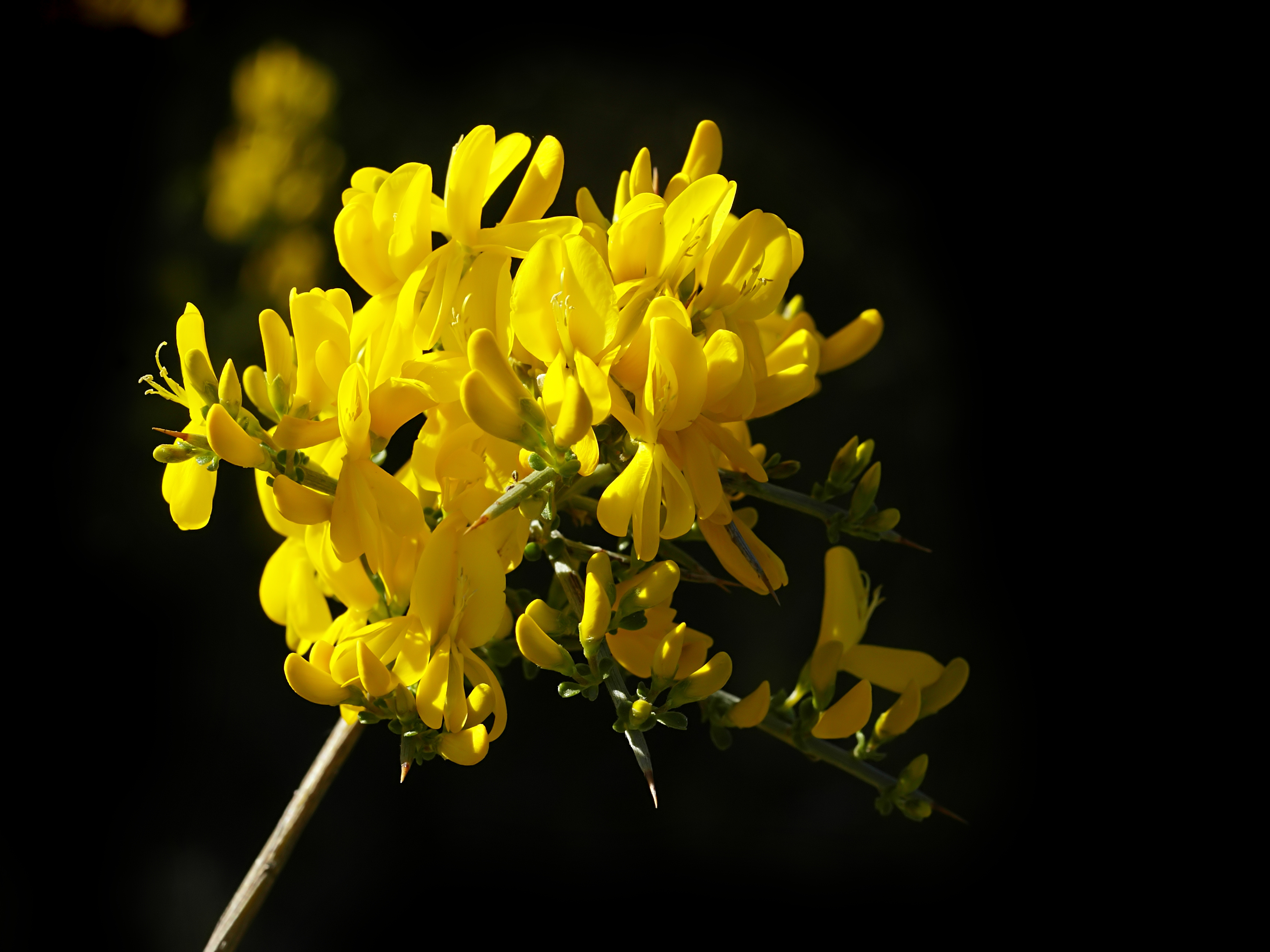

Scientific classification
- Kingdom: Plantae
- Clade: Tracheophytes
- Clade: Angiosperms
- Clade: Eudicots
- Clade: Rosids
- Order: Fabales
- Family: Fabaceae
- Subfamily: Faboideae
- Genus: Calicotome
- Species: C. spinosa

Binomial name
- Calicotome spinosa (L.) Link

= Calicotome spinosa =

Species of legume

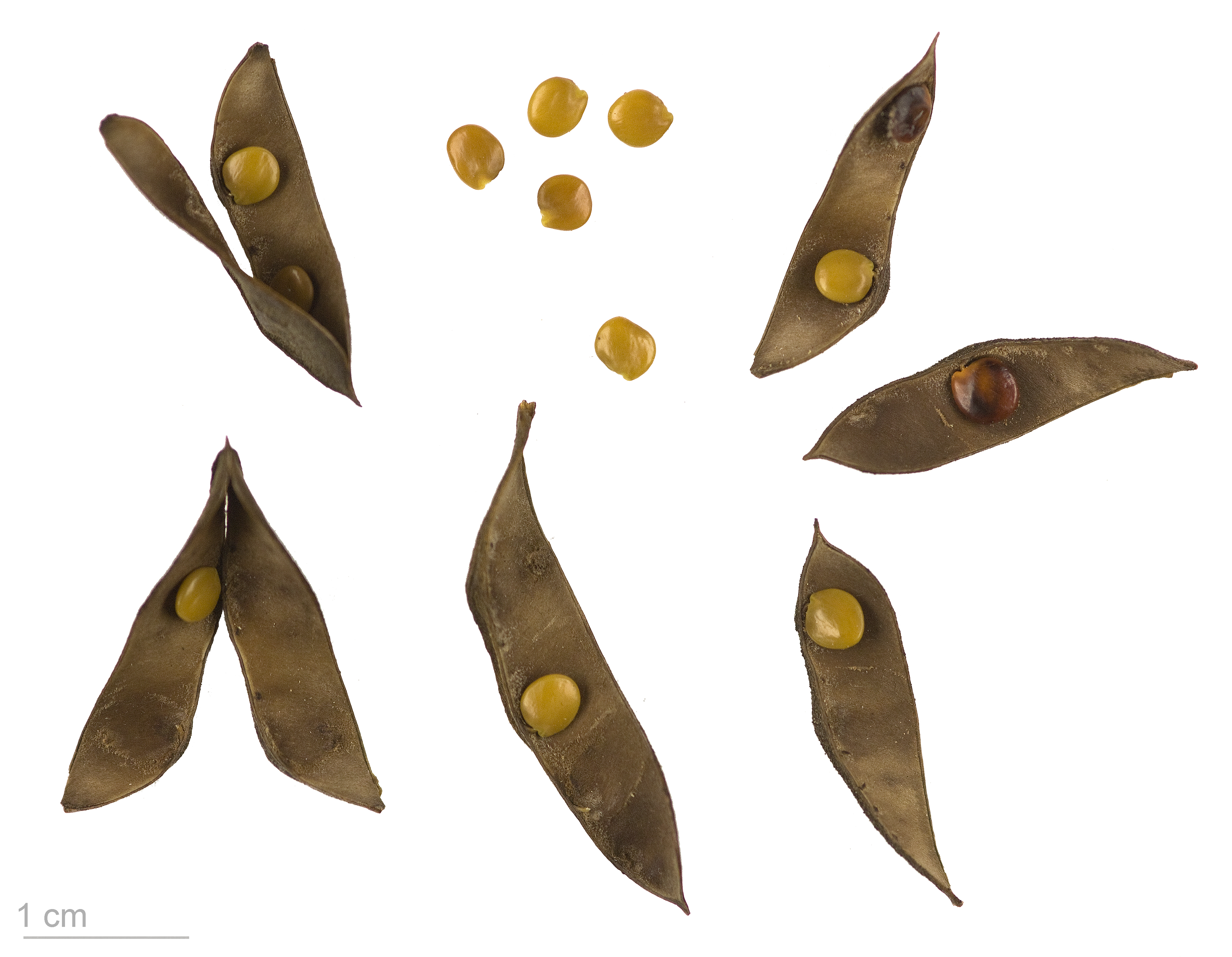
Calicotome spinosa - MHNT

Calicotome spinosa, the thorny broom or spiny broom, is a very spiny, densely branched shrub of the family Fabaceae which can reach up to three metres in height. It grows in the Western Mediterranean region on sunny slopes and dry, rocky ground. It is found in Spain, France, Italy, Croatia, Morocco, Tunisia, Libya, Algeria and Turkey, and it has been introduced to New Zealand. From March to June it produces bright yellow flowers which are borne singly or in small clusters. The seed-pods are 30mm long and are almost hairless, unlike those of the similar species Calicotome villosa.

== Plant usages in antiquity ==
The florets were used in ancient times to flavor sesame oil. Al-Tamimi, the physician (10th century), describing the process, writes that in Palestine it was commonly practiced to collect the yellow florets of the spiny broom (Arabic: القندول), spread them upon thickly woven sackcloth which laid out in the hot sun, pour over them hulled sesame seeds and cover them with linen sheets, while leaving them in this condition until the moisture in the florets has evaporated. In this manner, the sesame seeds would absorb the sweet fragrance of the florets. After one or two days, the florets and sesame seeds were then separated, the sesame placed on clean linen garments, being allowed to further dry-out from the moisture absorbed by the florets. This process was repeated up to 3 or 4 times, with a fresh batch of florets set out to dry, until at length the pungent flavor of the florets (resembling the taste of vanilla) had been fully imparted to the sesame seeds. The dried florets were then collected and pressed with the sesame seeds in order to produce a fragrant oil. The oil was formerly stored in glassware vessels, with just enough space left at the top to be sealed with the florets of the spiny broom. Today, the florets are still used by Bedouins to flavor butter.
