= Ga'ash =

Kibbutz in central Israel

Ga'ash: געש (Hebrew)
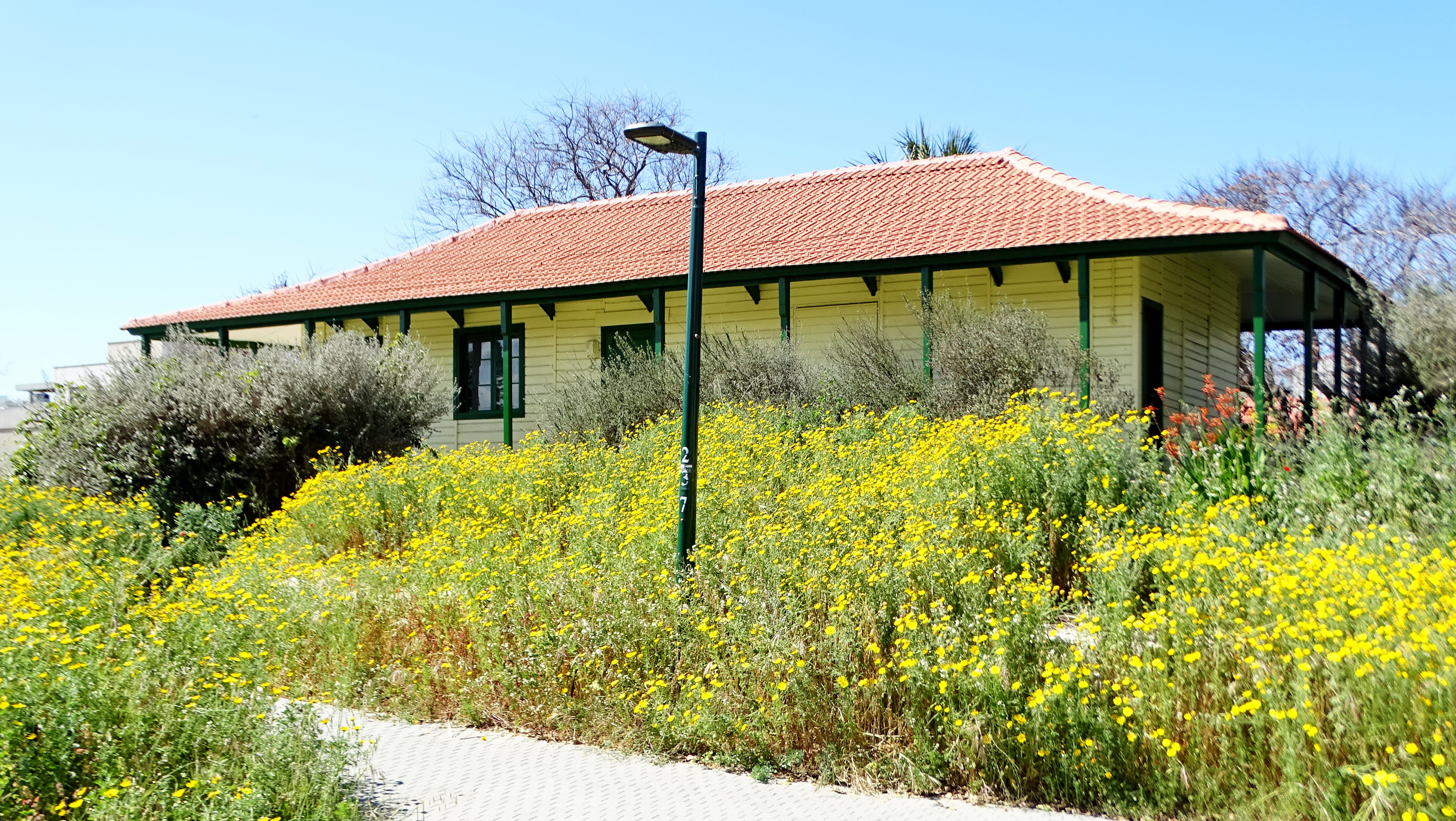
- Etymology: Storm
- Location within Central Israel Location within Israel
- Coordinates: 32°13′45″N 34°49′33″E
- Country: Israel
- District: Central
- Subdistrict: HaSharon
- Council: Hof HaSharon
- Affiliation: Kibbutz Movement
- Founded: 5 July 1951
- Founder: South American Hashomer Hatzair members
- Population (2024): 956
- Website: www.gaash.co.il

Ga'ash (Hebrew: געש, lit. 'Storm') is a kibbutz in central Israel. Located in the coastal plain to the north of Tel Aviv, it falls under the jurisdiction of Hof HaSharon Regional Council. In 2024 it had a population of 956.

== Etymology ==
The village was named after the Biblical mountain of Gaash, beside the grave of Joshuah in Ephraim (Joshuah 24:30).

== History ==
The kibbutz was established on 5 July 1951 on the village lands of the depopulated Palestinian village of Khirbat al-Zababida, where, according to the Mandatory records from 1945, Jews owned 45% of the land, Palestinians 43% and the remaining 12% were publicly owned.

The founding members were immigrants from South America who were members of the Latin America "A Group" of Hashomer Hatzair. The founders had defended Negba during the 1948 Arab–Israeli War, and had formed the kibbutz community at Ahli Kahsem near Bnei Zion in November 1949.
