= Zababida =

== Israel or Palestine ==
- Wadi Ara, Haifa, formerly Khirbet es Zebadneh (as on SWP map 8)
- Khirbat al-Zababida, SWP map 10
- Zababdeh, SWP map 12
