= Udim =

Moshav in central Israel

Udim: אוּדִים (Hebrew)
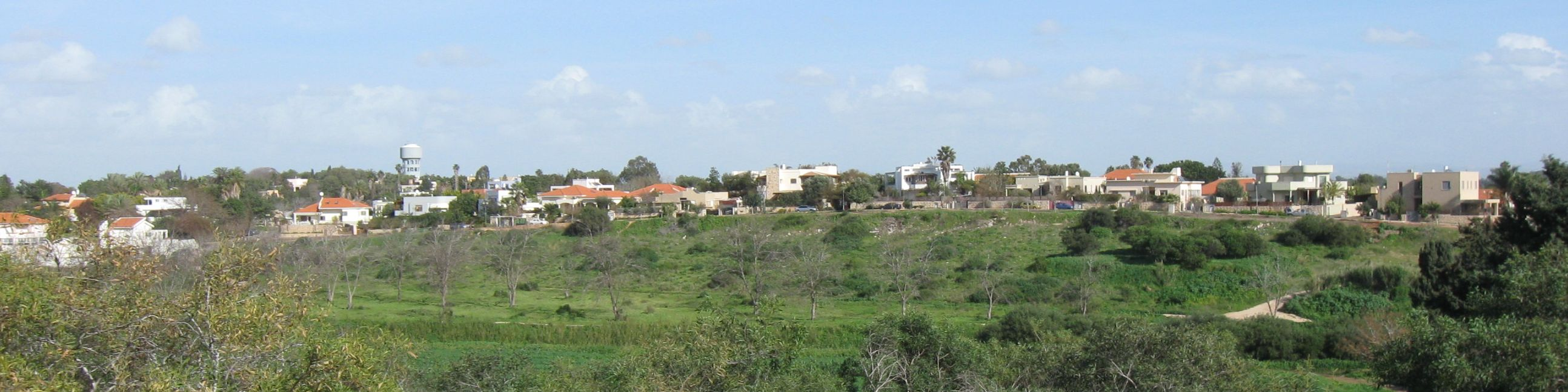

- Location within Central Israel
- Coordinates: 32°15′59″N 34°51′5″E
- Country: Israel
- District: Central
- Subdistrict: HaSharon
- Council: Hof HaSharon
- Affiliation: Agricultural Union
- Founded: 1948
- Founder: Holocaust survivors
- Population (2024): 1,167

Udim (Hebrew: אוּדִים, lit. Firebrands) is a moshav in central Israel. Located near Netanya, it falls under the jurisdiction of Hof HaSharon Regional Council. In 2024 it had a population of 1,167.

== History ==
The area of Udim lies within the southern Sharon plain, historically part of the Forest of Sharon. Until the 20th century the land was associated with the Palestinian village of Ghabat Kafr Sur and nearby hamlets, and was characterized by oak woodlands, seasonal cultivation, and grazing lands. In the late Ottoman and Mandate periods, intensification of farming in the coastal plain led to deforestation and environmental degradation.

Udim was founded in 1948 by Holocaust survivors who had immigrated to Mandatory Palestine in the aftermath of World War II. Its name, meaning "firebrands," was taken from the Book of Zechariah (3:2), symbolizing the settlers as survivors rescued from destruction:

“And the LORD said unto Satan: 'The LORD rebuke thee, O Satan; yea, the LORD that hath chosen Jerusalem rebuke thee; is not this man a brand plucked out of the fire?’”

The moshav was established partly on lands of depopulated Palestinian villages in the Sharon coastal plain, including Khirbat al-Zababida and associated lands near Wadi al-Falik.

In its early years, Udim’s economy was based on mixed farming—citrus, vegetables, and poultry—supported by state institutions assisting new immigrant settlements. Over time, many residents found employment in nearby Netanya and Tel Aviv, and the moshav developed into a suburban-rural community while retaining agricultural activity.

== Nature reserve ==
South-east of the moshav is the **Udim Nature Reserve**, first declared in 1967 and expanded in 1997 to cover 140 dunams. The reserve was established in a disused quarry where the water table rose, creating a unique wetland habitat. It is notable for its concentration of aquatic and riparian flora, including Salix acmophylla and Tamarix trees, Rubus sanguineus, reeds, and cattails. The reserve is also a habitat for migratory birds and amphibians, representing an important ecological pocket within the heavily developed Sharon region.
