= Coleophora calycotomella =

Scientific classification
- Kingdom: Animalia
- Phylum: Arthropoda
- Class: Insecta
- Order: Lepidoptera
- Family: Coleophoridae
- Genus: Coleophora
- Species: C. calycotomella

Binomial name
- Coleophora calycotomella Stainton, 1869

Synonyms
- Coleophora afra Toll, 1952; Coleophora cuencella Toll, 1960; Coleophora oranella Toll, 1952; Coleophora paraobviella Toll, 1961

Species of moth

Coleophora calycotomella is a moth of the family Coleophoridae. It is found from the Netherlands and Germany to the Iberian Peninsula, Sardinia, Sicily and Crete.

The wingspan is 11.5–15 mm (0.45–0.59 in).

The larvae feed on Adenocarpus, Calicotome and common broom (Cytisus scoparius). Full-grown larvae can be found in March and May.
