= Harutzim =

Community settlement in central Israel

Harutzim: חָרוּצִים (Hebrew)
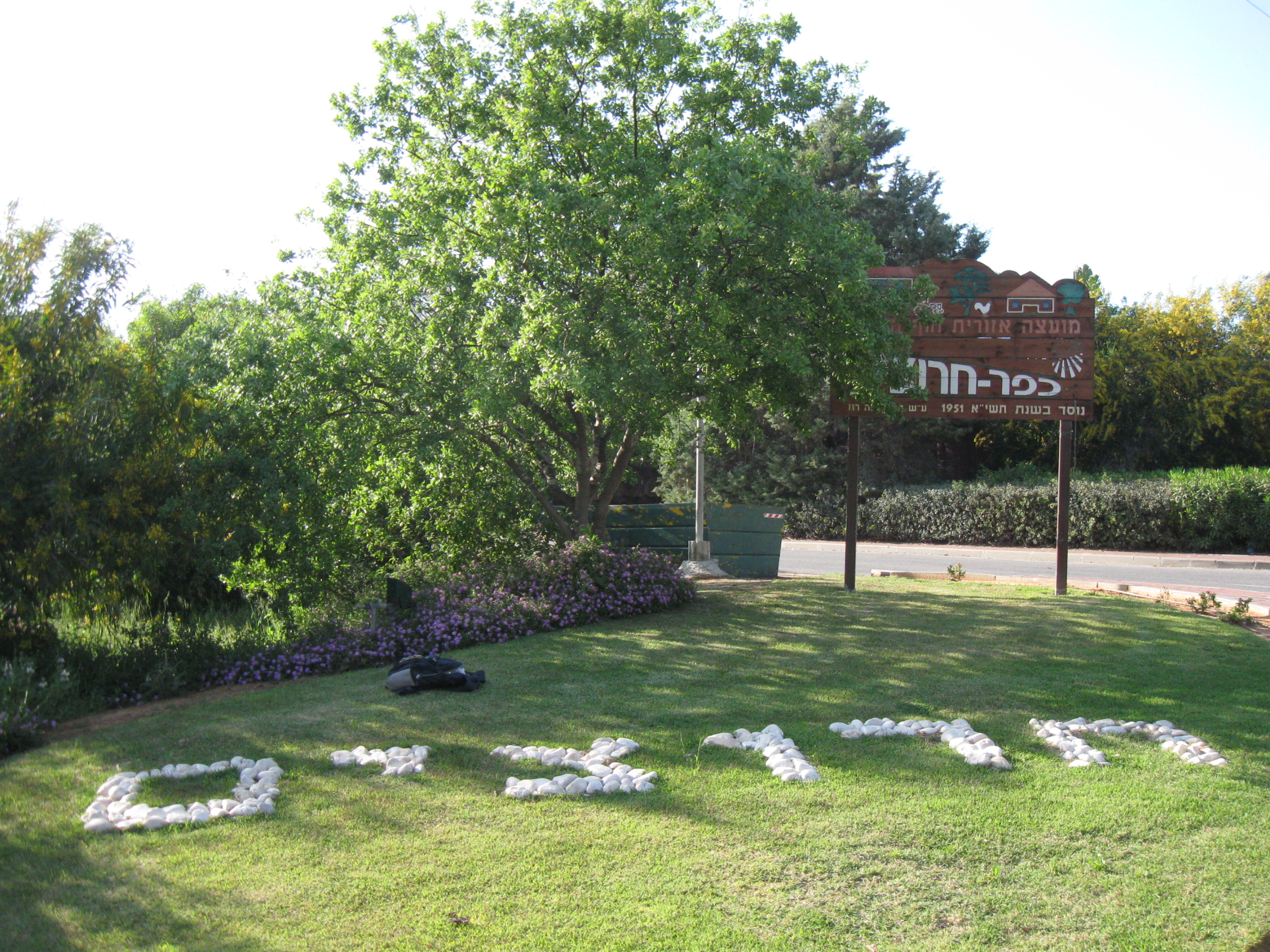

- Location within Central Israel
- Coordinates: 32°13′39″N 34°51′53″E
- Country: Israel
- District: Central
- Subdistrict: HaSharon
- Council: Hof HaSharon
- Affiliation: Moshavim Movement
- Founded: 1951
- Founder: Israeli veterans and new immigrants
- Population (2024): 751

Harutzim (Hebrew: חָרוּצִים, lit. 'Diligents') is a community settlement in central Israel. Located in the Sharon plain near Ra'anana, it falls under the jurisdiction of Hof HaSharon Regional Council. In 2024 it had a population of 751.

== History ==
The region of Harutzim lies in the southern Sharon plain, which before the 20th century formed part of the Forest of Sharon. This woodland, dominated by Mount Tabor oak, extended from Kfar Yona in the north to Ra'anana in the south. Local Arab inhabitants traditionally used the land for pasture, seasonal cultivation, and firewood. During the 19th century, population growth and expanding agriculture led to widescale deforestation and environmental degradation.

Harutzim was established in 1951, in the aftermath of the 1948 Arab–Israeli War. The founders included Israeli veterans and new Jewish immigrants, who sought to create a semi-cooperative rural community in the Sharon region. Its name derives from a verse in the Book of Proverbs (10:4): "The hand of the diligents makes rich," symbolizing industry and perseverance.

== Economy ==
In its early years, Harutzim’s economy was based on small-scale agriculture, orchards, and poultry farming, typical of Sharon plain settlements. From the late 20th century onwards, many residents began working in nearby Ra’anana, Herzliya, and Tel Aviv, transforming Harutzim into a suburban-style community settlement while retaining some rural character.
