= Tel Yitzhak =

Kibbutz in central Israel

Tel Yitzhak: תֵּל יִצְחָק (Hebrew)
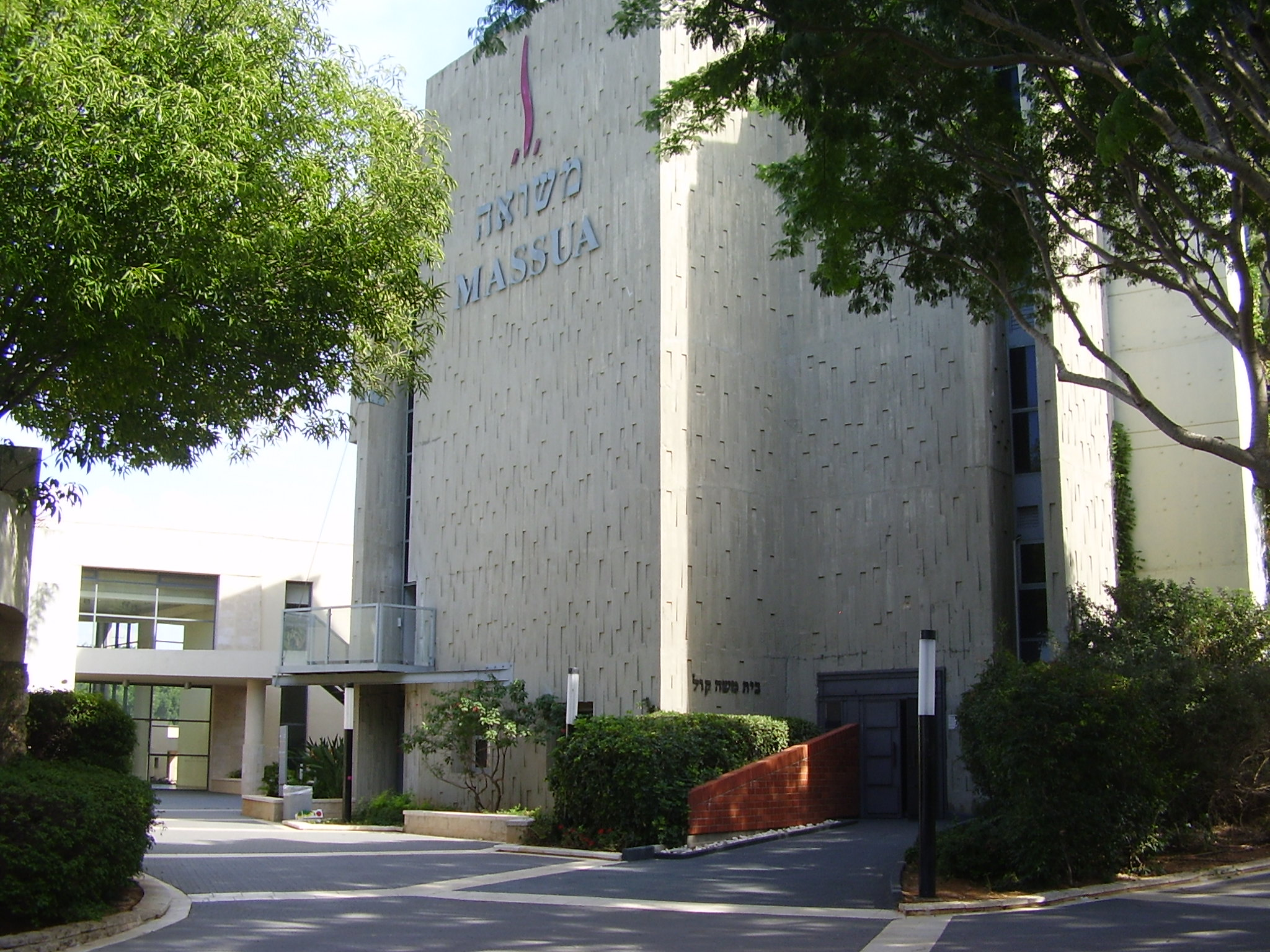

- Location within Central Israel
- Coordinates: 32°15′9″N 34°52′9″E
- Country: Israel
- District: Central
- Subdistrict: HaSharon
- Council: Hof HaSharon
- Affiliation: HaOved HaTzioni
- Founded: 1938
- Founder: Galician Jews
- Population (2024): 1,055

Tel Yitzhak (Hebrew: תֵּל יִצְחָק, lit. 'Isaac Hill') is a kibbutz in central Israel. Located in the coastal plain to the south-east of Netanya, it falls under the jurisdiction of Hof HaSharon Regional Council. In 2024 it had a population of 1,055.

== History ==
The region of Tel Yitzhak, bordering the wetlands of the Poleg stream, has been inhabited intermittently since the Middle Paleolithic age, with peak periods of settlement during the Middle and Late Bronze Age, the Byzantine, and Late Ottoman periods. The area formed part of the historic Forest of Sharon (an open woodland dominated by Mount Tabor Oak, which extended from Kfar Yona in the north to Ra'anana in the south) and belonged to Ghabat Kafr Sur. The Arab inhabitants traditionally used the area for pasture, firewood and intermittent cultivation. However, the intensification of settlement and agriculture in the coastal plain during the 19th century led to deforestation and subsequent environmental degradation.

The kibbutz was established in 1938 by General Zionist immigrants from Galicia as part of the tower and stockade settlement campaign. It was named after Yitzhak Steiger, a leader of HaNoar HaTzioni in Galicia.

In the 1940s Tel Yitzhak hosted one of the printing presses of the newspaper Haaretz. After the establishment of the State of Israel, it developed mixed farming, including citrus orchards, poultry, and dairy production.

Masua (Massuah), a center for Holocaust research, commemoration, and youth education, was established on the kibbutz in the 1970s and later became an official institution supported by the Israeli Ministry of Education. It serves as a major Holocaust education center for school groups and soldiers.

== Economy and culture ==
Like many kibbutzim, Tel Yitzhak underwent processes of privatization from the 1990s onward, introducing differential wages and leasing agricultural land to private farmers. Today its economy combines agriculture, light industry, and services, while also hosting cultural and educational programs connected with Masua.

== Nature reserve ==
Southwest of the kibbutz is an 8-dunam nature reserve established in 1968 to protect flora and fauna native to the Sharon plain. Flora includes Ceratonia siliqua, Calicotome villosa, Thymelaea hirsuta, Prasium majus, Anagyris, and Lavandula stoechas. The reserve preserves remnants of the once extensive oak woodlands of the Sharon.

== Historic images ==
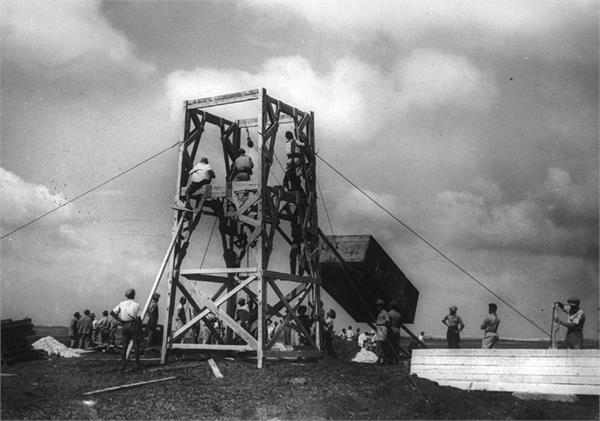
Tel Yitzhak construction of watchtower 1938

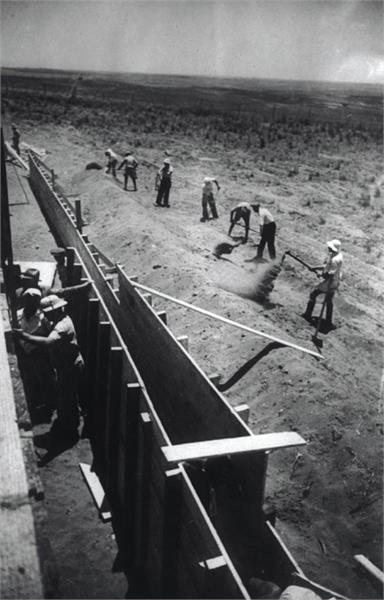
Tel Yitzhak construction of wall, July 1938

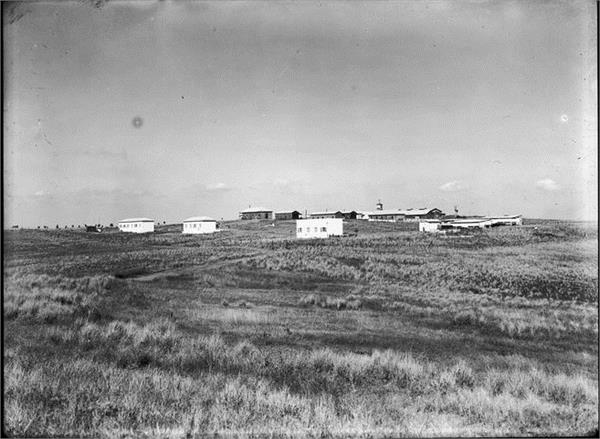
Tel Yitzhak 1939

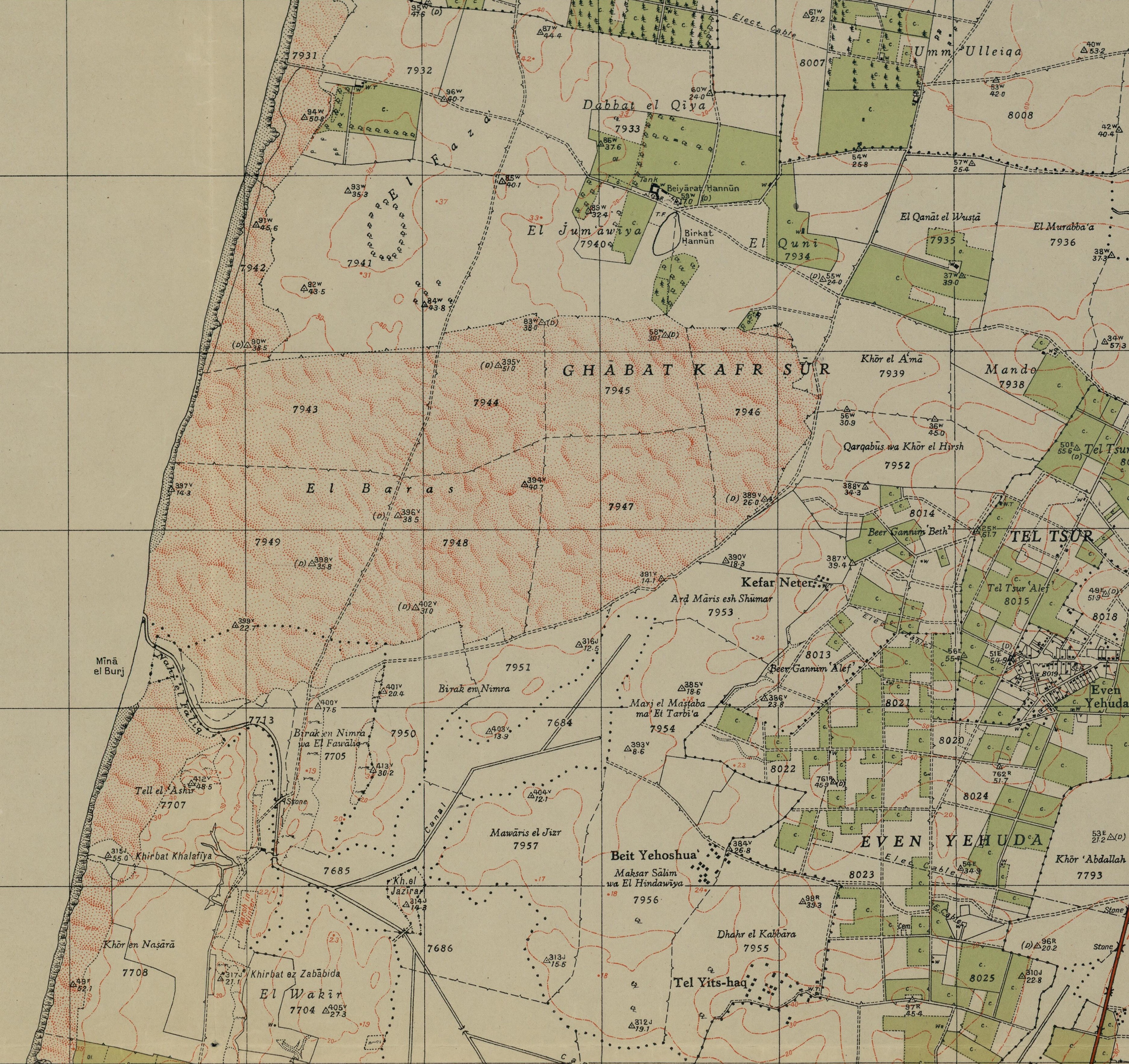
Tel Yitzhak 1944 1:20,000 (bottom right quadrant: Tel Yitzhak)
