= Yakum =

Kibbutz in central Israel

Yakum: יָקוּם (Hebrew)
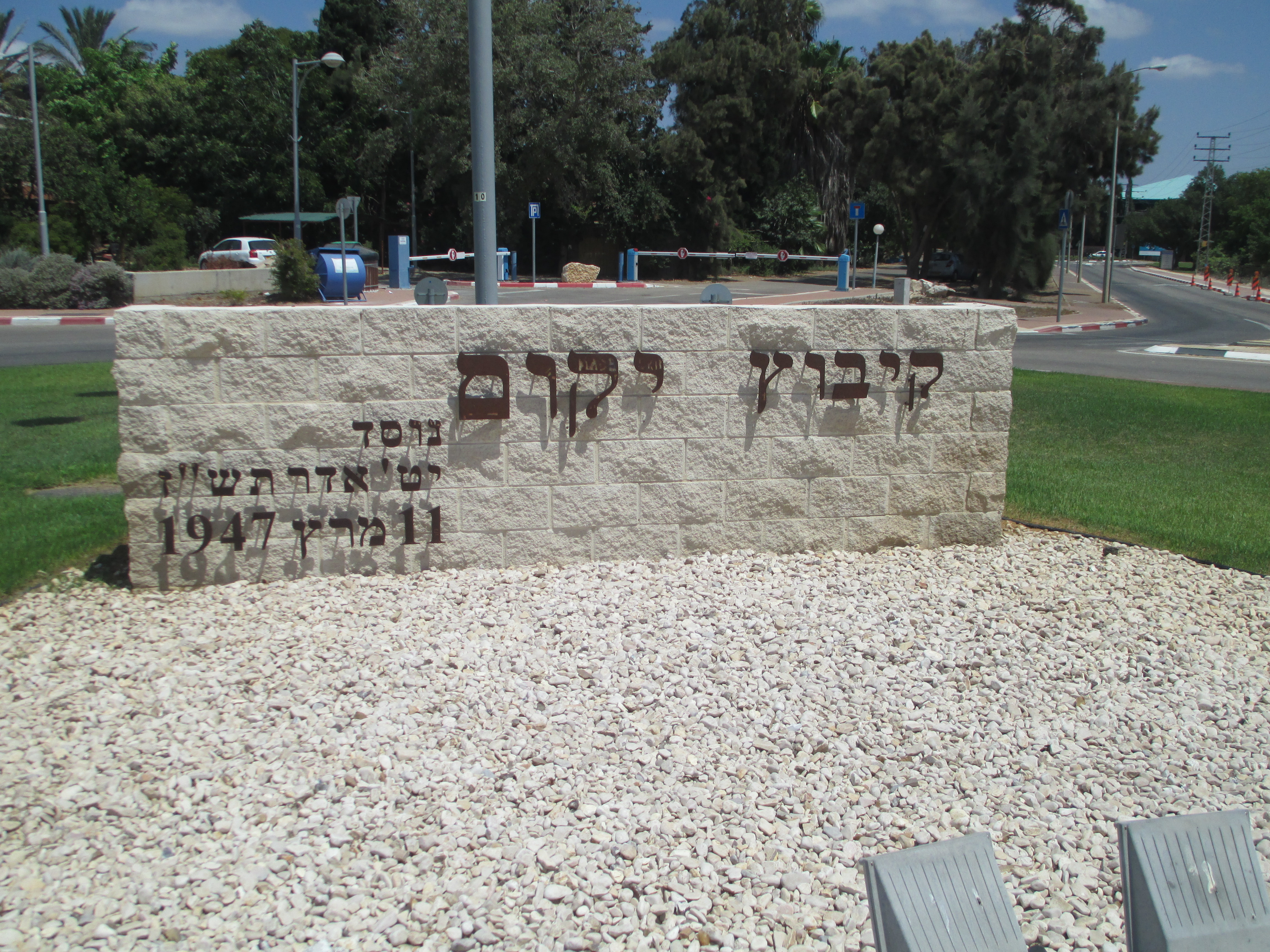
- Kibbutz entrance

- Location within Central Israel
- Coordinates: 32°14′51″N 34°50′33″E
- Country: Israel
- District: Central
- Subdistrict: HaSharon
- Council: Hof HaSharon
- Affiliation: Kibbutz Movement
- Founded: 1938
- Founder: German Jewish refugees
- Population (2024): 790
- Website: www.yakum.co.il

Yakum (Hebrew: יָקוּם, lit. "He (The People) shall rise") is a kibbutz in central Israel. Located in the central part of the Israeli coastal plain, about 30 km north of Tel Aviv, and only 5 km from the southern suburbs of Netanya, it falls under the jurisdiction of Hof HaSharon Regional Council. In 2024 it had a population of 790. It was affiliated with Kibbutz Artzi.

== History ==
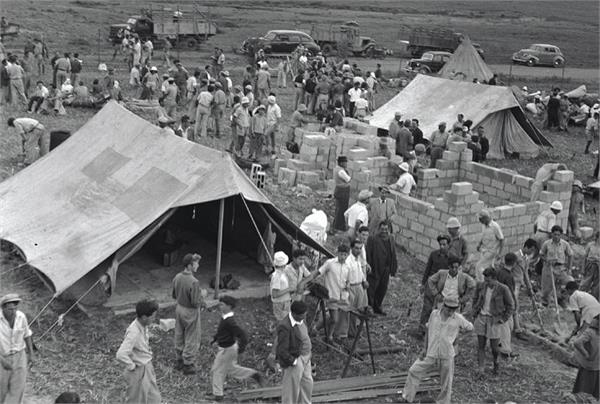
Yakum. 11 March 1947

The region of Yakum lies in the historic Sharon plain, once covered by extensive oak woodlands. In the late Ottoman and Mandate periods, intensification of agriculture and settlement led to deforestation and land-use changes in the Sharon region.

In 1934 a group of young German immigrants, many of them Jewish refugees from Nazism, gathered at Ein Harod to form the nucleus of a future kibbutz. In 1938 the group organized as Kibbutz Eretz-Israel Dalet in Hadera, though without a permanent land allocation. During the 1930s–1940s, they were joined by groups of immigrants from Germany, Hungary, and Poland, who trained in agricultural work at settlements in the Galilee such as Yavne'el.

In 1947 the kibbutz was formally established on the Poleg Stream, on land that had belonged to the depopulated Palestinian village of Khirbat al-Zababida. The Central Naming Committee chose the name "Yakum", which the members initially opposed, but their appeal was rejected.

During the 1947–1948 Civil War in Mandatory Palestine, Yakum members were involved in defense and clandestine arms production. A small underground workshop produced parts for Sten guns, supplying the Haganah.

== Economy ==
In its early years Yakum depended on citrus groves, dairy cattle, field crops, and mining of local "zif-zif" sands used in construction. Agriculture remained central until 1964, when the kibbutz established its first plastics factory, "Plastiv", marking the start of industrial diversification.

By the 1970s–1980s Yakum had signed contracts with international firms such as Reid Plastics and Elopak for manufacturing plastic containers and caps. From the 1990s the kibbutz underwent privatization, shifting toward real estate and service industries.

Today Yakum’s economy is based on industry, commercial ventures, and leasing of land for projects such as the Europark business complex, while many members also work in external companies.

== Culture and education ==
Yakum hosts the Yad Recha Freier Cultural Center, named after Recha Freier, founder of the Youth Aliyah movement. The center serves as a venue for concerts, theater, and educational programs, and houses the Youth Aliyah Orchestra.

== Volunteers ==
Since the late 1960s Yakum has hosted thousands of international volunteers, especially from Europe and Latin America. Many volunteers formed lasting ties with kibbutz members, and some settled permanently, reflecting the kibbutz movement’s role in cultural exchange and solidarity with foreign youth movements.

== Notable people ==
- Zvi Eckstein, economist and former Deputy Governor of the Bank of Israel.
