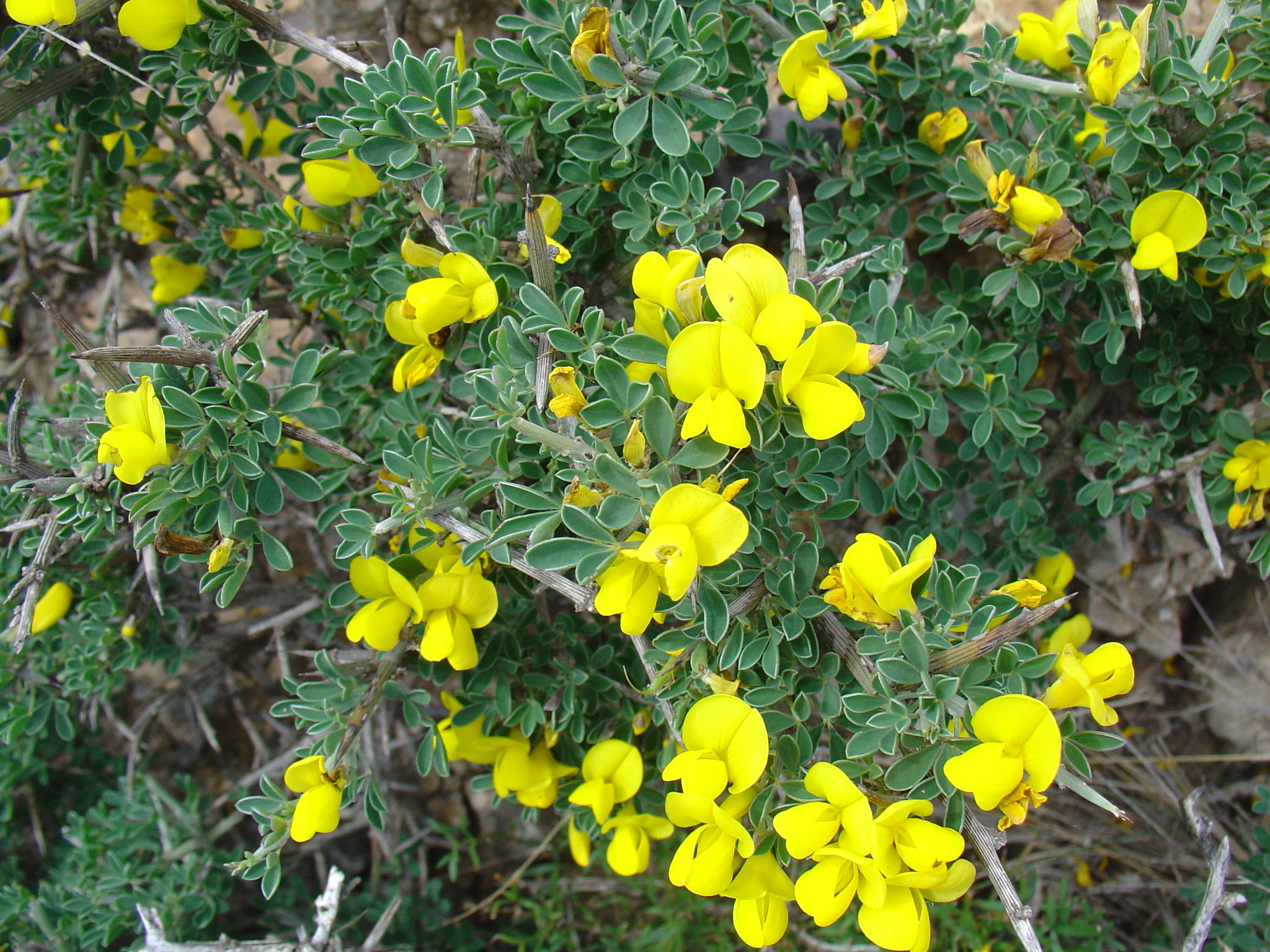
- Calicotome infesta subsp. intermedia

Scientific classification
- Kingdom: Plantae
- Clade: Tracheophytes
- Clade: Angiosperms
- Clade: Eudicots
- Clade: Rosids
- Order: Fabales
- Family: Fabaceae
- Subfamily: Faboideae
- Genus: Calicotome
- Species: C. infesta

Binomial name
- Calicotome infesta (C.Presl) Guss.

= Calicotome infesta =

Species of flowering plant

Calicotome infesta is a species of shrubby flowering plant in the genus Calicotome, which is part of the Fabaceae family. It is native to Spain (Balearic islands), Italy (mainland, including Sicily) and countries of the Northwest Balkan Peninsula.

== Taxonomy ==
The species was first described by Carl Borivoj Presl in 1822 as Spartium infestum. It was later transferred to the genus Calicotome by Giovanni Gussone in 1844 under its current binomial name.
