= Hof HaSharon Regional Council =

Israeli regional council

Hof HaSharon Regional Council מועצה אזורית חוף השרון
- Regional council
- Interactive map of Hof HaSharon Regional Council
- Coordinates: 32°13′59″N 34°52′01″E
- Country: Israel
- District: Central
- Subdistrict: HaSharon
- Natural region: Western Sharon, Tel Aviv
- Founded: 1949

Government
  - Head of Municipality: Eli Malka

Area
  - Total: 47,485 dunams (47.485 km^{2}; 18.334 sq mi)

Population (2014)
  - Total: 14,400
  - Density: 303/km^{2} (785/sq mi)
- Website: hof-hasharon.co.il

Hof HaSharon Regional Council (Hebrew: מועצה אזורית חוף השרון, Mo'atza Azorit Hof HaSharon, lit. Sharon Coast Regional Council), is a regional council in the Central and Tel Aviv districts of Israel. It is located on the coastline in the Sharon area between Netanya and Herzliya.

The offices of the local authority are located in kibbutz Shefayim, as is the joint middle school and high school.

Before the 20th century, the territory of Hof HaSharon Regional Council formed the south-western part of the Forest of Sharon, a hallmark of the region's historical landscape. It was an open woodland dominated by Mount Tabor Oak (Quercus ithaburensi), which extended from Kfar Yona in the north to Ra'anana in the south. The local Arab inhabitants traditionally used the area for pasture, firewood and intermittent cultivation. The intensification of settlement and agriculture in the coastal plain during the 19th century led to deforestation and subsequent environmental degradation known from Hebrew sources.

It was established in 1949 and govern 14 communities and an educational institute (Neve Hadasa).

== Settlements ==
Kibbutzim

- Ga'ash
- Glil Yam (Tel Aviv District)
- Shefayim
- Tel Yitzhak
- Yakum

Moshavim

- Batzra
- Beit Yehoshua
- Bnei Zion
- Kfar Netter
- Rishpon
- Udim

Other villages

- Arsuf (near the ruins of Apollonia)
- Harutzim (community settlement)
- Kiryat Shlomo (hospital)
- Neve Hadassah (youth village)

== Voting Patterns ==
In the 2022 election, 86 percent of voters in the regional council voted for the parties of the center-left coalition led by Yair Lapid, while 13 percent voted for the parties of the right-wing coalition led by Benjamin Netanyahu and 0.4 percent voted for the Arab parties.

In the 2026 election, 86 percent of voters in the regional council voted for the parties of the center-left coalition led by Gadi Eisenkot, while 10 percent voted for the parties of the right-wing coalition led by Benjamin Netanyahu and 0.5 percent voted for the Arab parties. An additional 2.1 percent voted for the Reservists, and 0.9 percent voted for Amcha Yisrael. Voter turnout increased 19 percent from the 2022 election.
