= Poleg =

Stream in Israel

Nahal Poleg Nature Reserve
- שמורת נחל פולג
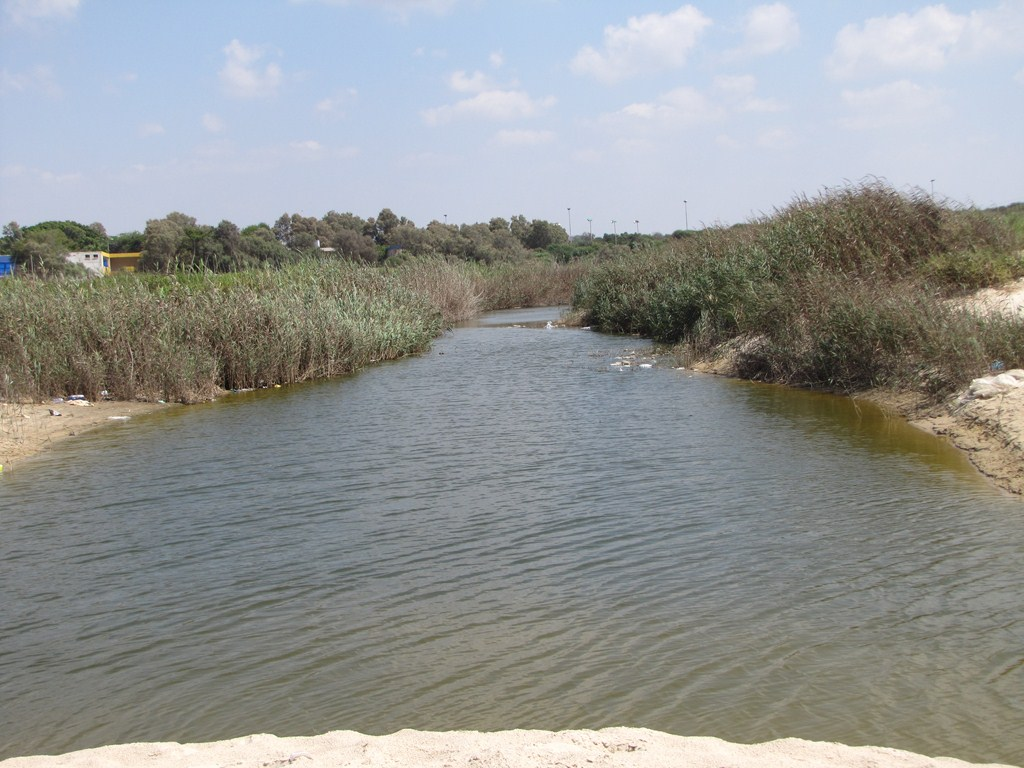
- Poleg Stream

- Location within Israel
- Location: Sharon plain, Israel
- Nearest city: Netanya
- Coordinates: 32°16′5.23″N 34°50′8.58″E
- Area: 500 dunams (0.50 km^{2}; 0.19 sq mi)
- Established: 1971
- Governing body: Israel Nature and Parks Authority

The Poleg (Hebrew: נחל פולג, romanized: Naḥal Poleg) is a stream in the Sharon plain in Israel that empties into the Mediterranean Sea between Netanya and the Wingate Institute.

== Geography ==
The stream starts between Tira and Ramat HaKovesh, east of Mishmeret. It runs west to the sea, veering north at Batzra. It is mostly intermittent, and becomes a perennial stream towards its end. There is a man-made opening in the kurkar ridge that runs south-north along the coastal plain.

== History ==
In Arabic, the stream had been known as نهر الفالق Nahr al-Faliq, alternatively transliterated as Nahr Falaik; and later as وادي الفالق Wadi al-Faliq. The site has mostly been destroyed by a modern quarry. The original opening in the kurkar ridge was made in the Bronze Age, and reopened during the Roman period.

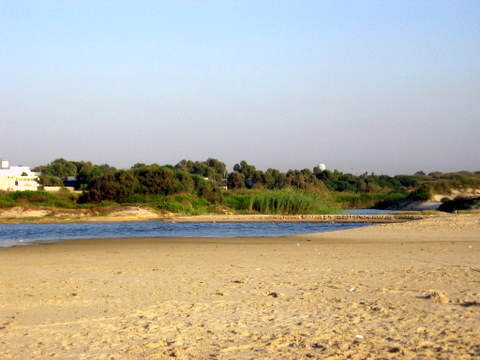
Poleg Delta

The nearby Tel Poleg archaeological site was excavated, revealing a fortified city of the Middle Bronze Age. Aphek-Antipatris, Tel Poleg, Tel Zeror and Tel Burga were the main four fortified sites of the Middle Bronze Age IIA in the Sharon plain.

The Crusaders called the stream River Rochetaillé ("Split-rock River") because of the long narrow rock channel, cut artificially at some former period through the inland cliffs, by which the river finds a channel to the sea shore. On 6 September 1191, the night before the Battle of Arsuf, the Crusaders camped near the mouth of River Rochetaillé; by then, the opening in the ridge had clogged again, resulting in a 4000-dunam marsh, which protected the Crusaders' camp from the east.

The opening was cleared again in 1935, and the stream's current course was set in the area east of the kurkar ridge. The marsh, known by the Arabs as Birkat Ramadan, remained south of Tel Yitzhak as late as 1945, and was a popular hunting location with abundant wildfowl.

== Nature Reserve ==
The Nahal Poleg nature reserve is situated between Wingate Institute and Ramat Poleg, between Highway 2 and the Mediterranean. It covers 500 dunams, and was declared a reserve in 1971.

Flora in the reserve includes a coastal variety of Boxthorn, Ephedra aphylla, Calicotome villosa, the endemic Rumex rothschildianus, Iris atropurpurea, Lupin, and Tulipa agenensis sharonensis.

== See also ==
- National parks and nature reserves of Israel
- Geography of Israel
