= Noam Lanir =

Israeli entrepreneur and controlling shareholder and CEO of Livermore Investment Group

Noam Lanir נעם לניר
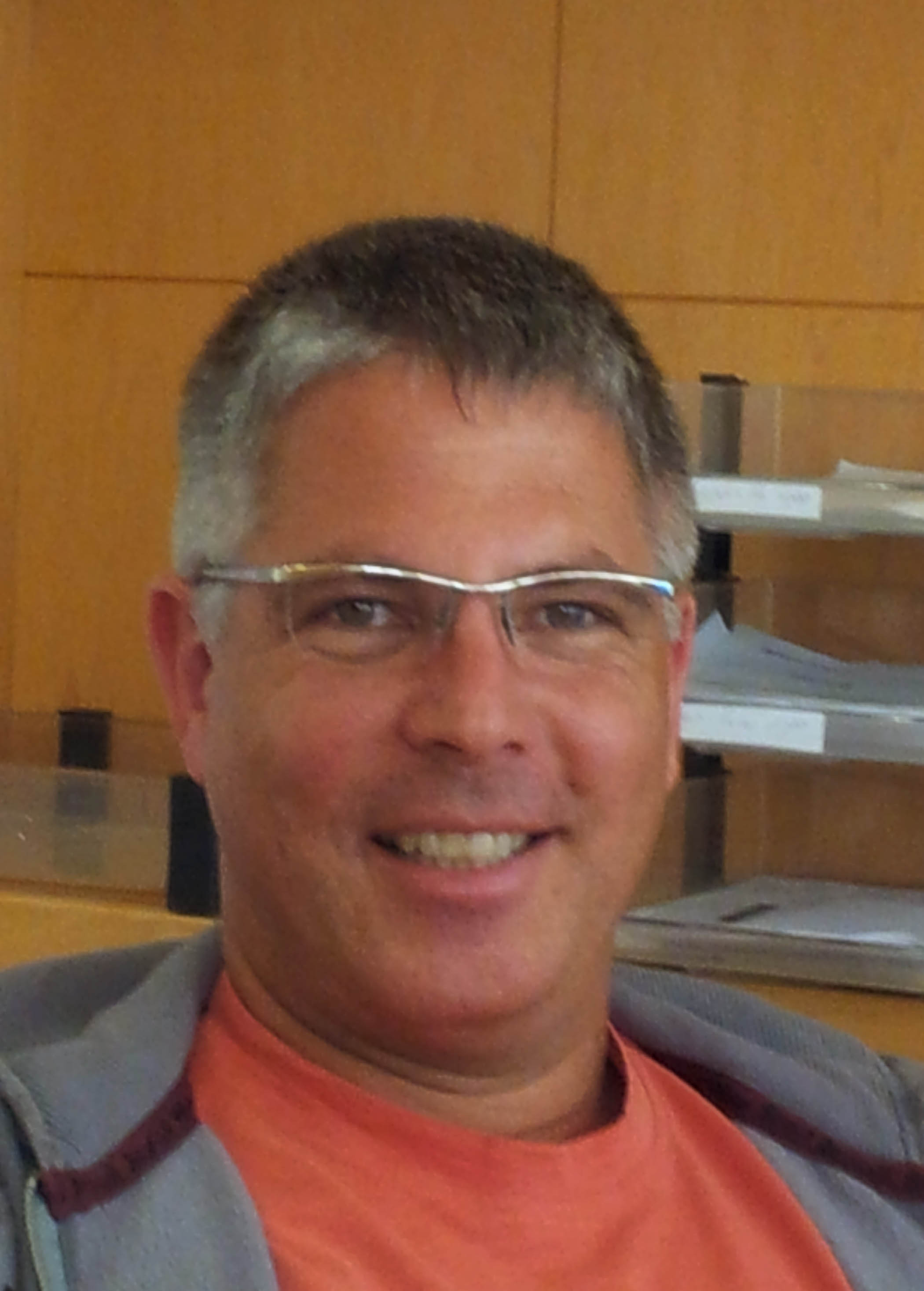
- Born: February 18, 1967 (age 59); Haifa, Israel
- Occupations: CEO, Livermore Investment Group
- Spouse: Tali Lanir
- Website: livermore-inv.com

Noam Lanir (Hebrew: נעם לניר; born February 18, 1967) is an Israeli entrepreneur and the controlling shareholder and CEO of Livermore Investment Group, formerly known as Empire Online.

== Biography ==
Noam Lanir spent most of his early years at Hatzor Airbase, where his father, Lt. Col. Avraham Lanir, served as a fighter pilot. During the Yom Kippur War, his father's plane was shot down over Syria, and his father was taken prisoner and tortured to death in captivity. After his father's death, the family moved to Ramat HaSharon, where Lanir resided until he completed his military service. He attended Rotberg High School in Ramat HaSharon, graduating in 1985. Lanir enlisted in the IDF pilot training course, but dropped out after a year and completed his military service at the unmanned aerial vehicle (UAV) unit of the IDF Intelligence Corps.

He currently resides in Bnei Zion, an upscale moshav. He is married and has four children.

== Business ventures ==
Naom Lanir has led the growth and development of Livermore Investment Group's operations resulting in its IPO in June 2005 on the London Stock Exchange's AIM market, traded under the symbol LIV.

Lanir is the leading shareholder of Babylon Ltd, which is traded on the Tel Aviv Stock Exchange with a current valuation of NIS one billion.

Lanir is the founder of Life Tree Marketing, a company that markets the medical services of Israeli hospitals overseas. The company has offices in the Ramat HaHayal neighborhood of Tel Aviv.

== Philanthropy ==
Lanir's philanthropic activity includes working with Sh'erit ha-Pletah and the Foundation for the Welfare of Holocaust Survivors in Israel.
