= Rishpon =

Moshav in central Israel

Rishpon: רִשְׁפּוֹן (Hebrew)
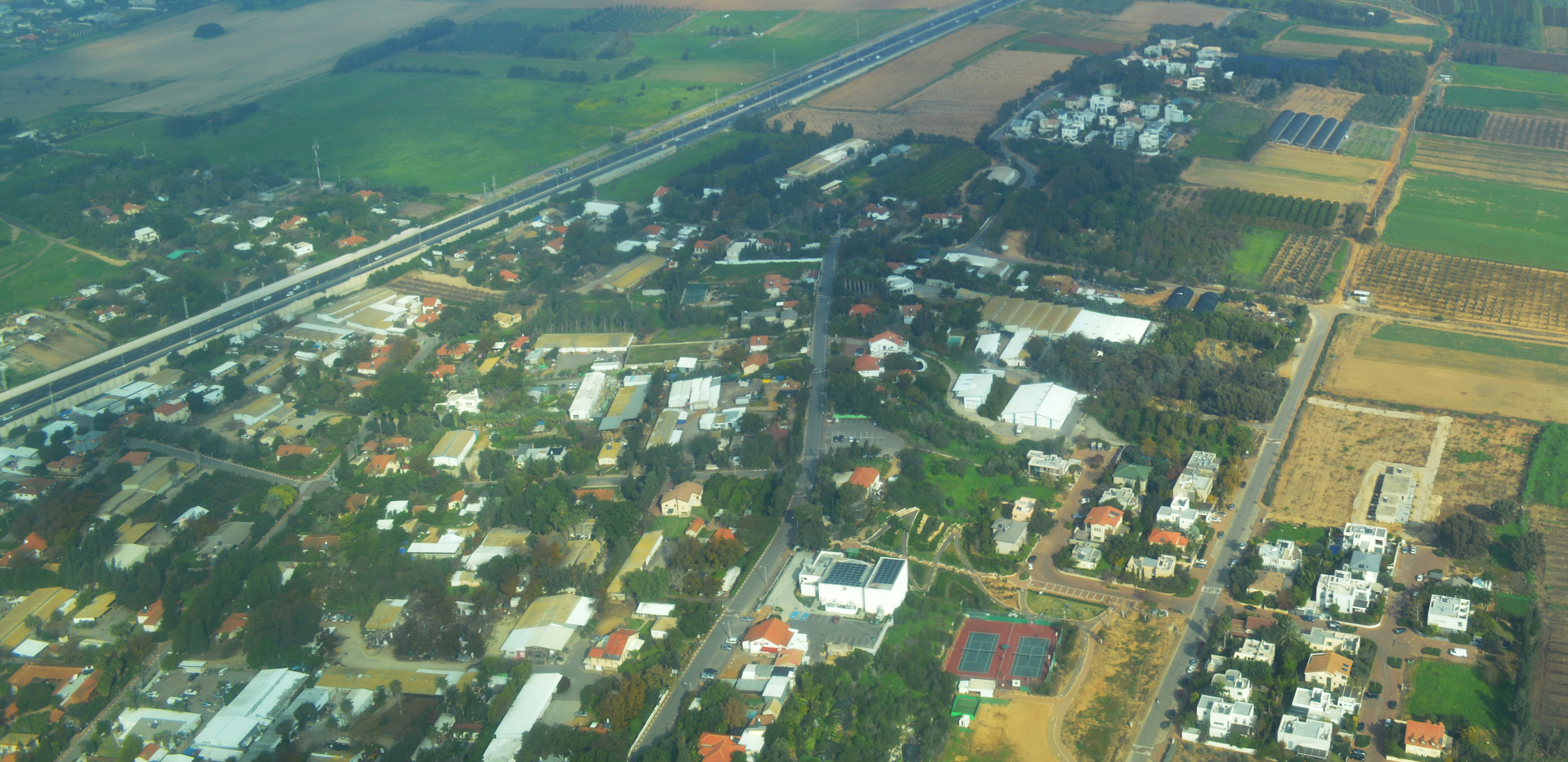

- Location within Central Israel
- Coordinates: 32°12′7″N 34°49′24″E
- Country: Israel
- District: Central
- Subdistrict: HaSharon
- Council: Hof HaSharon
- Affiliation: Moshavim Movement
- Founded: 1936
- Population (2024): 1,319
- Website: www.rishpon.org.il

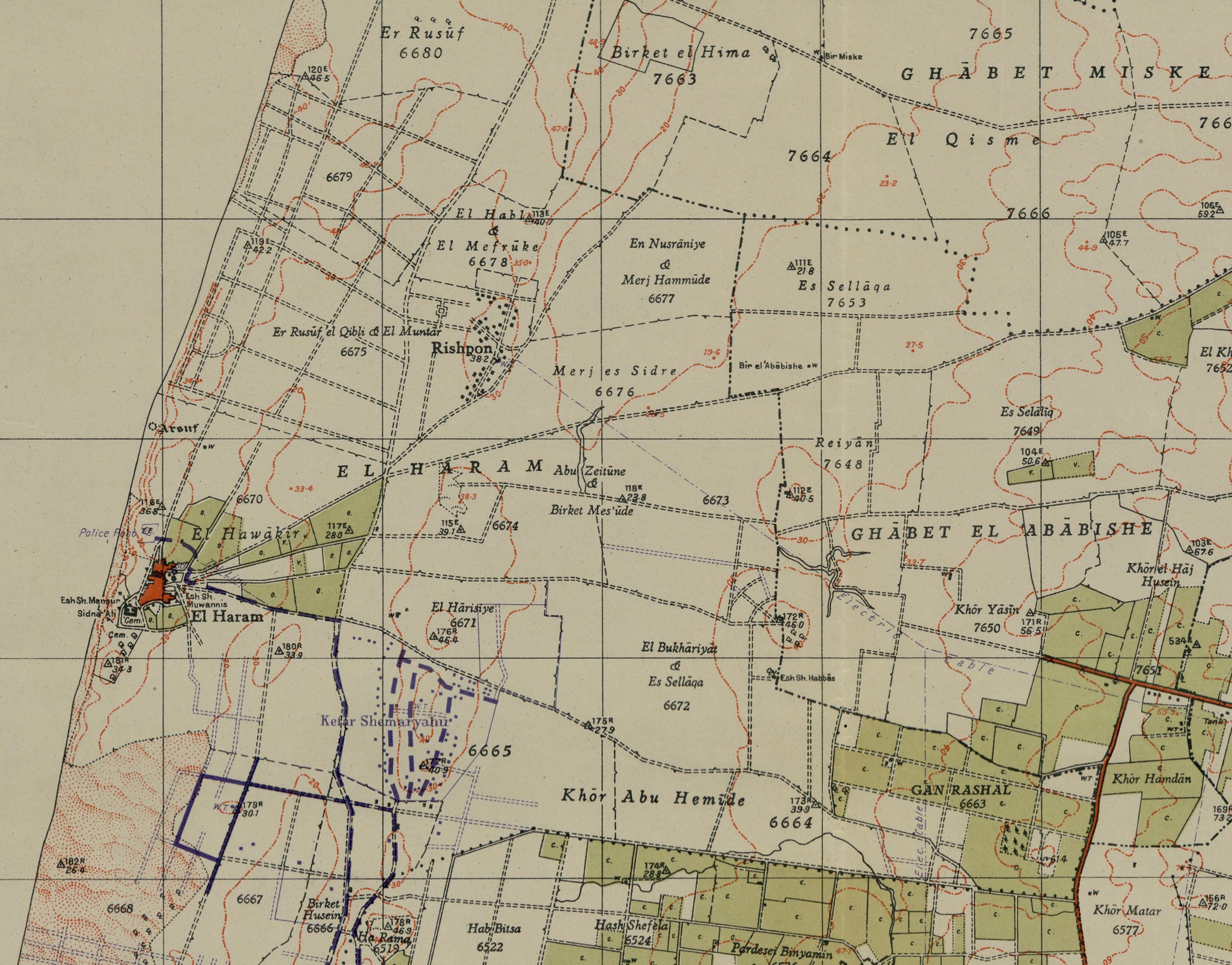
Rishpon 1942 1:20,000

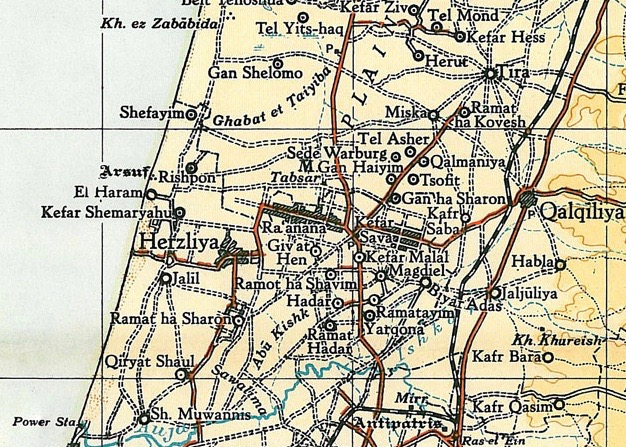
Herzliya 1945 1:250,000

Rishpon (Hebrew: רִשְׁפּוֹן) is a moshav in the Central District of Israel in the Sharon plain near Herzliya. It falls under the jurisdiction of Hof HaSharon Regional Council. In 2024 it had a population of 1,319.

The moshav was established in 1936. Its original proposed name by the name committee, Rishpona (Hebrew: רשפונה), is a reconstruction of the supposed ancient name of Arsuf, based on a misreading of an Assyrian inscription. The current name was chosen by its residents, and has similar elements.

Healing Space is a trauma treatment compound established in Rishpon after the October 7 massacre to treat survivors of the attack on the Nova Music Festival.

== Notable people ==
- Meir Har-Zion (1934–2014), military commando
