= Livermore Investment Group =

English investment company

- Traded as: LSE: LIV
- Industry: Financial industry Investments and loans
- Founded: 2006; 19 years ago
- Founder: Noam Lanir
- Website: Official website

Livermore Investment Group is a listed company on the London Stock Exchange under the symbol LIV. Founded in 2006 as an investment Company, it became an in the US Collateralized Loan Obligation market.

== Corporate information ==
The company's board of directors includes:

- Noam Lanir, Founder and Chief Executive Officer
- Ron Baron, Founder, Executive Director And Chief Investment Officer
- Richard Barry Rosenberg, Non-Executive Director
- Augoustinos Papathomas, Non-Executive Director
