= Kiryat Shlomo =

Hospital in central Israel

Kiryat Shlomo: קריית שלמה (Hebrew)
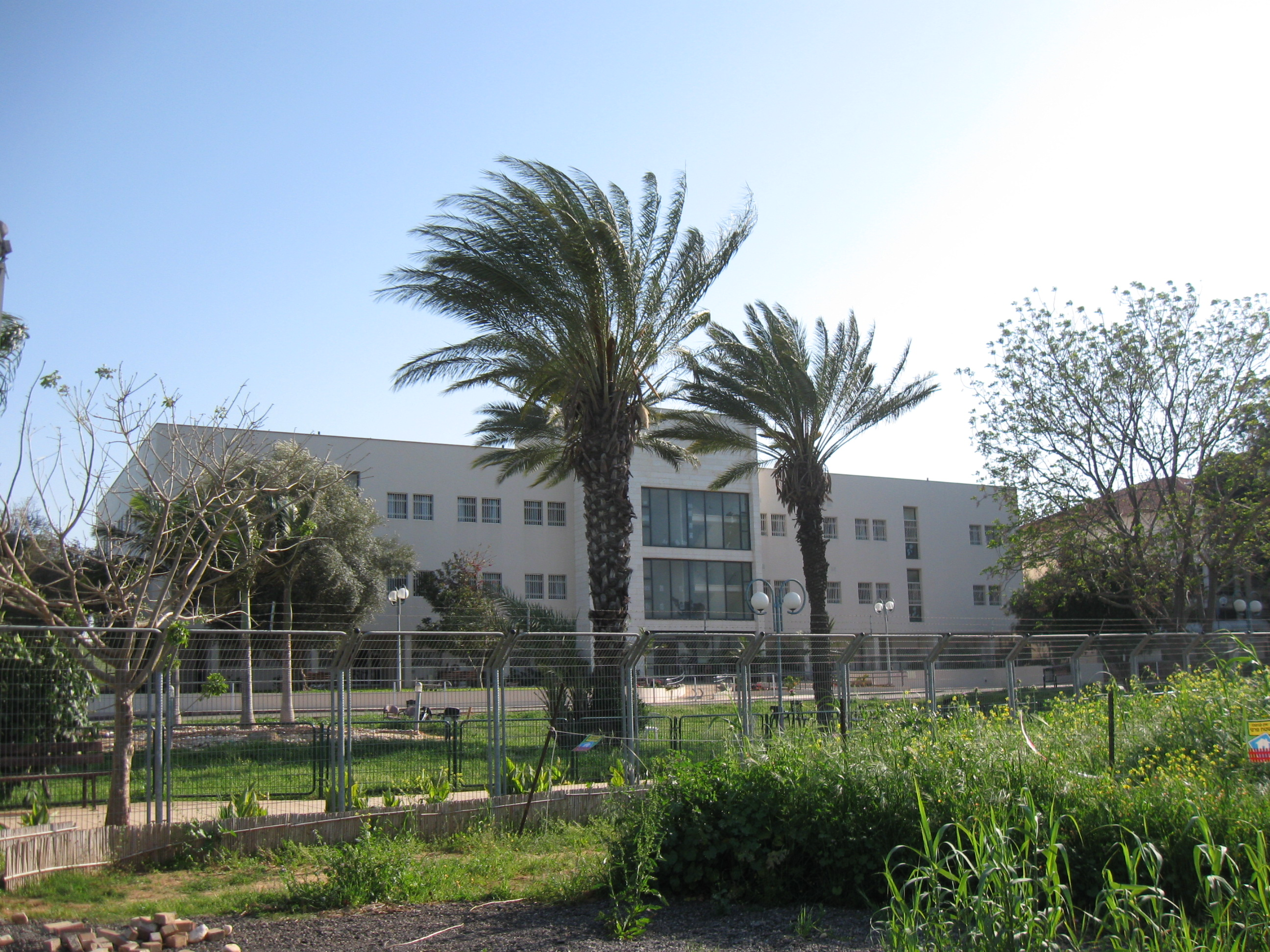

- Location within Central Israel
- Coordinates: 32°14′03″N 34°51′41″E
- Country: Israel
- District: Central
- Subdistrict: HaSharon
- Council: Hof HaSharon
- Founded: 1945
- Population (2024): 419
- Website: kiryat-shlomo.co.il

Kiryat Shlomo (Hebrew: קריית שלמה, lit. 'Place of Shlomo') is a psychiatric and geriatric hospital in Israel, that has the status of an institutional settlement. It falls within the jurisdiction of Hof HaSharon Regional Council and had a population of 419 in 2024.

== History ==
The community was established in 1945.
