= Batzra =

Moshav in central Israel

Batzra: בָּצְרָה (Hebrew)
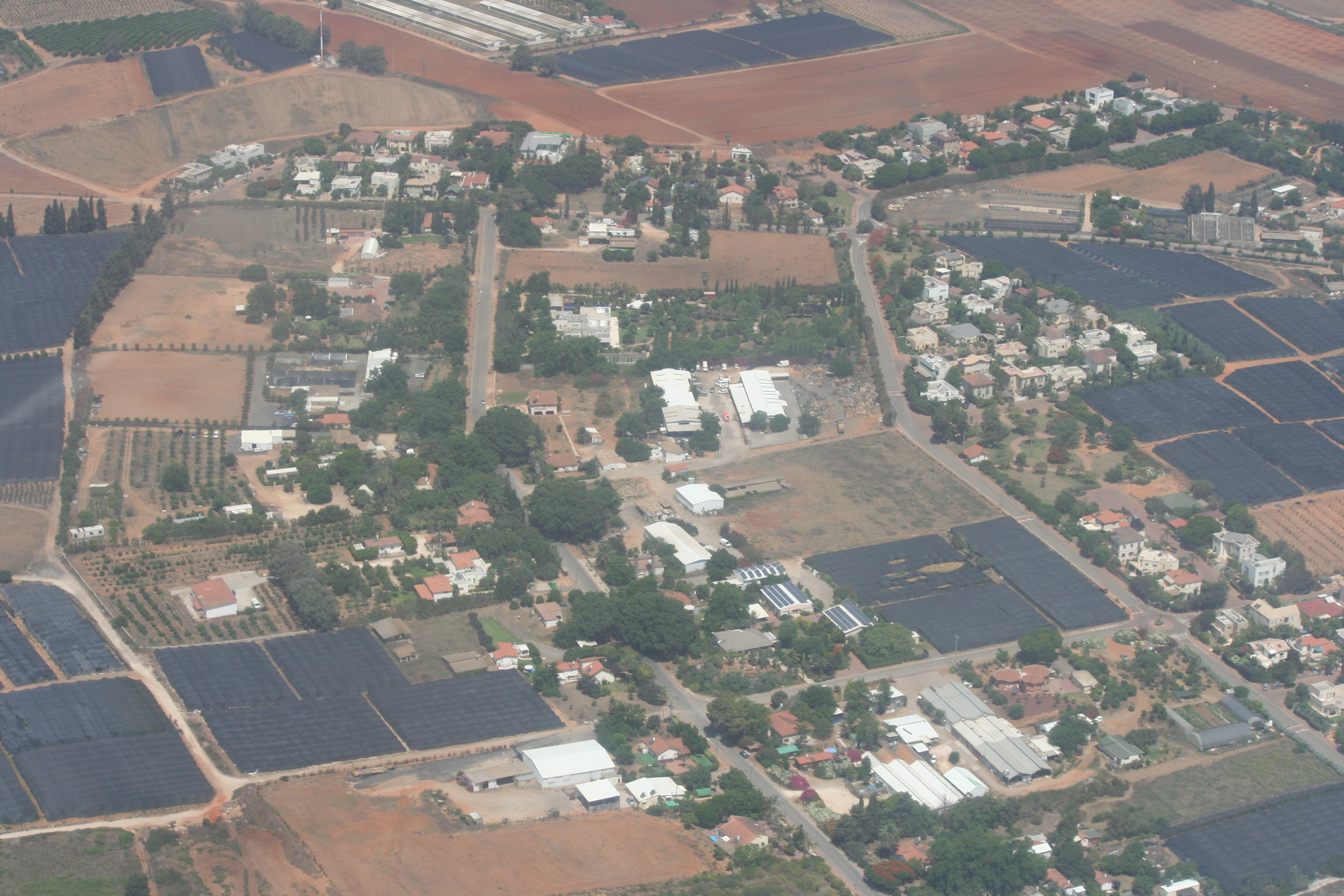

- Location within Central Israel Location within Israel
- Coordinates: 32°12′46″N 34°52′40″E
- Country: Israel
- District: Central
- Subdistrict: HaSharon
- Council: Hof HaSharon
- Affiliation: Agricultural Union
- Founded: 1946
- Founder: Demobilised soldiers
- Population (2024): 965

Batzra (Hebrew: בָּצְרָה) is a moshav in central Israel. Located in the Sharon plain near Ra'anana, it falls under the jurisdiction of Hof HaSharon Regional Council. In 2024 it had a population of 965.

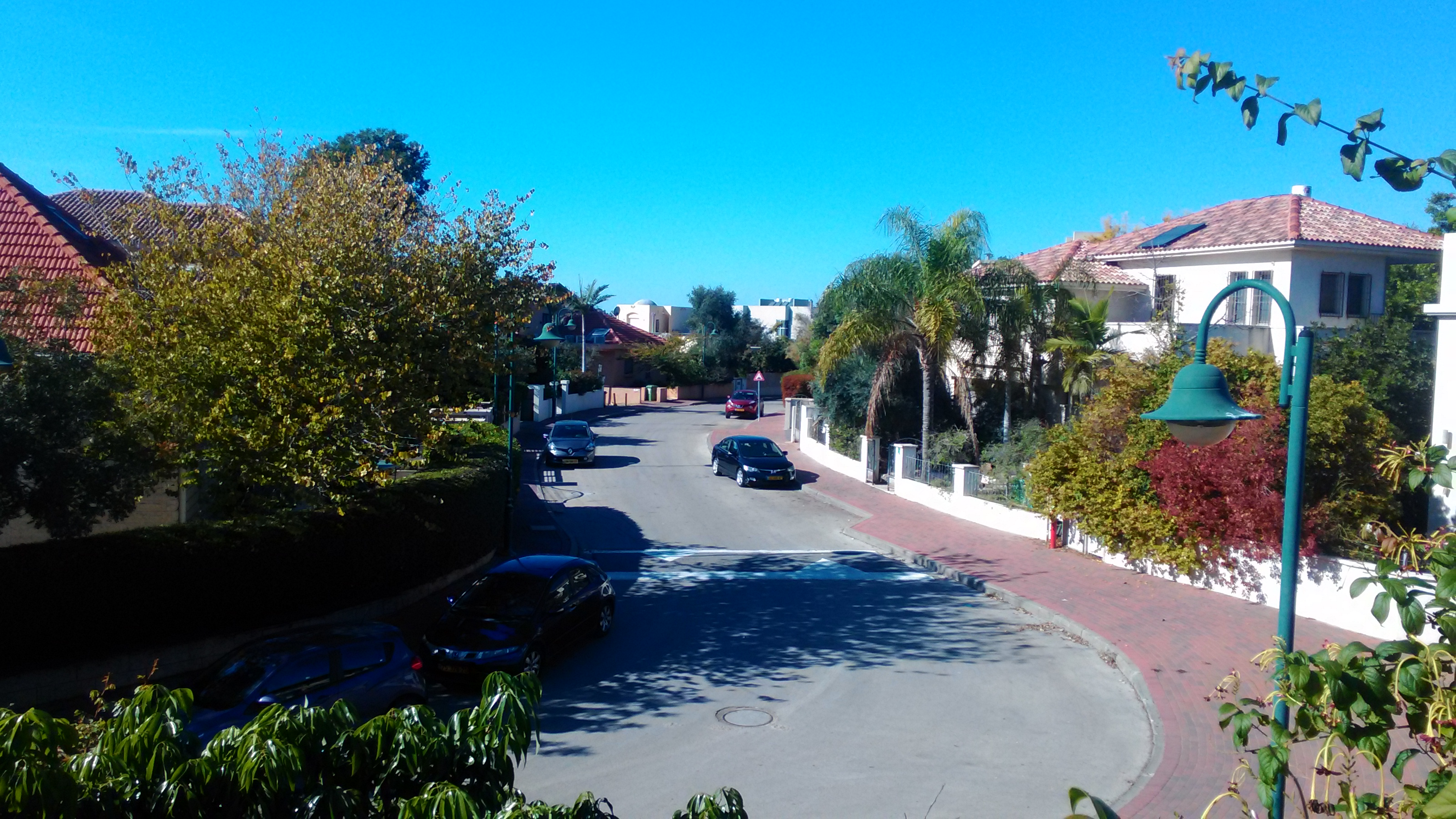
Street in Moshav Batzra

== History ==
The region of Batzra lies in the southern Sharon plain, which before the 20th century formed part of the Forest of Sharon. This was an open woodland dominated by Mount Tabor oak that stretched from Kfar Yona in the north to Ra'anana in the south. Local Arab inhabitants traditionally used the area for pasture, firewood, and intermittent cultivation. During the 19th century, the intensification of settlement and agriculture led to large-scale deforestation and environmental degradation.

Batzra was established in 1946 by demobilised soldiers who had served in the British Army during World War II. Many of them had received technical training while stationed in the Middle East. The settlement was named after Basra, Iraq, where their unit had been posted.

By 1947, Batzra had about 80 residents, living in simple wooden huts and tents while they developed orchards and field crops. In the following years, the moshav was strengthened by new arrivals from the Jewish community of South Africa, who contributed to its population growth and agricultural development.

Like other moshavim in the Sharon, Batzra initially relied on citrus orchards, poultry, and dairy farming. Over time, many residents began working in nearby urban centers such as Ra'anana, Herzliya, and Tel Aviv, while still maintaining small-scale agriculture. Today, Batzra has partly suburbanized, though it retains its rural character.
