= Khirbat al-Zababida =

Khirbat al-Zababida خربة الزبابدة
- Etymology: The ruin of Zebabdeh (a family name)
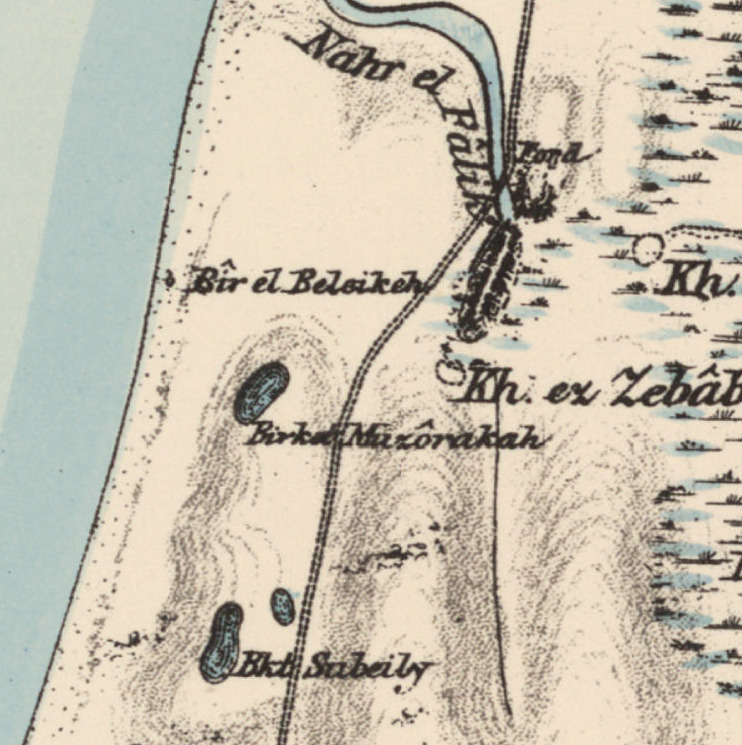
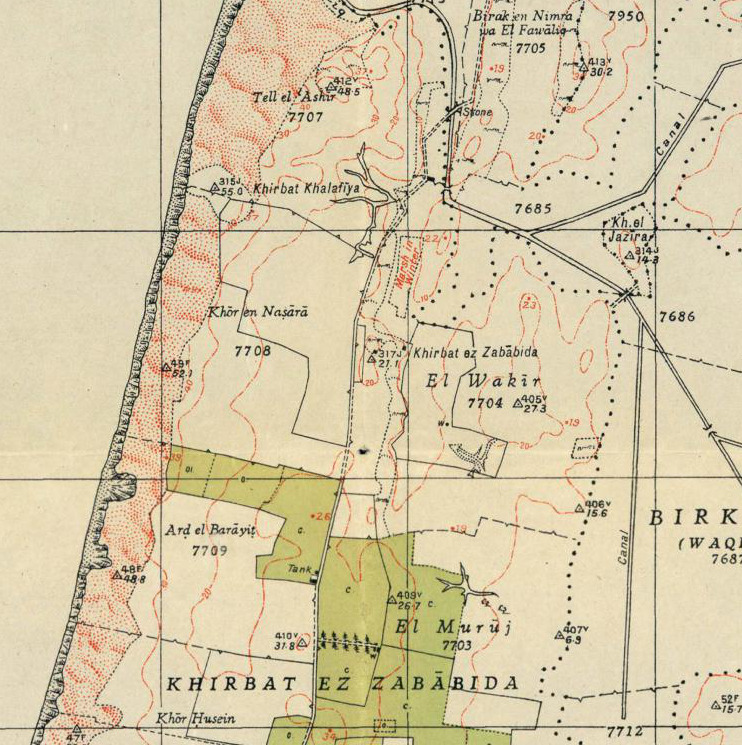
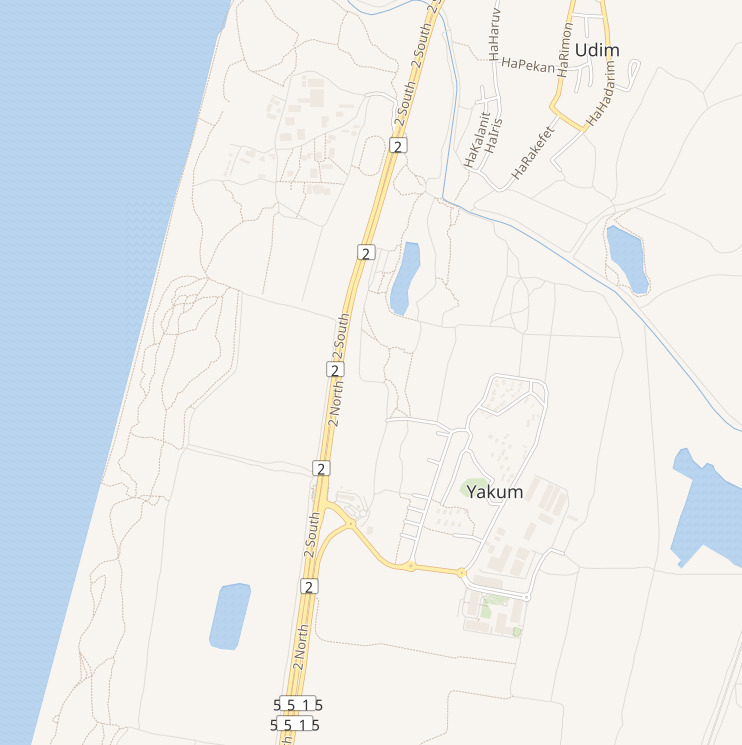
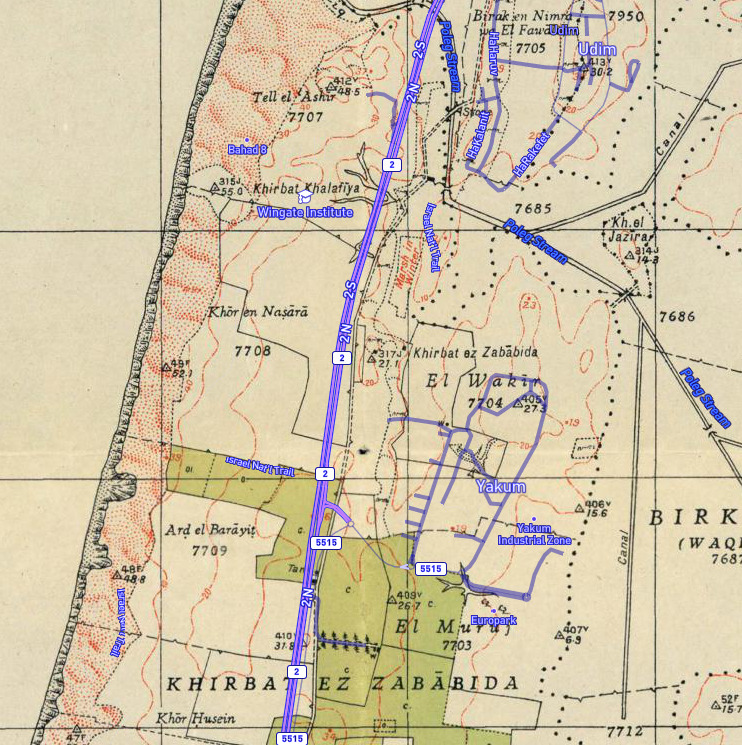
- 1870s map 1940s map modern map 1940s with modern overlay map A series of historical maps of the area around Khirbat al-Zababida (click the buttons)

- Location within Mandatory Palestine
- Coordinates: 32°15′11″N 34°50′14″E
- Palestine grid: 134/184
- Geopolitical entity: Mandatory Palestine
- Subdistrict: Tulkarm
- Date of depopulation: May 15, 1948

Area
  - Total: 10,879 dunams (10.879 km^{2}; 4.200 sq mi)
- Current Localities: Yakum Ga'ash

Khirbat al-Zababida (Arabic: خربة الزبابدة, the Ruin of the People of Kafr Zibad) was a Palestinian Arab village in the Tulkarm Subdistrict. It was depopulated during the 1948 Arab–Israeli War on May 15, 1948. It was located 20 kilometres (12 mi) southwest of Tulkarm, south of Wadi al-Faliq. Khirbat al-Zababida was mostly destroyed except for four deserted houses.

== History ==
In the 1860s, the Ottoman authorities granted the village of Kafr Zibad an agricultural plot of land called Ghabat Kafr Zibad in the former confines of the Forest of Arsur (Ar. Al-Ghaba) in the coastal plain, west of the village. This formed the foundation for Khirbat Zababida, In 1870, Victor Guérin noted it as an old, rather ruined hamlet, named Kharbet el-Belakieh. It was located on a small hill, and had a path leading to a harbour, where water melons were being shipped out.

In 1882, the PEF's Survey of Western Palestine (SWP) found at Kh. ez Zebabdeh "a small modern ruined village".

=== British Mandate era ===
By 1944/45 the village jurisdiction was 10,879 dunams, of which 4,626 (43 percent) was Arab owned, 4,884 (45 percent) was Jewish owned, and 1,369 (12 percent) was publicly owned. Of this, Arabs used 344 dunums of land used for citrus and bananas, 3,839 dunums to cereals, 215 dunums were irrigated or used for orchards, while a total of 1,750 dunams were classified as uncultivable areas. The Jewish kibbutz of Yakum was established in 1947 on village land.

=== 1948, aftermath ===
Ga'ash was established in 1951, also on village land.

In 1992 the village site was described: "The site is deserted and overgrown with wild vegetation and trees. All but four of the houses have been destroyed. These four houses still have intact roofs. Three of them were made of cement bricks, and one of hard igneous stone. Iron girders from five destroyed houses protrude from piles of stones.[..] A picnic site has been built for Kibbutz Yaqum on the edge of a natural pond."

== Bibliography ==
- Conder, C.R.; Kitchener, H.H. (1882). The Survey of Western Palestine: Memoirs of the Topography, Orography, Hydrography, and Archaeology. Vol. 2. London: Committee of the Palestine Exploration Fund.
- Department of Statistics (1945). Village Statistics, April, 1945. Government of Palestine.
- Guérin, V. (1875). Description Géographique Historique et Archéologique de la Palestine (in French). Vol. 2: Samarie, pt. 2. Paris: L'Imprimerie Nationale.
- Hadawi, S. (1970). Village Statistics of 1945: A Classification of Land and Area ownership in Palestine. Palestine Liberation Organization Research Center. Archived from the original on 2018-12-08.
- Khalidi, W. (1992). All That Remains: The Palestinian Villages Occupied and Depopulated by Israel in 1948. Washington D.C.: Institute for Palestine Studies. ISBN 0-88728-224-5.
- Palmer, E.H. (1881). The Survey of Western Palestine: Arabic and English Name Lists Collected During the Survey by Lieutenants Conder and Kitchener, R. E. Transliterated and Explained by E.H. Palmer. Committee of the Palestine Exploration Fund.
