= Bnei Zion =

Moshav in central Israel

Bnei Zion: בְּנֵי צִיּוֹן (Hebrew)
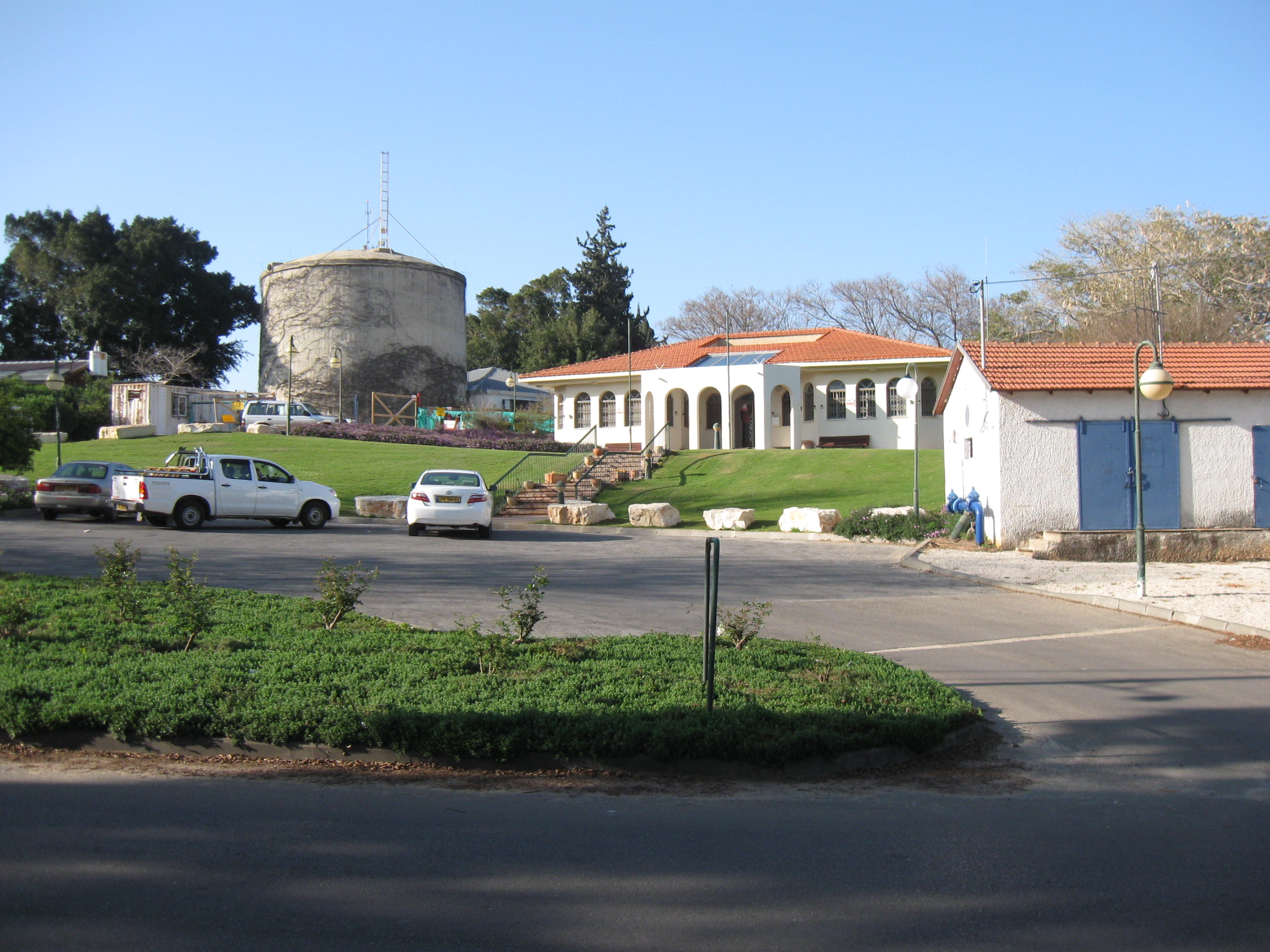

- Location within Central Israel Location within Israel
- Coordinates: 32°13′5″N 34°52′6″E
- Country: Israel
- District: Central
- Subdistrict: HaSharon
- Council: Hof HaSharon
- Affiliation: Agricultural Union
- Founded: 27 March 1947
- Founder: Jewish Agency
- Population (2024): 1,150
- Website: www.bnaizion.org.il

Bnei Zion (Hebrew: בְּנֵי צִיּוֹן, lit. 'Sons of Zion') is a moshav in central Israel. Located in the Sharon plain around four and a half kilometres north of Ra'anana, it falls under the jurisdiction of Hof HaSharon Regional Council. In 2024 it had a population of 1,150.

== History ==
Before the 20th century the area formed part of the Forest of Sharon. It was an open woodland dominated by Mount Tabor Oak, which extended from Kfar Yona in the north to Ra'anana in the south. The local Arab inhabitants traditionally used the area for pasture, firewood and intermittent cultivation. The intensification of settlement and agriculture in the coastal plain during the 19th century led to deforestation and subsequent environmental degradation.

Bnei Zion was established on 27 March 1947 by the Jewish Agency for Israel, and was initially called Gva'ot Ra'anana (גבעות רעננה, lit. 'Ra'anana Hills') before being renamed after Bnai Zion Foundation, the American organisation that helped found it.

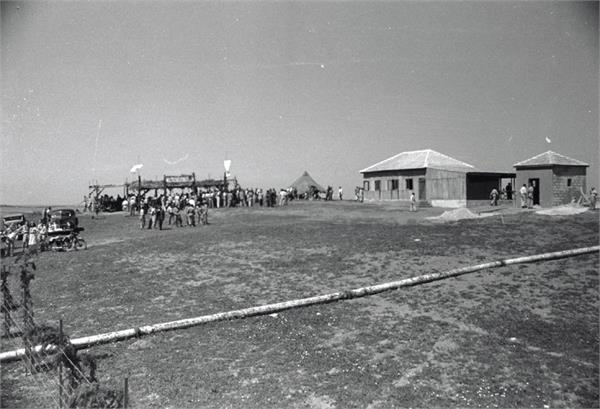
Bnei Zion 27 March 1947

== Nature reserve ==
Just west of the moshav is a 100-dunam nature reserve, declared in 1968. The reserve is a remnant of the natural state of the Sharon plain, rich in flora that grows well in iron-rich soil.

== Notable people ==
- Shari Arison
- Noam Lanir
