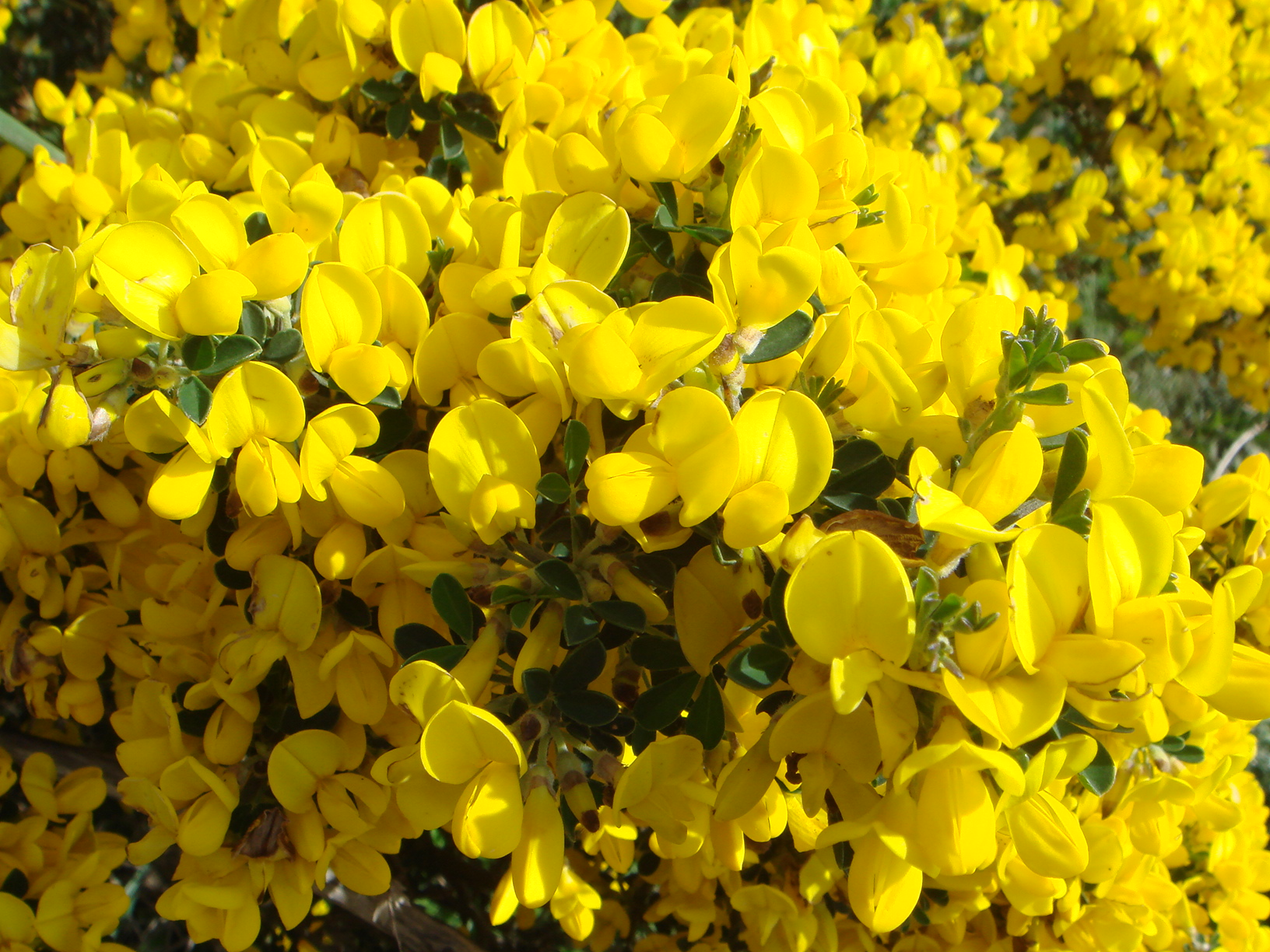
- Calicotome villosa

Scientific classification
- Kingdom: Plantae
- Clade: Tracheophytes
- Clade: Angiosperms
- Clade: Eudicots
- Clade: Rosids
- Order: Fabales
- Family: Fabaceae
- Subfamily: Faboideae
- Tribe: Genisteae
- Genus: Calicotome; Link (1808)

Species
- 5; see text

Synonyms
- Calycotome Link (1808); Lygoplis Raf. (1838)

= Calicotome =

Genus of legumes

Calicotome is a genus of flowering plants in the family Fabaceae. It includes five species native to the Mediterranean Basin. The genus belongs to the subfamily Faboideae. It may be synonymous with Cytisus. All species of the genus are thorny shrubs. In the Myth of Er, tyrants are punished by being dragged through thorny Calicotomes (ἀσπάλαθος).

== Species ==
Calicotome comprises the following species:

Image	Scientific name	Distribution
	Calicotome infesta (C. Presl) Guss.	Europe
	Calicotome intermedia (Salzm. ex C.Presl) Boiss. ex Rchb.f.	North Africa (Morocco to Libya) and southern and southeastern Spain
	Calicotome rigida (Viv.) Maire & Weiller	North Africa
	Calicotome spinosa (L.) Link	Spain, France, Italy, Croatia and Algeria
	Calicotome villosa (Poir.) Link	eastern Mediterranean region, Europe
