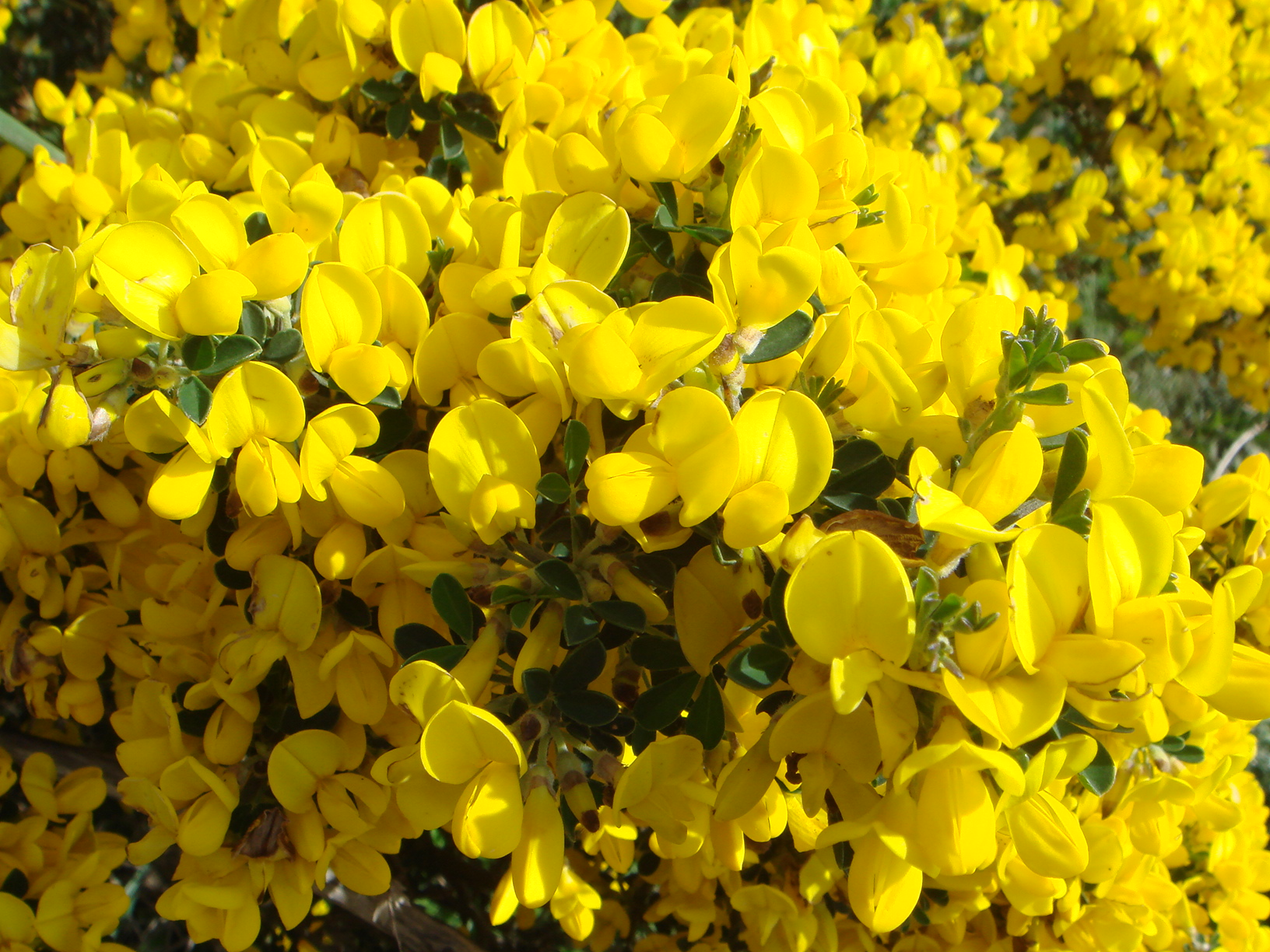

Scientific classification
- Kingdom: Plantae
- Clade: Embryophytes
- Clade: Tracheophytes
- Clade: Spermatophytes
- Clade: Angiosperms
- Clade: Eudicots
- Clade: Rosids
- Order: Fabales
- Family: Fabaceae
- Subfamily: Faboideae
- Genus: Calicotome
- Species: C. villosa

Binomial name
- Calicotome villosa (Poir.) Link

= Calicotome villosa =

Species of legume

Calicotome villosa, also known as hairy thorny broom and spiny broom, is a small shrubby tree native to the Mediterranean region.

== Etymology ==
Calicotome is derived from the Greek kalux, calyx and tomos, cut; this refers to the fact that, after flowering, the calyx breaks off in circle and looks as if cut. Villosa is derived from the Latin villus, hair, because the pods are usually hairy.

== Description ==
Shrubby tree, 1–2 m, very spiny. Twigs striate, villous. Leaves digitate, with three leaflets, inserted in clusters on branchlets. Flowers inserted in the middle of the leaves on branchlets. Calyx campanulate, puberulent, with margins almost entire. Corolla 10–12 mm, bright yellow. Standard ample, longer than other parts. Pod densely villous. The tree blossoms in January through April.

== Habitat ==
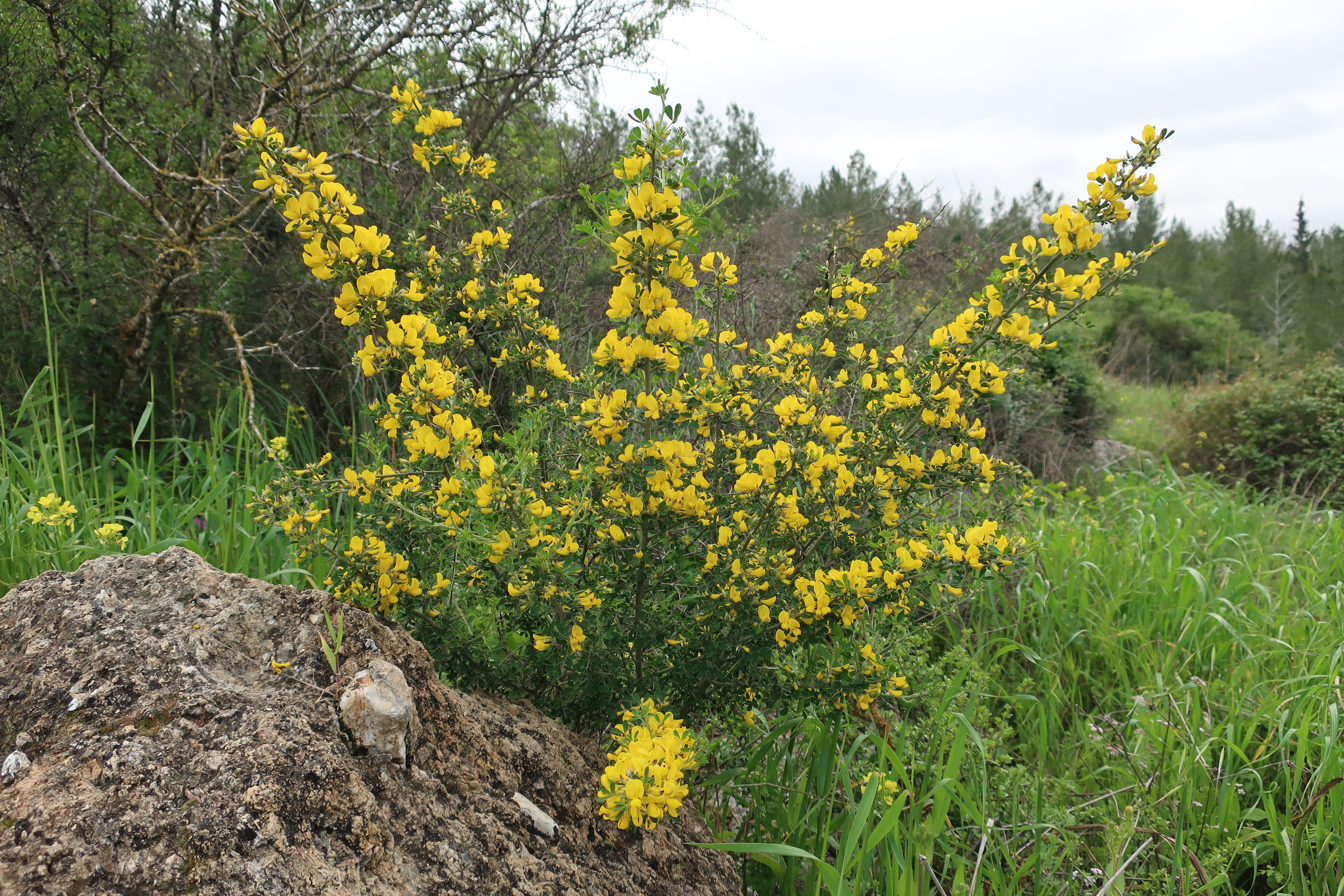
In habitat in the Judean mountains

Rocky hillsides and bushy places. The tree is found in the Mediterranean region from Portugal and Morocco east to the Levant.

== Usage in antiquity ==
The florets were used in ancient times to flavor sesame oil. Al-Tamimi, the physician (10th century), describing the process, writes that in Syria it was commonly practiced to collect the yellow florets of the spiny broom (Arabic: القندول), spread them upon thickly woven sackcloth laid out in the hot sun, pour over them hulled sesame seeds and cover them with linen sheets, while leaving them until the moisture evaporated. In this manner, the sesame seeds would absorb the sweet fragrance of the florets. After one or two days, the florets and sesame seeds were then separated, the sesame placed on clean linen garments, being allowed to further dry-out from the moisture absorbed by the florets. This process was repeated up to 3 or 4 times, with a fresh batch of florets set out to dry, until at length the pungent flavor of the florets (resembling the taste of vanilla) had been fully imparted to the sesame seeds. The dried florets were then collected and pressed with the sesame seeds in order to produce a fragrant oil. The oil was formerly stored in glassware vessels, with just enough space left at the top to be sealed with the florets of the spiny broom. Today, the florets are still used by Arabs of the country to flavor butter.
