= Fardisya =

Fardisya فرديسيا
- Etymology: Paradise
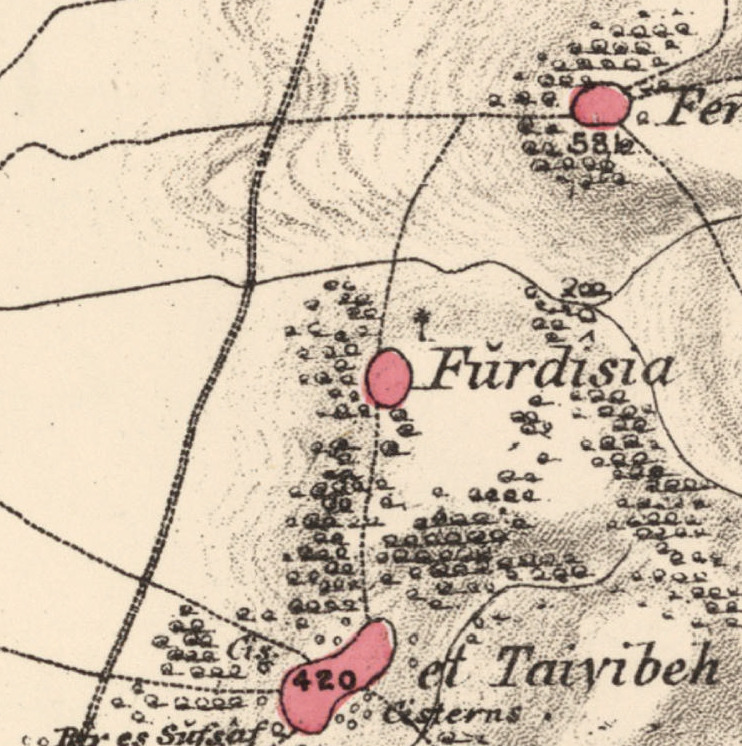
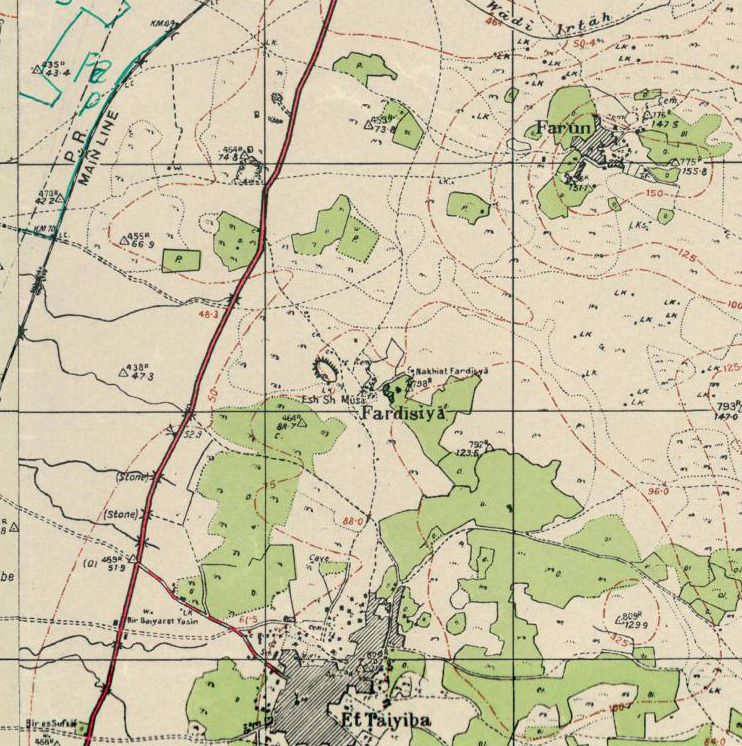
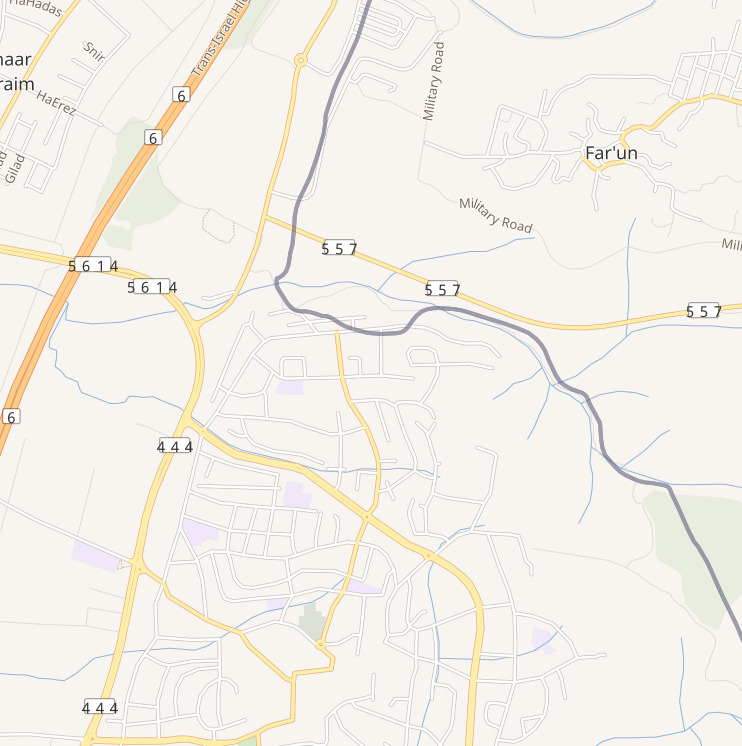
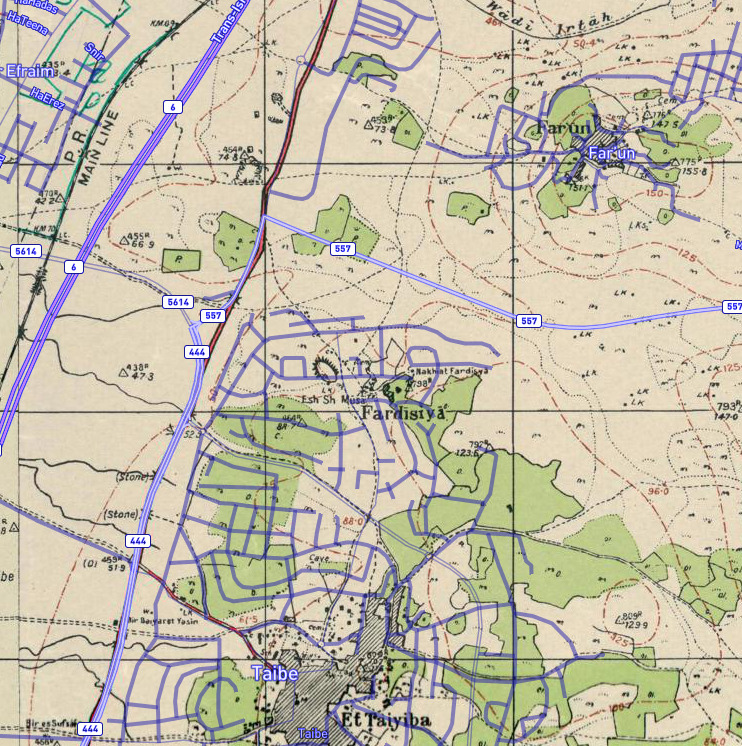
- 1870s map 1940s map modern map 1940s with modern overlay map A series of historical maps of the area around Fardisya (click the buttons)

- Location within Mandatory Palestine
- Coordinates: 32°16′41″N 35°00′47″E
- Palestine grid: 151/187
- Geopolitical entity: Mandatory Palestine
- Subdistrict: Tulkarm
- Date of depopulation: April 1, 1948

Area
  - Total: 1,092 dunams (1.092 km^{2}; 0.422 sq mi)

Population (1945)
  - Total: 20
- Current Localities: Sha'ar Efraim

Fardisya was a Palestinian Arab hamlet in the Tulkarm Subdistrict, 2.5 kilometres (1.6 mi) south of Tulkarm.

It was depopulated during the 1947–48 Civil War in Mandatory Palestine on April 1, 1948, under Operation Coastal Clearing, and was mostly destroyed with the exception of a single deserted house.

The village was home to the Desuqi family, descendants of Ibrahim al-Desuqi, an Egyptian Sufi leader who lived in Desouk, Egypt during the 13th century and founded the Desuqiyya order. His descendants migrated to Palestine in 1780, and two of them settled at Fardisya. The Desuqi family are their descendants.

Today the area where the village stood been subsumed into the Arab-Israeli town of Tayibe. The Desuqi family today lives in Taybeh.

== History ==
Achaelological excavations have recovered ceramics from the Iron Age (c. tenth century BCE), and a sarcophagus from the Roman era.

The Crusaders referred to Fardisya as Phardesi. In 1207–08 the Hospitallers received from Lady Juliana of Caesarea the villages of Pharaon (Far´un) and Seingibis (Khirbat Nisf Jubail); Phardesi marked the southern boundary of these lands.

In 1265, Fardisya was among the villages and estates sultan Baibars allocated to his emirs after he had expelled the Crusaders, with the whole of Fardisya given to his emir Saif al-Din Baidaghan al-Rukni.

Potsherds from the Mamluk era have also been found here.

=== Ottoman era ===
Fardisa was incorporated into the Ottoman Empire in 1517 with all of Palestine, and in 1596 it appeared in the tax registers as being in the Nahiya of Bani Sa'b of the Liwa of Nablus. It had a population of 83, (13 households and 2 bachelors), all Muslim. The villagers paid a fixed tax-rate of 33% various agricultural products, including wheat, barley, summer crops, olive trees, goats and/or beehives in addition to occasional revenues; a total of 5,000 akçe. All the revenues went to a waqf.

In 1838, Furdisia was noted as a village in the Beni Sa'ab area, west of Nablus. In 1870, Victor Guérin noted that the village was situated on a hill.

In the 1860s, the Ottoman authorities granted the village an agricultural plot of land called Ghabat Fardisya in the former confines of the Forest of Arsur (Ar. Al-Ghaba) in the coastal plain, west of the village. The name of Ghabat is Fardisya is preserved in the name of the modern Jewish settlement of Pardesiya.

In 1870/1871 (1288 AH), an Ottoman census listed the village in the nahiya (sub-district) of Bani Sa'b.

In 1881, the PEF's Survey of Western Palestine (SWP) described "a small village near the edge of the hills, remarkable only from a palm growing at it.”

=== British Mandate era ===
In the 1922 census of Palestine there were 15 villagers, all Muslim, increasing in the 1931 census to 55 Muslims, in a total of 14 houses.

In the 1945 statistics, Fardisiya had a population of 20 Muslims with a total of 1,092 dunums of land. Of this, a total of 187 dunams were plantations and irrigated land, 388 dunums were for cereals, while 19 dunams were classified as “built-up” areas.

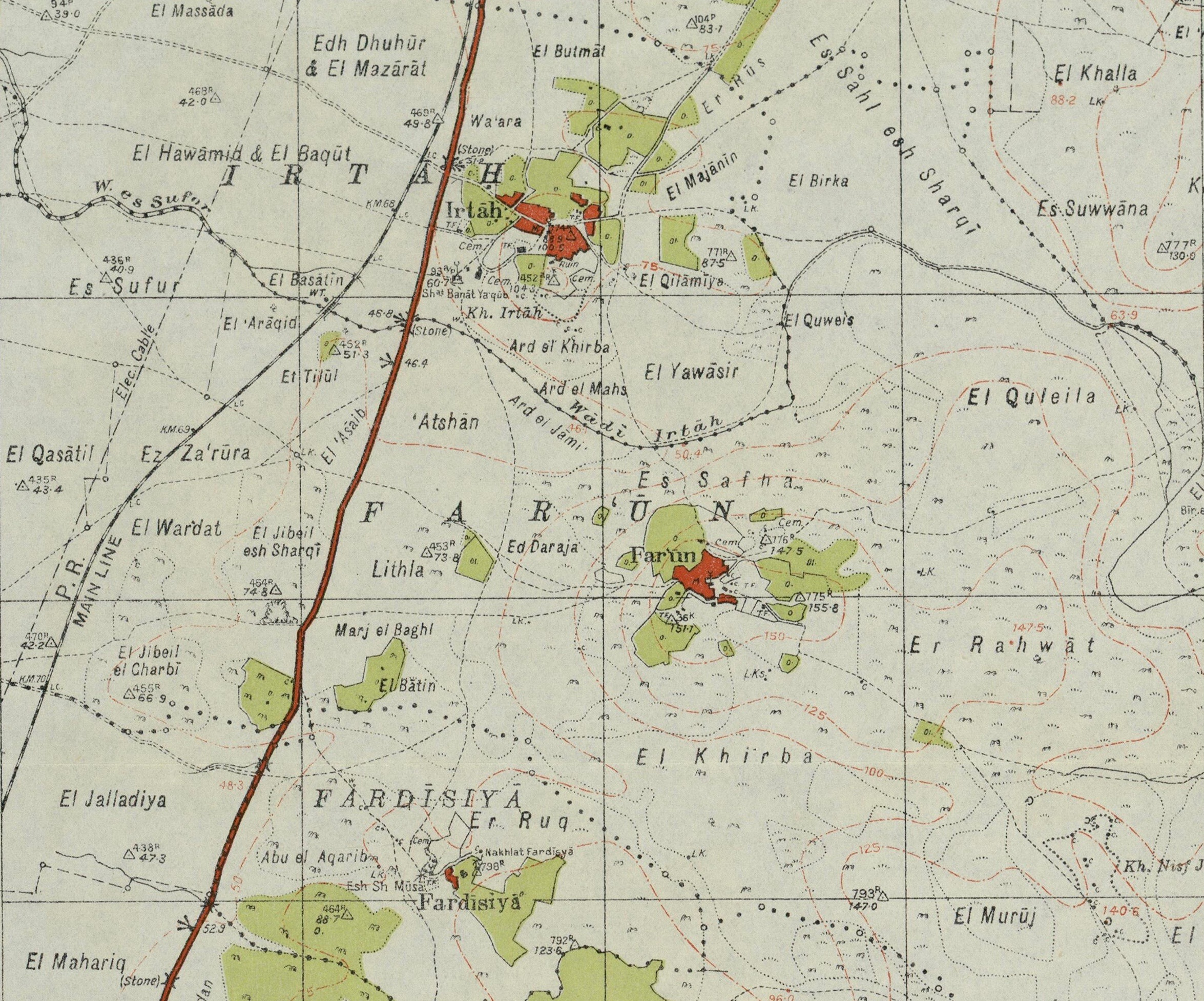
Fardisya 1942 1:20,000

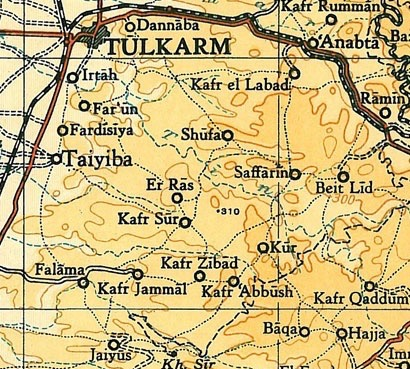
Fardisya 1945 1:250,000

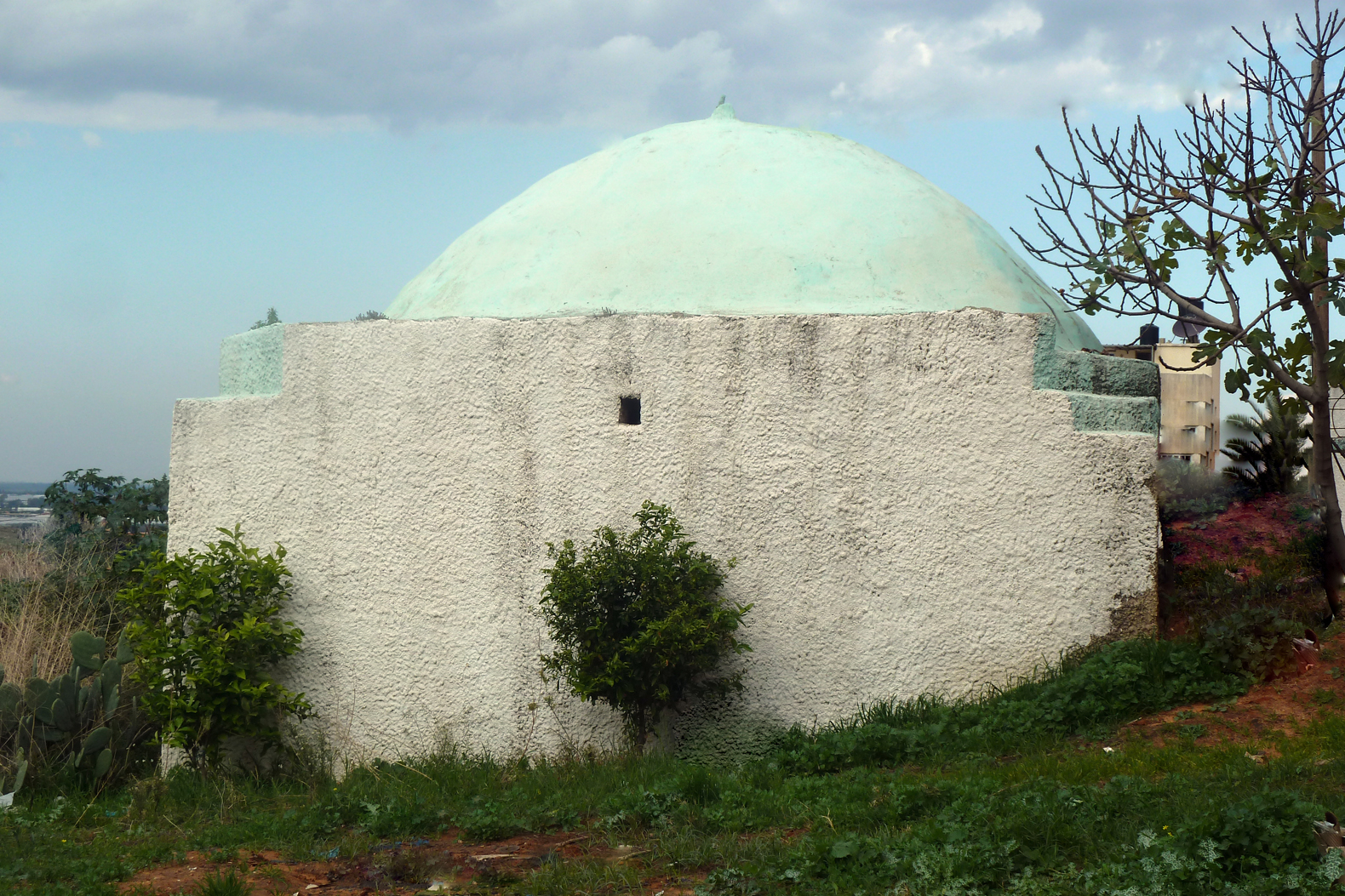
Maqam Esh Sh. Musa, or al-sheikh Masood

=== 1948, aftermath ===
The moshav Sha'ar Efraim is close to some of Fardisya's lands.

== The Desuqi family and shrine ==
The tomb of ash-Sheikh Musa al-Desuqi, the village's sheikh, is located here. He was a descendant of an Egyptian Sufi leader named Ibrahim al-Desuqi (1255-1296), who hailed from Desouk in northern Egypt. Ibrahim al-Desuqi is considered one of the descendants of the Shiite Emir Ja'far al-Sadiq. He founded the Desuqiyya order, one of four main Sufi orders in Egypt, and his tomb remains a site of mass pilgrimage in Egypt. Ibrahim al-Desuqi's descendants arrived in Palestine in 1780, with Musa ad-Dasuqi and his brother Ibrahim settling in Fardisya.

Musa, who is the ancestor of the Dasuqi family still residing in Taybe today, gained a revered status and was buried there. The tomb area became a burial site for members of the Dasuki family. Local belief holds that he safeguards the area, prevents theft, and has the power to heal the sick. According to local tradition, a woman who once slept on a nearby rock became mentally disturbed upon waking up.

== Bibliography ==
- Barron, J. B., ed. (1923). Palestine: Report and General Abstracts of the Census of 1922. Government of Palestine.
- Conder, C.R.; Kitchener, H.H. (1882). The Survey of Western Palestine: Memoirs of the Topography, Orography, Hydrography, and Archaeology. Vol. 2. London: Committee of the Palestine Exploration Fund.
- Department of Statistics (1945). Village Statistics, April, 1945. Government of Palestine.
- Guérin, V. (1875). Description Géographique Historique et Archéologique de la Palestine (in French). Vol. 2: Samarie, pt. 2. Paris: L'Imprimerie Nationale.
- Hadawi, S. (1970). Village Statistics of 1945: A Classification of Land and Area ownership in Palestine. Palestine Liberation Organization Research Center.
- Hütteroth, W.-D.; Abdulfattah, K. (1977). Historical Geography of Palestine, Transjordan and Southern Syria in the Late 16th Century. Erlanger Geographische Arbeiten, Sonderband 5. Erlangen, Germany: Vorstand der Fränkischen Geographischen Gesellschaft. ISBN 3-920405-41-2.
- Ibn al-Furat (1971). J. Riley-Smith (ed.). Ayyubids, Mamluks and Crusaders: Selections from the "Tarikh Al-duwal Wal-muluk" of Ibn Al-Furat : the Text, the Translation. Vol. 2. Translation by Malcolm Cameron Lyons, Ursula Lyons. Cambridge: W. Heffer.
- Khalidi, W. (1992). All That Remains: The Palestinian Villages Occupied and Depopulated by Israel in 1948. Washington D.C.: Institute for Palestine Studies. ISBN 0-88728-224-5.
- Masarwa, Durar (2008-01-08). "Khirbat Fardisya Final Report" (120). Hadashot Arkheologiyot – Excavations and Surveys in Israel.
- Massarwa, Abdallah (2009-06-07), Khirbat Fardisya Final Report, Hadashot Arkheologiyot – Excavations and Surveys in Israel
- Mills, E., ed. (1932). Census of Palestine 1931. Population of Villages, Towns and Administrative Areas. Jerusalem: Government of Palestine.
- Morris, B. (2004). The Birth of the Palestinian Refugee Problem Revisited. Cambridge University Press. ISBN 978-0-521-00967-6.
- Palmer, E.H. (1881). The Survey of Western Palestine: Arabic and English Name Lists Collected During the Survey by Lieutenants Conder and Kitchener, R. E. Transliterated and Explained by E.H. Palmer. Committee of the Palestine Exploration Fund.
- Pringle, D. (1986). The Red Tower (al-Burj Al-Ahmar): Settlement in the Plain of Sharon at the Time of the Crusaders and Mamluks A.D.1099-1516. University of Michigan. ISBN 0950054267.
- Robinson, E.; Smith, E. (1841). Biblical Researches in Palestine, Mount Sinai and Arabia Petraea: A Journal of Travels in the year 1838. Vol. 3. Boston: Crocker & Brewster.
- Röhricht, R. (1893). (RRH) Regesta regni Hierosolymitani (MXCVII-MCCXCI) (in Latin). Berlin: Libraria Academica Wageriana.
