= Dessouki =

Dessouki or El Dessouki is an Arabic surname carried by Sayyid families descendants of Imam al-Husayn through the intermediary of Sharaf al-Din Musa the brother of Sidi Ibrahim al-Dessouki, an Egyptian Sufi imam of the 13th century, founder of Burhaniyya or Desukiyya sufi order and one of the four centers of supervision of Sufism. This surname can also be worn by the heirs of this order or simply in relation to the town of Dessouk located in the Nile Delta where we find the mausoleum of Sidi Ibrahim al-Dessouki.

among the people who bear this name are:

- Salah Dessouki (1922–2011), Egyptian fencer
- Yehia Dessouki (born 1978), Egyptian painter and visual artist
- Ad-Desouki (died 1815), Egyptian jurist
- Nagwa El Desouki (born 1971), Swiss slalom canoer
