= Burhaniyya =

Islamic Sufi order

The Tariqa Burhāniyya (Arabic: الطريقة البرهانية الدسوقية الشاذلية Ṭarīqa al burhāniyya al disūqiyyah al shādhliyyah; also written al-Burhāniyya or Burhāniyyah) is a Sufi order founded by Mohamed Osman Abdu al Burhani (1902–1983) in Sudan.

== Origins ==
The order was renewed by the Sudanese Sheikh Mawlana Mohamed Osman Abdu al Burhani (1902–1983). After his death the leadership of the order passed to his son Sheikh Ibrahim as Sheikh Mohamed Osman Abdu al-Burhani. During the leadership of Sheikh Ibrahim the order was spreading also in other parts of the Arab Middle East, especially in Europe, North America ( United States, Canada) and South Asia (Pakistan, India).

Since 2003 the order is under the guidance of his grandson Sheikh Mohamed al Sheikh Ibrahim al Sheikh Mohamed Osman Abdu al-Burhani. The domicile of the European center of the order is located on the edge of the Lüneburg Heath in Germany.

== Views of religious institutions and scholars ==
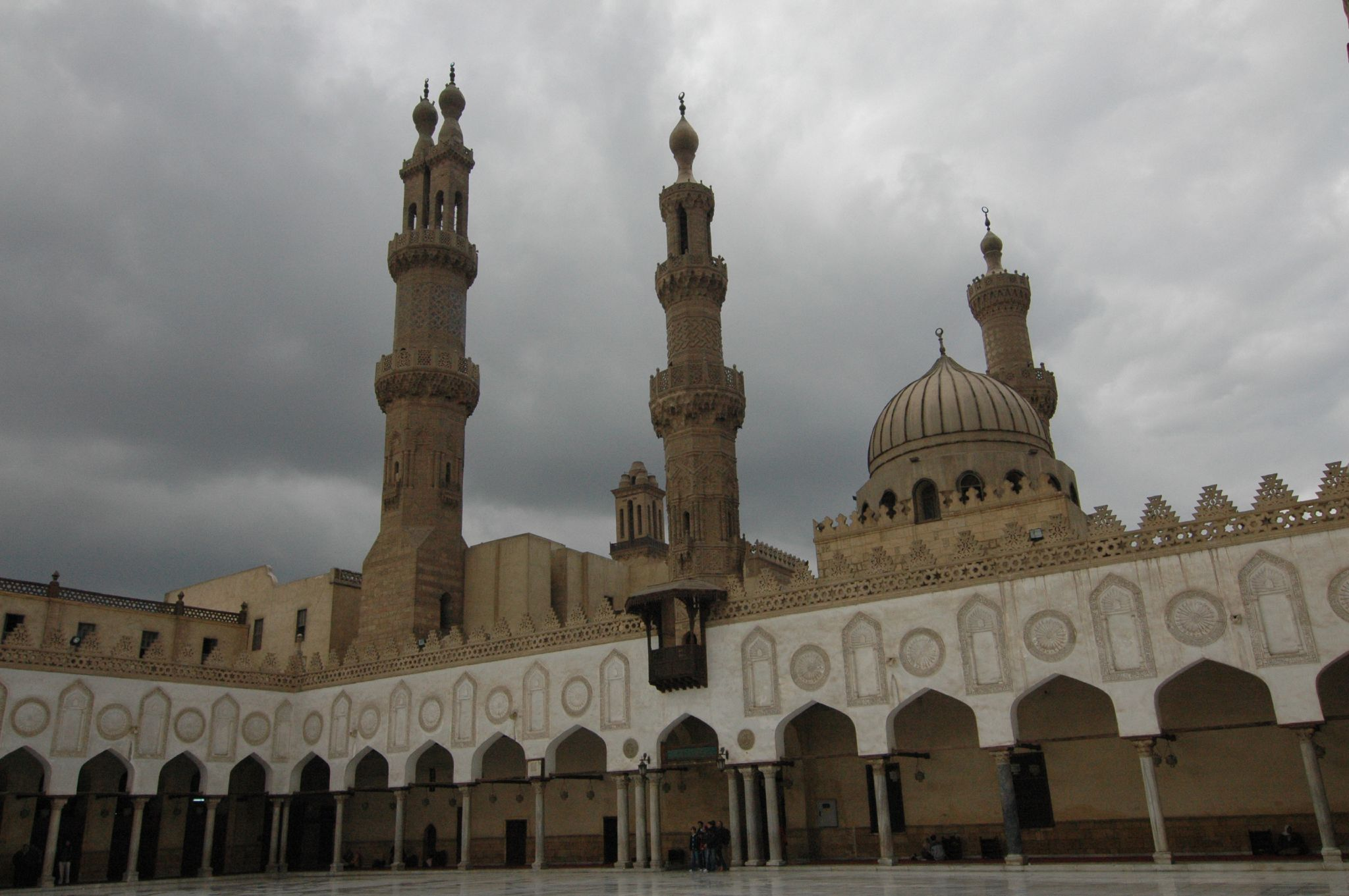
Al-Azhar warned against the Burhaniyya Desuqiyya Shadhiliyya order, describing it as a "deviant sect".

The Burhaniyya Desuqiyya Shadhiliyya order has been the subject of controversy among a number of Islamic religious institutions and Muslim scholars, particularly because of certain doctrines contained in the writings of its founder, Muhammad Uthman Abduh al-Burhani. In Egypt, Al-Azhar has attributed numerous doctrinal violations, religious practices, and theological claims to the order which—according to some Al-Azhar scholars—amount to explicit disbelief. Al-Azhar has also warned that the order differs from other Sufi orders and described it as a deviant sect. A similar opinion was issued by Shaykh Atiyya Saqr, one of Al-Azhar's scholars.

It has also been reported that the Islamic Research Academy examined the books Tabri'at al-Dhimma and Bata'in al-Asrar, attributed to Muhammad Uthman Abduh al-Burhani, and subsequently issued a decision prohibiting their circulation on the grounds that they contained statements contrary to Islamic doctrine. Some Islamic sources have also circulated texts attributed to the Academy containing a severe judgment against the author and the order associated with him, while other sources reported that the Academy declared their books to be contrary to Islam and pronounced takfir upon those who believe in their contents.

A number of Salafi scholars and authors of works on Islamic creed have also criticized the Burhaniyya order, arguing that some passages in its books attribute excessive status to saints (*awliya'*) and assign them characteristics that, in their view, belong exclusively to God. They based these criticisms on passages found in the order's writings and litanies.

The fatwas of Dar al-Ifta al-Misriyyah are consistent with those of Al-Azhar in permitting orthodox Sufism free from superstition. Dar al-Ifta does not object to affiliation with officially recognized Sufi orders, including the Desuqiyya order.

== See also ==
- History of Sufism
- Index of Sufism-related articles
- Muhammad ibn 'Arafa ad-Desouki (prominent late jurist of the Maliki school).
- Ibrahim El-Desouki
- Desouk
- Dessouki
- Desouk SC
