= Desouk Bridge =

Bridge in Desouk, Egypt

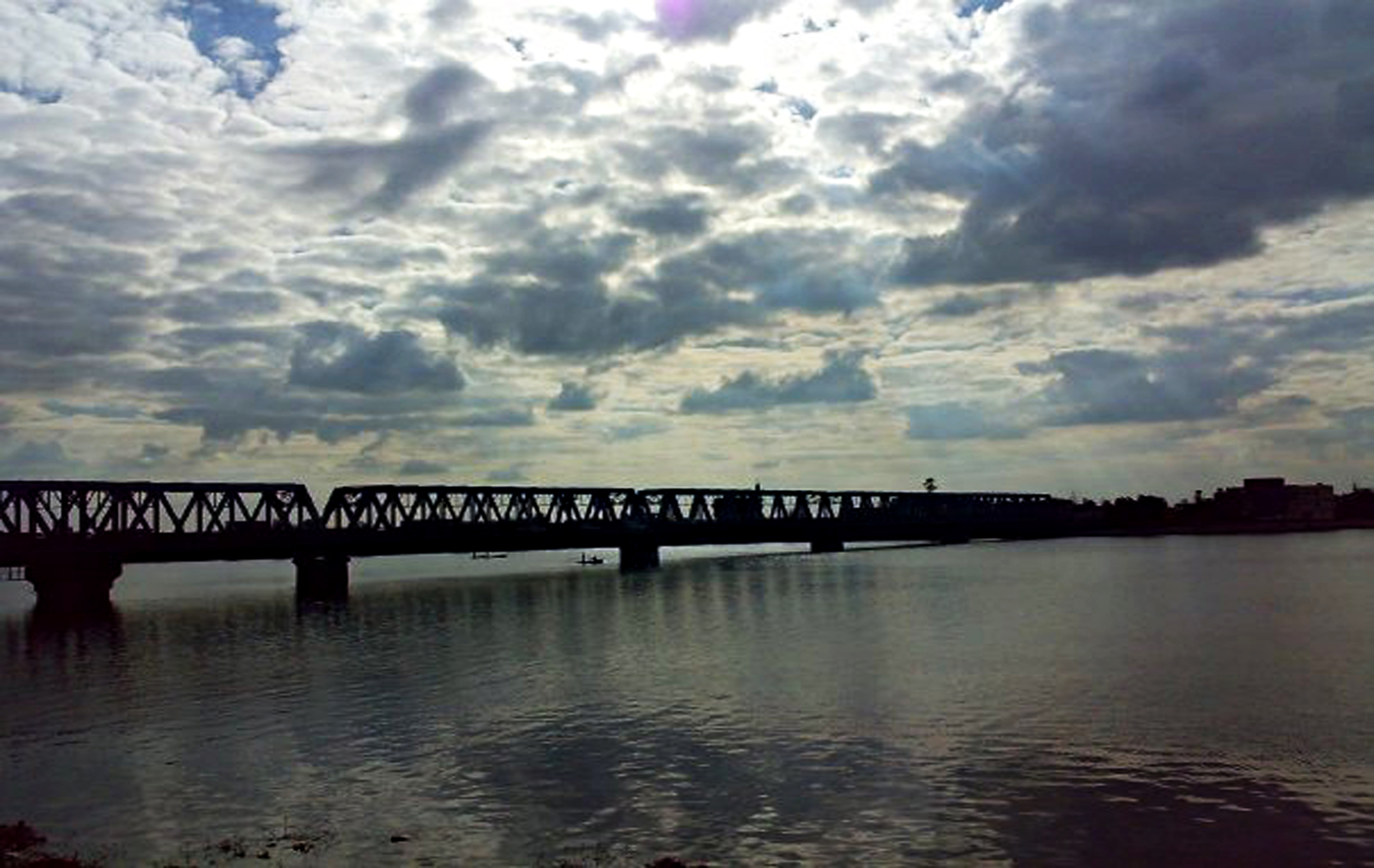
- Coordinates: 31°07′50″N 30°38′12″E
- Carries: Railway
- Crosses: Lower Nile
- Locale: Desouk

Characteristics
- Design: Truss bridge
- Total length: 610 metres

History
- Constructed by: Dorman Long
- Construction start: 1925
- Construction end: 1927
- Opened: 1927

Location
- Interactive map of Desouk Bridge

The Desouk Bridge is a steel truss bridge carrying the railway across the Lower Nile in Desouk, Egypt.

The Bridge consists of two bridges, not one, connects Desouk City with Rahmaniyah Markaz, with the Rahmaniyah Island linking them.

== History ==
The Egyptian government first established the bridge in 1897 during the reign of Khedive Abbas Helmi II, with the assistance of the French company La Maison Sereau-Louis, to accommodate fourth-class trains and also for single-track passage. In 1926, the government saw the necessity of replacing the metal parts of the bridge and constructing new metal parts supported by the old piers and girders, to accommodate first-class trains for the single track. Therefore, the government commissioned the company Dorman Long. It is 610 meters long.

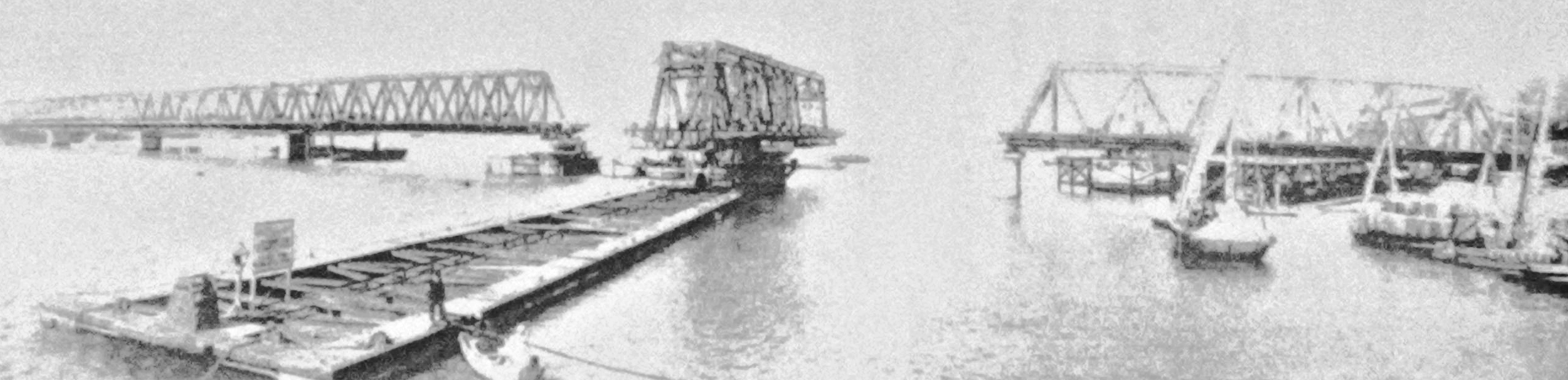
The bridge under construction
