= Diocese of Buto =

Roman Catholic and Coptic Orthodox titular see

The Diocese of Buto (Latin Butus, Greek Butos) is a former Christian diocese and titular see of both the Roman Catholic and Coptic Orthodox Churches, with see in the Ancient City of Buto in the Nile Delta of Egypt.

== Location ==
Buto, identified with Tell al-Fara'in ("Pharaohs' Mound") and the village of Ibtu or Abtu near the city of Desouk (Arabic: دسوق), was an ancient city in the Nile Delta, even one of the oldest cities on earth, with a history back to the Neolithic age.

During the Roman and Byzantine era it became the seat of an early Christian bishopric.

== History ==
During the Roman and Byzantine era there was a Bishopric based in the town of Buto, which was important enough in the Roman province of Aegyptus Primus to become one of the suffragans of its capital's Metropolitan, the Patriarchate of Alexandria. Lequien's Oriens Christianus identified Butus with Phthenothi, but according to Klaas A. Worp's list of Byzantine-era bishops in Egypt, Ftenote is a different see [not titular], which had the bishops Pininute(s,) (325), Agapius (343) and Eracleius (451), in which case the first-mentioned wasn't bishop of Butus.

Recorded bishops of Buto (with the above proviso) were :

- ? Pininute (mentioned in 325)
- Caius (in 325)
- Ammon, who attended the Council of Chalcedon,
- Tommasus (Thomas) (first mention 458 - 459)
- Teonas (in 459).

== Latin titular see ==
The diocese was nominally restored in 1933 as Latin Titular bishopric of Butus (Latin) / Buto (Curiate Italian) / Butien(sis) (Latin adjective) in the Roman Catholic Church.

It is vacant since decades, having had a single incumbent, of the fitting Episcopal (lowest) rank:

- František Tomášek (October 12, 1949 – June 27, 1977) as Auxiliary Bishop of the Archdiocese of Olomouc (now in the Czech Republic) (October 12, 1949 – December 30, 1977), spoke at the Second Vatican Council., Apostolic Administrator sede plena of the Archdiocese of Prague (February 18, 1965 – May 17, 1969) and Apostolic Administrator of Prague (May 17, 1969 – December 30, 1977); created Cardinal-Priest of Ss. Vitale, Valeria, Gervasio e Protasio (June 27, 1977 – death August 4, 1992), Metropolitan Archbishop of Prague (December 30, 1977 – retired March 27, 1991), President of Bishops’ Conference of Czechoslovakia (1990 – June 11, 1991).

== Oriental Orthodox titular see ==
The see remains a titular bishopric of the Coptic Orthodox Church of Alexandria.

== See also ==
- List of Catholic dioceses in Egypt
- Catholic Church in Egypt

== Sources and external links ==
- GCatholic - Butus - (former and) titular see
- Catholic-hierarchy.org - Butus
- Pius Bonifacius Gams, Series episcoporum Ecclesiae Catholicae, Leipzig, 1931, p. 460
