= Mohsen Hendawy =

Egyptian footballer (born 1981)

Personal information
- Date of birth: 20 March 1981 (age 45)
- Place of birth: Desouk, Egypt
- Height: 1.78 m (5 ft 10 in)
- Positions: Right-back; right midfielder

Youth career
- Desouk SC

Senior career*
Years	Team	Apps	(Gls)
2000–2003	Desouk SC		
2003–2008	Ghazl El Mahalla		
2008–2010	Tala'ea El Gaish		
2010–2012	Smouha	21	(1)

International career
2007	Egypt	3	(0)
- * Club domestic league appearances and goals

Mohsen Hendawy (born 20 March 1981) is an Egyptian former professional footballer who played as a right-back or right midfielder for Ghazl El Mahalla, Tala'ea El Gaish and Smouha. He made two appearances for the Egypt national team.
