= Pardesiya =

Pardesiya: פַּרְדֵּסִיָּה; بردسيا
- Local council (from 1952)

Hebrew transcription(s)
  - ISO 259: Pardesiya
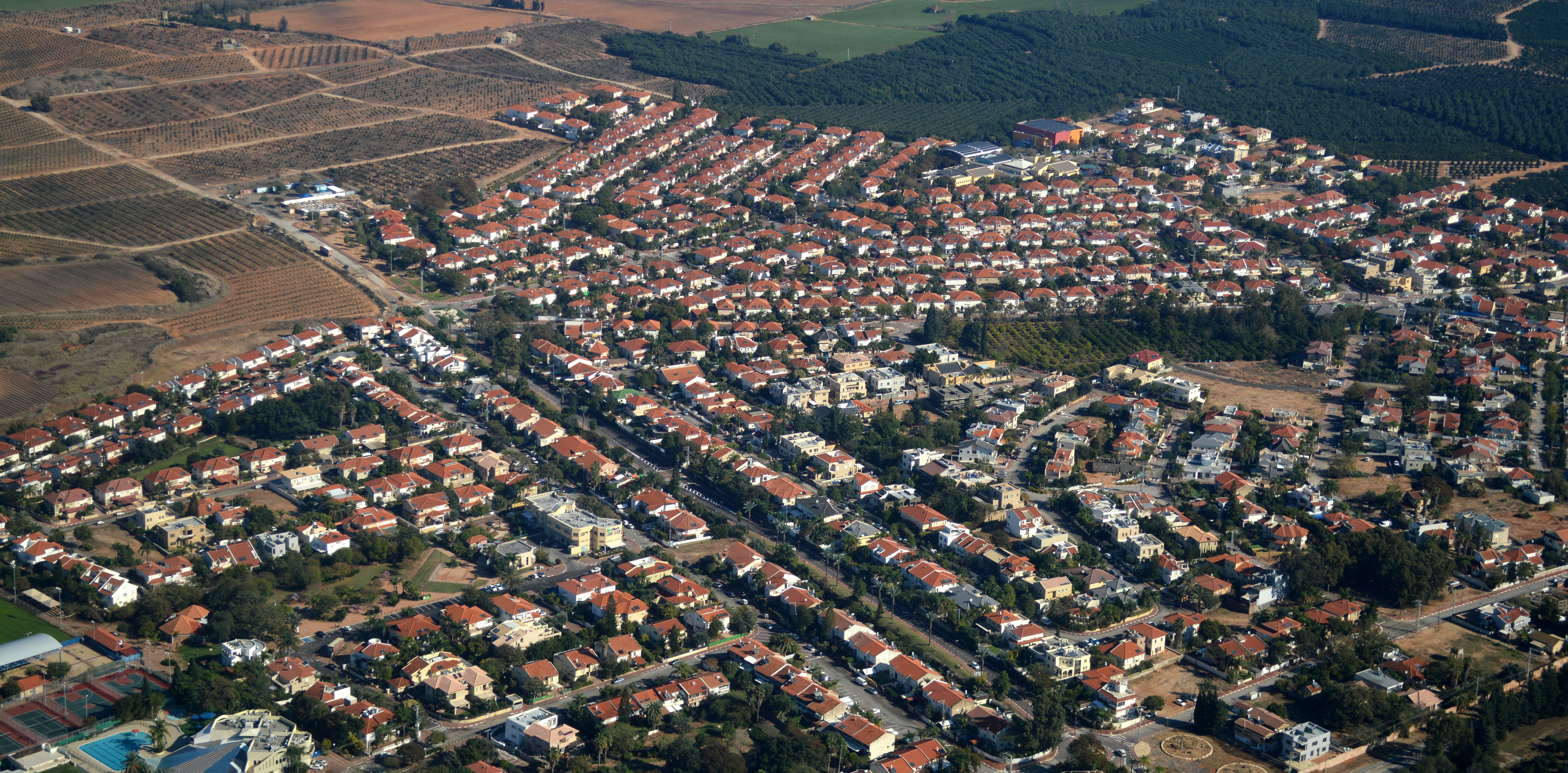

- Location within Central Israel Location within Israel
- Coordinates: 32°18′30″N 34°54′35″E
- Country: Israel
- District: Central
- Subdistrict: HaSharon
- Natural Region: Western Sharon
- Founded: 1938

Government
  - Head of Municipality: Tal Gorki

Area
  - Total: 1,273 dunams (1.273 km^{2}; 0.492 sq mi)

Population (2024)
  - Total: 7,973
  - Density: 6,263/km^{2} (16,220/sq mi)
- Name meaning: God's orchard

Pardesiya (Hebrew: פַּרְדֵּסִיָּה) is a town in the Central District of Israel. Located on the Sharon plain, between Kfar Yona and the Lev HaSharon Regional Council, it was founded between 1937 and 1939. In 2024 it had a population of 7,973; its jurisdiction is 1,273 dunams (~1.3 km^{2})

== History ==
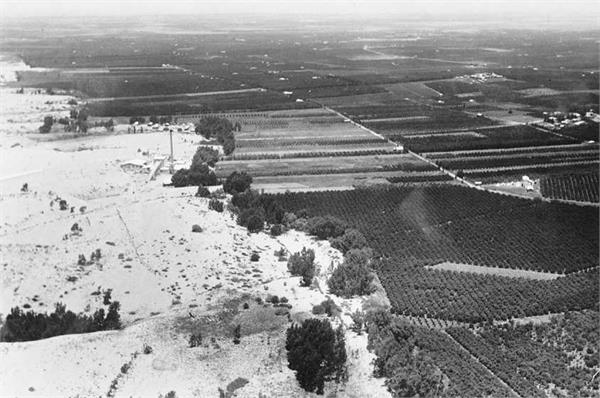
Pardesiya area 1939

Before the 20th century, Pardesiya (from Arabic, Ghabet Fardisya) formed part of the Forest of Sharon, a hallmark of the region's historical landscape. It was an open woodland dominated by Mount Tabor Oak (Quercus ithaburensis), which extended from Kfar Yona in the north to Ra'ananna in the south. The local Arab inhabitants traditionally used the area for pasture, firewood and intermittent cultivation. The intensification of settlement and agriculture in the coastal plain during the 19th century led to deforestation and subsequent environmental degradation known from Hebrew sources.

The lands of Pardesiya were purchased in 1928 by Jean-Yona Fisher, but remained unused. In 1937 Avraham Tabib of the Yemenite olim organization asked its members to come to the land to build a village, promising cheap land. Twenty families came and in 1939 completed the construction. During World War II, the villagers found themselves unemployed and unable to pay taxes for their housing. The residents managed to settle the issue with the Jewish Agency for Israel and continued living in the village. After the war, a new neighborhood was built, as well as a ma'abara to absorb new immigrants. Pardesiya gained local council status in 1952.

== Geography and location ==
Pardesiya is located on the Sharon plain, bordering Kfar Yona on the east and Tzur Moshe of the Lev HaSharon Regional Council. Highway 4 borders the town to the west, and Road 5613 to the south. Its elevation is 35 m above sea level.

== Demographics ==
As of 2008, Pardesiya settles 6,318 residents. 99.5% Jewish, with an additional 0.5% being other non-Arabs. The age distribution was as follows:

Age	0 - 4	5 - 9	10 - 14	15 - 19	20 - 29	30 - 44	45 - 59	60 - 64	65 - 74	75+
Percentage	5.9	8.4	11.3	11.8	16.9	17.2	23.8	2.0	1.5	1.2
Source: Israel Central Bureau of Statistics

== Voting Patterns ==
In the 2022 election, 64 percent of voters in Pardesiya voted for the parties of the center-left coalition led by Yair Lapid, while 33 percent voted for the parties of the right-wing coalition led by Benjamin Netanyahu and 0.1 percent voted for the Arab parties.

In the 2026 election, 65 percent of voters in Pardesiya voted for the parties of the center-left coalition led by Gadi Eisenkot, while 28 percent voted for the parties of the right-wing coalition led by Benjamin Netanyahu and 0.1 percent voted for the Arab parties. An additional 5.1 percent voted for the Reservists, and 1.7 percent voted for Amcha Yisrael. Voter turnout increased 10 percent from the 2022 election.

== International relations ==
Pardesiya's twin cities:

- Viersen, Germany

== Notable residents ==
- David Tiram, footballer
