= Buto =

Archaeological site in Egypt

- Βουτώ (Ancient Greek)
- Per-Wadjet; Butus; Tell El Fara'in
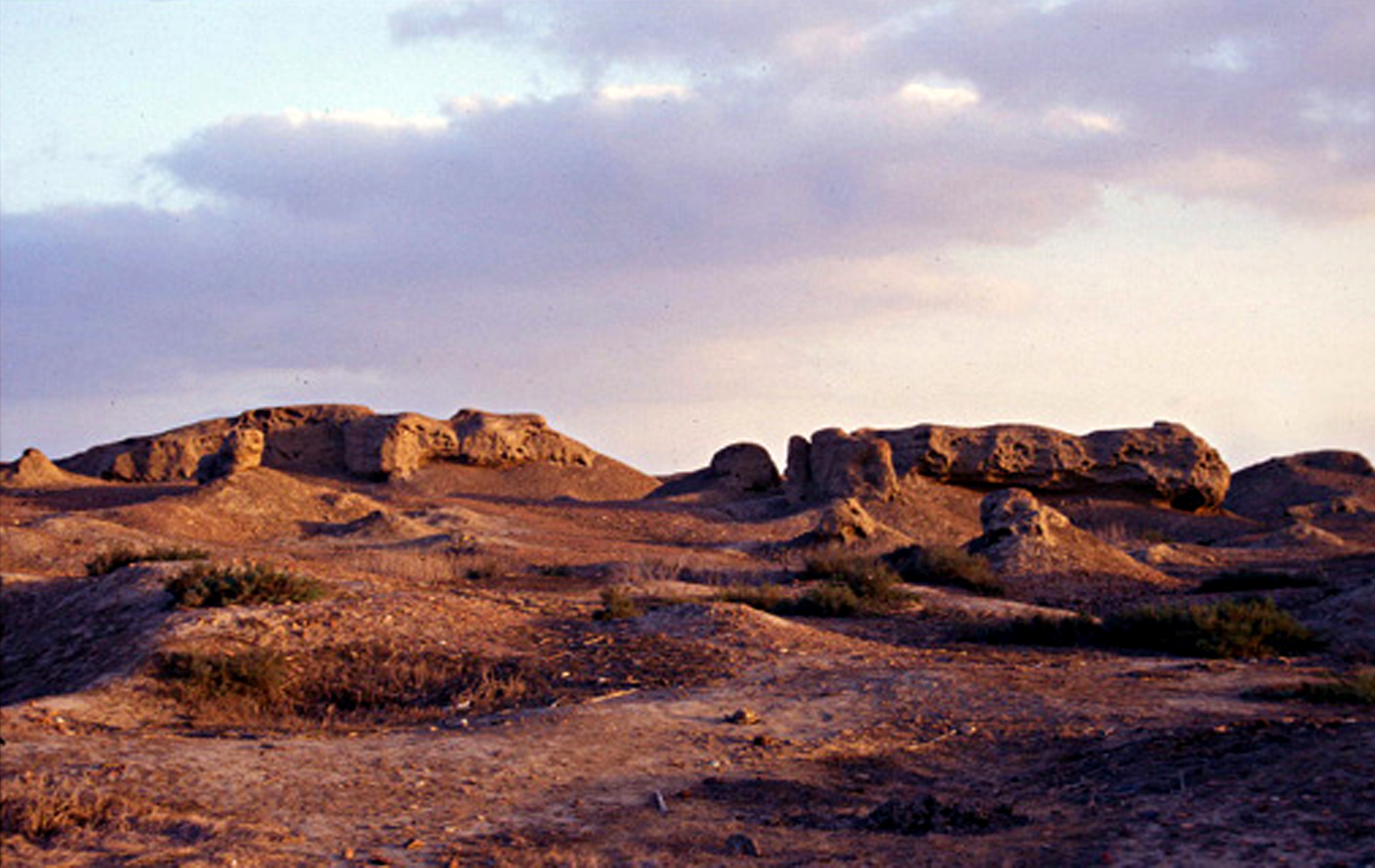
- View of Buto

- Location within Egypt
- 31°11′47″N 30°44′41″E
- Type: Settlement
- Location: Desouk, Egypt
- Region: Lower Egypt

Site notes
- Condition: In ruins

Buto (Ancient Greek: Βουτώ, Arabic: بوتو, Butu), Bouto, Butus (Ancient Greek: Βοῦτος, Boutos) or Butosus was a city in the northwestern Nile Delta that the Ancient Egyptians called Per-Wadjet. Today, it is called Tell El Fara'in ("Hill of the Pharaohs"), near the villages of Ibtu (or Abtu), Kom Butu, and the city of Desouk (Arabic: دسوق).

Buto was the main cult center of the cobra goddess Wadjet, and its Egyptian name, Per-Wadjet, means "House of Wadjet." In religion and myth, Buto represented the capital city of Lower Egypt, just as Hierakonpolis represented Upper Egypt. The site was first settled during the 4th millennium BCE, and gives its name to the prehistoric Buto-Ma'adi culture.

During the Early Dynastic Period, the city held a walled palace complex at least 50 m wide. Archaeological evidence shows settlement at Buto from the Predynastic period into the early Old Kingdom, and then again in the 8th century BCE through the Roman Period. No settlement remains have been found for a period of 1500 years, suggesting town life was abandoned and left the Wadjet temple standing. The cause of this settlement gap is uncertain, but partial flooding (possibly Nile branch shifting) towards the end of the Old Kingdom points to environmental reasons. However, New Kingdom texts, royal statues in the temple area, and lasting importance of the temple of Wadjet suggest the site remained in religious use. The town grew again under the Saite kings of the 26th Dynasty and later in the Greco-Roman period, but occupation appears to have ended around the 6th-7th century CE.

Buto has been through a series of excavations and research by Egyptian, German, British, and French archaeologists since the late 19th century, including the Egypt Exploration Society (EES) in the 1960s and the German Archaeological Institute from the 1980s onward. Since 2018, the Kafrelsheikh University has combined modern technology of satellite radar, geophysical surveys, and excavations to find buried features and religious artifacts.

Map of Buto located in the northwestern Nile Delta

== Geography ==
The ancient city Buto is situated in the northwestern Nile Delta of Egypt. In addition, it rests approximately 15 km east of the Nile's Rosetta branch and 30 km south of today's coastline (31°12′ N, 30°45′ E). This archaeological site is also placed in the Delta's floodplain, where the protruding hill of Buto protected ancient peoples from the Nile's annual flooding by being above the landscape. Buto's site is referred to as a tell, a multilayered settlement made up of old ruins and structures accumulating over time. The Arabic words tell and kom both mean hills or mounds.

Topographical map of Buto showing the northern and southern settlement mounds (Kom A and C), and the temple area (Kom B).

The whole site is a raised mound that covers about 1 km², consisting of features such as a temple precinct, a cemetery, and two settlement mounds that are as tall as 20 m above the fields. The two mounds are known as Kom A (northern) and Kom C (southern) settlement mounds, and the low-lying temple area is referred to as Kom B. A cemetery takes up an area in the western section of the Kom A, and dates to period of the late first millennium BCE to the late Roman period. Moreover, there is a Muslim cemetery and two modern villages (Sekhmawy and Mohammed el-Baz) that reside right on the border of the site. Geological research discovered that Buto sits on top of a large underlying sand formation that developed during the late Pleistocene and/or early to mid-Holocene.

== Mythology/Religious Significance ==
Archaeologist Ulrich Hartung describes Buto as a cultural and religious site, assumed to be the archaic capital of Lower Egypt. From the late New Kingdom, Buto was known as Per-Wadjet to the Egyptians, which translates to "House of the (Goddess) Wadjet." The goddess Wadjet was also known as Uto, so "House of Uto" became the town's name in the Ramesside period (13th century BCE), which later became the Greek name Buto.

The cobra goddess Wadjet was the patron deity of Lower Egypt, and especially Buto. Not only was the city named after her, but many artifacts found on the site point to her, such as a lioness-headed female figure amulet likely depicting Wadjet. Her oracle was located in a temple in this area, while Abouarab and Wilson mention that, according to other sources, there were shrines to Horus and Bastet.

An illustration of Wadjet based on depictions in tombs.

Archaeologist Mohamed Abouarab and others discovered a small offering basin along with multiple religious amulets of Isis, Horus, Taweret, and Wadjet on Kom C, supporting the idea of a possible secondary temple during the 26th Dynasty. In connection to Egypt's broader religious significance, Wadjet was paired with the goddess Nekhbet of Upper Egypt and became known as the Two Ladies, who together remained the patrons of unified Egypt throughout the remainder of its ancient history.

Amulets and figurines from the Saite period (26th Dynasty) structure excavated on Kom C at Buto.

The temple of Wadjet stood in the low-lying temple precinct (Kom B). It was enclosed by a mudbrick wall covering an area of 300x200 m, with its walls standing higher than 10m and as wide as 17-25 m. This enclosure is believed to date to the Late period, with inside structures likely built during the Ptolemaic times, such as a double staircase that guides to two wells that may have served as a nilometer. Other remains inside include a stone pavement and inner enclosure wall thought to be built in the 26th Dynasty. Stone artifacts were discovered throughout the temple precinct, including a stela of Thutmose III, multiple large statues of Ramesses II, a granite lion goddess head, statues of a hawk and two sphinxes, and a Late period statue of a priest of Wadjet. The temple remained in use while the town was abandoned, but was last mentioned in the "Satrap Stela" before being taken apart in early Roman times.

== History ==
=== Predynastic Period (Buto-Ma'adi Culture) ===
The earliest occupation areas (Layers I-II) are located just below the western edge of the tell, dating back to the middle to late fourth millennium BCE, which was the same time as the Naqada IIb-IId phases during Upper Egypt's Predynastic culture. However, the structures and artifacts convey Buto belonged to a different Lower Egyptian Predynastic culture that was initially discovered south of Cairo at the Ma'adi site. Although the culture was first known from Ma'adi, it has also been found at places in the Delta and the Fayum region. Since their material cultures had slight variations and timelines, modern archaeologists named the culture after both settlements, getting "Buto-Ma'adi." The Buto-Maadi culture was the most important Lower Egyptian prehistoric culture during the 4th millennium BCE.

Their culture was also strongly marked by Levantine influences, in particular in the area of ceramics. This Lower Egyptian Predynastic culture was specifically marked by the evidence of houses made of wattle and daub, blade tools, and small amounts of copper imported from Palestine (Araba region in southern Jordan). Pottery with indented rims came from the Chalcolithic of southern Palestine, while potsherds with white horizontal stripes were believed to be a method inspired by northern Syria. Decorative fired clay cones from Buto, used to make mosaics, were similar to those found in Mesopotamia at Uruk.

Archaeological evidence shows that the Upper Egyptian Naqada culture replaced the Buto-Maadi culture (also known as the "Lower Egyptian Cultural Complex"), perhaps after a conquest. Excavations show a change in artifacts from Lower Egyptian to Upper Egyptian (Naqada) styles, followed by more use of mudbrick. However, Thomas von der Way interprets this transitional phase as cultural assimilation, dating the shift to circa 3300-3200 BCE (Naqada IId phase).

=== Early Dynastic Period ===
The German Archaeological Institute excavations found a series of buildings at Buto dating to the beginning of the 1st Dynasty. At the start of the 1st Dynasty, rooms had few installations other than fireplaces compared to the following phase. Over time, these structures developed from simple rectangular rooms into large, walled complexes at least 50 m wide and the addition of courtyards. One building with complex room arrangements was excavated over an area of 25x10 m, with surviving walls up to 60 cm tall, and both plaster and colored decoration. There was also a bigger building connected to administrative purposes, supported by seal impressions that convey bureaucratic elements and resource control.

Plan of Early Dynastic building complex at Buto (late 1st to middle of 2nd Dynasty, Naqada IIIC3/IIID), interpreted by Ulrich Hartung as a palace.

Besides the new organization of courtyards surrounded by rooms or houses of different sizes, the general layout stayed largely the same throughout the first half of the 1st Dynasty. Installations of daily life that marked this phase were fireplaces, ovens for bread, vats, ground storage vessels, round granaries, and postholes, and workshops. The courtyard space may have been used for communal work, food storages were linked to individual houses, and larger rooms were possibly workshops.

In the second half of the 1st Dynasty, the area was destroyed and leveled out to build a large planned building complex, with maze-like arrangements of small rooms ("labyrinth building") and a possible reception hall. Hartung interprets the long, narrow corridor leading to the reception hall was an intentional prestigious element as it accentuated the social distance from owner and visitors. Some rooms contained drill heads for stone vessel production and others had limestone slabs that were possible statue bases, indicating workshop and cultic roles. Hartung describes the complex as an Early Dynastic Palace because of its typical economic, administrative, and religious functions of later palaces.

Around the middle of the 2nd Dynasty, an intense fire devastated major areas of the complex. Although some rooms were repaired, others stayed destroyed. Large pits with late 2nd/3rd Dynasty material culture point to the abandonment of this area of the complex, as the ruins were used as a waste site or for sourcing stones and mudbrick. Hartung expresses that the site's different construction phases show increasing organization and enhanced expressions of power over time. Pottery was used for dating the complex, suggesting the palace functioned from the late 1st Dynasty to the middle of the 2nd Dynasty.

=== Old to New Kingdom ===
Buto during the Old Kingdom was characterized by decline and abandonment. Von der Way explains that it likely lost its political importance around the Old kingdom, and is not mentioned in any Middle Kingdom texts. The next time Buto appears again is in the New Kingdom texts in the 18th Dynasty. Abouarab considers Baines and Schiestl's interpretations that the settlement was abandoned for approximately 1500 years, while only Wadjet's temple remained.

Although no one knows for sure what caused this occupation gap, flooding in the late Old Kingdom led archaeologists to believe the reasoning for leaving was environmental change or even a shift in a branch of the Nile. Excavation surveys reported by Von der Way did not uncover any proof of a Middle or New Kingdom settlement.

=== Third Intermediate and Late Periods ===
There appears to be a resettlement in the late 700s BCE of the Third Intermediate Period. This era was memorable by its small buildings, heavy layers of ash, ovens, and pits carved out into older structural ruins. In the Late period, archaeologists found domestic areas and very large thick-walled buildings, with walls being 2m or more and interpreted as possible platforms.

==== The Saite Period ====
Higher levels of activity are found during the Saite period (26th Dynasty) in the 7th-6th centuries BCE. On Kom C, a Saite mudbrick building was constructed on an artificial sand foundation, showing the ground was leveled out on purpose for construction. Abouarab cites Hartung's suggestion that all of Buto was being put to use during the Saite period.

=== Greco-Roman Period ===
The name Buto is the Greek form of the Egyptian name Per-Wadjet, while earlier names for the site were Pe and Dep, and an even older name was Djebaut, used in the 4th millennium BCE. During the Ptolemaic Kingdom, a Greek-speaking dynasty that ruled from 305 to 30 BCE, Buto or "Land of Uto" served as the capital of the "Phthenotes" nome. Herodotus styled it the Chemmite nome, Ptolemy knew it as the Phthenothite nome (Φθενότης), and Pliny the Elder as Ptenetha.

Greek historians recorded that Buto was celebrated for its monolithic temple and the oracle of the goddess Wadjet, and a yearly festival was held there in honour of the goddess. Writing during the Greco-Roman period, Plutarch reported that Isis had entrusted the baby Horus to "Leto" (Wadjet) to raise at Buto while Isis searched for the body of her murdered husband Osiris. According to these same late sources, the shrew (sometimes associated with Horus) was worshiped at Buto as well.

What in classical times the Greeks called Buto, stood about midway between the Taly (Bolbitine) and Thermuthiac (Sebennytic) branches of the Nile, a few kilometers north of the east-west Butic River, and on the southern shore of the Butic Lake (Greek: Βουτικὴ λίμνη, Boutikē limnē).

Magnetometer survey found that during the Ptolemaic and Roman periods, western parts of Koms A and C were major settlement and industrial areas. Southwest of the city, a Ptolemaic wall stretches past the modern mounds, implying that Buto was much larger than it is today during this Greco-Roman time. Intense occupation was marked by surface potsherds at Buto during the Greco-Roman period, but these materials decreased greatly by the 4th century CE. Habitation most likely ended around the 6th century CE, but Abouarab et al. dates the latest evidence to the Early Islamic Period in the 7th century.

== Archeology ==
A palace building dating to the Second Dynasty is considered one of the most important discoveries within Buto. Archaeological excavations were undertaken at Buto by the Egypt Exploration Society from 1964–1969, under the direction of Veronica Seton-Williams and later, by Dorothy Charlesworth. The German Archaeological Institute, Cairo has been excavating at Buto since the early 1980s. Six Greek bathhouses also were excavated by different missions in Buto.

=== History of Excavations ===
Ever since the 19th century, Buto has been investigated by numerous Egyptian, German, British, and French missions.

- 1886 – W. M. Flinders Petrie travels to Buto for a short visit. Based on the topography of the site's northern and southern mounds, he was the first to suggest this place could have been the ancient twin cities, Pe and Dep.
- 1904 – Charles Trick Currelly conducted the first test excavations on the site of Buto.
- 1964-1969 – Excavations done by Veronica Seton-Williams and Dorothy Charlesworth under the Egypt Exploration Society. Majority of this project uncovered Ptolemaic and Roman remains at the temple area, with some Early Dynastic finds. Specifically, they found a cylinder seal of an official of Dep, which pointed to the site being much older than previously thought. EES also discovered public baths at two complexes.
- Early 1980s – W. Kaiser started the investigations of Buto's early history.
- 1982 – Excavations carried out by the Universities of Alexandria and Tanta, and the Egyptian Antiquities Organization (EAO). Their work was done at the temple and cemetery parts with findings dating from the Late to Roman periods.
- 1983 – Survey work began by the German Archaeological Institute (DAI), Cairo and the Geographical Department of the University of Marburg, Germany.
- 1985 – Thomas von der Way (with DAI) began excavating at Buto, following a drilling survey that examined the site's settlement mound and its surrounding landscape. He used a pumping system to get to earliest remains below the water table, as well as named the complicated walled-layout "labyrinth-building." From Von der Way's written entry on Buto, he describes the layer sequence found as:

Sequence	Time
Layers I–II	The Predynastic of Lower Egypt (second half of the fourth millennium BCE)
Layer III–V	Late Predynastic/Dynasty 0 (Nagada III phase) / Early Dynastic (end of the fourth millennium BCE and first centuries of the third millennium BCE)
Layer VI	Early Old Kingdom (27th–26th centuries BCE)
Layer VII	Late period (7th–4th centuries BCE)

- 1993-1998 – D. Faltings continued field work at Buto, excavating a larger building that had possible administrative purposes.
- 1999 onward – Excavations were conducted by Ulrich Hartung (DAI). Auger drillings and geophysical measurements were done to understand Buto's development and topographical environment. This expansion of field work showed that labyrinth-building was part of an Early Dynastic palace complex.
- 2021 – Kafrelsheikh University alongside Ministry of Tourism and Antiquities excavated Kom C.

=== Modern Findings/Artifacts ===
In recent years, archaeologists from Kafrelsheikh University have used non-invasive methods to figure out where buried remains were before digging. They took a radar satellite image of Buto in May 2018, revealing a buried feature on Kom C. In addition, they used electrical resistivity tomography (ERT) to map underground structures and identify buried mud brick walls.

In 2021, excavations by Kafrelsheikh University and Ministry of Tourism and Antiquities recovered terracotta god and goddess figurines, Nile silt vessels, a scarab, and amulets of deities and hybrid animals. One faience amulet with light turquoise/blue-green glaze represented features of the gods Thoth, Horus, and Ptah-Pataikos, which may have had protective qualities when worn. They also found a lioness headed female figure that is assumed to be the goddess Wadjet in a red colored faience, and a copper alloy figure of the Horus Child. The abundance of religious material culture conveys religious function of structures on site such as shrines. This emphasized the lasting significance of gods like Horus, Isis, Bes, and Beset that continued from ancient Egypt into the Roman period.

In 2022, excavations over an area of 6.5m x 4.5m uncovered the remains of an ancient hall lined with pillars within the larger temple structure. The hall contained the remains of three surviving columns, aligned on a north-south axis at the southwestern end of the temple. A number of stone fragments decorated with engravings where found, as well as numerous ceramics and pottery associated with ritual activity. In a press release issued by the Ministry of Tourism and Antiquities, archaeologists also found a limestone painting with the representation of a bird’s head wearing a white crown surrounded by feathers.

In November 2026, researchers investigating the ancient Egyptian city of Buto (Tell el-Fara’in) in the northwestern Nile Delta identified a buried structure dating to approximately 2,600 years ago, during the Saite period (664–525 BCE). The research combined radar imagery from the Sentinel-1 satellite with electrical resistivity tomography (ERT), a geophysical technique used to map underground structures by measuring variations in electrical resistance. Satellite data revealed potential archaeological anomalies, which were subsequently investigated through ground-based surveys and targeted excavation. The excavations uncovered mudbrick walls and a collection of religious objects, including amulets representing deities such as Isis, Horus, Taweret and Wadjet. One object depicted a hybrid figure combining features of a baboon, a falcon and the dwarf deity Patikos. The presence of ritual objects and an altar suggests that the building may have served a religious function, possibly as a temple, a priestly residence or a complex associated with funerary activities.

== See also ==
- List of ancient Egyptian towns and cities
- Diocese of Buto for ecclesiastical history and current titular sees
- Kafr El Sheikh Governorate
- Sais, Egypt

== Bibliography ==
Abouarab, Mohamed A. R., Abdelaziz Elfadaly, Waleed Elbehery, Osama Wafa, Ibrahim Aboalkassim, Ali Younes, Amira M. A. Hiekl, Saada Ahmed Saada, Penelope Wilson, and Amin Ibrahim. “Multi‐scale Detection of Buried Archaeological Elements Across Different Occupation Phases: An Integrated Approach Using Radar Satellite Imagery and Electric Resistivity Tomography at Buto, Northwestern Nile Delta of Egypt.” Acta Geophysica 74 (2026): 112. https://doi.org/10.1007/s11600-026-01809-4

Abouarab, Mohamed A. R., and Penelope Wilson. “Finds from Recent Excavations at Tell Fara‘in-Buto.” Journal of Humanities and Literary Studies 32, no. 1 (2025): 1114-1134. https://doi.org/10.21608/shak.2025.405817.1830

Hartung, Ulrich. “Recent Investigations of Early Dynastic Building Structures at Tell el-Fara‘in/Buto.” In Ancient Egyptian and Ancient Near Eastern Palaces, vol. 1, edited by Manfred Bietak and Silvia Prell, 101-112. Vienna: Austrian Academy of Sciences, 2018. https://www.academia.edu/38163260/Recent_Investigations_of_Early_Dynastic_Building_Structures_at_Tell_el_Farain_Buto?source=swp_share

Von der Way, Thomas. “Buto (Tell el-Fara’in).” In Encyclopedia of the Archaeology of Ancient Egypt, edited by Kathryn A. Bard, 208-213. London: Routledge, 1999.
