= Rahmaniyah Island =

Coordinates: 31°7′9″N 30°38′28″E

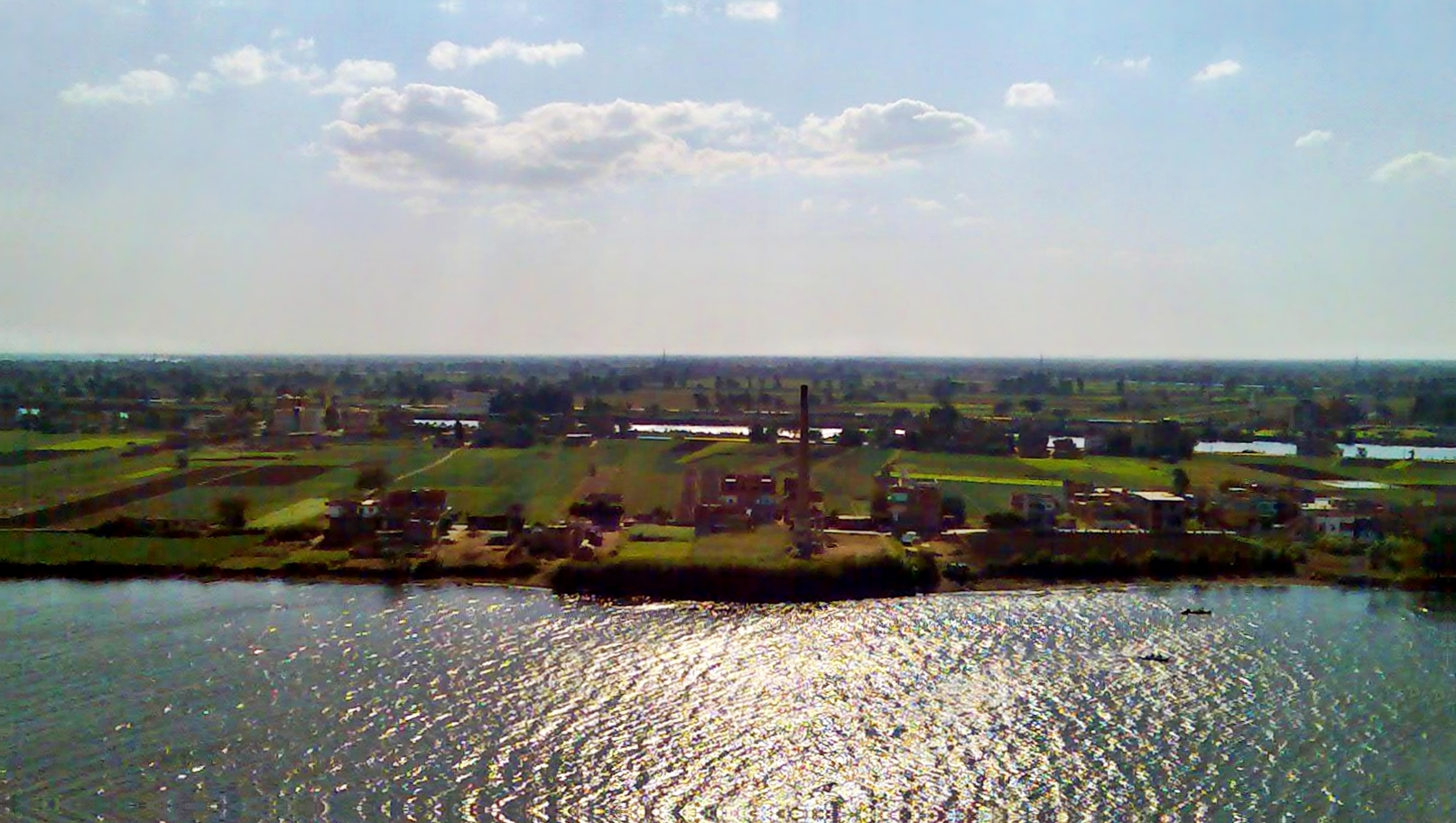
Rahmaniyah Island in 2008

Rahmaniyah Island of Jazīrat ar Raḩmānīyah (Arabic: جزيرة الرحمانية) is an island in the Rosetta branch of the Nile River in Egypt, Markaz (region) of Rahmaniya in Beheira Governorate. It is located just south of Desouk City and north of El Rahmaniya and rolled by OBaid and Saqer.
