= Ibrahim El Desouki Mosque =

Mosque in Desouk, Egypt

Sidi Ibrahim El Desouki Mosque
- مسجد سيدي إبراهيم الدسوقي
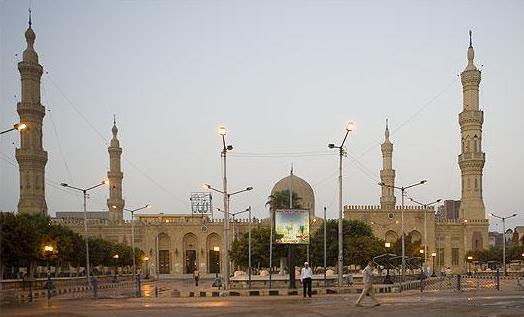

- Location of the mosque in the Nile Delta

Religion
- Affiliation: Sunni Islam
- Rite: Sufism
- Ecclesiastical or organizational status: Mosque; Shrine
- Status: Active
- Dedication: Ibrahim al-Dasuqi

Location
- Location: Desouk, Kafr El Sheikh Governorate
- Country: Egypt
- Interactive map of Sidi Ibrahim El Desouki Mosque
- Coordinates: 31°07′43″N 30°38′47″E

Architecture
- Type: Mosque
- Style: Mamluk
- Completed: 1277 CE

Specifications
- Dome: 1
- Minaret: 4
- Shrine: 1: (Ibrahim al-Dasuqi)

The Sidi Ibrahim El Desouki Mosque (Arabic: مسجد سيدي إبراهيم الدسوقي) is a Sufi mosque and shrine complex located in Desouk, in the Kafr El Sheikh Governorate of Egypt. The name of this mosque is derived from the Sufi mystic and Ash'ari scholar Ibrahim al-Dasuqi, who is buried in the shrine of the building alongside his brother, Sharaf al-Din Musa. Built in 1277 CE, during the Mamluk era, the mosque is one of the oldest mosques in Egypt.

== History ==
The original structure dates from the Mamluk era, and it was originally a small mosque that included a khanqah for Ibrahim al-Dasuqi, which was built next to it on the orders of Sultan Qalawun. When Al-Dasuqi died, he was buried in the khanqah, and later on, his brother Sharaf al-Din was buried next to him. During the reign of Sultan Qaytbay, the mosque was expanded while the khanqah was demolished and turned into a new Sufi shrine.

During the reign of Tewfik Pasha as Khedive, the mosque was restored and it was almost entirely rebuilt. In 2018, the mosque was renovated by Arab Contractors, an Egyptian regional construction company.

== Architecture ==
The mosque is divided into two wings, which are gender segregated; a wing for men, and a wing for women. The mosque has two buildings on an area of 600 square metres (6,500 sq ft), which is separated by the shrine building containing the tomb of Ibrahim al-Dasuqi and his brother Sharaf al-Din Musa. The mosque has four minarets and one large dome. There are eleven main doors on all sides, and there is also a lounge for special visitors. A large Islamic library is present as well.

== Gallery ==
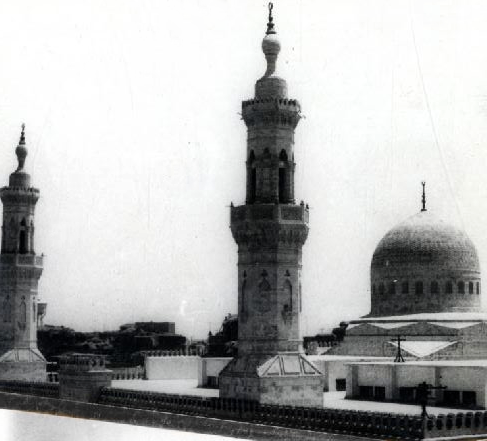
Minarets and dome, 1979

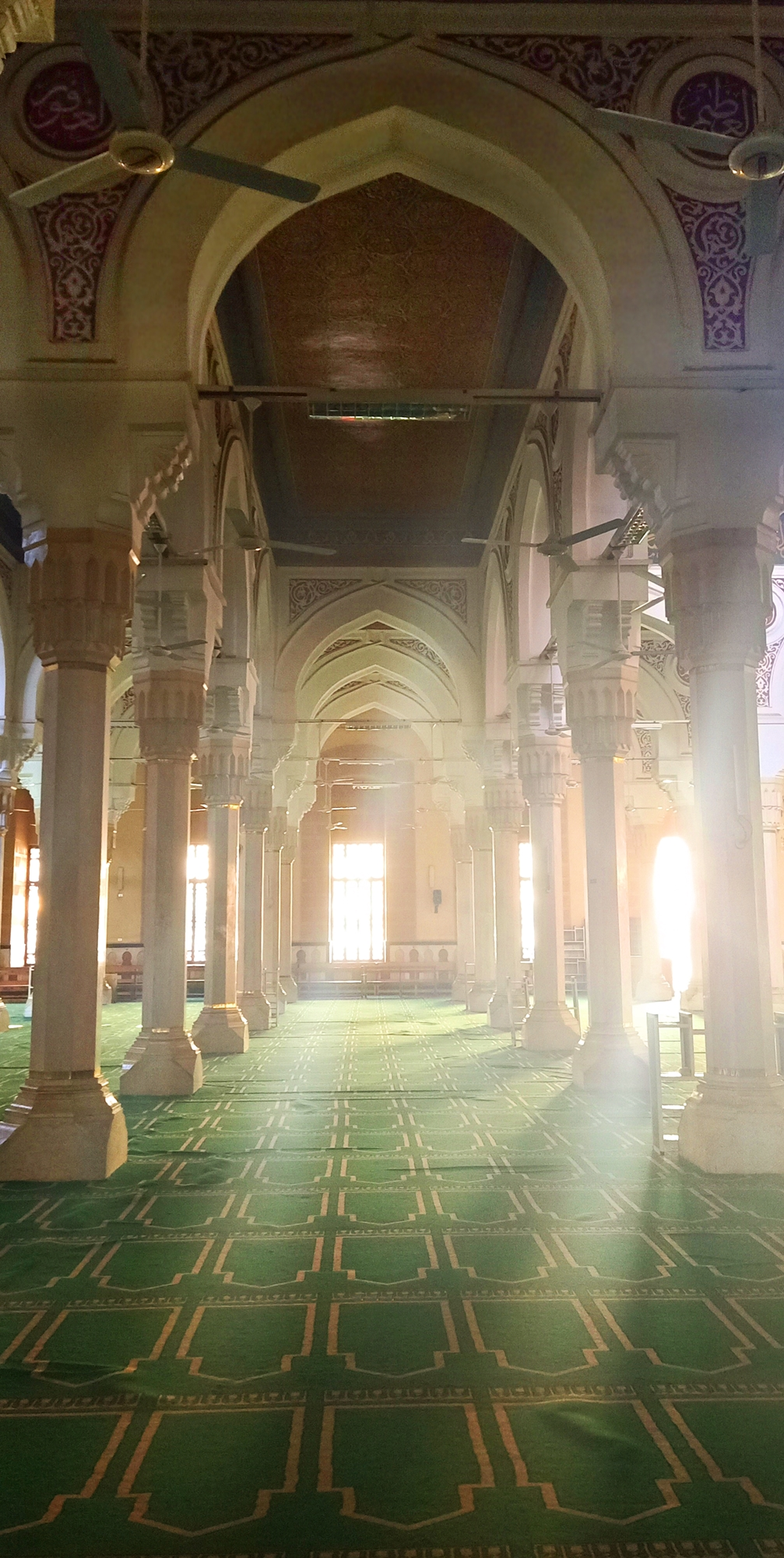
View of the interior, 2022

== See also ==
- Desouki
- Islam in Egypt
- List of mosques in Egypt
