= Dorothy Charlesworth =

Archaeologist

Dorothy Charlesworth FSA
- Charlesworth in the grounds of the Wallsfoot Hotel, 1976.
- Born: 1927; Northumberland
- Died: 1981 (aged 53–54)
- Education: Cheltenham Ladies' College, Somerville College, Oxford
- Scientific career
- Fields: Roman archaeology

Dorothy Charlesworth FSA (1927–1981) was a Roman archaeologist and glass specialist who served as Inspector of Ancient Monuments. She worked within Britain and Egypt.

== Early life and education ==
Born and brought up in Northumberland, the daughter of John Charlesworth, a county court judge and academic lawyer, Dorothy Charlesworth was educated at Cheltenham Ladies' College and Somerville College, Oxford. She took an interest in the study of ancient glass with the encouragement of Donald Benjamin Harden, for whom she then worked at Oxford and London.

== Career ==
Charlesworth was appointed by the British Committee on Ancient Glass to undertake the British census of ancient glass, which was completed in 1955 although its publication was prevented by the committee's lack of funds.

In 1965 she joined the Egypt Exploration Society's excavations at Buto (Tell el-Farâ'în), taking part in each season's excavation until it ended in 1969. At Buto, she supervised the excavation of the furnace site, and published her findings. While in Cairo she recorded the working of a local 'primitive' glass furnace, comparing its functioning with that of a contemporary furnace at Damascus, and with medieval glasshouse furnaces in Britain. In the final year of excavations at Buto she became field director, taking over from Veronica Seton-Williams. Alongside her work in Egypt, she continued to work with Donald Benjamin Harden, publishing a summary of his catalogue for the 1969 British Museum exhibition Masterpieces of Glass.

Once the excavations at Buto had concluded, Charlesworth focused on her work within Britain. She first held a Leverhulme research fellow at the Museum of London, before serving as Inspector of Ancient Monuments. Under these auspices she directed excavations within northern Britain, notably Carlisle, where she discovered the south gate and rampart of the Roman fort in Carlisle, finally locating the fort's exact position. Here she discovered surviving timbers that could be dated by dendrochronology, and shown to have been felled in the autumn or winter of AD72/3. These offered new evidence in the debate over the chronology of the Roman conquest of northern Britain, which may have been under Petillius Cerialis, or Agricola. At Housesteads she excavated the Commandant's house and the hospital with John Wilkes in the late 1960s and 1970s. She also excavated Carrawburgh fort, Hadrian's Wall turret 51A (Piper Sike) in 1970 34A (West Grindon) in 1971, and 29A (Black Carts). Excavation of Hadrian's Wall at Walton was carried out under her direction in the 1970s.

Charlesworth was one of the founding members of the Association for the History of Glass in 1978, and served as its Secretary from 1979 to 1981. As well as her expert contributions to the study of ancient glass, she also wrote for a more general readership, contributing to guidebooks, e.g., for the museum at the Roman site of Wall in Staffordshire (1958), Aldborough Roman town and Museum, Yorkshire (1970) and Hardknott Fort (1972), and provided archaeological research for the publication of the Roman Inscriptions of Britain.

A memorial lecture was held in her name by the Cumberland and Westmorland Archaeological Society in 1982.

== Publications ==
- Charlesworth, Dorothy (1967) Excavations on the Carrawburgh car park site, 1964. in Archaeologia Aeliana, 1-16
- Charlesworth, Dorothy (1971). "A GROUP OF VESSELS FROM THE COMMANDANT'S HOUSE, HOUSESTEADS". Journal of Glass Studies. 13: 34–37.
- Charlesworth, D (1975). "The commandant's house, Housesteads". Archaeologia Aeliana.
- Charlesworth, D (1978). "Roman Carlisle". Archaeological Journal. 135
- Charlesworth, Dorothy. (1979) 'Notice of book: BRITISH MUSEUM. Masterpieces of glass. By D. B. Harden and others,' in The Journal of Hellenic Studies, Vol. 89 (1969), pp. 191–192. https://www.jstor.org/stable/627535
- Charlesworth, Dorothy; Thornton, J. H. (1973). 'Leather Found in Mediobogdum, the Roman Fort of Hardknott. Britannia. 4: 141–152. doi:10.2307/525862. JSTOR 525862
- Erim, K.T.; Reynolds, Joyce; White, K.D.; Charlesworth, Dorothy. 1973, 'The Aphrodisias Copy of Diocletian's Edict on Maximum Prices,' in JRS' doi:10.2307/299169. JSTOR 299169
