= Yehia Dessouki =

Egyptian artist

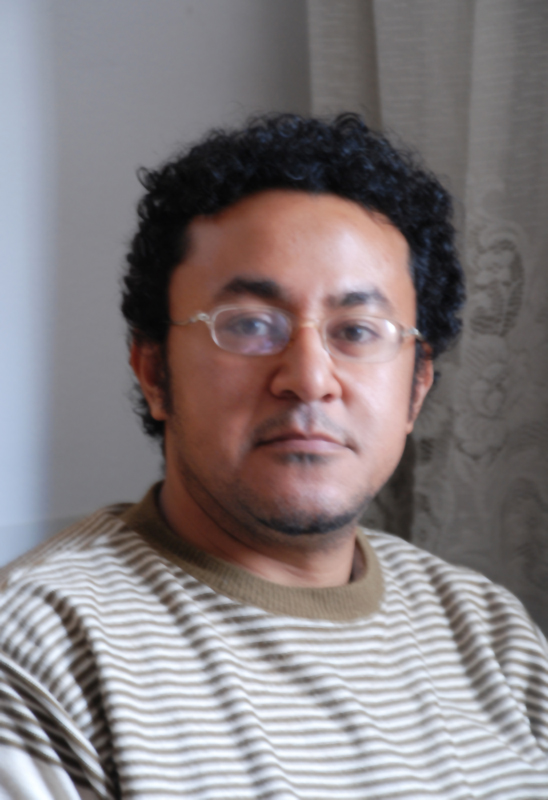
- Born: 13 March 1978 (age 48); Cairo, Egypt
- Known for: Painting

Yehia Dessouki (Arabic: يحيى دسوقى; born 13 March 1978) is an Egyptian painter and visual artist making contemporary art using diverse kinds of media both traditional and digital. He is also an architect, who graduated from the faculty of fine-arts, architecture department, of Helwan University.

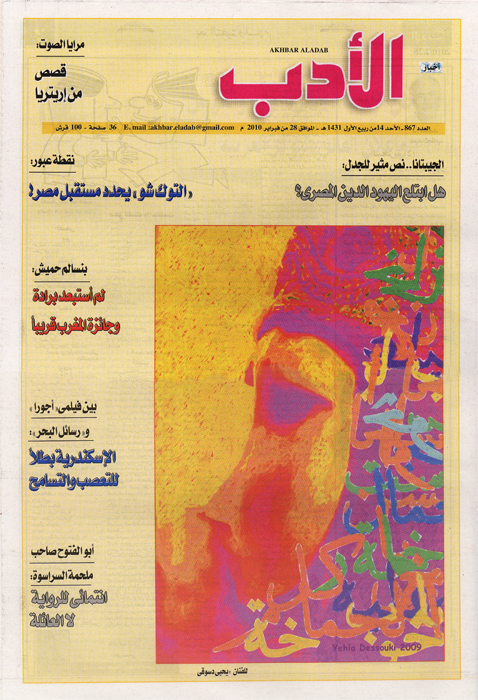
Digital painting of artist Yehia Dessouki on cover of newspaper Akhbar Al-Adab
