= Desuqiyya =

Desouki, also known as the Burhani order, is a Sufi order primarily found in Desouk in Egypt. It was founded by Ibrahim El-Desouki, whose resting place in the Nile delta is a major place of pilgrimage for Sufi Muslims from all over Egypt. Originally from Egypt, there is a significant population of memberes in Khartoum.

During the Ottoman times, this order, along with the other native Egyptian Sufi order, the Badawiyyah order, had several tekkes in Istanbul. These tekkes, along with all others, were closed when Turkey became a republic.

== See also ==
- Muhammad ibn 'Arafa ad-Desouki (prominent late jurist of the Maliki school).
- Ibrahim El-Desouki
- Desouk
- Dessouki
- Desouk SC
