= Muhammad 'Arafa al-Disuqi =

19th-century Islamic jurist

Muhammad b. Ahmad b. 'Arafa al-Disūqī
- Title: Ad-Desouki

Personal life
- Died: 1 April 1815 CE (1230 AH)
- Era: Ottoman Era
- Main interest(s): Aqida and Fiqh
- Notable work: Hashiyat ad-Desouki 'ala ash-Sharh al-Kabir

Religious life
- Religion: Islam
- Jurisprudence: Sunni Maliki

Muhammad ibn Ahmad ibn 'Arafa al-Disūqī (died April 1815 CE) (AH – 1230 AH ) known as ad-Desouki or ad-Dusuqi was a jurist in the Maliki school from Desouk in Egypt.

== Biography ==
Ad-Desouki was born in Desouk in Northern Egypt. He moved from Desouk to Cairo where he attended lessons at al-Azhar University under a number of its scholars most notably Ad-Dardir, whose expounding of the Mukhtasar of Khalil is one of the most important late works in the Maliki school. His most important contribution to Maliki fiqh is his Hashiya (marginal notes on Dardir's expounding of Khalil's Mukhtasar), which is one of the most commonly referenced works for the fatwa positions of the Maliki school. Ad-Desouki was well known and favoured for his ability to simplify complex matters in his teaching style at al-Azhar as well as in his writings. Hasan al-Attar was one of his most famous students who would later become the Grand Imam of al-Azhar. He died in Cairo in 1815 CE.

== See also ==
- List of Islamic scholars
