= Ibrahim al-Desuqi =

Egyptian founder of Desouki Sufi Order (1255–1296)

Sidi Ibrahim al-Desouki
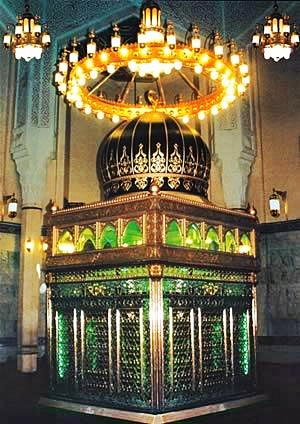
- Mausoleum of Saint Ibrahim El Desouki
- Title: Shaykh al-Islam

Personal life
- Born: 633 AH, (1255 CE) Desouk, Egypt
- Died: 676 AH, (1296 CE) Desouk, Egypt
- Era: Islamic Golden Age, (Later Abbasid Era)
- Main interest: Sufism
- Occupation: Imam

Religious life
- Religion: Islam
- Denomination: Sunni
- School: Shafi'i
- Tariqa: Desouki (founder)
- Creed: Ash'ari

Muslim leader
- Influenced by: Al-Shafi'i

'Ibrahīm Bin ʿAbd-El-ʿAzīz 'Abu al-Magd (Egyptian Arabic: إبراهيم بن عبد العزيز أبو المجد), better known as El Desouki (الدسوقي) (1255 in Desouk, Egypt – 1296), was an Egyptian Imam and the founder of the Desouki Order.

== Life ==
El Desouki was born in Desouk on the Nile Delta and lived there his whole life, hence his attribution to it. According to traditions and popular sayings, he is a descendant of Ali ibn Abi Talib from his paternal side through Ali al-Hadi. El Desouki was influenced by the Shadhili Sufi order founded by his uncle Abu al-Hasan Shadhili and was as well close to his contemporary Sufi Ahmad al-Badawi of Tanta. He became Sheikh ul-Islam of Egypt during Baibars' rule.

His feast is celebrated twice a year: the first during April, and the second on October the 2nd.

== See also ==
- List of Sufis
- Ibrahim El Desouki Mosque
- Desouk
- Desouki
