= Desouk =

Desouk دسوق
- City
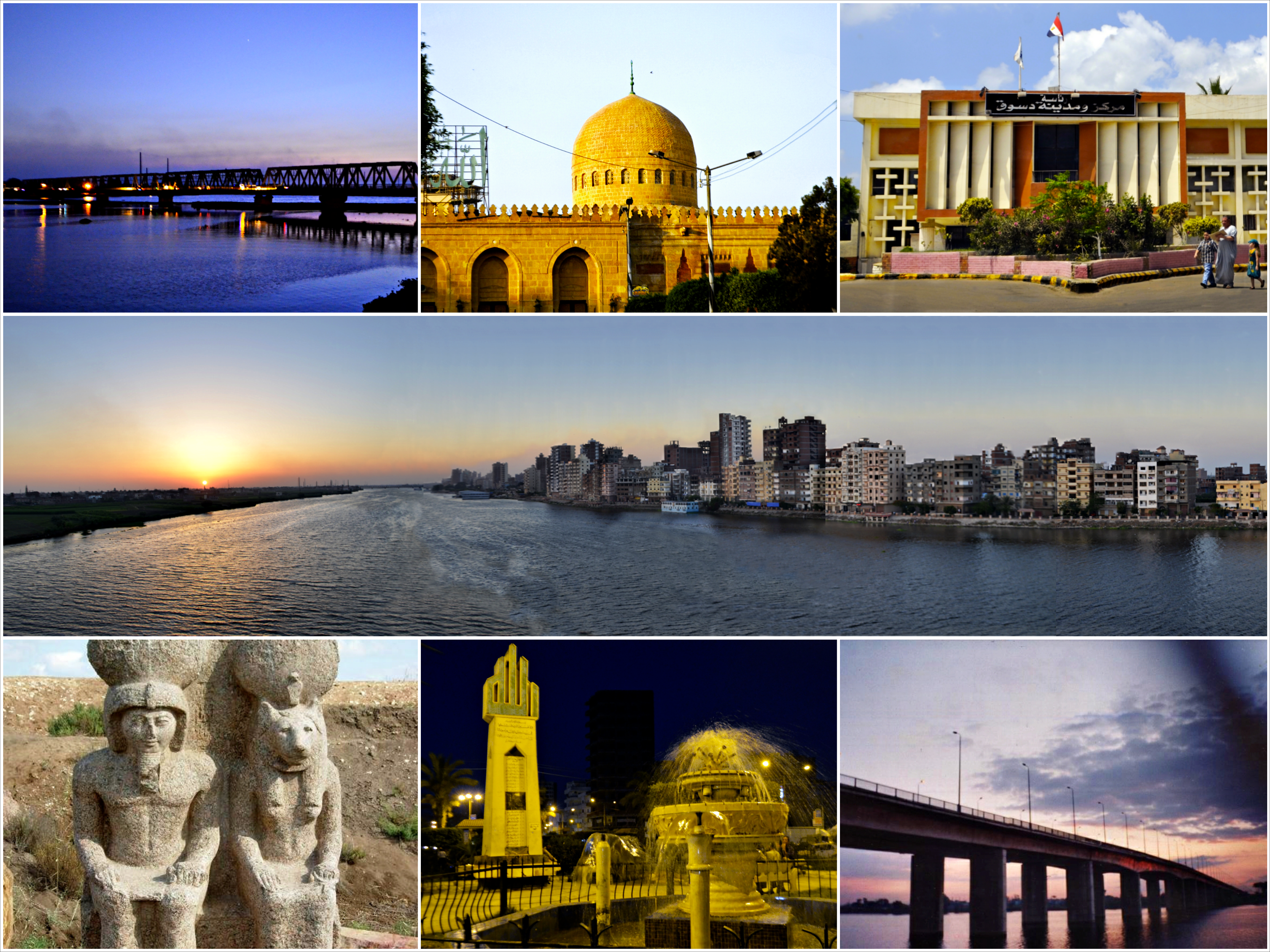
- Clockwise, from top: Desouk Bridge, Ibrahim El Desouki Mosque, City Hall, Nile in Desouk, a statue of Ramesses II with Goddess Sekhmet, Desouk War Memorial, New Desouk Bridge.

- Map of Desouk

- Location in Egypt
- Coordinates: 31°8′32″N 30°38′42″E
- Country: Egypt
- Governorate: Kafr El Sheikh

Area
  - City: 8.635 km^{2} (3.334 sq mi)
  - Metro: 315.235 km^{2} (121.713 sq mi)
- Elevation: 0 m (0 ft)

Population (2023)
  - City: 152,077
  - Density: 17,610/km^{2} (45,610/sq mi)
  - Metro: 604,666
  - Metro density: 1,918.14/km^{2} (4,967.97/sq mi)
- Time zone: UTC+2 (EET)
  - Summer (DST): UTC+3 (EEST)
- ZIP code: 33611 – 33612
- Area code: +2 047

Desouk (Egyptian Arabic: دسوق, Egyptian Arabic pronunciation: [dɪˈsuːʔ]) is a city in northern Egypt. Located 80 km east of Alexandria, in the Kafr El Sheikh Governorate, the city had a population of 137,660 inhabitants as of 2011. It is bordered to the west by the Beheira Governorate.

Desouk dates back to at least c. 3200 BC and was part of the ancient city of Buto before the unification of Upper and Lower Egypt. From 1250 to 1517, the city of Desouk was part of the Gharbia province. From 1798 to 1801, it was part of the now-defunct Rosetta province.

== Etymology ==
The city's name could be derived from Ancient Egyptian: tꜣ-sbk, lit. 'land of Sobek', attested on a statuette from Sais dating to the Third Intermediate Period, through Coptic: *ⲧⲉⲥⲟⲩⲭⲓ, or from Ancient Egyptian: tꜣ-ı͗ꜣ.t-sbk, attested in Greek as Thasoukhios (Ancient Greek: Θασουχιος) and Tasoukis (Ancient Greek: Τασουκις). The cult of Sobek had presence to the west of Disuq, on the other side of the Nile.

Other proposal derives it from the rare Arabic verb dasaqa "to overflow (about a basin)" and its nominal form daysaq "bassin full of water" which in turn has its origin in Ancient Greek: δίσκος, lit. 'disk, salver', but it is considered implausible. Another improbable etymology is a Copto-Arabic word combining the Coptic feminine definite article ti- (Coptic: ϯ-) with Arabic: سوق, romanized: suq, lit. 'market'.

== Overview ==
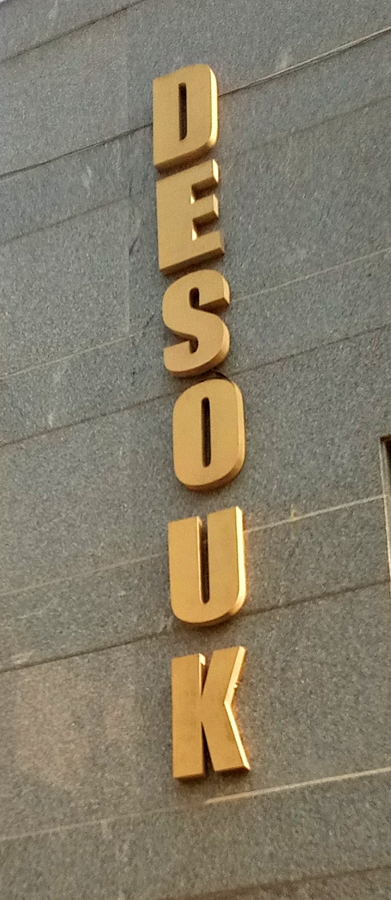
"Desouk"

Desouk is a member of the Organization of Islamic Capitals and Cities due to the location of important Islamic shrines in the city, such as the tomb of Egyptian Sufi Saint Ibrahim El Desouki, which is located in the main mosque in the center of Desouk.

Desouk lies on the Nile, on the eastern banks of the Rosetta branch, where there are only two bridges entering the city.

Many important Egyptians hail from Desouk: Youssef El-Mansy, Ahmed Zewail, Mohammed Roshdy, Evelyn Ashamallah, and Abdel-Salam Mohammed Nasar, a politician in the city.

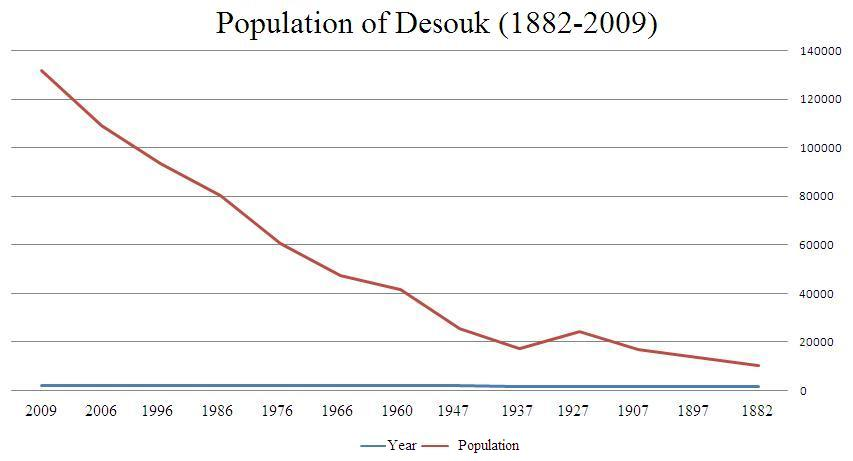
Population of Desouk City (1882-2009).

== Climate ==
Köppen-Geiger climate classification system classifies its climate as hot desert (BWh), the same as the rest of Egypt.

Climate data for Desouk
Month	Jan	Feb	Mar	Apr	May	Jun	Jul	Aug	Sep	Oct	Nov	Dec	Year
Mean daily maximum °C (°F)	17.8 (64.0)	18.8 (65.8)	21.5 (70.7)	25.3 (77.5)	29.2 (84.6)	30.9 (87.6)	32.2 (90.0)	32.3 (90.1)	30.6 (87.1)	28.8 (83.8)	24.6 (76.3)	19.9 (67.8)	26.0 (78.8)
Daily mean °C (°F)	12.4 (54.3)	13.1 (55.6)	15.4 (59.7)	18.6 (65.5)	22.3 (72.1)	24.6 (76.3)	26.1 (79.0)	26.2 (79.2)	24.7 (76.5)	22.8 (73.0)	19.1 (66.4)	14.5 (58.1)	20.0 (68.0)
Mean daily minimum °C (°F)	7 (45)	7.4 (45.3)	9.3 (48.7)	11.9 (53.4)	15.4 (59.7)	18.4 (65.1)	20.1 (68.2)	20.2 (68.4)	18.8 (65.8)	16.8 (62.2)	13.6 (56.5)	9.1 (48.4)	14.0 (57.2)
Average precipitation mm (inches)	26 (1.0)	20 (0.8)	9 (0.4)	4 (0.2)	3 (0.1)	0 (0)	0 (0)	0 (0)	0 (0)	6 (0.2)	13 (0.5)	23 (0.9)	104 (4.1)
Source: Climate-Data.org

== Tourism ==
Desouk is renowned for the presence of Ibrahim El Desouki Mosque, which attracts over a million visitors annually on average. The mosque is the final resting place of the last Sufi pole, Imam Ibrahim El Desouki, established around the year 1277. It currently covers an area of 6400 square meters, and the Ladies' Mosque occupies 600 square meters, making it one of the largest mosques in the Islamic world in terms of area. It houses a university Islamic library as well. In Desouk, an annual celebration is held for the birth of Ibrahim El-Desouki in October, lasting a week with strict security measures. The celebration honors the memory of 77 Sufi orders from various parts of the world. During this time, the city attracts more than a million visitors from various provinces of Egypt and some countries worldwide, making it one of the largest religious celebrations in Egypt. Among the festivities, the custodian of the Ibrahim El-Desouki shrine rides a horse and is paraded through the streets of Desouk after the afternoon prayer on the final day of the celebration. Additionally, an annual celebration of Ragabiya is held in late April or early May of each year, lasting for a week as well.

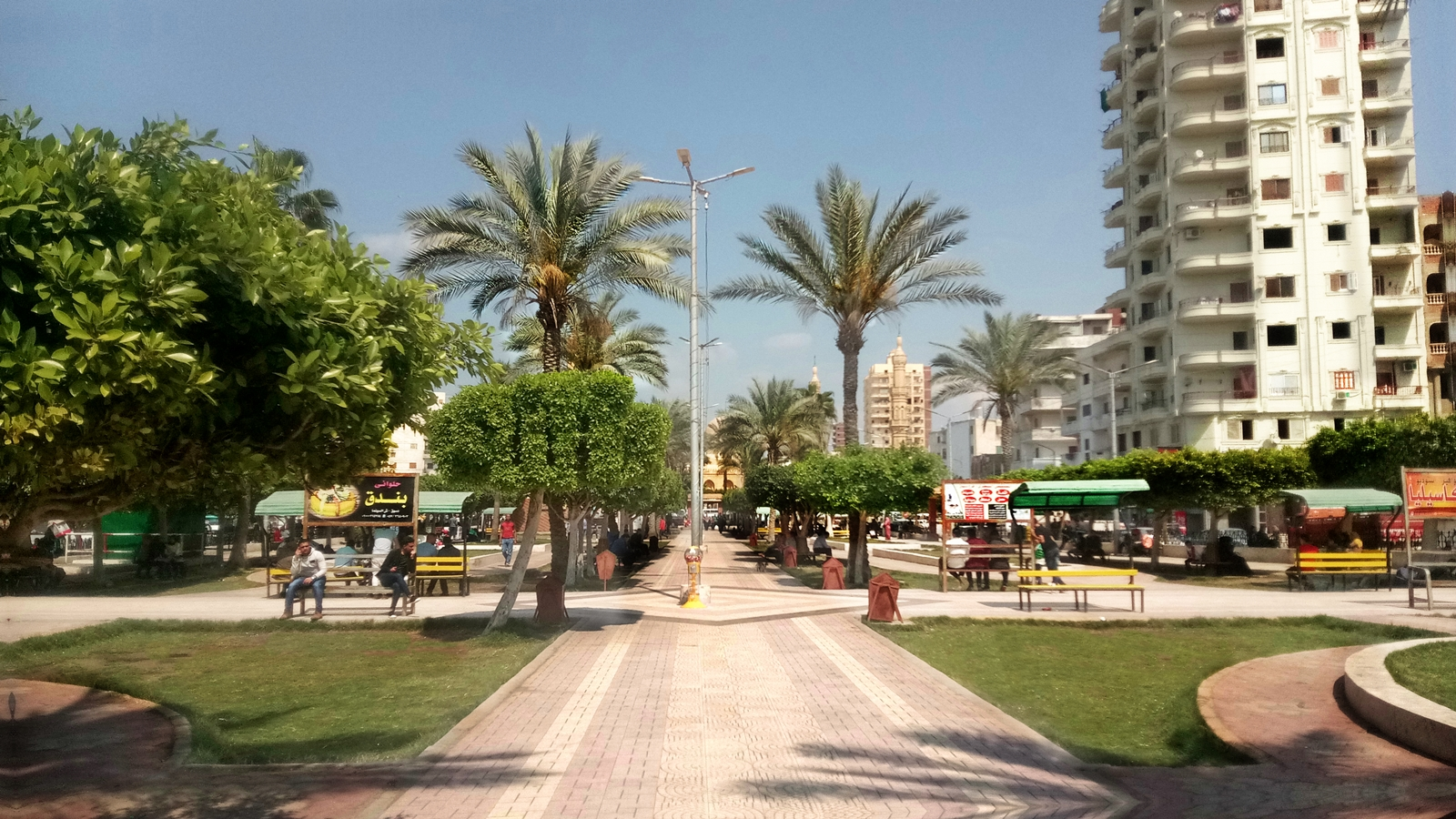
Ibrahimi Square gardens

There are numerous Pharaonic artifacts in the ancient city of Buto, which served as the political capital of the Lower Egypt. Its construction dates back to the Predynastic period, and it is located northeast of Desouk, about 12 km away. Buto was a significant religious center where every king or prince, upon ascending to rule, was required to go to Buto to legitimize their rule by the priests. This was done for worship and to draw closer to the goddess Wadjet, the Lady of the City, a central figure in the Egyptian myth of Isis and Osiris.

The area is characterized by several artifacts, some dating back to the Predynastic period, such as the Wadjet Temple, Horus Statue, and the double statue of the goddess Sekhmet and King Ramesses II, among many other artifacts. Locally, the region is known as "Tall Al-Fara'in," named after the founding pharaohs. It spans an area of 175 acres (0.7 km²).

== Notable people ==
- Ibrahim al-Desuqi
- Ahmed Zewail (born 1946), Egyptian chemist, first Egyptian and Arab to be awarded with Nobel in a scientific field
- Mohsen Hendawy (born 1981), Egyptian football player
- Omar Assar (born 1991), Egyptian table tennis player

== See also ==
- List of cities and towns in Egypt
- Buto
- Desouk SC
- Desouk Stadium
- Desouki
- Desouk Bridge
