= Disability rights in Israel =

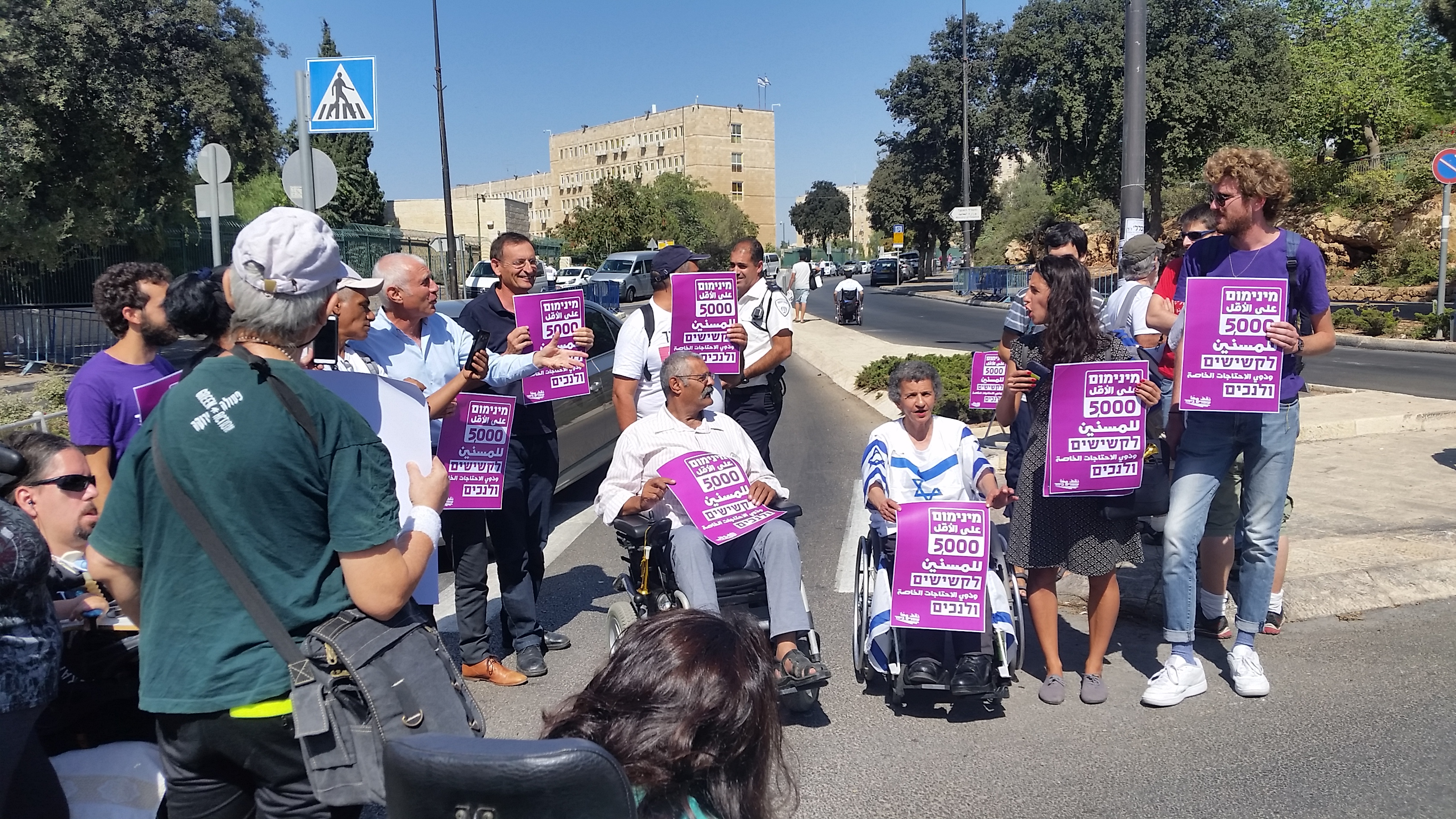
Demonstration and blocking of the road near the Knesset building with Member of Knesset Dov Khenin, Jerusalem, September 2017.

Disability rights in Israel are based among the rest upon disability pensions, accessibility regulations, therapy, special education, sheltered workshop and assisted living.

Since the beginning of the 21st century, the disabled people in Israel, with a population of 250,000, have managed to equalize the disability pension from the Bituah Leumi (National Insurance Institute of Israel) to the minimum wage level in Israel. As of 2017, the struggle was made by demonstrations, blocking main roads, highways and industries, activity in social networking services, petitions to the High Court of Justice, negotiations with the Government of Israel and bills in the Knesset.

In 2017, a full disability pension was 2,342 ILS. The minimum wage in this year was 5,000 ILS, and in December 2017 it went up to 5,300 ILS per month.

== Background ==
The General Disability Pension was linked to the national average salary in Israel, as it was determined in the National Insurance Law [combined version], 1995, but in an amendment from 2003, it was determined in article 110 of the Law, that the pension will be linked to the Consumer Price Index.

In January 2000, the minimum wage was 2,797.75 ILS, and the disability pension in Israel was 2,239 ILS, 80 percent of the minimum wage. However, even in 2000 the disabled people demanded to equalize their pension to the minimum wage.

Most of the disabled Israelis who are entitled to a full disability pension and are permanently dependent on it for work incapacity, do not receive any other allowance. Those who receive an additional special allowance, receive it for special needs such as nursing or mobility, and it does not cover the costs to which it is intended. In addition, the designated allowances are not for basic subsistence needs.

The disability pension in Israel was one of the lowest in the OECD countries: In 2007, Israel was ranked 26th out of 31 countries. An examination conducted by OECD in 2007 also found that the disability benefit per capita in Israel was approximately 80 percent lower than the average allowance per capita in the OECD countries. In 2004, Israel raised the threshold of the sole Medical Disability from 40 percent to 60 percent, as the eligibility for Disability pension. On 10 June 2018, the National Insurance Institute advertised an extensive research which found that the allowances in Israel were one of the lowest in the Western world, and wrote: "Israel's Social Security System is characterized by a very low level of generosity".

=== Legislative initiatives ===
On 7 December 2016, the Knesset approved in a preliminary reading, by a majority of 42 to 39, a law proposal, which had been submitted by MK Ilan Gilon to equalize the basic disability pension to the minimum wage. Some months earlier, MK Nava Boker also submitted on 28 February 2016, a bill to link the disability pension to the minimum wage. The difference between her bill and Gilon's bill was that by Boker's bill, payments to disabled people from private insurances would be reduced from the disability allowance. Boker's bill which received 82 signatures of Knesset members, was transferred to the Ministerial Committee on Legislation, but was postponed several times.

=== The Zelekha Committee ===
Following the discussion in the Ministerial Committee on Legislation, in mid-February 2017 the Minister of Finance Moshe Kahlon appointed Professor Yaron Zelekha, in cooperation with the "Necheh, Lo Hetzi Ben Adam" (Disabled, Not Half a Human Being) Association led by Alex Fridman, to the head of a special commission to examine raising disability payments. In May 2017, Zelekha recommended an increase in the disability pension to 4,000 ILS per month in three stages, linkage of the pension to the Consumer Price Index plus one percent, raising the disregard (the amount which is allowed to earn) to the Minimum Wage level, equalizing payment of a nursing worker to the minimum wage, pension under a work disability and not only a physical disability, increasing pension of elderly disabled, and broadening the range of the mobility allowance.

=== The Simhon Committee ===
In May 2017 the Prime Minister of Israel Benjamin Netanyahu appointed Professor Avi Simhon, chairman of the National Economic Council in the Prime Minister's Office, as a chairman of another committee with representatives from the Ministry of Finance, Ministry of Social Affairs and Social Services, Ministry of Health and the National Insurance Institute. The commission's recommendations were submitted after about a month. The allowance for a disabled person under this scheme would be 3,200 ILS and would be given to people with disabilities at the rate of 75% or more who were defined as poor, while the disregard of a salary would be decreased from 5,300 ILS (the minimum wage) to 4,200 ILS.

On 22 June 2017, MK David Bitan, Coalition chairman, convened a News conference and said that he rejected the recommendation of Simhon Committee to 3,200 ILS, and agreed with the Opposition to accept 4,000 ILS recommended by Zelekha Committee.

With the establishment of the Simhon Committee, the disabled people reacted by repeated blockings of major roads in Israel such as the entrance to Ben Gurion International Airport from Highway 1, the Ayalon Highway, Highway 4, Ra'anana Junction, the Coastal Road and the entrance to Jerusalem, near the Chords Bridge.

The demonstrators claimed that for decades they had demonstrated in front of the Knesset, the Ministry of Finance and the roads, but the government and the public ignored their demands. Therefore, they had to turn to roadblocks. Initially, the Israel Police did not take proactive enforcement action against roadblocks, but with increasing traffic disturbances, The police began to take a more severe hand, and some of the obstructions included clashes between the police and disabled people. As a result, several disabled people were arrested. In September 2017, the police issued a statement saying that it would no longer allow roadblocks in demonstrations, and that it would begin to fine the demonstrators who blocked roads. The police added that it "will continue to allow freedom of expression and protest by law, but will not allow a public order to be violated and such a significant violation of the normal fabric of life of Israeli citizens".

A week before the submission of the conclusions of the Simhon Committee, disabled representatives appealed to the High Court following the postponement of allowances increasing. In its response to the petition, the state claimed that the petitioners did not prove that the disability allowance of 2,342 ILS a month would not allow the right to live with dignity. On 18 June 2018, the chief justice Esther Hayut cancelled the petition in the High Court. She adjudicated that the disability pension has already been raised by legislation in February 2018, and the petition should be corrected due to this raise.

On 4 September 2017, the Disabled people demonstrated outside the Histadrut offices in Tel Aviv. On 5 September 2017, the Histadrut chairman Avi Nissenkorn met with the Disabled people's organizations, and told them that the Histadrut would be a full partner in their struggle.

On 18 September 2017, there was a special plenum session in the Knesset, due to the delay in legislation, which resulted a submission of tens of MKs signatures to Yuli Edelstein, the Speaker of the Knesset. The subject of the session was the government's maltreatment in the disabled people. Some MKs, as the former Minister of Finance Yair Lapid, attacked the government. The session ended with a vote of 49 votes, with no opposition, to pass the issue to one of the Knesset committees.

=== Negotiation in the Histadrut ===
Toward the end of September 2017, Naomi Moravia, chairwoman of the "Israeli Human Rights Organization of People with Disabilities", which was located in the Histadrut building in Tel Aviv, asked for Nissenkorn assistance in opposition to the government. Following her request, Nissenkorn convened on the night of 29 September 2017, a night meeting at the Histadrut of representatives of disabled people with him, with MK Ilan Gilon and MK David Bitan, and with Avi Simhon. After 12 hours of negotiations until the morning hours, during which Yehuda Doron, a representative of the Polio Handicapped Association, retired from the discussion, and Dr. Amichai Tamir of the Disabled Organization remained in the discussion, but opposed the outline, it was agreed to supplement the disability pension in four stages until 2021, so that the final allowance would be 3,800 up to 4,000 ILS for disabled people and 4,050 ILS for 30 thousand individuals with above 80% disability. The sum of the disregard would be raised in two stages to 4,000 ILS in January 2018 and to 4,300 ILS in January 2019. The budgetary cost of the outline was 4.2 billion ILS, and it was agreed that the addition of 340 to 540 ILS for Disabled people, would start in January 2018. On 1 October 2017, Simhon claimed that the government could only commit to an addition of 1.3 billion ILS for 2018, and would not commit itself to the coming years. Simhon explained that a computer program (a software agent) which was called Numerator, limited the government's commitment without an appropriate budget clause, and therefore the inability to commit to 4.2 billion ILS.

== Responses of disability organizations ==
Simhon's remarks about the inability to commit to 4.2 billion ILS, along with the expected addition in January 2018 of 340 ILS to disabled people and the four stages up to 2021, caused most disabled people to deny the outline which had been reached between the organizations "Israeli Human Rights Organization of People with Disabilities" and "Necheh Lo Hetzi Ben Adam" and the Government, with the assistance of Nissenkorn.

The organizations "The Disabled Panthers" led by Eyal Cohen, "The A-team Disabled" under the leadership of Ofer Sofer, the organization of disabled people, led by Tamir, and the Polio organization led by Doron, announced that they would continue to block roads until the disability pension would be equal to the minimum wage and would be paid with one stage.

Oren Helman, a Vice President of the Israel Electric Corporation, a father of a daughter with a disability, and a former advisor to Netanyahu for a year when Netanyahu was the Finance Minister, also published an article in the newspaper Globes after advertising the Histadrut outline, and demanded to increase the amount of the disregard to 15,000 ILS.

=== Intensification of protests ===
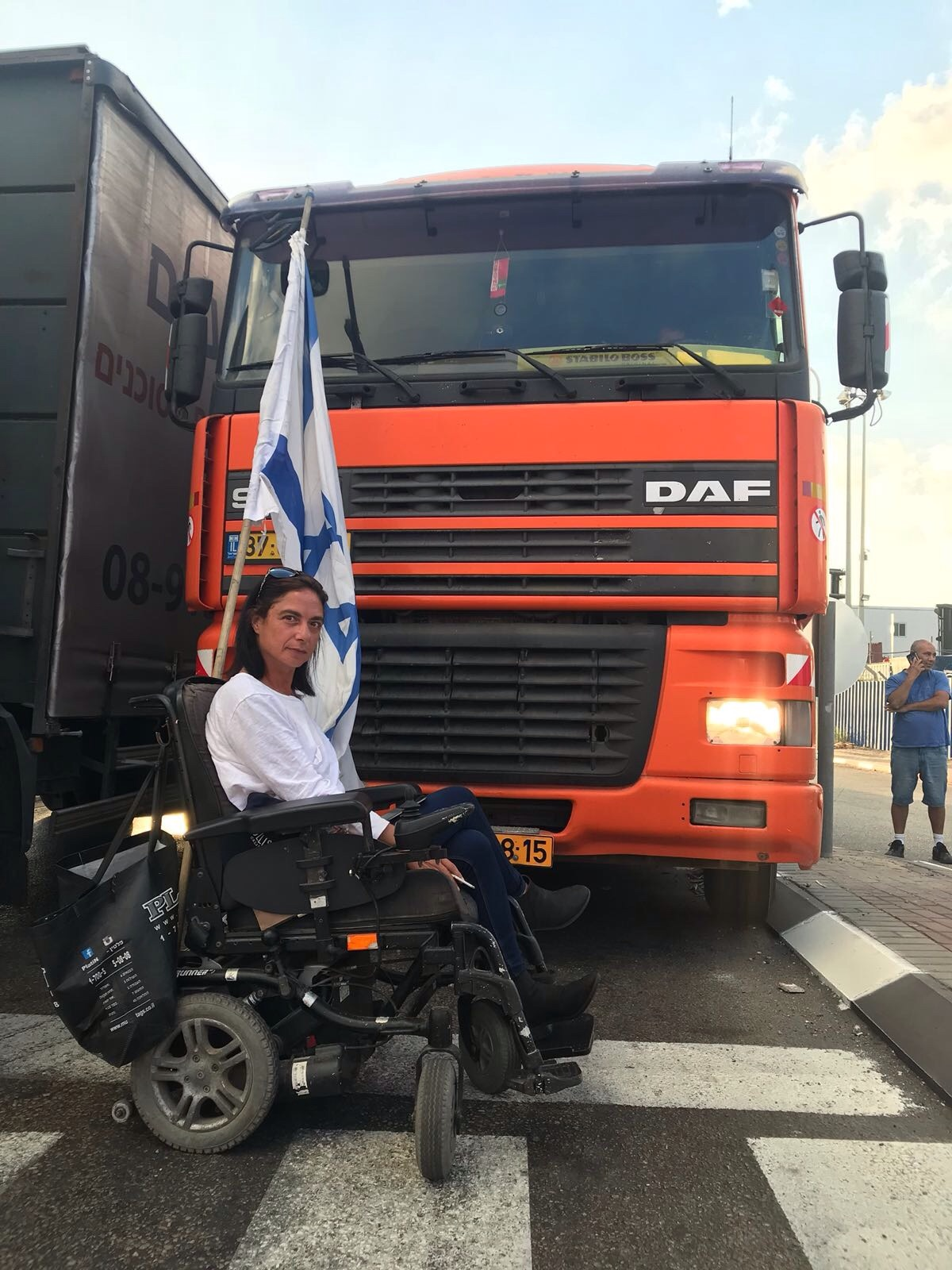
Hanna Akiva is blocking the entrance to Port of Ashdod, 3 October 2017.

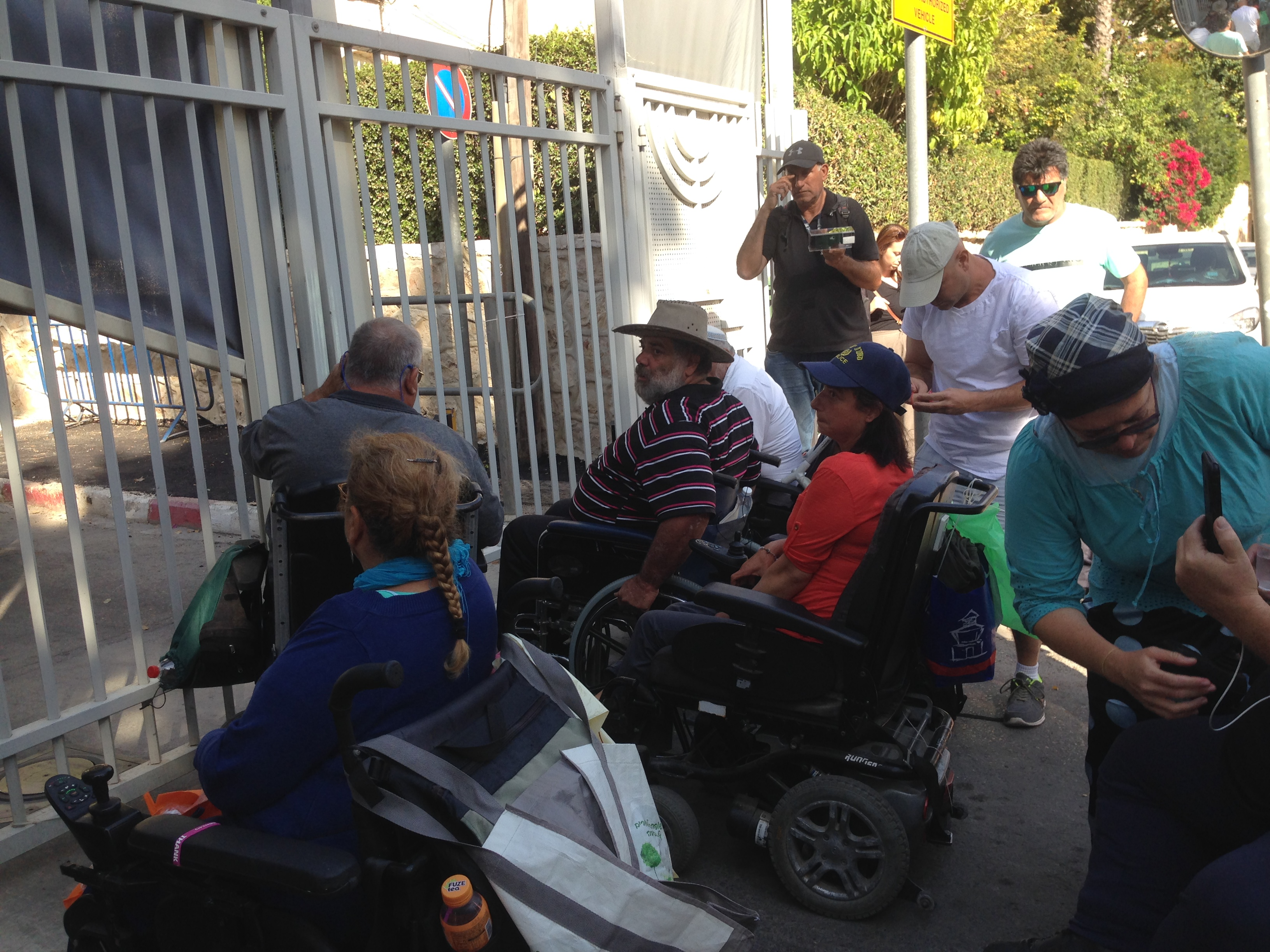
The demonstration of the disabled in front of the prime minister's residence on 17 October 2017, with Eyal Cohen, Hanna Akiva (in red), Iris Haya Zigdon (in blue) and Raanan Kerklies, who passed away on 23 May 2018, in a gray shirt with his back to the camera. Balfour Street, Jerusalem.

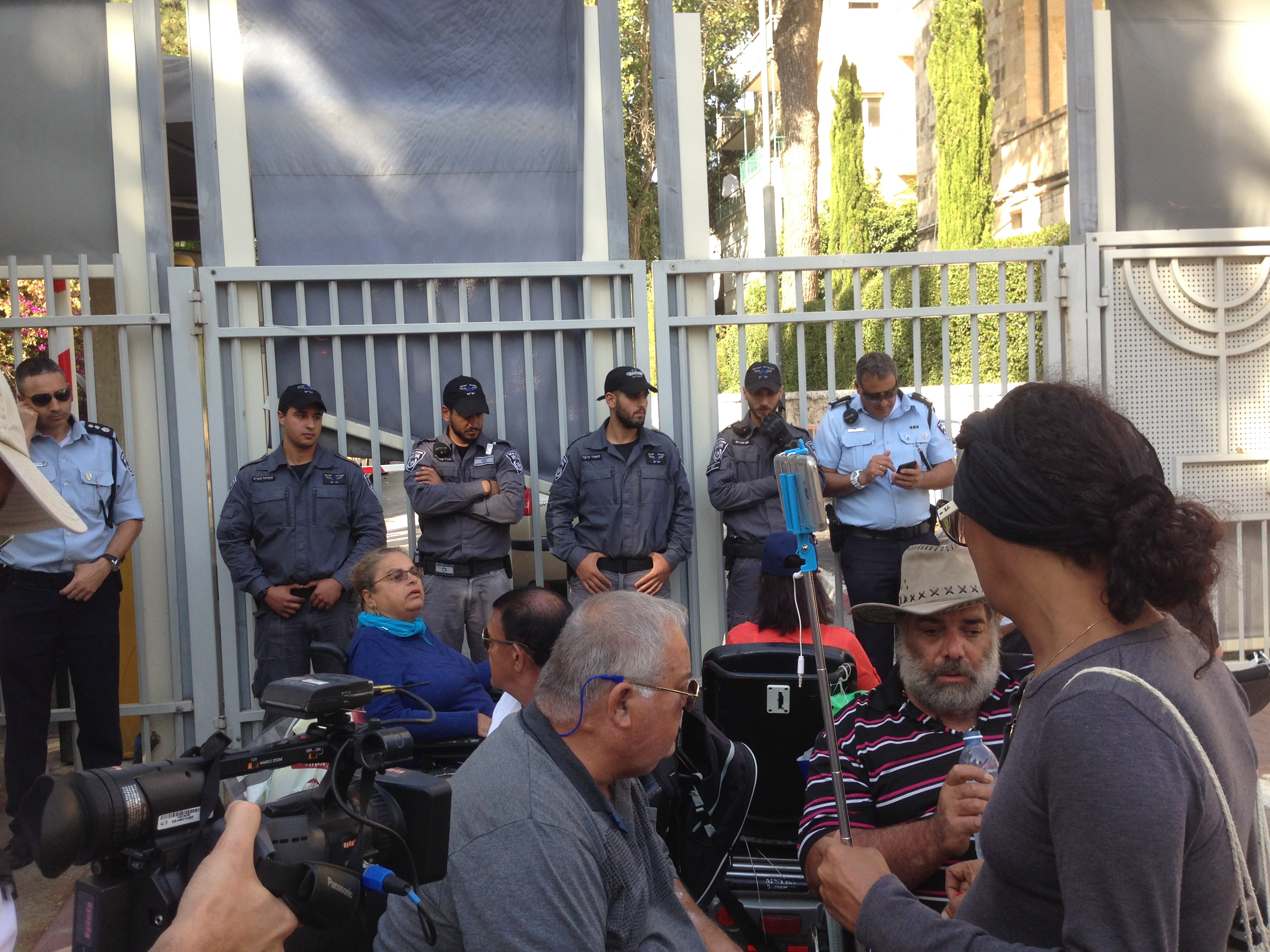
Police Yasam team in front of the disabled people at the prime minister's residence. Facing the camera – Eyal Cohen, the leader of "The Disabled Panthers", Kerklies was left to him, and behind him – Yehuda Doron (in white) and Zigdon. Shachaf Mahfood, a "Disabled Panthers" activist, held a handheld extendable pole, recording the demonstration by her smartphone's camera. Balfour Street, Jerusalem, 17 October 2017.

On 3 October 2017, the members of "The Disabled Panthers" and "The A-team" blocked two entrances to the Port of Ashdod from six in the morning for five hours, causing heavy financial damage. The demonstrators agreed to evacuate the entrances to the port after the police agreed to void the traffic tickets which it recorded on their vehicles. On 9 October 2017, during the Sukkot holiday, representatives of disabled people were hosted by the President Reuven Rivlin at the president's succah (tabernacle), which was opened to the general public. The president asked disabled people to hold a dignified dialogue with all the professional bodies. Then disabled people went and demonstrated outside the house of the Interior Minister Aryeh Deri in the rain. From Deri, they went to the Prime Minister's residence on Balfour street, and blocked Gaza Street. From there they moved to France Square, and blocked the traffic. On 15 October, for the first time in cooperation with representatives of disabled IDF veterans, disabled people disrupted the southern traffic on the Coastal Road near Netanya by driving slowly on the road, with the approval and in coordination with the police.

On 17 October 2017, disabled people gathered at a gas station near the Latrun Interchange, and from there they drove slowly on Highway 1 to Jerusalem, causing heavy traffic. They arrived at the Prime Minister's house and blocked the southern entrance gate on Balfour Street. Nicole Raidman arrived and caused a media storm when she gave 2,000 ILS to Hanna Akiva from "The Disabled Panthers". Then the Panthers' spokesman clarified that the money was transferred to cover their expenses, and was not used personally. After blocking the Prime Minister's residence, they blocked Keren Hayesod Street in Jerusalem, blocked Paris Square, and from there they went to the Chords Bridge and blocked the entrance to Jerusalem until evening, under the supervision of the police.

With the return of the Knesset to the Winter Session on 23 October 2017, disabled people from 15 organizations set up a tent opposite the Knesset, and clashed with its security guards in an attempt to break into the territory of the Knesset. The police closed Kaplan Street to traffic. When Naomi Moravia left the Knesset, disabled people burst out, shouting at her, and security guards accompanied her out. Disabled people also blocked the entrances to the Ministry of Finance.

On 5 November 2017, members of "the Disabled Panthers" blocked the entrances and exits at the Haifa Oil Refineries for four and a half hours. The security personnel of the Refineries went out to the protestors with refreshments.

On 19 November 2017, the Disabled people blocked the entrances and exits of the Prime Minister's Office in Jerusalem, when the weekly cabinet meeting was held there, and then blocked the Light rail traffic in Jerusalem.

On 22 November 2017, at seven o'clock in the morning, "the Disabled Panthers" blocked the exits from Bitan's home in Rishon LeZion, in a similar manner to the four beats designed for disabled people. Some residents of the street tried to confront them, and the police forces in the area prevented it. From there, they went to Ben Gurion Airport and blocked the railway. On 29 November 2017, they returned to Bitan's place at 5:40 in the morning, when it was still dark, and met Bitan on his way to his car, because Bitan's driver could not reach him, due to the blocking by the Panthers. Police accompanied Bitan, and the Panthers told Bitan that they would continue to block him and his neighbors until he realized that just a minimum wage would be the pension for all disabled people. Amnon Ben-Ataf followed Bitan, condemned him, told him that he disliked disabled people, and asked how his wife and his daughter could live on 2,400 ILS if they became disabled. Bitan replied to him: "Do not shout in my ear". In response, Moravia sent a bouquet of roses to Bitan, wrote: "We are not them", and signed on behalf of her organization's members.

== Legislation initiated by the government ==
On 25 November 2017, the Welfare Minister of Israel Haim Katz announced a bill on his behalf that would be placed on the Government's table. The "Israeli Human Rights Organization of People with Disabilities" responded to Katz's bill, and rejected the non-linkage to the Average Wage in Israel, the lowering of the total amount from 4.2 billion ILS to less than 2 billion ILS, the absence of further increase of the Disregard in 2019, and the absence of further increase of the disability pension. On 26 November 2017, a memorandum of law was published,[64] which was the formal beginning of a legislative initiative initiated by the government for several changes in the disability pension following the agreement between the disability organizations and the government. On the same day, the disabled people demonstrated against Katz's bill, and blocked the light rail in Jerusalem for an hour.

On 5 December 2017, at a meeting of the Labor, Welfare and Health Committee in the Knesset, which was headed by MK Eli Alaluf on the bill submitted by MK Gilon, a fight broke out between Arik Harari, who opposed the Histadrut's outline, and Ofer Buchnik of the "Israeli Human Rights Organization of People with Disabilities". According to Harari, he responded to the touch of Gabi Hadai from the "Israeli Human Rights Organization" at Simcha Benita, the chairwoman of "Mazor" organization. On 11 December 2017 Another meeting was held in the Labor, Welfare and Health Committee. At this meeting, MK Moti Yogev of the Jewish Home said that it was absolutely necessary that the Disability Pension would not be affected due to going out of Disabled people to work, alongside the obligation to shorten the stages. MK Abd al-Hakim Hajj Yahya of the Joint List said that disability pensions are a commitment of the state towards its citizens, and the budget of 4.2 billion ILS is not something sacred. He said that the MKs had to check with the Treasury if there was over revenue. By Hajj Yahya, if there was money, the stages' number should be reduced. Eyal Cohen from "the Disabled Panthers" said that he had paid to the National Insurance every month without any stages, and his doctor told him a year ago, that he would have four years to live.

On 20 December 2017, the Knesset approved unanimously in a preliminary vote the bill submitted by MK Mickey Rosenthal supported by Welfare Minister Katz, which would increase the allowance to 4,300 ILS in a gradual process. Katz said that a minimum wage for the disabled people probably would not happen. On 21 December 2017, "the Disabled Panthers" arrived at the home of Shai Babad, the Director general of the Finance Ministry, after Katz had said and had denied afterwards, that Babad had asserted that he totally had not cared about the Disabled. From Babad, the Panthers moved to Netanyahu in Caesarea, barricaded themselves in front of the house and pasted stickers of "the Disabled Panthers" on the door of his home, on the front door of his parking lot and on the street illumination.

On 29 December 2017, Boker announced that on Sunday, 31 December 2017, she would submit her bill to the Ministerial Committee on Legislation for the sixth time. According to Boker, the Ministerial Committee approved the bill and attached it to the government bill. On 1 January 2018, Gilon convened Knesset members from the Coalition and from the Opposition to discuss the absence of legislation by the government, even though the legislative deadline passed.

On 3 January 2018, Netanyahu and Katz announced at a News conference that disabled people would receive an additional 161 ILS in July 2018, in addition to the planned 340 ILS. The Disabled responded by blocking Highway 4 and burning tires, blocking the Golf Junction in Caesarea and blocking the Power station in Hadera. On the same day, Boker's bill passed in a preliminary reading in the Knesset by 86 votes without dissent. In an interview with Israel Hayom, Katz admitted that the additions to the disabled pension were insufficient, and a week later, blamed the Treasury for playing game, and said that Netanyahu did not care about disabled people. Fridman announced that the government was breaking the agreement and launched a campaign "We will not agree to half an Agreement".

On 12 September 2018, Katz said in the government meeting that the agreement to transfer the National Insurance surplus to the Treasury is canceled. According to article 7 of the agreement, each party may notify the other party in writing, no later than three months prior to the end of a particular financial year, that from the subsequent fiscal year, it is no longer interested in investments under this agreement. The Ministry of Labor and Social Affairs told the media that the situation in which the money that was supposed to guarantee the future of the allowances and of the National Insurance Institute, served the current state budget – could not continue. In a reaction, MK Itzik Shmuli said that over the years, the Finance Ministry robbed more than 220 billion ILS from the National Insurance Institute funds. Instead of keeping the money to ensure compliance with obligations, it was burned on the political needs of the governments. This reckless and dangerous behavior has led to a catastrophic situation in which the Institute would not be able to provide the elderly, disabled people and the other eligible people in the future, what they deserved by law.

On 24 October 2018, there was a repeated vote in the Knesset on the law proposal of MK Gilon to equalize the disability allowance to the minimum wage. This time the proposal failed by 39 opponents against 37 supporters. MK Oded Forer cursed MKs of the Likud who left the vote, and let him do their job. Neta Ben-Cnaan advertised the exact results.

On 26 November 2018, Kahlon said in the morning show "HaOlam HaBoker" (The world this morning) with Avri Gilad and Maya Ziv Wolf, that the disabled people have never received such a large addition. He said that it was clear that all the organizations of disabled people and the elderly people were satisfied. There is a small group which is not satisfied. Kahlon did not specify the addition which the disabled people got, but said: "They received a big sum".

== Protests against government legislation ==
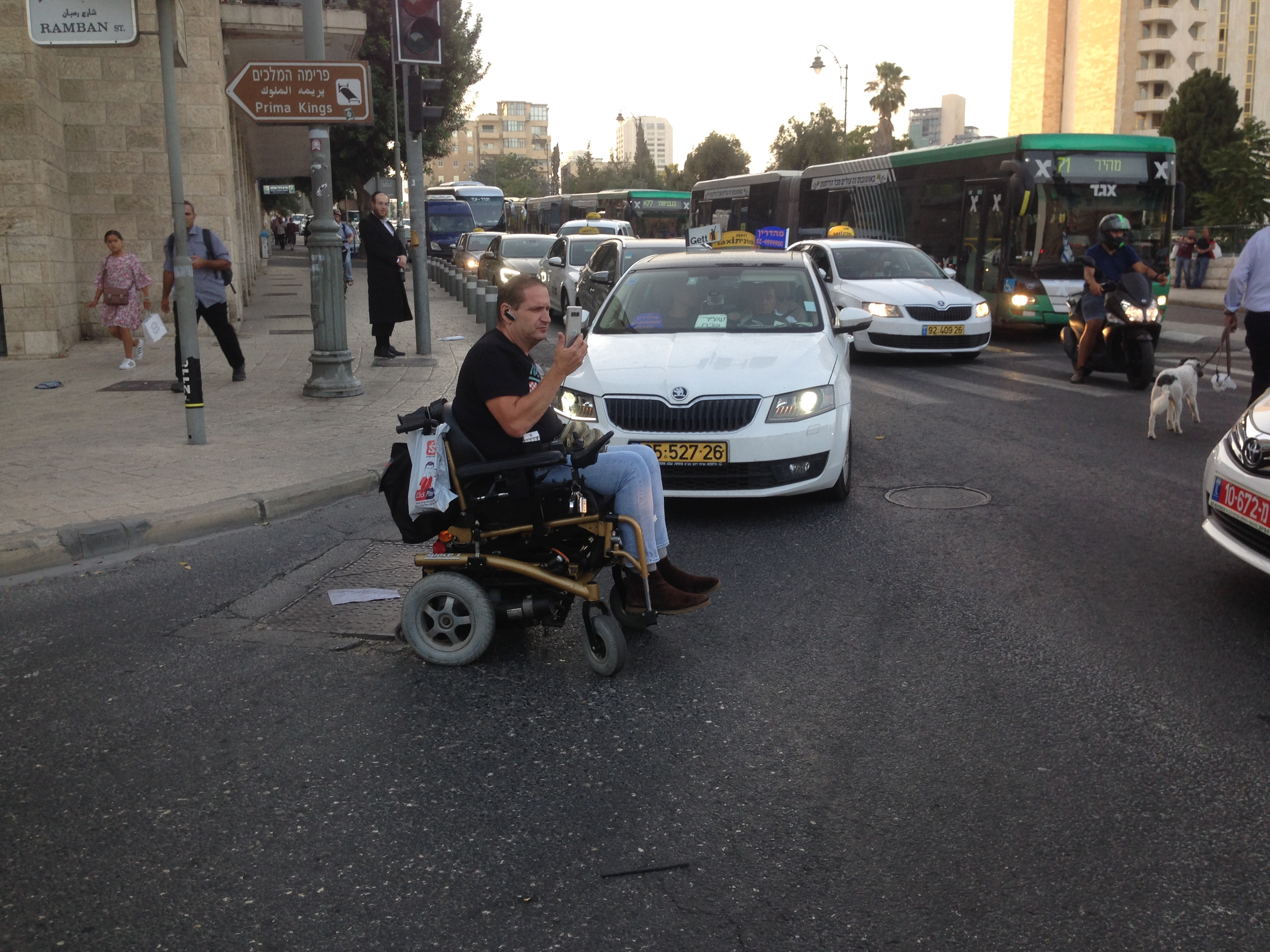
Ofer Sofer blocks Paris Square in Jerusalem during the demonstration for equalizing the disability pension to the minimum wage, not far from the Israel Prime Minister's house, 28 June 2018.

Disabled and elderly people block Paris Square in Jerusalem during their demonstration, 28 June 2018.

Disabled and elderly people block the Yaka square by the Knesset during their demonstration. Jerusalem, 16 July 2018.

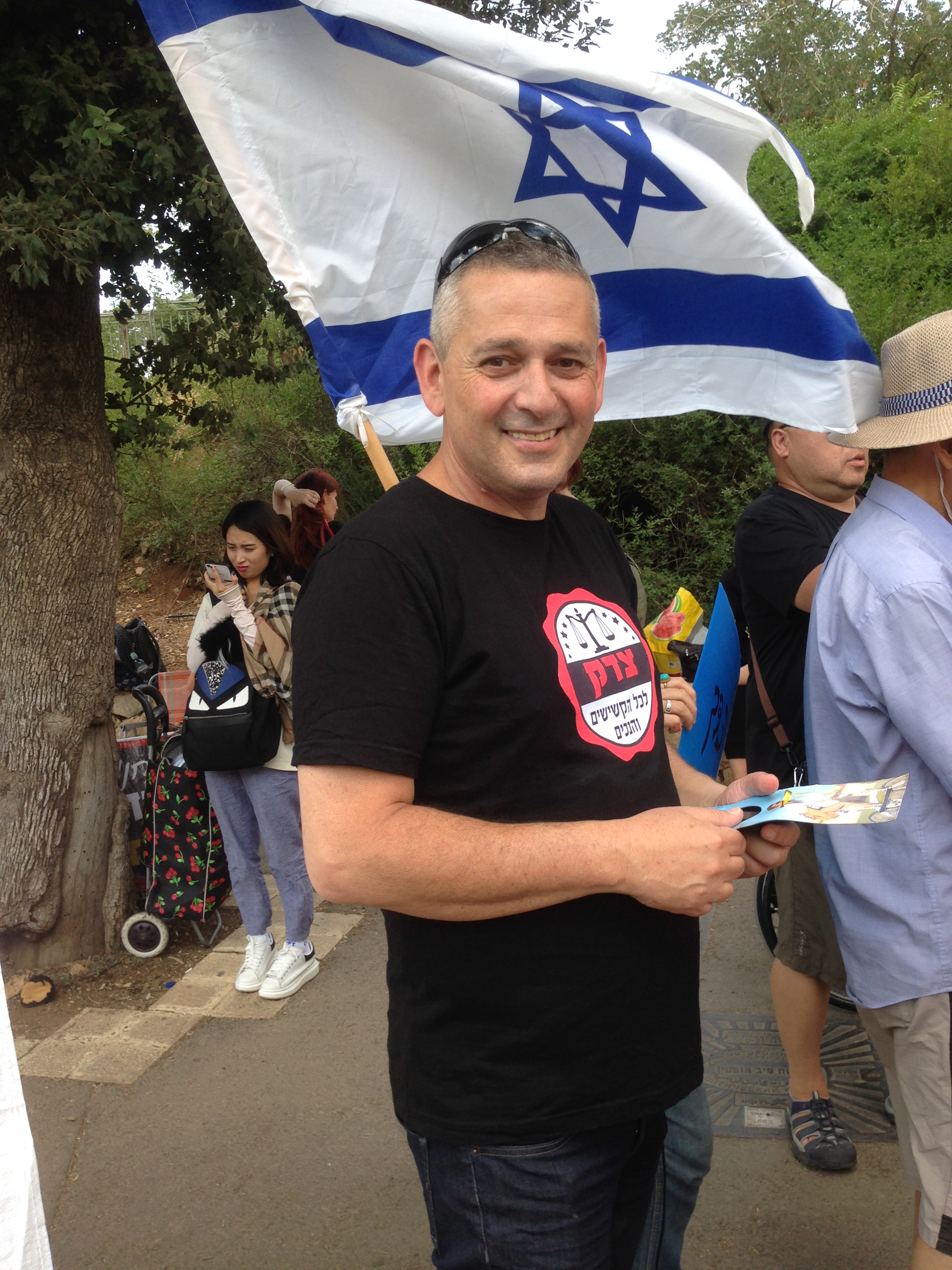
Yonathan Tadmor at the Yaka square. Next to him, three Japanese tourists are recording the demonstration. Jerusalem, 16 July 2018.

On 8 January 2018, Ravit Ben Baruch, a disabled leader, addressed Simhon in her video in Facebook, and told him:

"What did you come to tell me? That as long as you could milk me with exorbitant taxes that have no parallel in any civilized country in the world, the arrangement between us worked great. Moreover, I have never earned a minimum wage, so I paid every month very good taxes, assuming naively that it was okay to cut me like it, because it went to families who needed it, but it has not been done. What can I tell you, each one of you? At the moment you would stop being a milking cow, you would have to expect it. This state would strip you of the last dignity which you still had, and would treat you as a beggar at the doorway. From the moment in which he could not suck my blood any longer, I became a burden. A burden on the state coffers. As such, he is sorry to disappoint me, I am not entitled to a pension. I get a handout and I have to thank nicely and shut up. In the sequence of the disgusting nonsense that came out of your mouth, you were right about one thing. There is no university in the world which could teach you what human compassion is. No, sir. You are just a lost cause. And do you know what? I do not need to get excited by you either. Who are you at all? You are just a pathetic little pawn, a spineless marionette which is pulled by strings. You also are not the addressee."

On 15 August 2018, Ben Baruch joined "Tnufa Le-Dimona" (Momentum for Dimona), a political party in Dimona which was led by Eli Sagron towards the municipal elections in Israel on 30 October 2018. On 3 October 2018, Ben Baruch joined "Kulanu" in Dimona, which was led by Michal Elmalem Abu, and Amichai Tamir reacted to it. When a reader, whose name was Eitan Sharon, asked if Kahlon also studied Business administration for burying the disabled people's rights, Ben Baruch replied that four years of her life were wasted in the university, because she could learn better during half a year from her father, who managed a business. On 30 October 2018, Kulanu received one seat at the municipal elections in Dimona.

On 22 January 2018, the "Israeli Human Rights Organization of People with Disabilities" returned and blocked the entrances to the Israel Aerospace Industries, and the port of Ashdod. The organization announced the government's failure to reach the outline which had been agreed in the Histadrut, and the organization's return, after painful compromises and condemnations by other Disabled, to its original demand: a disability pension of a minimum wage in one stage.

On 12 February 2018, the National Insurance Law was approved by the Labor, Welfare and Health Committee, and the disabled people also participated in the committee. The sums set did not meet the requirements of disabled people, but were accepted lawfully by the Knesset plenum on the night of 12–13 February. In response, The Disabled Panthers barricaded themselves at the Knesset with other disabled people, and after an agreement with the Knesset officer, they voluntarily left the Knesset.

On 17 May 2018, the Disabled Panthers initiated a new project of serving food to disabled people. As a result, Yonathan Tadmor held a demonstration at the Government Compound in Tel Aviv on 31 May 2018, requesting a Minimum Wage for the Disabled and Elderly people. The commander of the Lev Tel Aviv Police station, Commander Shlomi Sagi, pushed Yael Nitzav to Ayalon road.

On 4 June 2018, the Disabled Panthers met with Yehuda Doron at the Clalit Health Services Headquarters in Tel Aviv, after the passing away of the Disabled Panther Raanan Kerklies, which had demonstrated against Clalit, demanding a full refund for an ambulance after a dialysis, which he received four times a week. After the meeting, the Disabled Panthers went down and blocked the head intersection of Arlosorov and Ibn Gabirol streets in Tel Aviv.

On 28 June 2018, there were four demonstrations of the disabled people at the same time. The demonstrations were in Haifa in front of Kahlon's house, led by Yonathan Tadmor; in Tel Aviv on Ayalon Highway, led by Eyal Cohen; in Jerusalem near to the Prime Minister's house, led by Ofer Sofer, and in Beersheba at the plaza near Beersheba District Court, led by Ravit Ben Baruch.

On 16 July 2018, Tadmor led a meeting of disabled and elderly people at the Yaka square in Jerusalem at 2:00 pm. They blocked mainly the public transportation, served by Egged, allowed some buses to pass from time to time, and blocked the square again, when it was organized mainly by the disabled Arabian Abu Shanab. Some Japanese tourists who visited the Knesset, passed by the demonstration and fully recorded it. Disabled people blocked also the National Square near the Supreme Court, the Light Rail and the traffic by the Chords Bridge. At 3:25 pm, Ravit Ben Baruch in a white shirt, Hannah Kim, a publicist and a mother of two children with autism, in a black dress, Yael Nitzav with a backpack, and Yaffa Friedman, came in the Knesset and wanted to submit a diploma of disgrace to the Minister of Communications Ayoob Kara and to the rest of the 119 MKs, but a security man forcibly seized the diplomas, banned the entry credentials of the four ladies and deported them out of the Knesset. Before the deportation, Heidi Moses, a daughter of Eliezer Moses, asked Ben Baruch why she did not attend the session of "Kulanu" with Kahlon, which was held nearby, and claimed that the diplomas were propaganda papers, and were seized by a decision of The Knesset officer. At the same time, another group of activists of the Likud stood nearby with a paper which praised the Likud, and recorded itself by a video, while the officer in charge looked at it with indifference. Ben Baruch replied Moses that Kahlon returned the disabled people to the roads to fight upon their lives. Moses told Kim that she was ten years in the Knesset and made achievements with Netanyahu. Kim asked Moses why she did not prevent the voting of Netanyahu against the correction of the Surrogacy Law, and Moses called Kim "Darling", claiming that Kim shot the arrows towards the wrong human being.

On 7 August 2018, the Disabled Panthers with additional disabled Israelis, blocked the exits at the Ben Gurion Airport. The police distributed bottles of water to the disabled demonstrators, who protested from 4:00 p.m. until 8:20 pm, and were filmed and interviewed by all the Israeli television channels, more than once. Eyal Cohen advertised the demands of the Panthers in the demonstration at the Ben Gurion Airport:

"	1.	It is inconceivable that there are people in the State of Israel who have to choose between food and medicine.
	2.	The State has determined by law that the minimum wage for a dignified life is 5,300 ILS for a healthy person.
	3.	It is impossible that the state would demand from a person to live by a miserable pension, after the state had determined that this person lost the ability to earn a living, and had to get a medical and psychological treatment, or from a person who reached the elderly age. We demand from the government the minimal necessity for living in dignity!
	4.	Before the government wastes billions of Israeli new shekels from the public funds on pointless projects such as submarines, huge salaries for elected officials, and political appointments, we demand the minimum amount for living in dignity for the weakened population.
	5.	Before the Minister of Finance reaches out and takes surplus collection from the National Insurance Institute in the amount of billions ILS in a year, we demand a fair distribution in the sum of the minimum wage for the weakened population.
	6.	We demand the minimum of 5,300 ILS to live in dignity.
		Public officials send false and misleading messages to the public by calling the despicable agreement, which was decided unilaterally, "a solemn and historic agreement." The above agreement does not reflect and has no agreement on the part of the organizations of the disabled and the disabled people in the state.
		Because the minimum is the living in dignity!"

On 15 October 2018, the Disabled Panthers demonstrated in front of the Knesset, and Amnon Ben-Ataf was pushed to the ground by a police officer. On 20 November 2018, the Disabled Panthers blocked the rail crossing near Yakum, until they were evicted by the police. Afterwards, Eyal Cohen made a speech and said:

"Recently a lot of people, the disabled people as well as the general public, have asked me about the blockades and the public support in the struggle of the disabled.
Now I turn to you with a question which gives you something to think about. The support which we get, according to what it seems, is: "Sit at home quietly, do not disturb us, we will support you".
Let us look back sixteen years. Sixteen years of a struggle, when the last one and a half years have been tougher. What sign did we see? What statement have we seen from the public which supports us? Except a like in Facebook and a siren on the road of folks who pass by. Not the drivers who are blocked. With likes on Facebook, we will not go to the grocery store and shall not buy medicines. Even with a siren of encouragement, we cannot bring food home.
The question is what we look for. Do we really want to get results, or just sit quietly at home and being liked? They will like us as poor people, who beg for bread, or they would dislike us and we could go to the grocery store and live in dignity.
The upcoming elections have awakened some members of the disabled organizations, who want to run for the Knesset. Their way is to step upon corpses, and they go out against the Panthers, against anyone who acts, because their main reason is the public opinion.
So think now, each one with himself, what do you prefer. Being liked by the audience, but remaining in poverty, or being disliked by the audience, but being able to go to the grocery store, buy medicine and live in dignity.
If most of the disabled public tells me that it prefers to be liked when it sits at home quietly and does not speak, I will accept it. I will stop the struggle, following the majority. If most of the disabled people tells me that we have to continue to fight and would not care what they think about us, because we care about the disabled and the elderly, not what the healthy people think about us, we will continue to intensify the struggle.
Yesterday, on railway, it was a step up. To this day, we have not been evicted forcibly. From now and on, these images would repeat themselves time after time. It depends on you. Have a wonderful day for everyone." Similar words were said in the television show "Talk of the day" with Lucy Aharish on 21 November 2018, and Aharish said her opinion against the lawmakers. On 26 November 2018, Cohen made an additional speech, and talked about the misleading which has been made by the government.

The legislation determined that at the end of 2019, the disabled people would accept at least 3,700 ILS. Due to the April 2019 Israeli legislative election and the September 2019 Israeli legislative election, a provisional government could not approve such an extra budget, in the amount of billions of shekels. As a result, the disabled people initiated a demonstration in Tel Aviv on 31 October 2019.

== See also ==
- Welfare in Israel
