= Hanna Akiva =

Israeli social activist

Hannah Akiva
- חנה עקיבא
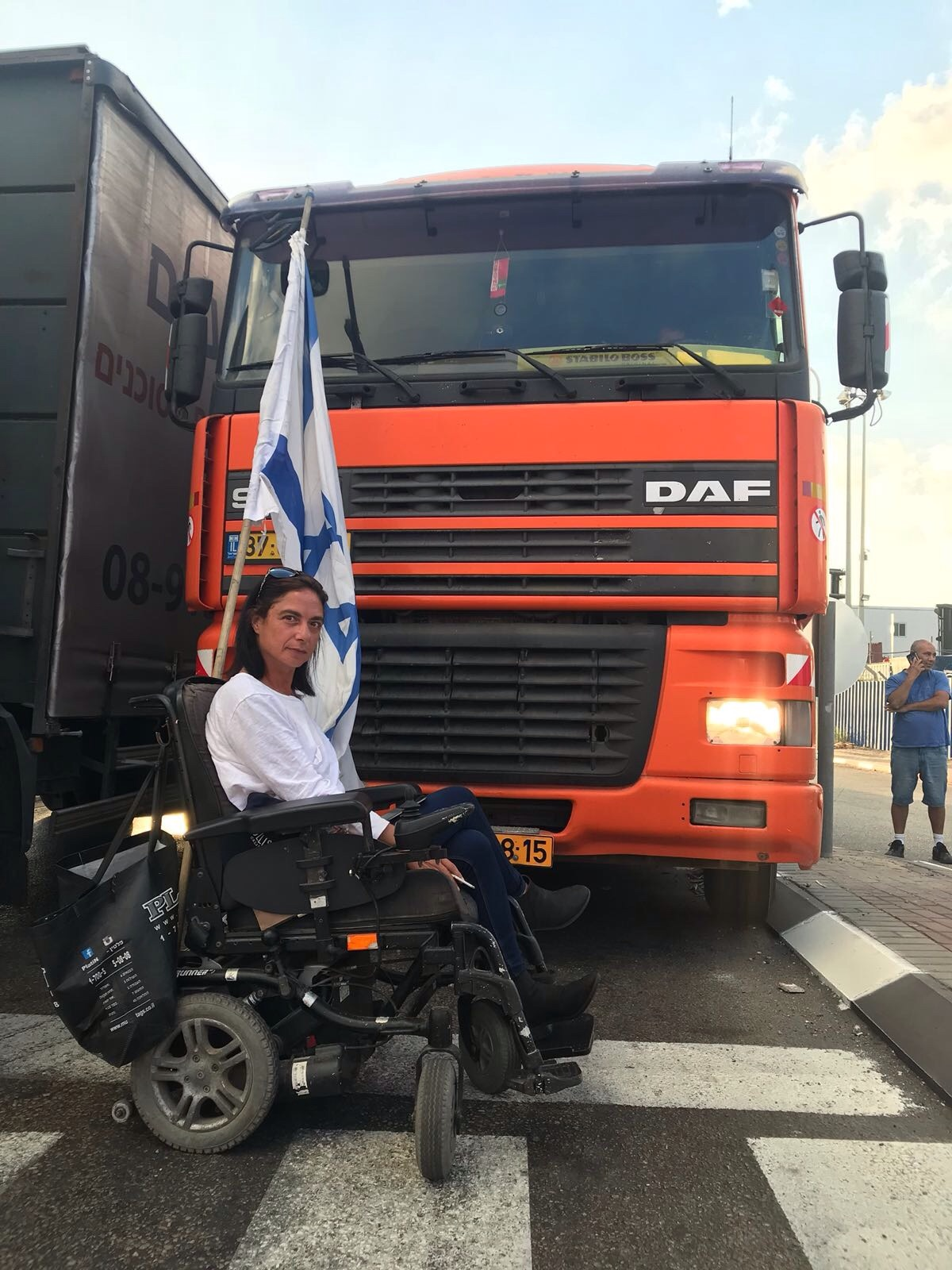
- Hanna Akiva, Port of Ashdod, October 3, 2017
- Born: 4 April 1974 (age 52); Herzliya, Israel
- Education: Israel Goldstein Youth Village
- Occupation: Social activist
- Children: 1 daughter

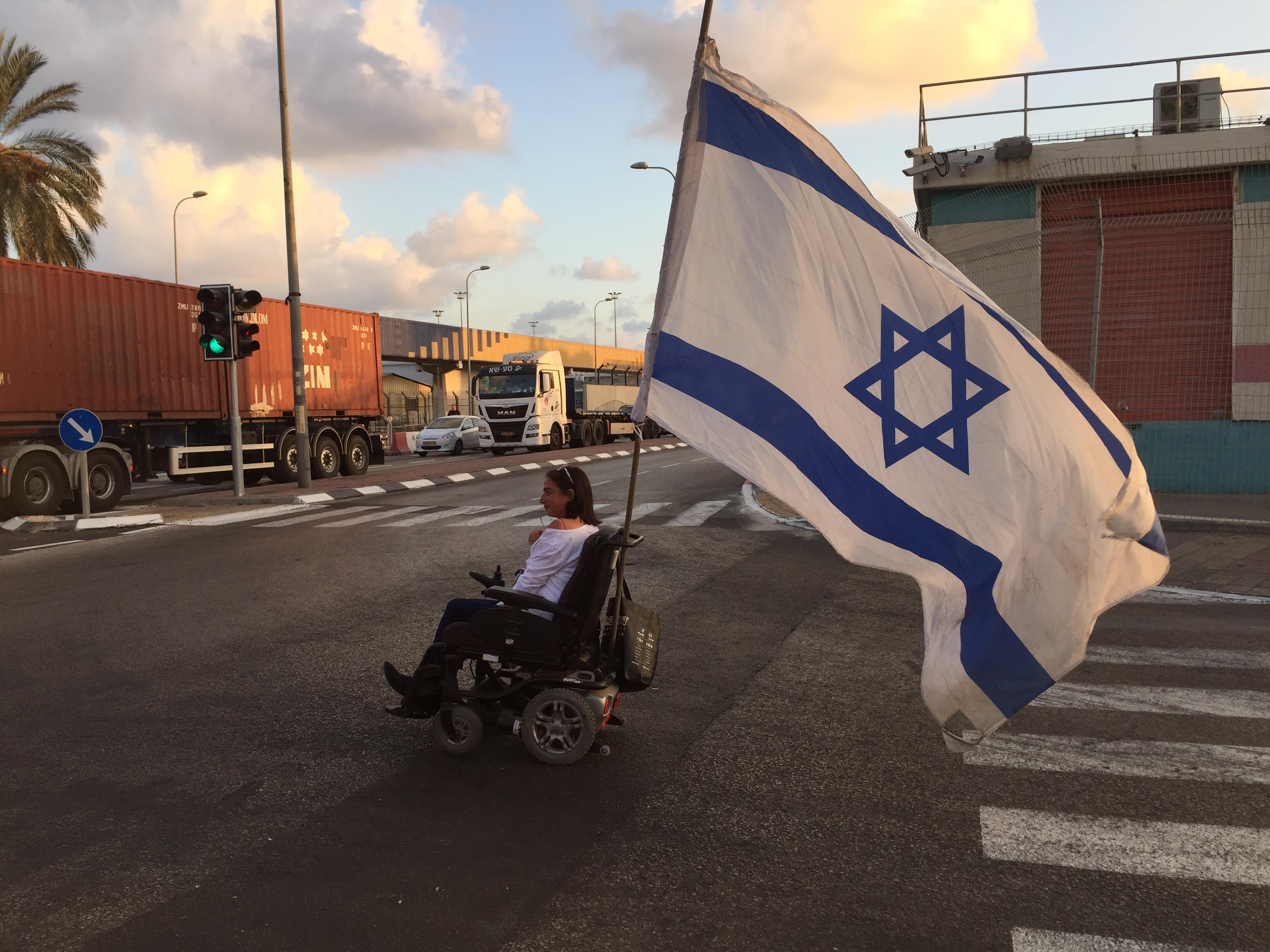
Akiva at Port of Ashdod, October 3, 2017.

Hannah Akiva (Hebrew: חנה עקיבא; born April 4, 1974) is an Israeli social activist and a leader of "The Disabled Panthers", a group working towards getting a minimum wage in Israel, after paying social insurance throughout their years of work. "The Disabled Panthers" came from "The Organization for advancing the rights of the disabled people", a registered association since October 22, 2017. Akiva has been a disabled woman since her late twenties.

== Life ==
Akiva was born healthy in Herzliya as the sixth child of a family of four boys and four girls. Her father, Haim, who emigrated from Morocco, died in 1981 when she was seven years old and her mother, Miriam (Munira), who emigrated from Iraq, died on September 28, 2014. Akiva maintains Jewish tradition.

Akiva studied at Israel Goldstein Youth Village in Jerusalem in Hospitality management studies until the middle of the tenth grade. After her studies, she returned to Herzliya, where she served in the Israel Defense Forces in the Signal Corps at the supreme command post at the Kirya.

In 1997 she had a daughter.

She worked in a meat products factory in Ra'anana, but on October 16, 2003, she had a stroke that left her paralyzed in the left half of her body. The National Insurance Institute made her a disability rate of 76 percent on October 5, 2008, and she is entitled to a general disability pension, a mobility allowance and a special service allowance for payment to a daily caregiver. Akiva drives a van equipped with a wheelchair elevator, a remote-controlled 90-degree steering driving chair, and a joystick that activates the steering wheel and the car controls.

For 15 years, Akiva was in a relationship with a man. After her disability, she continued to raise her daughter, who served in the Israel Defense Forces at the Kirya.

== Public activity ==
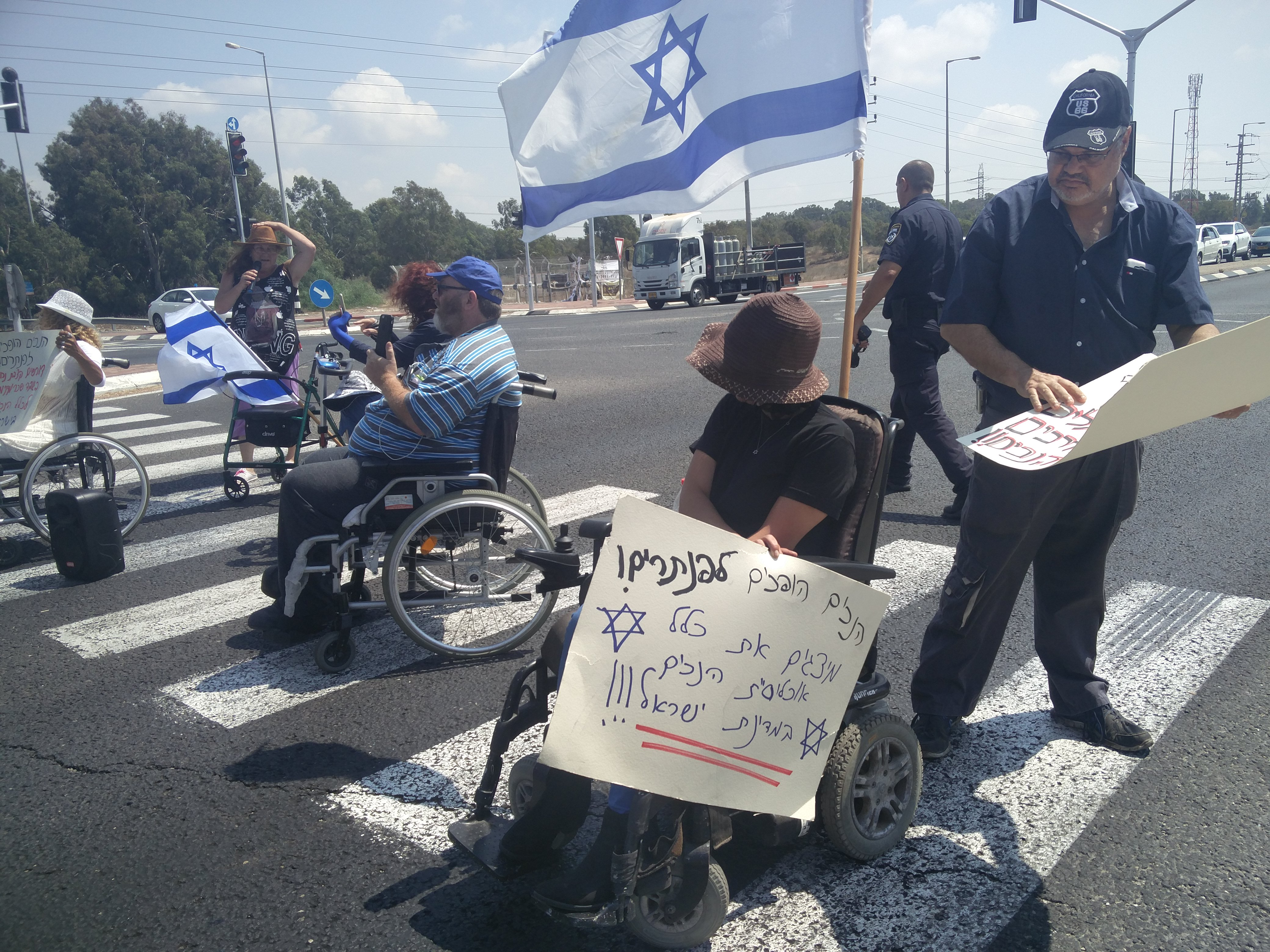
Akiva at Or Akiva, Amnon Ben-Ataf stood behind her. August 21, 2017.

In July 2017, Akiva learned about Eyal Cohen, founder of "The Disabled Panthers", when she watched an item about him on the television, and on July 18 she joined the organization's Facebook page. In August 2017, Akiva decided to join actually the Panthers on the roads after watching the news in the First Edition under the guidance of Oren Weigenfeld in a televised debate between Avital Cohen, an activist of the struggle for disabled people headed by Naomi Moravia, and Professor Avi Simhon, chairman of the National Economic Council in the Prime Minister's Office. Simhon claimed that the pension did not include state aid treatment for medication, which was paid separately. Simhon misled the audience, because the IDF veterans received a discount on medication, but not the general handicapped people. Akiva spent money on medication and licensed cannabis more than 1,000 Israeli new shekels (ILS) per month. After the arguments of Simhon, she joined the demonstration of the Disabled Panthers at Or Akiva on August 21, 2017, and held a sign of the Panthers alongside other Panthers. On August 24, 2017, Akiva blocked again Highway 1 to Jerusalem with her red van.

On September 5, 2017, Akiva blocked a road in Caesarea with her car, and took her place with a red shirt alongside Eyal Cohen. On September 14, 2017, Akiva approached Prime Minister Benjamin Netanyahu via Channel Two News and offered him with tears to exchange with her for one minute.

On September 17, 2017, a driver attacked Akiva during a blockage on Highway 4 near Hadera, after she had prevented him from driving on the sidewalk on his way to the hospital, and her arm was bandaged by a Magen David Adom team. The driver was arrested for questioning, and Akiva was interviewed on Channel Ten at five o'clock by Rafi Reshef. On September 27, 2017, the Israel Police arrested Yael Nitzav, an able-bodied activist who participated in the Panthers' demonstration. In response, Akiva got out of her wheelchair, laid down on the road and hugged Nitzav. As a result, the police released Nitzav's handcuffs.

Akiva shows traffic tickets at minute 10:30. Ayalon Highway, October 3, 2017.

On October 3, 2017, while blocking the entrance to Port of Ashdod in the morning, Akiva received a traffic ticket from the police, and an additional ticket afterward, when she drove at a speed of 5 kilometres per hour from Ashdod to north on Route 431. As a result, she blocked the Ayalon Highway at the Holot interchange near Rishon LeZion at evening. Akiva refused to clear the road and demanded that her tickets would be canceled. The police used a force upon Akiva and also towed Akiva vehicle. Akiva laid down on the road and police called an ambulance, which evicted her to Wolfson Medical Center.

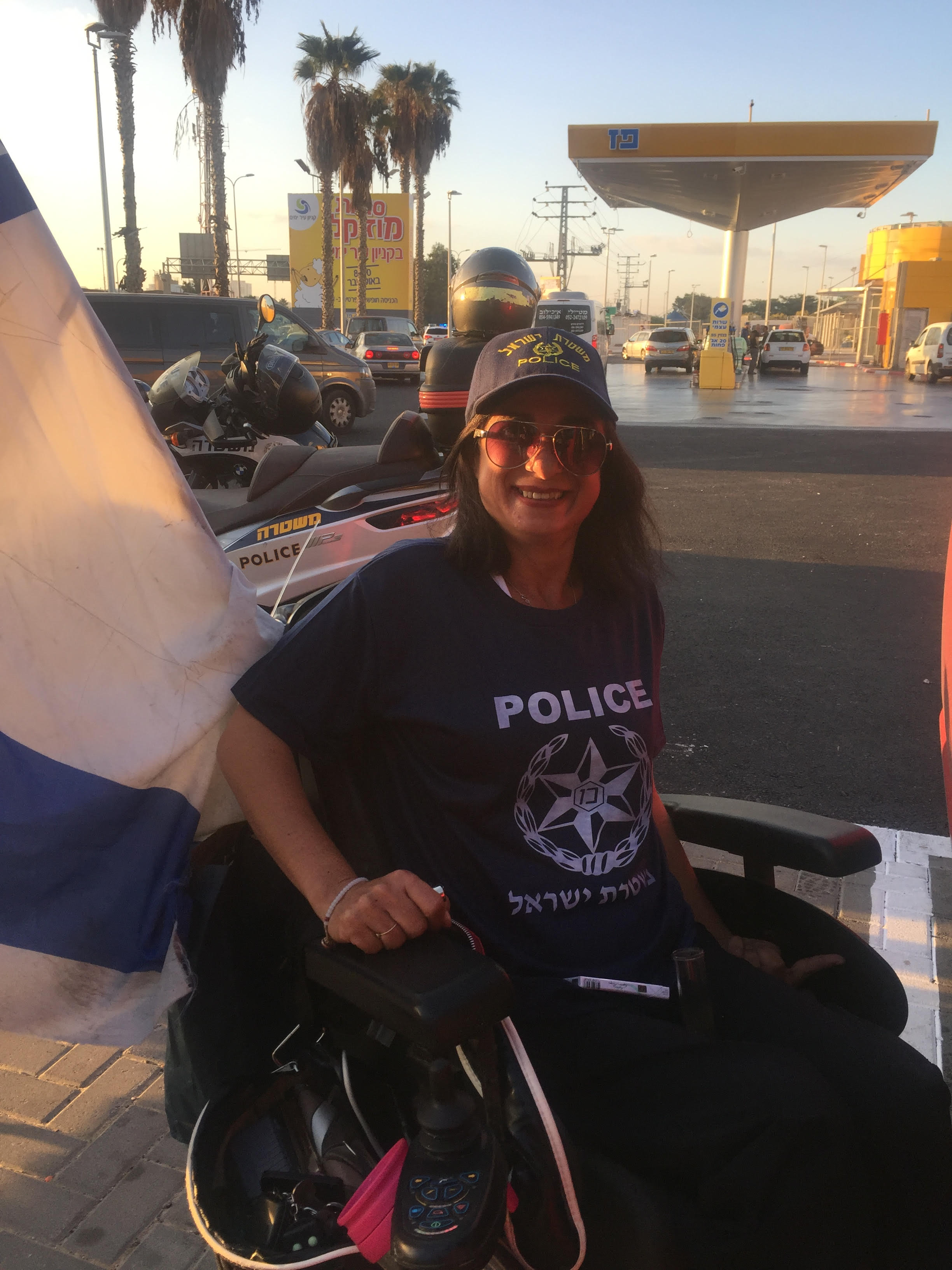
Akiva at a Gas station by Netanya before going on Road 2, October 15, 2017.

On October 15, 2017, the disabled people traveled slowly with their wheelchairs on Road 2 (the coastal highway) near Netanya, and Akiva took Sasson Ozer, a chairman of the Herzliya disabled people club, who drove his wheelchair behind her on Road 2.

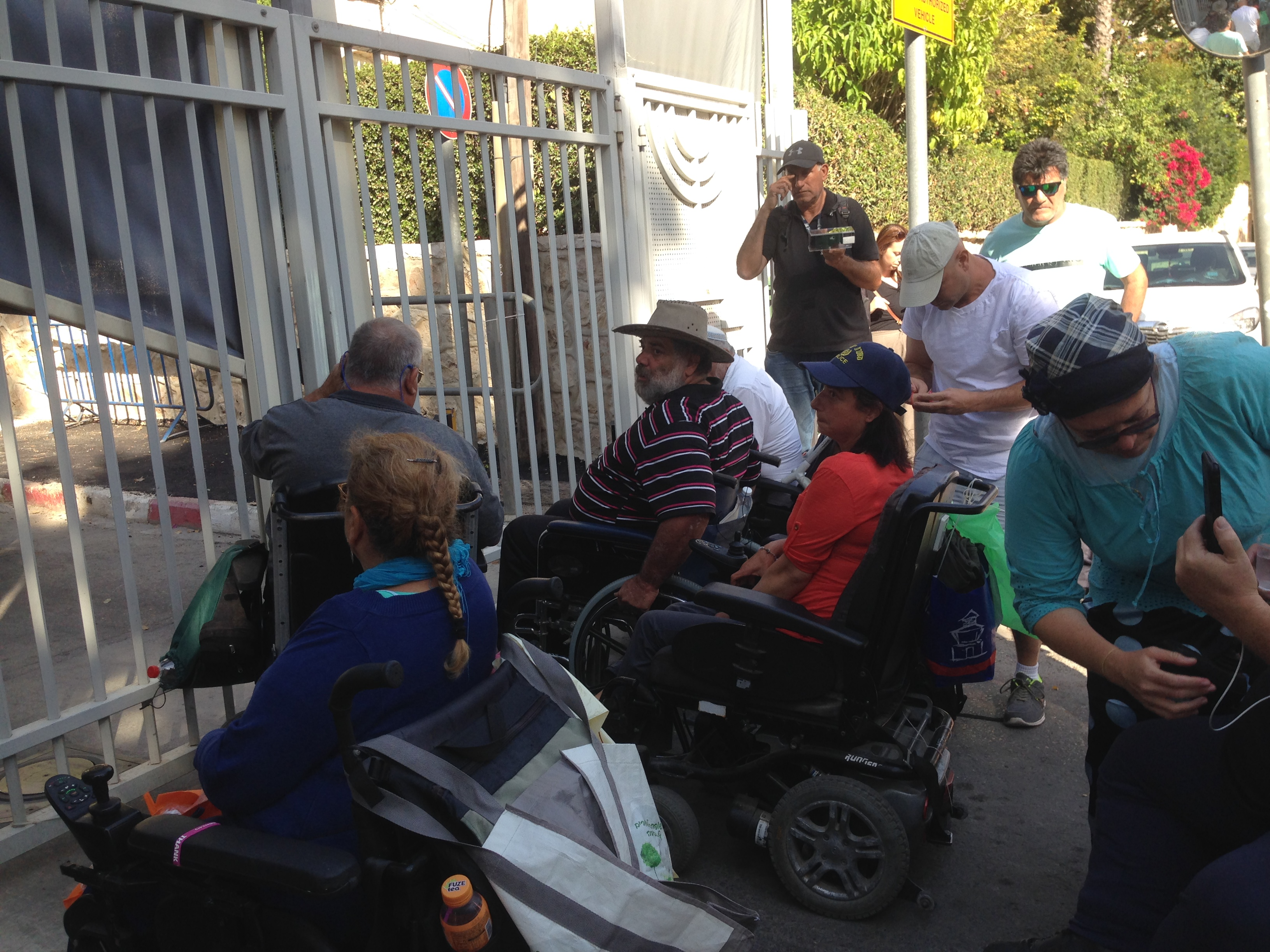
Akiva blocks the entrance to Prime Minister's Residence, October 17, 2017. Raanan Kerklies, who passed away on May 23, 2018, was in a gray shirt with his back to the camera.

On October 17, 2017, in Jerusalem, Akiva blocked with Eyal Cohen and other Panthers the southern entrance to the Prime Minister's Residence (Beit Aghion) on Balfour Street. Akiva was approached by Nicole Raidman, whose entrance was also blocked. Raidman gave Akiva 2,000 ILS and caused a media storm, but Akiva donated the entire amount for the expenses of the Panthers. A day later Raidman came to Akiva with Galit Gutmann, and made it clear that she could not believe what she heard. A week later, Akiva and Raidman met again on Rademan's radio program on "100FM".

On December 7, 2017, while blocking Road 2 near Yakum Sharon region Deputy Commander, Commander Yitzhak Menashe forcibly evicted Akiva, and she fell on the road. As a result of her fall, her right hand ached. Superintendent Ariel Israelov, a police officer at Kadima-Zoran station, bandaged her hand.

On January 2, 2018, Akiva appeared on Reshet 13 in the investigation program "The System" narrated by Miki Haimovich at 9:00 pm, and in the morning she was interviewed with Haimovitch at the "Reshet" studio on "The world this morning" show by Avri Gilad and Maya Ziv-Wolf.

On January 23, 2018, the police prevented Akiva and her disabled friends from boarding their cars at a gas station near Shoresh, and Elieazer Rotman was physically injured when his wheelchair was pushed by police. In response, Attorney Gil Goldreich, the legal advisor of the Disabled Panthers, submitted a complaint to the Police Internal Investigations Department.

On February 5, 2018, a discussion was held at the Knesset Labor, Welfare and Health Committee on the proposed National Insurance Law (Amendment – Comparing disability pension to the minimum wage) submitted by Member of Knesset Ilan Gilon, and two similar bills which were attached to it. Akiva represented the Disabled Panthers and discussed with MKs Mickey Rosenthal and Eli Alaluf. Akiva asked Rosenthal twice why she would not get the 100% loss of her workability if her doctor determined that she was 100% unfit. Then she asked Alaluf nine times when the disability pension would be the minimum wage, until Alaluf replied to her that when he had seen her at the demonstrations, he suffered like her, but did not provide the answer due to lack of knowledge, as he made clear to her.

On February 12, 2018, the National Insurance Law was approved by the Labor, Welfare and Health Committee, and Akiva also participated in the committee. The sums set did not meet the requirements of Akiva and the Panthers, but were accepted lawfully by the Knesset plenum on the night of February 12–13. In response, Akiva barricaded herself at the Knesset with other disabled people, slept at the Knesset whole night, and after an agreement with the Knesset officer, she voluntarily left the Knesset with the rest of disabled people.

As a protest against the enactment of the reduced amounts, the Disabled Panthers went on March 4, 2018, for a four days journey from Haifa to the Knesset in Jerusalem. On March 5, the police blocked the car of the Panthers leader, Eyal Cohen, on Weizmann street in Herzliya. Then Akiva arrived and negotiated with the police. She asked Brigadier General Daniel Levy whether the police laws were different in different cities, because the police in Netanya allowed disabled people to protest at its street, asked him to give them half an hour to protest and leave, and added that she was a resident of the city. Levy consulted with a second officer with the rank of Chief Superintendent, and the blocking of Cohen's vehicle was removed. Later that day, the journey stopped because Cohen did not feel well.

On International Women's Day, which took place on March 8, the disabled people praised Akiva, and Amnon Ben-Ataf wrote: "I met Hanna in my first block in Or Akiva, and she was a shy woman who did not stand out. From the first moment, I realized that there was much more at this woman than what you saw from outside. She has made her way to the leadership of the Panthers, learned how to deal with all the problems, is a model for many disabled people, women and men, the disabled and the healthy". Ben-Ataf himself appeared at the media as well, after he had confronted MK David Bitan near his home in Rishon LeZion, when Akiva blocked Bitan on the same day.

In March 2018, the magazine "Lady Globes" chose Akiva as one of Israel's twenty activist women of 2018.

In the film "A Heroine on Wheels" at minute 0:26, Akiva told an Israeli passenger: "With your love, I am not going to buy a bread at the grocery store", Geha Highway, January 21, 2018, Israel.

On March 18, 2018, Akiva became an executive member in "The Organization for advancing the rights of the disabled people", and was granted a printed business card from the organization.

On May 7, 2018, a film about Akiva whose name was "A Heroine on Wheels" was screened at the Herzliya Cinematheque. The film was created and produced by the students of the communications program at "Hayovel" High School in Herzliya.

On May 25, 2018, TheMarker published an article about the OECD and Israel, an OECD member, discussing its poverty and cost of living. TheMarker inserted a photo of Akiva blocking southern Ayalon Highway as the first picture at its publication.

On July 24, 2018, Akiva blocked the Israel Railways between Beit Yehoshua and Shefayim, near Rishpon, with several Disabled activists for one and half hour, and was interviewed. Before her interview, Akiva greeted warmly Superintendent Israelov in the black uniform who also arrived there.

On August 3, 2018, Shay Stern interviewed Akiva on Channel Ten. When Shay asked Akiva what the Prime Minister promised the disabled people, Akiva smiled widely and almost laughed. She asked Shay if he was kidding, said that they have already been on the roads for a year, and asked how long it took the Prime Minister to study the case. Then she talked about Raidman's contribution and attitude.

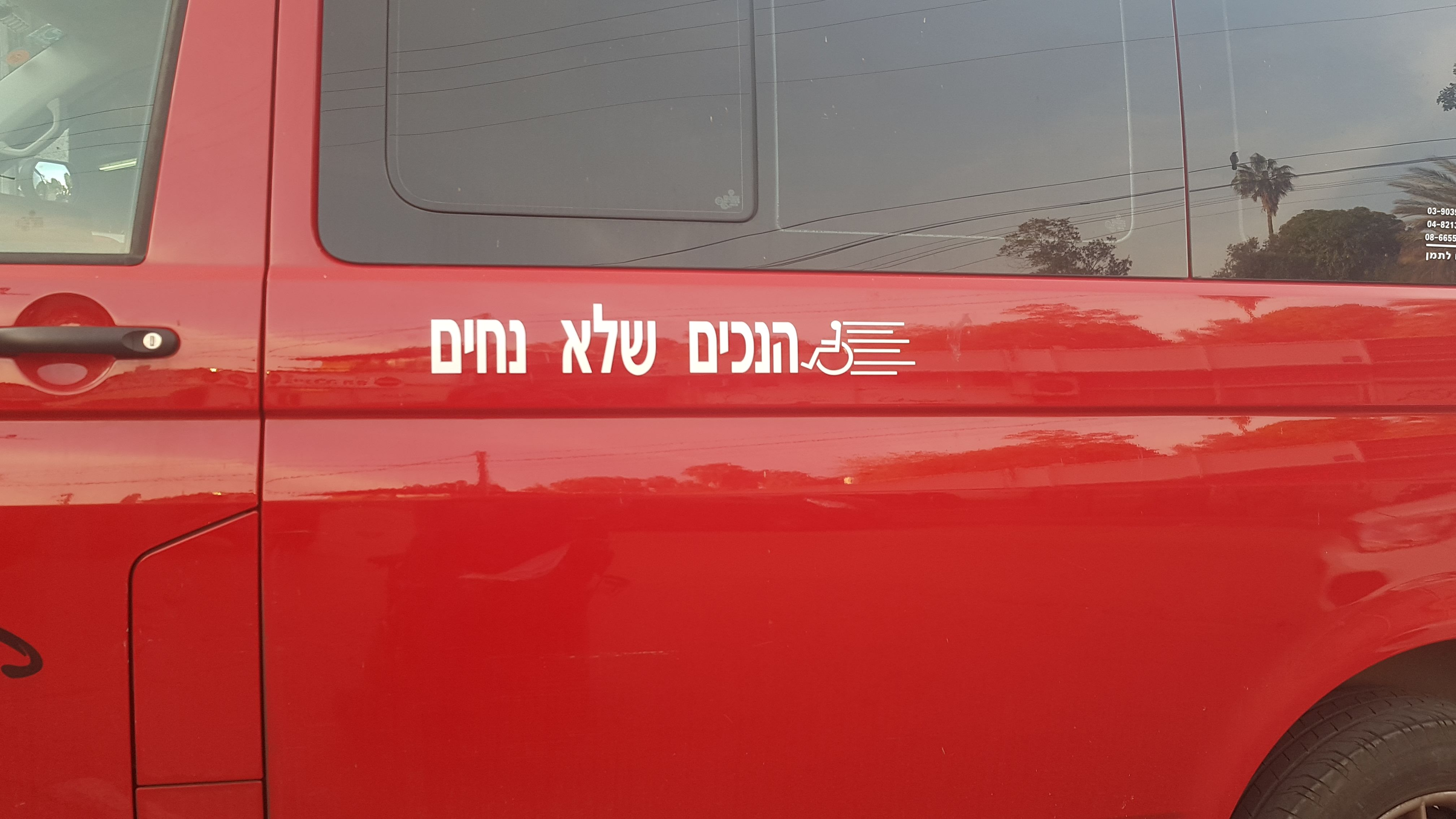
The logo of The disabled people who do not rest, which are led by Akiva. Tel Aviv, November 26, 2018.

On August 7, 2018, the Disabled Panthers blocked the exits in the Ben Gurion International Airport from 4:00 p.m. until 8:20 p.m., and Akiva was embraced by Tal Gilboa, who arrived there.

On August 23, 2018, there was a road show in the evening in Bat Yam, which was led by Iris Haya Zigdon, a disabled woman from the Panthers team, who lived in Bat Yam and managed a theatre of disabled actresses and actors. Shachaf Mahfood, a Panthers' activist, took a picture of Akiva with Eyal Cohen on her right side, and his wife Hani Dafna Cohen on her left.

On November 18, 2018, Akiva ended her way with the board of the Disabled Panthers, and on November 26, 2018, she established "The disabled people who do not rest". On November 27, 2018, she blocked two lanes on Highway 2 near Glilot junction with Ben-Ataf and other disabled members, from 10:30 a.m. to 11:30 a.m., with the assistance of the police. On November 27, 2018 at 3:11 p.m., Akiva sent via WhatsApp four photographs and a video record (length 1:12 minute) of the blocking, and wrote the action times.

== See also ==
- Demonstration (protest)
- Disability rights in Israel
- Disability pension
