= Timeline of strikes in 2002 =

Strikes in 2002

A number of labour strikes, labour disputes, and other industrial actions occurred in 2002.

== Background ==
A labour strike is a work stoppage caused by the mass refusal of employees to work. This can include wildcat strikes, which are done without union authorisation, and slowdown strikes, where workers reduce their productivity while still carrying out minimal working duties. It is usually a response to employee grievances, such as low pay or poor working conditions. Strikes can also occur to demonstrate solidarity with workers in other workplaces or pressure governments to change policies.

== Timeline ==
=== Continuing strikes from 2001 ===
- 2000–03 prisoners' hunger strike in Turkey

=== January ===
- January 2002 Aceh general strike, 3-day general strike organised by the separatist Free Aceh Movement.
- 2002 Biscuiterie Nantaise strike 3-week strike by Biscuiterie Nantaise workers.
- 2002–2003 Chinese protest movement
- 2002 Malagasy political crisis, including strikes.
- 2002 Nigerian police strike
- 2002 Norwegian nurses' strike
- 2002 Woomera hunger strikes, series of hunger strikes by asylum seekers detained in the Woomera Immigration Reception and Processing Centre, Australia.

=== March ===
- 2002 Lyon public transit strike, 22-day strike by public transport workers in Lyon, France, over salaries.

=== April ===
- 2002 Athens newspapers' strike
- 2002 Fabryka Kabli strike, strike by workers at the Fabryka Kabli in Ożarów, Poland, over Tele-Fonika's decision to close the factory.
- 16 April 2002 Italian general strike
- April 2002 Nepalese general strike, 5-day general strike organised by the Communist Party of Nepal (Maoist Centre); part of the Nepalese Civil War.

=== May ===
- 2002 deaf Israelis' strike
- 2002 Chad-Cameroon pipeline strike, 2-week strike by workers on the Chad–Cameroon Petroleum Development and Pipeline Project.
- 2002 Lustucru strike, month-long strike by Lustucru workers in France.

=== June ===
- 20 June 2002 general strike, in Spain.
- 2002 Navistar strike, 6-week strike by Navistar International factory workers in Ontario, Canada.
- 2002 Toronto garbage strike

=== August ===
- 2002 DR strike, 4-week strike by journalists at DR, the Danish national broadcaster, over the introduction of a new wages system.
- 2002–2003 Plum Island Animal Disease Center strike, 7-month strike by Plum Island Animal Disease Center workers in the United States.

=== October ===
- 2002 Boston janitors' strike, 3-week strike by janitors in Boston, United States, represented by the Service Employees International Union calling for workers classed as part-time to receive health insurance.

=== November ===
- 2002 Swiss construction strike, 1-day strike by construction workers in Switzerland against lowering the age of retirement; the first nationwide strike in the country since 1947.
- 2002–2003 United Kingdom firefighter dispute

=== December ===
- 2002 Siberian air traffic controllers' hunger strike
- 2002–2003 Venezuelan general strike
