= 2010 Chinese labour unrest =

Labour dispute

Reported locations of labour incidents (including strikes, protests, and confrontations) in China in 2010

The 2010 Chinese labour unrest was a series of labour disputes, strike actions, and protests in the south of the People's Republic of China that saw striking workers successfully receive higher pay packages.

Among the incidents were a string of employee suicides at Taiwan-owned electronics manufacturer Foxconn and strike actions at Honda factories in Guangdong province, both of which resulted in wage increases.

The Economist stated that wages were merely rising to make up for lost ground due to wage freezes, and China's inflationary monetary environment at the time made regular pay rises a necessity for workers concerned with maintaining a high quality of life. Reuters quoted Toyota CEO Akio Toyoda, as saying, "this has both good and bad elements. A wage increase is not necessarily bad if properly managed. The experience of the past 100 years shows that auto workers become auto consumers also."

The events at Honda and Foxconn were followed by a string of labour-related protests and strikes at foreign-owned factories, mostly in the south of the country.

== Foreign companies ==
Although most of the strikes did take place at foreign-owned facilities, a few Chinese companies also experienced labor unrest.

=== Foxconn ===
In 2009 Sun Danyong, an employee of electronics manufacturer Foxconn Technology Group, committed suicide. Reports emerged of questionable labour practices at Foxconn factories, and a number of other suicides occurred in 2010. Foxconn announced that workers with a monthly wage of 900 RMB ($131.77 at the time) would immediately receive a 30% increase, to 1200 RMB, with a spokesman stating that "It's been a while since we increased wages, hence the decision."

=== Honda ===
Starting 17 May, a prolonged strike at a Honda automobile parts factory resulted in suspension of operations at all four of Honda's Chinese production bases, which are located in Guangdong and Hubei provinces. The high-profile strike was covered in domestic and international media.

Pay raises of 24% halted the strike action in early June.

Honda is believed to have lost 3 billion yuan in sales as a result.

Other strikes at different Honda parts factories followed.

=== Toyota ===
In mid-June strikes spread to Toyota plants.

== Media response ==
According to The New York Times after initial nationwide coverage of the strikes, domestic media coverage was swiftly curtailed. Restrictions on the local, Chinese press were also reported by The Financial Times.

The same day as The New York Times report, China Daily published seven articles (3 of them rewrites/reposts) dealing with the strikes and worker relations, however.

== Technology aids strikers ==
The New York Times mentioned the use of technology by striking workers in one article. Detailed accounts of strikes were posted online by the strikers hours after they began, and videos were uploaded by the strikers showing confrontations between management and employees. Striking workers avoided using popular online networking tool QQ in favour of text messaging to escape the scrutiny of government internet censors who regularly monitor the site. Online forums were used to share strategies and grievances.

== Economic policy implications ==
Economist Cai Fang remarked in a paper cited by China Daily that the country has hit its Lewisian turning point and mentioned that China must seek "new engines for economic growth".

China is considering taking policy steps to double average wages over the five years from 2011, and several Chinese provinces raised the legal minimum wage. State media also stated that higher wages will help boost domestic consumption and help move China away from a reliance on exports for growth towards an economy more driven by domestic consumption.

Economist Andy Xie said that there is ample scope for increased wages in China due to its superior infrastructure as compared to competing, low-wage alternative nations.

== Government response ==
Strikes are not new in China. Chinese authorities have long tolerated limited, local protests by workers unhappy over wages or other issues. The Pearl River Delta alone has up to 10,000 labor disputes each year. In the spring of 2008, a local union official described strikes as "as natural as arguments between a husband and wife". The Chinese government sought balance on the issue; while it has recently repeated calls for increased domestic consumption through wage increases and regulations, it is also aware that labour unrest could cause political instability.

In response to the string of employee suicides at Foxconn, Guangdong CPC chief Wang Yang called on companies to improve their treatment of workers. Wang said that "economic growth should be people-oriented". As the strikes intensified, Wang went further by calling for more effective negotiations mechanisms, particularly the reform of existing trade unions. At the same time, authorities began shutting down some websites reporting on the labour incidents, and have restricted reporting, particularly on strikes occurring at domestic-owned factories. Guangdong province also announced plans to "professionalize union staff" by taking union representatives off of company payroll to ensure their independence from management influence.

On 14 June, Premier Wen Jiabao visited construction workers on Beijing Subway's Line 6. Wen said to the workers: "Your work is glorious and should be respected by society at large. Migrant workers should be cared for, protected and respected, especially the younger generation of them ... The government and the public should be treating the young migrant workers like their own children." A day later, without mention of strikes, People's Daily released an editorial that warned the country's manufacturing model could be at a turning point and urged employers to raise salaries. In addition, the party's official newspaper said that China's development model should look towards creating more service-sector jobs and increasing domestic consumption.

== List of labour incidents ==
The following is a list of cases; the list is not complete.

Site of unrest	Owner origin	Factory location	Event	Resolution
Foxconn	Taiwan	Shenzhen Guangdong	Numerous suicides. Protests follow in Shenzhen and Hong Kong	Management offers pay raises of some 30% to 2000 yuan/month in Shenzhen plant, similar raises elsewhere "according to local conditions".
Honda Lock	Japan	Xiaolan Zhongshan Guangdong	Protest	Workers return after management offers review of salaries.
Honda Foshan Fengfu auto parts	Japan	Foshan Guangdong	Protests and factory cordoned off by police to prevent workers from leaving during work hours; police clash with workers on 31 May.	Management increases salary from 939 yuan a month to 1,600 yuan. Two week strike ends 11 June.
Flextronics plant	U.S.	Zhuhai, Guangdong	Nearly 1000 workers on strike, demanding wage raises similar to those at Foxconn	
Chimei Innolux Corp (formerly TPO displays)	Taiwan	Pudong, Shanghai	Labor dispute over merger	resolved without pay hike
Brother	Japan	Xi'an	Two sewing machine factories halted production for about a week.	Workers return, amidst negotiations with management on pay and conditions.
Merry Electronics	–	Shenzhen Guangdong	1,000 employees on strike on 6 June	Strike ends after 10% pay increase.
Yacheng Electronics	South Korea	Huizhou Guangdong	2,000 employees on strike, demanding better wages and less overtime	
KOK Machinery	Taiwan	Kunshan, Jiangsu	2,000 workers clashed with police on 7 June 50 workers injured in clash with police	Strike ends after agreement reached.
Henan Pingmian Textiles Group	Zhejiang	Pingdingshan, Henan	5,500 workers on strike, asking for better pay and working conditions	
Nujiang Transportation Group	Local	Nujiang Lisu A.P., Yunnan	More than 120 long-distance bus drivers on strike beginning in April	
Tianjin Star Light Rubber & Plastic	Japanese/Chinese joint venture	Tianjin	Workers strike	Employees return to work after the company agrees to review the pay structure.
Toyoda Gosei Co.	Japan	Tianjin	Workers strike after labor and management had agreed, in principle, to a 20% pay raise. Around 40 employees in the distribution division walk off the job, demanding more.	Strike ends with 20% wage increases and added benefits.
Toyota Tianjin Assembly Plant	Japanese/Chinese joint venture	Tianjin	Lack of parts produced by Tianjin parts factories results in partial suspension of production	Work resumes after strike at suppliers settled.
Chongqing Brewery Company / Carlsberg	Chinese/Danish joint venture	Chongqing	Workers of joint venture brewery with Carlsberg strike to oppose share sale. Carlsberg wants to increase stake in CBC from 17.46% to 29.71%.	
Denso (Guangzhou Nansha)	Japan	Guangzhou	Workers at Toyota-affiliated parts maker strike. Lack of injectors leads to work stoppage at Chinese operations of Toyota and Honda	Workers return after two-day strike, ending parts shortage at car factories
NHK Spring	Japan	Guangzhou	Workers go on strike. Lack of parts shuts down second Honda plant	NHK strike settled after one day.
Jiexiu factory (textile, dye, paper, ceramics division)	state-run	Shanxi	Week long protest ending June 2010. 25% of sacked workers received no pension or medical insurance as stipulated in their benefit packages. Issue has been going on since 2001.	
Honda Automobile (China) Co.	Japanese/Chinese joint venture	Guangzhou	First strike at car joint venture: Workers strike for two days, return after concessions.	Work resumes after two-day strike
Omron	Japan	Guangzhou	800 workers go on strike demanding 40% pay raise	

== See also ==
- 2002-2003 Chinese protest movement
- Labor relations in China
