= Me'usharot =

- Also known as: Wealthy Women
- Genre: Reality television
- Based on: The Real Housewives
- Starring: Nicol Raidman; Lea Shnirer; Iris Zander; Yael Gal; Tali Sinai Riklis; Dafna Shahar; Eti Dudai; Inbar Shenhav; Jennifer Snookel; Keren Ben David; Phillip Vazana; Alice Avivi; Shulamit Afiot von Bismarck: Elior Kasovich; Dalya Arzi
- Country of origin: Israel
- Original language: Hebrew
- No. of seasons: 3
- No. of episodes: 53

Production
- Running time: 40-45 minutes

Original release
- Network: Channel 10
- Release: October 24, 2011 – July 24, 2013

Me'usharot (Hebrew: מעושרות; Wealthy Women ) was an Israeli reality television series which premiered on Channel 10 on October 24, 2011. The show is based on The Real Housewives, an American television franchise. The show features six different women, and focuses on their personal and professional lives.

== Production ==
The series premiered in Israel on October 24, 2011. 22 episodes aired during the first season. After the first season finished airing, the series was canceled, but in 2012 it was picked up for a second season which was filmed in 2012 and premiered on May 4, 2013. 16 episodes aired during the second season. The third season had a revamped cast and integrated a male cast member into the cast. 15 episodes were aired during the third season. After the third season the show got cancelled on July 24, 2013.

== Timeline of housewives ==
Cast member	Seasons		
Cast member	1	2	3
Reese Gallagher	Main	Main	Main
Veronica Jean	Main	Main	Main
Belen Russo	Main	Main	Main
Dominique Johnson	Main	Main	
Celeste Briars	Main	Main	
Shannon St. John		Main	Main
Lina Taylor		Main	Main
Arden Astor			Main
Lillian Van de Voss			Main
Friends of the housewives
Isabelle St. Clair	Friend	Friend	Friend
Katrina Lyons			Friend
Liz Silva			Friend

== See also ==
- Television in Israel
