= Alex Fridman =

Israeli disability rights activist

- אלכס פרידמן
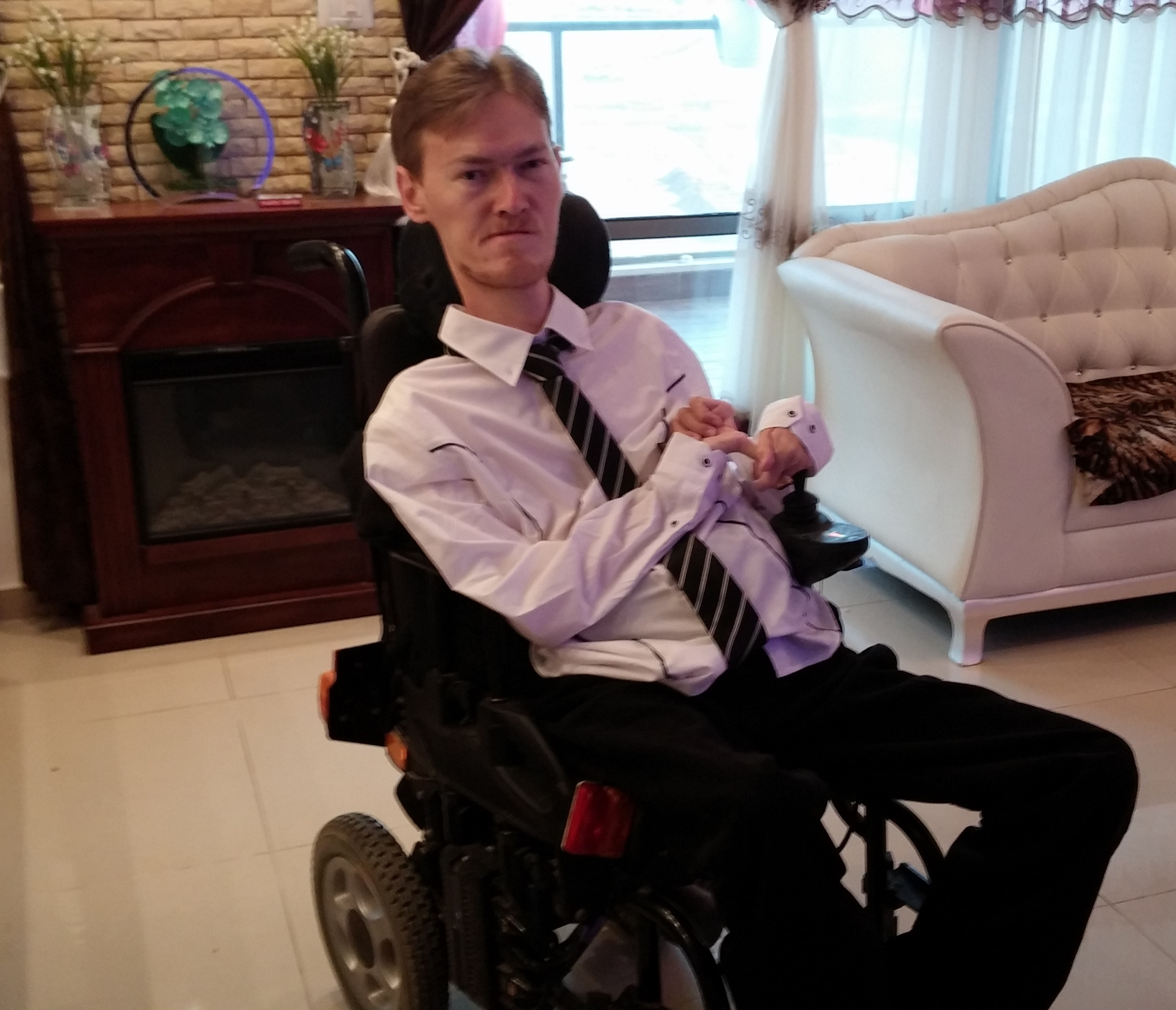
- Alex Fridman, 2015
- Born: April 5, 1988 (age 38); Pinsk, Byelorussian SSR, Soviet Union
- Citizenship: Israel
- Occupation: Screenwriter
- Political party: Likud
- Website: Alex Fridman

Alex Fridman (Hebrew: אלכס פרידמן; born April 5, 1988) is an Israeli disability rights activist, who founded the association Disabled, Not Half a Human Being (Hebrew: נכה, לא חצי בן אדם), which aimed to raise the disability pensions in Israel.

== Early life ==
Fridman was born in Pinsk, Belarus (then part of the Soviet Union). In 1990, at the age of two, he immigrated to Israel with his family. As a child, he had serious health problems, and in 1996 was diagnosed with muscular dystrophy which was SMA type 2. Over the years, it has led to the paralysis of almost his full body. In 2000, due to further deterioration in the medical situation, he was forced to leave the regular educational framework and began to take lessons in his home. In those years, when he was bedridden, he began to study screen writing. In 2011, after two successful works which were published, he was invited to work with the Israeli Viva channel and created the blog novel The Final Trap.

== Social activity ==
=== Establishment of Disabled, Not Half a Human Being ===
In 2015, Fridman began a campaign, under the slogan Disabled, Not Half a Human Being, to raise the disability pension in Israel, one of the lowest in OECD countries. The campaign found support from some celebrities, and led Fridman to initiate a rally in Rabin Square with the participation of dozens of different artists. The campaign went viral.

In December 2015, MK Ilan Gilon proposed a bill for a disability pension at the Minimum Wage level, but the proposal did not pass.

Fridman addressed the chairman of the Knesset, Yuli-Yoel Edelstein and asked him to promote direct negotiations with the Cabinet of Israel. Edelstein mediated between Fridman and his team and Welfare Minister, Haim Katz, CEO of the Ministry of Finance, Shai Babad, CEO of the National Insurance Institute, Shlomo Mor-Yosef, and the Commissioner for Equal Rights for People with Disabilities, Achiya Kamara.

In April 2016, Fridman founded the Disabled, Not Half a Human Being association, which champions a nonpolitical struggle to equalize disability benefits and to promote additional rights for people with disabilities in Israel.

=== Amending the Laron Law ===
In August 2016, following negotiations with the Finance Ministry and a protracted struggle, the government decided to allocate 300 million ILS for the purpose of increasing disability allowances and amending the Laron Law. The move drew criticism among disabled people, who claimed that the discrimination discriminates between those with different degrees of disability and is not significant. Fridman welcomed the move, saying that this indicated a change in the government's approach to the handicaps of disabled people, but expressed reservations about the decision to allocate significantly lower amounts than expected. As a protest, Fridman initiated the Millionaires' Parade, a protest march that took place inside the Azrieli Mall in Tel Aviv, and then blocked the nearby Menachem Begin Junction with other activists.

The cooperation between Fridman and Finance Minister Moshe Kahlon and his team continued in order to promote the establishment of a professional committee to discuss the situation of the disabled in Israel. In December 2016, Fridman met with Yaron Zelekha and convinced him to volunteer for his organization and to provide professional economic advice. A month later, in January 2017, Fridman met with Kahlon, and suggested that Zelekha, who was familiar with the issue of allowances from his past position as the Accountant General, would submit conclusions on the subject. On August 2, 2017, Fridman and his organization together with other disabled people demonstrated outside the home of Bitan, claiming that he had not kept his promise. Fridman's organization held demonstrations, blocking roads throughout the country. In one of them, the demonstrators were prevented from demonstrating at a political conference organized by the prime minister in Ashdod, five protesters arrested, and police reported that demonstrators had taken violence against the police and threatened to set themselves on fire. The demonstrators claimed that the police used unreasonable force. Fridman expressed his condemnation of all violence, especially against the disabled demonstrators.

=== Supreme Court efforts ===
Fridman has also sought to raise disability allowances in the legal arena through a petition to the High Court of Justice against the Knesset and the government, which was submitted in cooperation with the Roof Organization of the disabled (which included some 30 organizations), and retired judges of the District Court, Tzipora Baron and Bracha Ofir-Tom. In response, the Knesset's legal department asked the court to reject the petition because "the disabled did not prove that it was impossible to live off their pension, which stands at 2,342 ILS". On June 18, 2018, chief justice Esther Hayut cancelled the petition in the High Court. She adjudicated that the disability pension had already been raised by legislation, and the petition should be corrected due to this raise.

=== Raising the disability pension ===
On September 5, 2017, the chairman of the Histadrut, Avi Nissenkorn, met with Fridman and representatives of other disability organizations as well as heads of actions and of the big unions, and declared their support for the outline of Professor Zelikha with a budget of 4 billion ILS. On September 28, 2017, Nissenkorn, MKs Ilan Gilon and David Bitan, Avi Simhon, Fridman and several other disabled representatives gathered for a meeting that lasted more than 12 hours, and presented an outline, based on Zelekha's outline, with two significant changes: an addition of 150 million ILS to 50,000 disabled children and a linkage to the average wage in the economy. At the end of the meeting, a compromise agreement was reached within the framework of a budget of 4.2 billion ILS.

After months in which the government delayed the enactment of the agreement, Fridman announced on January 11, 2018, that protests would be renewed. Fridman and 34 leading social organizations signed a letter to Kahlon with the title "Expect net actions", with a requirement to pass the law. On February 12, 2018, the law passed the second and third readings in a budgetary framework of 4.34 billion ILS and entered the law book in Israel. At the end of March 2018, after many protests, the disability pension was raised from 2,342 to 3,272 ILS a month.

In October 2024, Fridman struggled against the will of the minister of finance, Bezalel Smotrich, to freeze the raising of the disability allowances in 2025. The planned freeze has been canceled.

=== Biographic documentary and Knesset aspirations ===
A film about Alex Fridman, displaying the headline: "100% Disability = 2,342 ILS in a month" upon Moshe Kahlon's face, 2018.

In June 2018, three students of Ort Shapira high school in Kfar Saba made a documentary film about Fridman as their matriculation work. The film was directed by May Moran and described Fridman's childhood and advocacy in the Knesset. The film ended by showing the vote in the Knesset in February 2018. Moran was shown towards the end of the film, sitting alongside Fridman in a group photo.

On December 31, 2018, Fridman said that he would run for the twenty-first Knesset. On February 19, 2019, Fridman joined Yisrael Beiteinu as the 12th member in its list of candidates. The party won five seats.

In July 2022 Fridman joined the Likud party and ran to the 25th Knesset elections.

In preparation for the elections to the 26th Knesset, he managed to promote a dedicated slot for people with disabilities, competed in the slot against four candidates, and was placed in the 45th position on the Likud list.

== Awards ==
- Fridman was chosen as one of the people of the year in the social sphere of Yediot Aharonot (2016).
- One of the heroes of the year of Israel Today (2016).
- One of the influential in the economics magazine Liberal (2017).
- Man of the Year in the television program Paula and Leon (2017).
- One of the torchlighters of the Jerusalem Festival of people with Special Needs ("Tzamid") on the occasion of Israel's 70th Independence Day (2018).
- In September 2018, Calcalist chose Fridman among the hundred people who most influenced the world in 2018, stating: "Fridman stood out not only because of his sense of purpose, but because he made the most powerful media of the disabled people – his Facebook page, from which his organization has increased" (2018).
- In October 2018, Fridman was also chosen as one of the most ten influential immigrants from the Soviet Union upon the Israeli society, by the newspaper Vesti (2018).
- On November 1, 2018, in a "Man of the Year 2018" ceremony, which was made by Channel Nine at Gesher Theater in Jaffa, Fridman, who was a candidate of the community benefit, won the prize (2018).
- On December 3, 2018, the United Nations' International Day of Persons with Disabilities, Fridman got a certificate of appreciation from Zvi Gov-Ari, the mayor of Yavne, his city (2018).

== See also ==
- Disability in Israel
