= Welfare in Israel =

Welfare in Israel refers to the series of social welfare schemes in the Israeli government which are administered by the Ministry of Social Affairs and Social Services, and by Israel's national social security agency, Bituah Leumi. All residents of Israel must pay insurance contributions in order to qualify for welfare.

== Welfare spending ==
In 2014, Israel's public welfare expenditure amounted to NIS 86 billion ($22.8 billion).

== Old-age pensions ==
Bituah Leumi runs the state old-age pension system, paid to those who have paid insurance contributions for a minimum of 12 years. The basic old-age pension is NIS 1,531 a month, which rises to NIS 1,617 per month after the pensioner turns 80. A seniority increment is added based on the number of years the pensioner has paid contributions, up to a maximum of 50% of the basic pension. Additional increments are available to those living with spouses who do not qualify for an old-age pension, dependent children, and those who are not entitled to a pension or only a small pension which they must first waive. Income supplements to ensure a minimal standard of living is available to those with no additional sources of income other than the old-age pension. Health insurance contributions are deducted from pensions and any increments and supplements. Salaried employees not covered by collectively-bargained pension plans, though trade unions are legally required to have private pension plans to which employers must contribute to. Most self-employed persons are also legally required to have private pensions.

== Disability pensions ==
Individuals officially recognized as disabled who do not work or whose income is less than 60% of the average wage, as well as homemakers whose ability to perform household tasks has dropped by at least 50% due to disability, are entitled to a disability allowance from Bituah Leumi. The pension rate is determined by the level of disability, with the full pension being NIS 2,342 per month. Those deemed severely disabled to the point where they need constant assistance, or who require constant supervision to prevent a threat to their own lives or lives of others, are entitled to an attendance allowance pension. Individuals injured at work are entitled to allowances for professional rehabilitation to provide professional training and assistance in integrating into the workforce. Families with a disabled child are entitled to a child disability benefit beginning 91 days from the child's birth, up to age 18, though the right to the benefit is examined from time to time. Those on disability pensions are exempt from paying Bituah Leumi contributions.

== Unemployment benefits ==
Unemployment benefits are paid to individuals who lost their jobs and meet the conditions of eligibility. These individuals are registered with the Employment Service Bureau, which attempts to find them suitable work or job training upon losing their jobs. Those who were involuntarily terminated or can provide evidence of having left their jobs for a justified reason receive unemployment benefits immediately, while those deemed to have left their jobs for no justified reason start receiving unemployment benefits only 90 days after they register. Those who did not immediately register with the Employment Service Bureau are not jeopardized in their eligibility for unemployment benefits. The Employment Service Bureau regularly attempts to find work or job training during the unemployment period, and regularly reporting to the Employment Service Bureau is a condition for continuing to receive unemployment benefits. A person who was offered suitable work or training by the Employment Service Bureau but refused will only receive unemployment benefits 90 days after the date of the refusal, and 30 days' worth of unemployment benefits will be deducted for each subsequent refusal. Unemployment benefits are paid daily, with the amount calculated based on the employee's previous income over the past six months, but not exceeding the daily average wage for the first 125 days of payment and two-thirds of the daily average wage from the 126th day onward.

== Income support ==
Income support benefits are paid to households who are unable to support themselves on their own. The benefit is paid to those who reported to the Employment Service Bureau for work, but to whom no job or only a low-wage job is offered, those deemed incapable of working, children orphaned or abandoned by both parents, and those waiting for a decision on their claims to a disability pension provided certain conditions are met. The full income support benefit is paid to those who are not capable of earning income from work and not eligible for other programs, while income supplements are paid to those whose income, either from work or other sources, is lower than the minimum income required for subsistence.
