= Communication assistance in Israel =

The international symbol of hearing loss

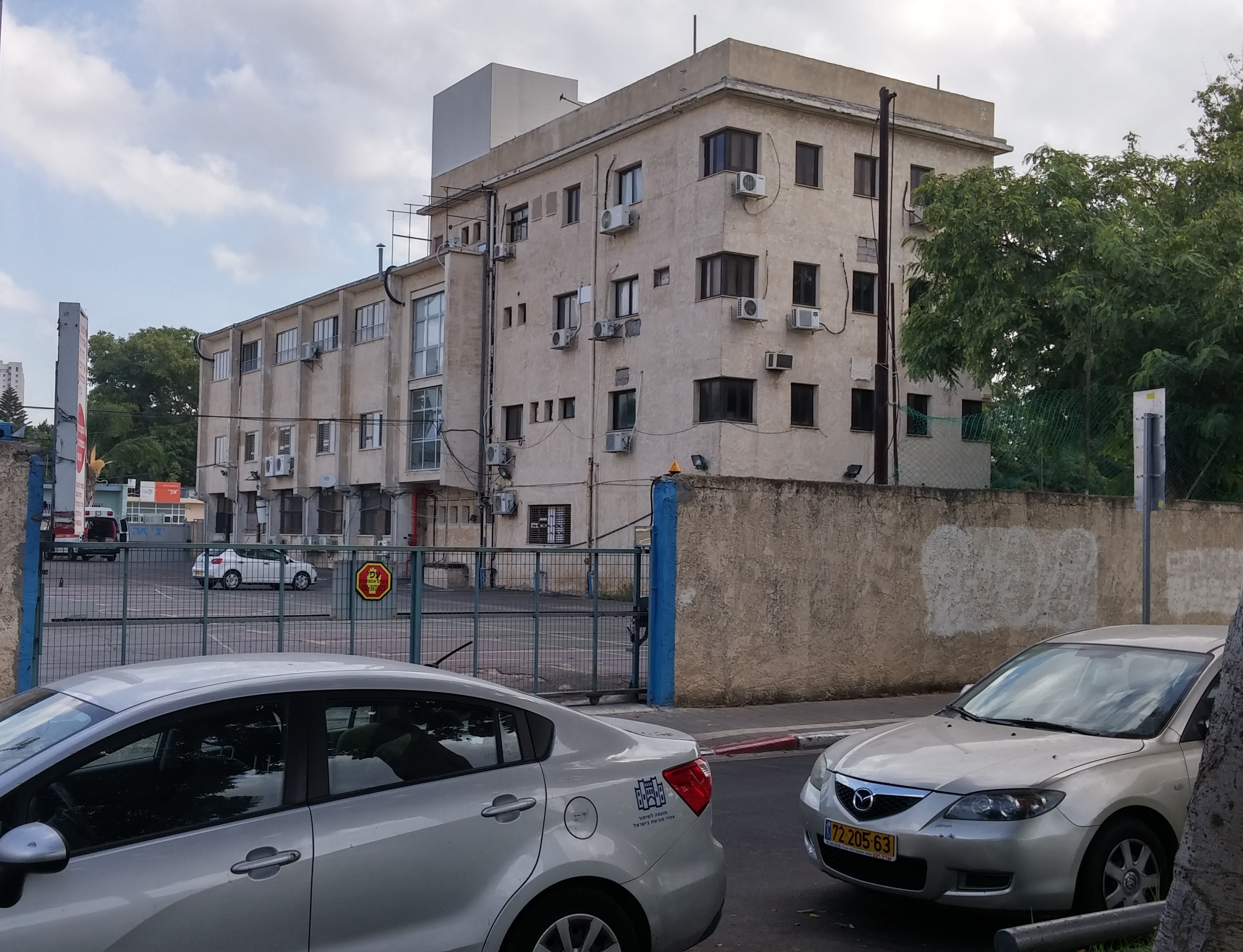
Helen Keller House in Tel Aviv, the place of Acha, 2016

Communication assistance in Israel (Hebrew: סל תקשורת, Sal Tikshoret, lit. "Communication Basket"), is supplied to the Deaf and Hard of Hearing community in Israel by the Ministry of Social Affairs and Social Services (Molsa), after the demonstrations of The Association of the Deaf in Israel (Acha), which were held from May 5, 2002 until June 12, 2002.

== History ==
In the winter of 2002, the Disabled people in Israel demanded a higher Disability allowance, and demonstrated in front of the Israeli Government. After 78 days, they reached an agreement which was made by Avigdor Yitzhaki, the CEO of the Prime Minister's Office.

Following the model of the Disabled people's strike which ended, the chairman of Acha Aharon Eini launched on May 5, 2002, a struggle whose headline was "A Deaf Government", for improving the conditions of the Deaf people in Israel. He did it after months of talks with the National Insurance Institute and Molsa, which resulted nothing.

Eini also published a full list of the demands of the Israeli Deaf people, which included among the rest:

1. A communication assistance with purchasing accessories modified for Deaf people, like a flashing doorbell, a vibrating alarm clock, an Infant crying detector.
2. Interpretation by sign language and subtitles in news programs during reasonable viewing hours (operated in 2018 by Closed captioning).
3. Increasing of Israeli sign language interpretation hours from 16 hours to 50 hours during a year for every Deaf person.
4. Deaf people received only 630 ILS from their Health maintenance organizations when they purchased hearing aids, whose cost was 4,000 ILS. A full Assistance is requested.
5. Supplying interpretation in job interviews, work meetings and firing in the work place of the Deaf person.
6. A full interpretation for the Deaf students in the universities.
7. Recognition of Israeli sign language as an official language in Israel, alongside Hebrew and Arabic.
8. Supplying Israeli Telecommunications relay services for Deaf people (operated since summer 2009 by Israeli telecommunication regulations).
9. Assistance with operating of Deaf clubs in Israel.
10. Additional Earned income tax credits to Deaf workers.
11. Voiding the annual governmental radio fee in vehicles of Deaf people.
12. A professional mental treatment for Deaf people, including sign language mastering.

On May 13, 2002, there was a discussion in the Knesset about the demonstration of the Deaf people at the government quarters. MK Ilan Gilon talked without his sound, but moved his lips, for demonstrating the situation of the Deaf people. MK Ophir Pines-Paz said that the requests of the Deaf people were basic and stable, but their representatives were tricked. MK Mohammad Barakeh said that the Deaf people had to pay an annual governmental radio fee in their cars, although they did not hear it. Like Pines, he said that their demands were basic, trivial and banal. Other MKs said similar words, and MK Muhamad Kanan talked about 70% of unemployment among the Deaf people. Nissim Dahan the Minister of Health agreed with the speeches, although he represented the government, and other MKs told him it. At the end of the discussion, there was a vote of 19 supporters and without opponents, to move the issue to the committee of the work and welfare.

On May 21, 2002, there was a meeting between Eini and the Treasury, which lasted until the wee hours of the night. Eini requested 50 million ILS per year, and the Treasury agreed up to 9 million ILS. On June 9, 2002, Eini said that the Treasury suggested 20–22 million ILS, and the requests of the Deaf people remained 40–55 million ILS. The Treasury suggested a monthly allowance of 300 ILS to every Deaf person, plus 1,500 ILS every four years for purchasing a communications equipment, but Eini did not accept these 1,500 ILS.

The Hard of hearing (Hoh) people did not assist the demonstration, and Gali Beiner, a member of Bekol, an Israeli organization of Hoh people, wrote about it. After the demonstration was ended, the Hoh with hearing loss of 70 db and down, demanded their rights as well, although the major part of them did not know sign language. They demanded from Acha to handle them, although they were not members of Acha.

== Kind of assistance ==
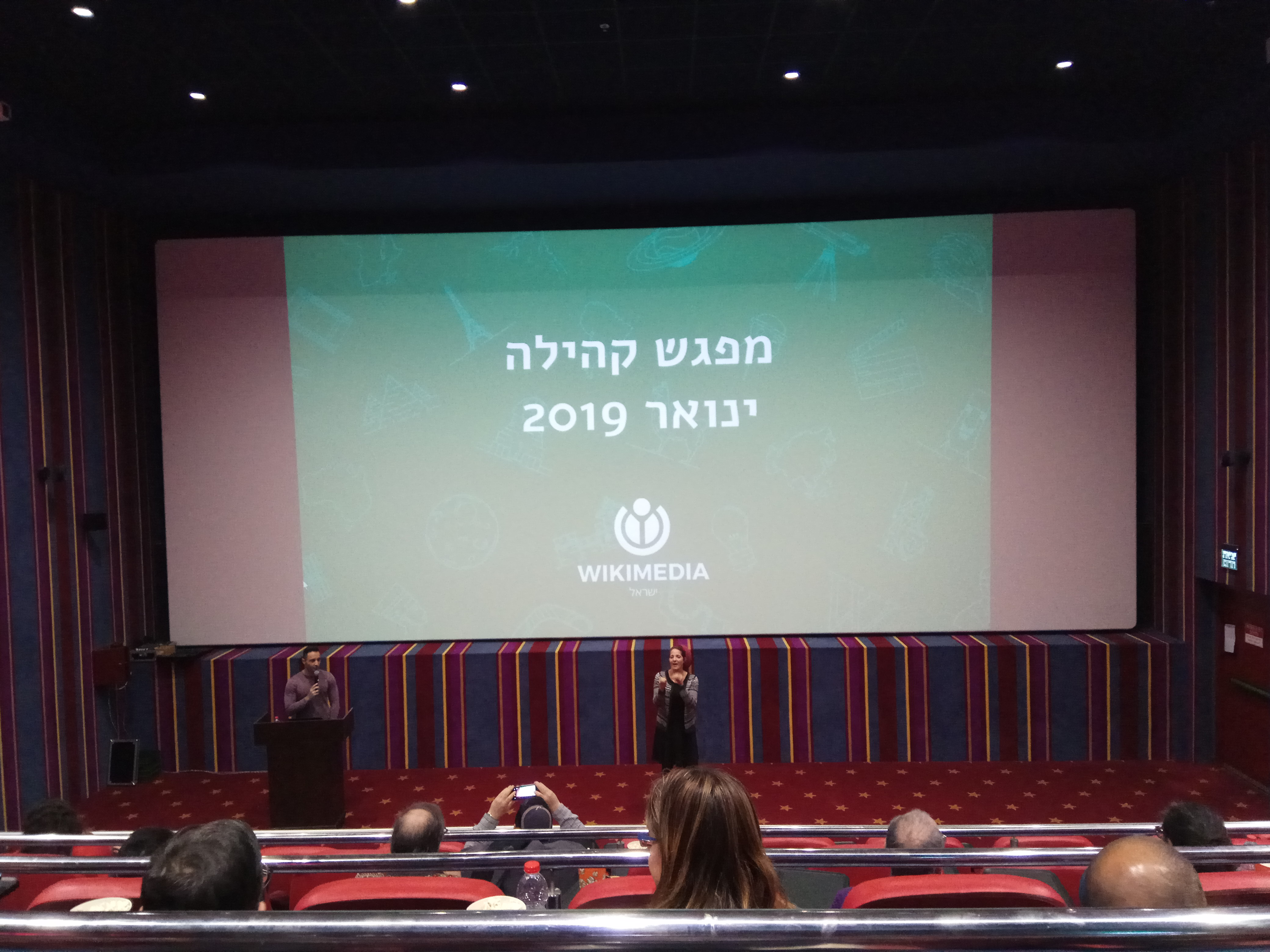
Interpretation to the Israeli Sign Language in the meeting of the Hebrew Wikipedia in the Cinema City, Jerusalem, January 11, 2019

On June 12, 2002, Eini signed an agreement which was written by the head of the Budget Division Ori Yogev, and was signed by him and by the Minister of Finance Silvan Shalom as well.

Its main clauses were:

1. Assistance would be given to a Deaf or Hoh person who lost his hearing up to the age of three years, and the hearing loss is at least 70 Decibels in the better ear.
2. 45 hours of Israeli sign language interpretation for every Deaf or Hoh person. Hoh is eligible to replace interpretation with transcription.
3. 288 ILS per month as a communication allowance for a Deaf worker, and 260 ILS for a Deaf non-worker.
4. Buying communication assistance up to 3,000 ILS for 4 years. This assistance is paid by supplying receipts.
5. The sums are linked to the consumer price index and are updated each year.
6. Elderly Deaf people were eligible for 25% of these sums. This clause was voided in March 2018 by Molsa.
7. An addition of 300,000 ILS in 2002 from Molsa for running Israeli Deaf clubs by Acha.
8. The Minister of Finance would not object a legislative proposal, which exempts Deaf people from paying the annual radio fee in their vehicles.

The agreement was recorded as Social Work Regulations 5.7 in Molsa. This kind of the regulations is signed by the CEO of Molsa instead of its Minister.

== Violations of the agreement ==
In 2009 Ester Goldblat, a manager at the Department of Rehabilitation in Molsa, made an interpretation survey by sending questionnaires to Israeli sign language interpreters, and repeated it on May 18, 2012, by sending questionnaires to Deaf and Hoh people, asking them about their interpretation services. On June 13, 2012, Goldblat requested Deaf and Hoh people to answer a survey about their vibrating pagers, which they received from the Home Front Command, in order to alert them in cases of war alarms.

Goldblat also prohibited a Deaf person to invite an interpreter for making a phone call, and forced the interpreter to tell her the email address of the Deaf person, instead of sending a letter to this person. When the person asked Molsa about this prohibition, Molsa replied that the specific interpreter reported excessive hours, in spite of the Deaf person signs the interpretation form and writes also the interpreting hours.

At the end of 2012, the Institute for the Advancement of Deaf Persons in Israel received a notice from Molsa about cutting interpretation hours of Deaf people in 2013. Interpretation to Deaf people would be given by the following order: Health care, Education, Welfare, Employment, Culture and Leisure. Molsa instructed the institute to stop interpretations for Culture and Leisure. As a result, on December 30, 2012, there was a demonstration in Tel Aviv of about 250 Deaf people against the government. In the demonstration participated Shai Piron, MK Dov Khenin, Stav Shaffir, Karin Elharar, and Yehuda Doron.

On August 26, 2018, Orly Guetta from Molsa requested an Israeli Deaf person to explain the Social Work Regulations 5.7 to her. Then, on September 5, 2018, Goldblat denied a refund of 17% VAT from this Deaf person, who purchased a Xiaomi smartphone from China by eBay, although the Deaf person in question did not live in Eilat, and paid the VAT legally to the Israel Tax Authority. This person wrote to Haim Katz the Minister of Welfare, but did not get a reply for about two months.

== See also ==
- Deaf rights movement
