= Andy Xie =

American economist

- Born: 1960 (age 65–66); Shanghai, China
- Education: Massachusetts Institute of Technology
- Occupation: Businessman

Andy Xie (Chinese: 谢国忠; pinyin: Xiè Guózhōng; born 1960) is an independent economist based in Shanghai, and the former Morgan Stanley star chief Asia-Pacific economist famous for his contrarian and provocative views. He left Morgan Stanley abruptly in October 2006 when an internal email that he penned was leaked. He derided Singapore as a money laundering centre for Indonesia, and the ASEAN group of nations as a failure.

== Career ==
Xie graduated from the Massachusetts Institute of Technology with a M.S. in civil engineering. He then obtained a PhD in economics from that institution in 1990 and went on to become an economist for the International Monetary Fund, specializing in South-east Asian economies. He joined Morgan Stanley in 1997 as a managing director, and is noted for his provocative views on the Chinese economy. His bearish calls on Shanghai property and Chinese stock market have attracted criticism from Chinese officials and retail investors. In China, some local government economists criticized his bearish calls on Chinese Asset Bubble-Burst Cycle and questioned his personality, claiming him as an "American Parrot".

Xie is one of the few economists who accurately predicted economic bubbles including the 1997 Asian financial crisis, dot-com bubble (1999) and Subprime mortgage crisis (2008). Xie considers himself as one who has had a reasonably good record at calling bubbles in the past. "I wrote my doctoral thesis arguing that Japan was a bubble in late 1980s, a long report at the World Bank in the early 1990s arguing that Southeast Asia was a bubble, research notes at Morgan Stanley in 1999 calling dotcom boom a bubble, and numerous research notes from 2003 onwards arguing that the U.S. property market was a bubble. On the other hand I have never called something a bubble that turned out not to be a bubble."

== Views ==
Xie's economic views are influenced by the Austrian School.

Xie considers FED monetary policy is the base of international capital flow. Whenever there is a loose Fed monetary policy, cheap credits flow to developing countries and create economic bubbles.

Xie described the Chinese economy as a "Panda Economy", which is named after "Kung Fu Panda"—a popular Hollywood cartoon movie. He argued that the Chinese economy was not as "nice and juicy" as most people thought and that even China has enough space to adjust its political and economic policies to boost its economy only if it decides to reform the income distribution system and stir consumer demand. However, the real estate bubble might kill consumer demand in China. He also criticized economic policy makers across the world as being guilty of replacing an old bubble with a new bubble without real structural reform. He warned that if no structural reform is initiated, the world economy will go back to a 1970s era of stagflation. Xie coined the term "Panda Put", in reference to the popular phrase "Greenspan put", to describe the situation where investors in China believe that the government will not allow the stock market to go down before important dates in the Chinese calendar, like the 60th anniversary of the PRC or the 17th Party Congress.

Xie believes that to keep China from being an export dependent economy, the PRC government will need to redistribute the wealth to its citizens. It can do so via distributing shares of the State-owned companies (SoE) to its citizens and lowering housing costs.

Xie has suggested that to cool property speculation in China caused by excess surplus liquidity, the central government can consider imposing an 80% capital gains tax on property flipping, decreasing 10% each year afterwards.

Xie commented in 2009 that Japan's low birth rate (1.4%) is partially due to the real estate bubble in the 1980s where China currently is following in the same track. Chinese land policy and short term government behaviors provide the perfect ground for a semi-permanent property bubble. An economic crisis similar to the Great Depression might happen in China within 20 years from 2009, so 2029, when Chinese baby boomers (born between 1950 and 1978) start to retire.

== Important calls ==
In 2003, Xie warned that China needed to free up capital markets to avoid losing potential economic growth

On 14 August 2008, Xie released his post "Apocalypse Soon" (末日启示录) on his blog, detailing how the entire U.S. financial system would soon unravel. On 15 September 2008, Lehman Brothers filed Chapter 11 Bankruptcy, and Merrill Lynch was sold to Bank of America in a shot-gun deal.

On 11 April 2009, Xie wrote on his blog that a bear market rally was underway. He suggested that stimulus, inventory cycle and capex spending would provide tailwind for the rally. He also wrote that a second dip would occur in 2010. As of 26 August 2009, the S&P 500 has risen 20.0% to 1028 from 858 on 13 April 2009.

On 4 May 2009, Xie wrote in the Financial Times that if China loses faith in the U.S. dollar, the dollar will collapse. Commenting on United States' exploding deficit, Xie said that "Any other country with America's problems would need the Paris Club of creditor nations to negotiate with its lenders on its monetary and fiscal policies to protect their interests". "America's policy is pushing China towards developing an alternative financial system. China is aware that it must become independent from the dollar at some point. Its recent decision to turn Shanghai into a financial centre by 2020 reflects China's anxiety over relying on the dollar system."

On 3 August 2009, Xie wrote that "Chinese asset markets have become a giant Ponzi scheme". He wrote "I want to make myself perfectly clear on China's asset markets today. They are a big bubble. Its bursting will bring very bad consequences for the country."

== Controversy ==
Xie's had been issued bearish calls on Shanghai real estate market since 2004 while the real estate price in Shanghai had been up more than 300% since then. Xie explained that there was bubble in the real estate market but the bubble might not burst.

Xie's bearish calls brought broad criticisms from local Chinese "Pundits" and domestic retail investors. These local Chinese "pundits" include scholars from universities, local governments and investment advisers. Some Chinese "Pundits" claim that there is no bubble in the Chinese asset market and high P/E is an indication of strong future growth of the Chinese economy. Some suggest that the Chinese asset market is deeply undervalued and return on equity (ROE) analysis is not applicable in China.
