= Lev Tel Aviv =

Neighborhood in central Tel Aviv, Israel

Lev Tel Aviv לב תל אביב
- Neighborhood of Tel Aviv
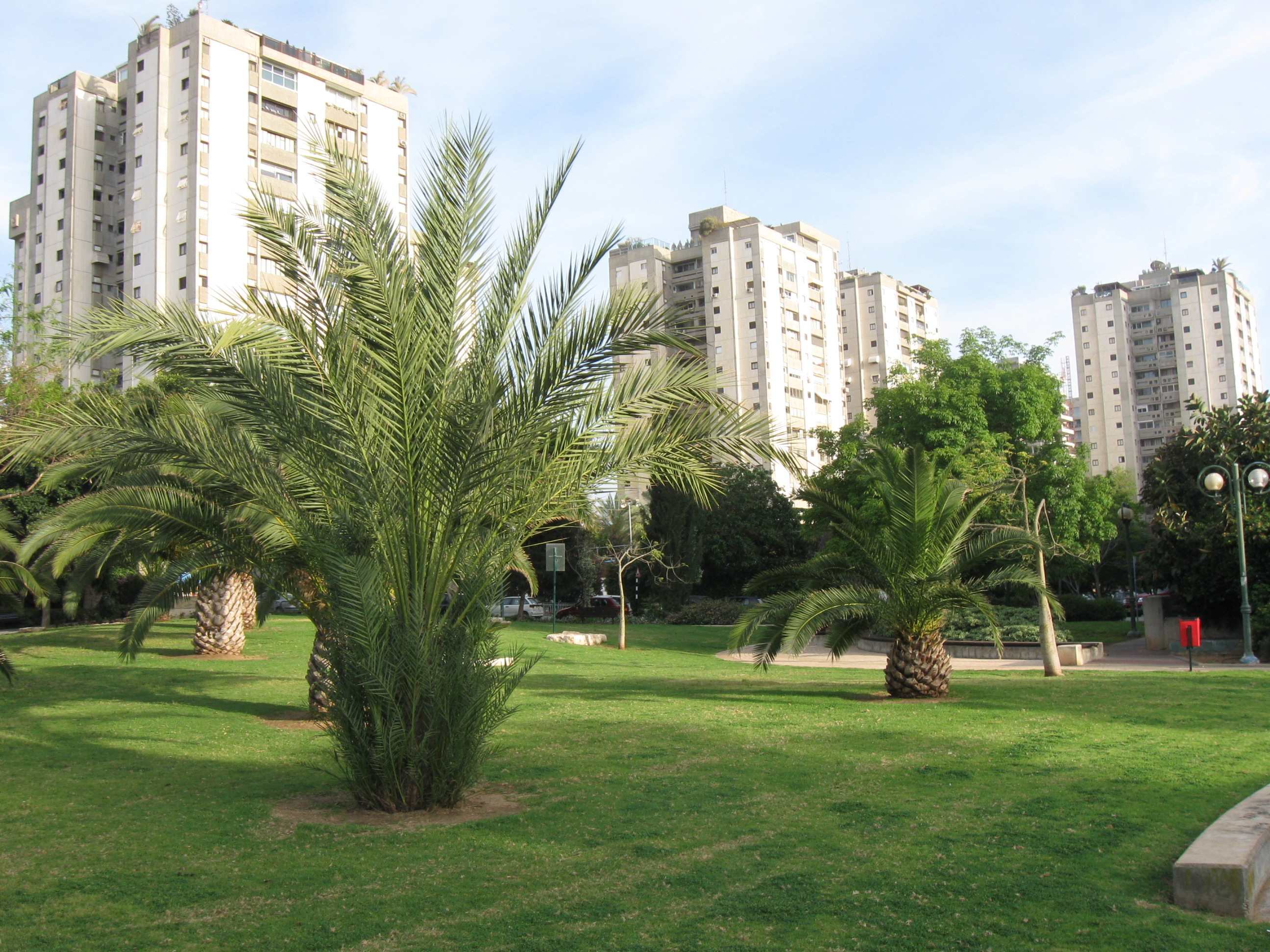
- Interactive map of Lev Tel Aviv
- Country: Israel
- City: Tel Aviv
- Established: 1920s

Lev Tel Aviv (Hebrew: לב תל אביב, lit. 'Heart of Tel Aviv'), also known as Lev HaIr (Hebrew: לב העיר, lit. 'Heart of the city'), is a neighborhood in the Israeli city of Tel Aviv. The neighborhood is famous for encompassing a large part of the White City, and is bound by King George Street to the west, Ben Zion Boulevard to the north, Begin Road to the east, and Jaffa to the south.
