= 2002–2003 Chinese protest movement =

Series of protests in China

The 2002–2003 Chinese protest movement included general strikes, occupations, strike actions, riots, wildcat strikes and picketing in China’s poorer areas against the division between rich and poor, unemployment, poverty, poor living standards and inequality. Mass protests began as early as January–February 2002, when a tide of protests swept Changping and Tibet. People from all ages, cultures and areas nationwide all came out onto the streets, protesting the government's closures of factories, corruption, low wages and unemployment among young and old people and many more deep issues. Labour protests swept Sichuan, Tibet, Shenyang and Tianjin. The demonstrators were protesting the government crackdown on protests in Liaoyang in 2002, when 30,000 protesters took to the streets protesting the closure of a brick factory for three months; it was the biggest labour uprising since 1976. Protester tactics were nonviolent boycotts, civil disobedience and marches, while the police's tactics were tear gas, detention and live ammunition. In 2004 in Sichuan, mass protests against the treatment of workers and civilians in slums occurred by 25,000 pensioners and students. One was killed in a crackdown on public protests in October 2004 there. In the early months of 2003, labour unrest and wildcat strikes rocked Shenyang by workers in sit-ins against unemployment and poverty. Police would arrest, detain and fire on demonstrators. The protests led to the death of one demonstrator.

== See also ==
- 1989 Tiananmen Square protests and massacre
- 2010 Chinese labour unrest
- 2022 COVID-19 protests in China
