= Disabled, Not Half a Human Being =

- נכה, לא חצי בן אדם
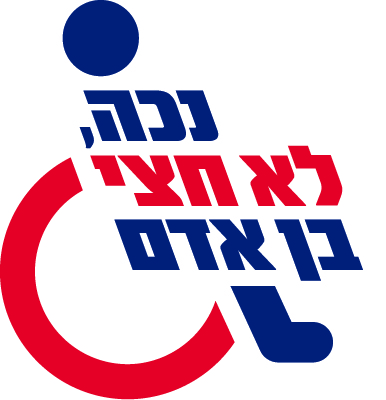
- Logo of the "Disabled, Not Half a Human Being" organization
- Headquarters: Yavne
- Location: Israel
- Staff: Alex Fridman; Hanan Tal; Amit Halamish

Disabled, Not Half a Human Being (Hebrew: נכה, לא חצי בן אדם) is an Israeli non-governmental organization (a voluntary association) which works for the rights of people with disabilities in the State of Israel. Its main goals are raising the general disability allowance and equalizing it to the minimum wage, advancing the issue of accessibility, advancing the right to housing for disabled people, nursing, proper medical treatment and integration of people with disabilities into society and employment.

== History ==
A film about Alex Fridman, displaying the headline: "100% Disability = 2,342 ILS in a month" upon Moshe Kahlon's face, 2018.

The organization was established in April 2016, as a part of a national campaign whose name was "Disabled, Not Half a Human Being", which had begun in January 2015, as a protest against the wear of the disability pension in Israel for more than 15 years. It raised the disability pension in Israel from NIS 2,342 ($660) to NIS 4,500 ($1,270).

The association is a member of several social forums as "The Forum for the Struggle Against Poverty", "The Forum for the health advancement of people with disabilities", and the national committee for advancing the rights of people with disabilities in the Israel Bar Association.

=== Founders ===
In January 2015 Fridman decided to establish the association after hearing about a woman with a disability who tried to commit suicide as a result of her economic distress, and began a strategic campaign under the slogan "Disabled, Not Half a Human Being" to raise the Disability pension in Israel.

The founders are the chairman of the association Alex Fridman, a wheelchair-using man who has a muscular dystrophy which is SMA, a social networking screenwriter, and the CEO Hanan Tal, a social activist with no disability, who has been funded the organization and the campaign, and volunteers as the CEO from the very beginning. Hanan Tal works as a commercial diver and a director at the Europe Asia Pipeline Company for the last 15 years.

The other founders are Advocate Amit Halamish, and Head of Research Asher Rochberger.

=== Activities of the Association ===
- Online social networking activity (as of March 2018 – the Facebook page of the association has 70,000 followers).
- Conducting shows and conferences with the participation of Public opinion leaders.
- Lectures in educational institutions.
- Lobbying and legislation in the Israeli Knesset.
- Individual counseling and assistance for people with disabilities.
- On September 4, 2017, Semion Grafman appeared in a video clip with Fridman and Tal. In this clip, Grafman and Tal got whole dishes, but Fridman was served with half of a fish and half of a beer glass. When Grafman asked where the restaurant's owner was, the waiter replied that it was not related to the place, but was the policy of Israel government.

== See also ==
- Disability
