= Nicol Raidman =

Israeli philanthropist

Nicol Raidman ניקול ראידמן
- Born: Nicol Krotyansky; 11 June 1986 (age 39); Odesa, Ukrainian SSR, USSR
- Genres: Pop
- Occupations: Singer, Businesswoman, Model
- Instrument: Saxophone
- Years active: 2011–present

Nicol Raidman (Hebrew: ניקול ראידמן, Ukrainian: Ніколь Райдман; 11 June 1986) is a USSR-born Israeli figure, businesswoman and philanthropist's wife. She participated in two seasons of the Israeli reality show Me'usharot, Israel's answer to The Real Housewives franchise.

Born Nicol Krotyansky in Odesa, Ukrainian SSR, USSR to Victoria and Igor Krotyansky. Her father is a businessman, and her mother is a musician who ran the Conservatory in Ukraine and the "Tower of Light (theatre)", a Yiddish musical theater in Odesa. Nicol herself learned to play the saxophone in her youth.

In 1996, ten-year-old Raidman and her family emigrated to Israel. She worked as a salesperson in a toy shop. At the end of high school, she enrolled in communications and international relations at the Open University while working as a makeup artist and a production assistant.

In 2011 she opened a luxury clothing store, "Madame de Pompadour", in Tel Aviv. In April 2013, she launched a perfume bearing the name of the store and sold exclusively duty-free. In 2018, the store was closed.

In 2019 she launched her singing career. Aki Avni appears as her love interest in two music videos.

In September 2013, she filed a lawsuit against the "Clean Core Technologies" company that carried out fire damage repair work at her home in Herzliya. The lawsuit was for NIS 3.6 million. .

== Personal life ==
Raidman was married to the entrepreneur, Michael Cherney. They have two children together, Michelle and Richard. They parted in mid 2019.

She is close friends with Sara Netanyahu, wife of Israeli politician, Benjamin Netanyahu.

In July 2025, a grenade was thrown into the premises of her home in Herzliya Pituah and landed in the pool, causing no damage. Raidman does not believe that the perpetrator had intentionally targeted her.

== Philanthropy ==
In 2014, during Operation Protective Edge, she donated NIS 300,000 to immediately buy protective vests for combat Israeli soldiers, and another NIS 200,000 to buy food and clothing for soldiers.
