= Disability in Israel =

About a fifth of Israel's population is affected by disability. The country is a state party of the UN Convention on the Rights of Persons with Disabilities. There is a system of legislation and policies that protect the rights of disabled Israelis.

== Demographics ==
In 2019, people with disabilities were 17% of the population of Israel. Adults from 18 to 64 years constituted 50% of the total, adults 65 years and older were 33%, and children 0–17 years old made up 17%. About 6% of working-age (20-64) people had significant difficulty with activities of daily living while some 10% had moderate disability.

== Disability rights ==
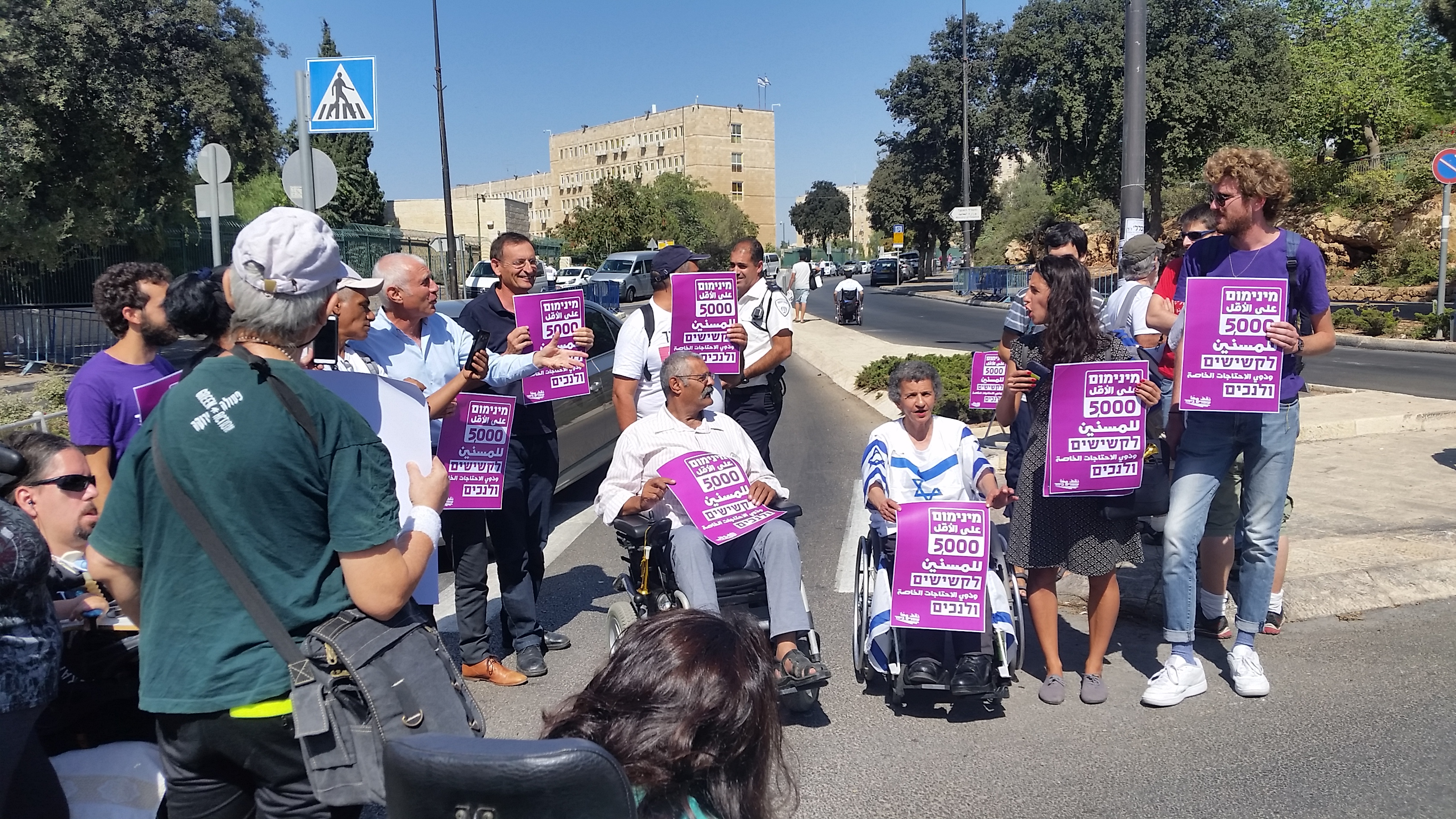
Demonstration and blocking of the road near the Knesset building with Member of Knesset Dov Khenin, Jerusalem, September 2017.

== Legislation and policy ==
Israel signed the United Nations Convention on the Rights of Persons with Disabilities on 30 March 2007 and ratified it on 28 September 2012.

The Equal Rights for Persons with Disabilities Law of 1998 was enacted to change previous welfare oriented legislation and social policies to a rights based regime in line with the social model of disability. The intent is to change the attitude towards people with disabilities and reducing the socioeconomic gaps between them and the rest of the population in the various spheres of life. This law and others also regulate disability pensions, accessibility, therapy, special education, sheltered workshops and assisted living. The Commission for Equal Rights of Persons with Disabilities was created in 2000 under the Ministry of Justice to oversee, promote and enforce disability rights legislation and policy.

== Activism ==
Since the beginning of the 21st century, disabled people in Israel, with a population of 250,000, have managed to equalize the disability pension from the Bituah Leumi (National Insurance Institute of Israel) to the minimum wage level in Israel. In 2017, activists protested the low disability pension by demonstrations, blocking main roads, highways and industries, activity in social networking services, petitions to the High Court of Justice, negotiations with the Government of Israel and bills in the Knesset.

In 2017, a full disability pension was 2,342 ILS. The minimum wage in this year was 5,000 ILS, and in December 2017 it went up to 5,300 ILS per month.

== Sport ==
Israeli athletes have participated in every Summer Paralympic Games since 1960 and hosted the 1968 Paralympics in Tel Aviv. As of 2021 Israel have never participated in the Winter Paralympics.

== See also ==
- Communication assistance in Israel
