= Avri Gilad =

Israeli media personality (born 1962)

- אברי גלעד
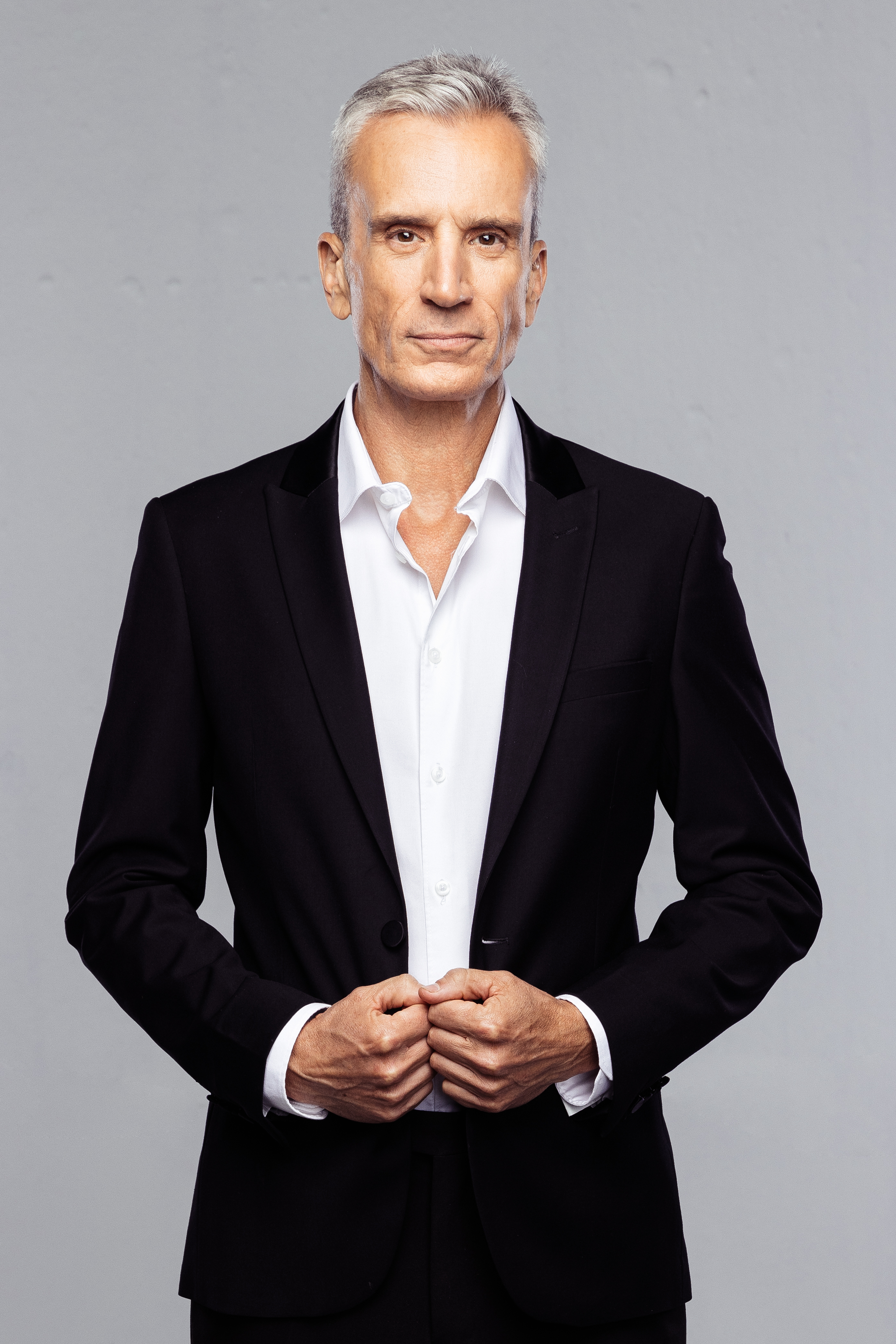
- Gilad in 2021
- Born: Avraham Kwastler

Avri Gilad (Hebrew: אברי גלעד) is an Israeli media personality.

Avraham Kwastler (later "Avri Gilad") started his professional career in the mid-1980s as a host on Israel Defense Forces Radio. He has hosted many television game shows, including 1 vs 100.

Gilad was listed among the top-ten TV earners in a 2009 list compiled by Yedioth Ahronoth, with a stated income of $340,000 per season, apart from his earnings as a spokesman for the Mega Bool supermarket chain and royalties for a game show he developed, The Bubble, a news quiz broadcast in Israel, the UK, and other countries.

On his blog, Gilad has written about the problems of being a celebrity and his spiritual interests. He is a devotee of the "Yemima Method", a psychological self-help method developed by Yemima Avital.
