= Timeline of Saddam Hussein and al-Qaeda link allegations =

This article is a chronological listing of allegations of meetings between members of al-Qaeda and members of Saddam Hussein's government, as well as other information relevant to conspiracy theories involving Saddam Hussein and al-Qaeda.

== Skepticism ==
In 2003, American terrorism analyst Evan Kohlman said in an interview:

While there have been a number of promising intelligence leads hinting at possible meetings between al-Qaeda members and elements of the former Baghdad regime, nothing has been yet shown demonstrating that these potential contacts were historically any more significant than the same level of communication maintained between Osama bin Laden and ruling elements in a number of Iraq's Persian Gulf neighbors, including Saudi Arabia, Iran, Yemen, Qatar, and Kuwait.

In 2006, a report of postwar findings by the United States Senate Select Committee on Intelligence concluded that:

Postwar findings have identified only one meeting between representatives of al-Qa'ida and Saddam Hussein's regime reported in prewar intelligence assessments. Postwar findings have identified two occasions, not reported prior to the war, in which Saddam Hussein rebuffed meeting requests from an al-Qa'ida operative. The Intelligence Community has not found any other evidence of meetings between al'Qa'ida and Iraq.

The same report also concluded that:

Saddam Hussein was distrustful of al-Qaeda and viewed Islamic extremists as a threat to his regime, refusing all requests from al-Qaeda to provide material or operational support.

The result of the publication of the Senate report was the belief that the entire connection between Saddam Hussein and al-Qaeda was an official deception based on cherry picking specific intelligence data that bolstered the case for war with Iraq regardless of its reliability. One instance of this reaction was reported in a BBC news article, which stated:

Opposition Democrats are accusing the White House of deliberate deception. They say the revelation undermines the basis on which the US went to war in Iraq.

== Gulf War ==
=== 1988 ===
According to the sworn testimony of al-Qaeda member Mohamed Rashed Daoud Al-Owhali in 2001, Osama bin Laden delivered a lecture in Pakistan in 1988, during which he spoke against Saddam Hussein and the Ba'ath party and warned his listeners about Saddam's expansionist ambitions in the Middle East.

=== 1990 ===
==== Circa February, Mecca ====
Khalid Batarfi, an old friend of Osama bin Laden, claimed in a 2005 interview with Peter Bergen that bin Laden had already predicted Saddam's invasion of Kuwait by 1990 and had begun preparations for war against Saddam. According to Batarfi, bin Laden said, "We should train our people, our young and increase our army and prepare for the day when eventually we are attacked. This guy [Saddam] can never be trusted." Batarfi himself went on to say that bin Laden "doesn't believe [Saddam] is a Muslim. So he never liked him nor trusted him."

==== 2 August, Kuwait ====
The Iraqi Army invaded Kuwait, beginning the Gulf War. In response to the perceived threat to Saudi Arabia, Osama bin Laden offered to bring an army of jihadist fighters to protect the kingdom against Saddam, but the Saudi royal family opted instead to seek help from America. The presence of American troops on the Arabian peninsula after the end of the Gulf War became, for bin Laden, a key piece of evidence that the US was at war with Islam. Prince Turki bin Faisal Al Saud, the former head of the Saudi intelligence agency Al Mukhabarat Al A'amah, noted of bin Laden: "I saw radical changes in his personality as he changed from a calm, peaceful and gentle man interested in helping Muslims into a person who believed that he would be able to amass and command an army to liberate Kuwait. It revealed his arrogance."

While bin Laden continued to oppose Saddam's Baathist government, he was also vocal in criticizing the UN sanctions against Iraq. Bin Laden's bodyguard recalled that his intentions included not only the liberation of Kuwait but also "rescuing the Iraqi people from the domination of the Ba'th Party."

=== 1992 ===
According to information that was first made public in the Feith memo, Hassan al-Turabi arranged a meeting between members of the Iraqi Intelligence Service and members of al-Qaeda, allegedly to create a common strategy for deposing pro-Western Arab governments. According to Lawrence Wright in The Looming Tower:

The Iraqi delegation met with bin Laden and flattered him, claiming that he was the prophesied Mahdi, the savior of Islam. They wanted him to stop backing anti-Saddam insurgents. Bin Laden agreed, but in return he asked for weapons and training camps inside Iraq. That same year, Zawahiri traveled to Baghdad, where he met the Iraqi dictator in person. But there is no evidence that Iraq ever supplied al-Qaeda with weapons or camps, and soon bin Laden resumed his support of Iraqi dissidents."

=== 1993 ===
==== 13 March ====
Having been questioned and released by the FBI for purported involvement in the 1993 World Trade Center bombing, Abdul Rahman Yasin boarded a flight to Amman and continued on to Baghdad, where he allegedly moved in with a relative and received support from the Iraqi government. The Iraqi government claimed it imprisoned Yasin in 1994 until at least 2002. Iraq reportedly made an offer to the Clinton administration to trade Yasin in 1998, which the administration rejected. The Iraqis purportedly made a similar offer to the Bush administration in 2003, also rejected.

An anonymous intelligence official claimed that Iraq required the US to sign a statement discussing Yasin's whereabouts that was at odds with the US's "version of the facts." Former Iraqi foreign minister Tariq Aziz, however, claimed that the offers were made without conditions. The same intelligence official stated that the Iraqis wanted the US to "sign a lengthy document that included information about Yasin's whereabouts since 1993, and how they had tried to turn him over. "We refused to sign," said the official, "Because we believe their version was inaccurate." The US, he said, offered to sign a simple receipt acknowledging that the Iraqis had turned Yasin over to us. But they did not respond."

Neil Herman, who headed the Federal Bureau of Investigation (FBI) investigation into the 1993 World Trade Center attack, noted that despite Yasin's presence in Baghdad, there was no evidence of Iraqi support for the attack. "We looked at that rather extensively," he told CNN terrorism analyst Peter Bergen. "There were no ties to the Iraqi government." Bergen wrote:

In sum, by the mid-'90s, the Joint Terrorism Task Force in New York, the F.B.I., the U.S. Attorney's office in the Southern District of New York, the C.I.A., the N.S.C., and the State Department had all found no evidence implicating the Iraqi government in the first Trade Center attack.

During the 9/11 Commission hearings, former US counter-terrorism chief Richard A. Clarke was asked about whether Yasin going to Iraq established a connection between Saddam Hussein and the 1993 World Trade Center attack. His response was unequivocating:

But the investigation, both the CIA investigation and the FBI investigation, made it very clear in '95 and '96 as they got more information, that the Iraqi government was in no way involved in the attack. And the fact that one of the 12 people involved in the attack was Iraqi hardly seems to me as evidence that the Iraqi government was involved in the attack. The attack was al-Qaida; not Iraq. The Iraqi government because, obviously, of the hostility between us and them, didn't cooperate in turning him over and gave him sanctuary, as it did give sanctuary to other terrorists. But the allegation that has been made that the 1993 attack on the World Trade Center was done by the Iraqi government I think is absolutely without foundation.

=== 1994 ===
Farouk Hijazi, former head of the Iraqi Intelligence Service, allegedly met with Osama bin Laden in Sudan. Former Central Intelligence Agency (CIA) counter-terrorism official Vincent Cannistraro claimed that bin Laden rejected Hijazi's overtures, and concluded that bin Laden did not want to be "exploited" by Iraq's secular administration. According to The Guardian:

Most analysts believe, however, that the ideological differences between the Iraqis and the terrorists were insurmountable. It is thought that bin Laden rejected any kind of alliance, preferring to pursue his own policy of global jihad, or holy war.

=== 1995 ===
==== 19 February, Sudan ====
A handwritten note, part of the Operation Iraqi Freedom documents collection released by the US government in 2006, suggested that a representative of Saddam's government met with bin Laden in Sudan on 19 February 1995. According to the note, bin Laden suggested "carrying out joint operations against foreign forces" in Saudi Arabia.

An ABC News article noted that al-Qaeda staged an attack in Riyadh nine months after the date of the document, though it did not go so far as to ascribe any responsibility to Iraq. ABC reported that the militants who attacked the facility "later confessed on Saudi TV to having been trained by Osama bin Laden." The ABC article further noted that "the document does not establish that the two parties did in fact enter into an operational relationship," and also that the contacts may have "been approved personally by Saddam Hussein." The article also cautioned that "this document is handwritten and has no official seal."

CNN terrorism expert Peter Bergen commented: "The results of this meeting were ... nothing. Two subsequent attacks against American forces in Saudi Arabia—a car bombing that year and the Khobar Towers attack in 1996—were carried out, respectively, by locals who said they were influenced by Mr. Bin Laden and by the Saudi branch of Hezbollah, a Shiite group aided by Iranian government officials."

The New York Times reported that a "joint intelligence task force" concluded that the document "appeared authentic". The document, which asserted that bin Laden "was approached by our side," stateed that bin Laden previously "had some reservations about being labeled an Iraqi operative," but was willing to meet in Sudan. At the meeting, bin Laden requested that sermons of an anti-Saudi cleric be rebroadcast in Iraq, a request which, according to the document, was approved by Baghdad. The document also stated that Iraqi intelligence officers began "seeking other channels through which to handle the relationship, in light of [bin Laden's departure from Sudan]". The document went on to recommend that "cooperation between the two organizations should be allowed to develop freely through discussion and agreement."

==== September, Sudan ====
Brigadier Salim al-Ahmed, a top explosives expert of the Iraqi Intelligence Service (IIS), allegedly met with bin Laden in Khartoum, Sudan, in September–October 1995. According to the 9/11 Commission Report:

At least one of these reports dates the meeting to 1994, but other evidence indicates the meeting may have occurred in February 1995.

A second meeting between the IIS and bin Laden was alleged to have taken place in Sudan, in July 1996. At this meeting, Mani' Abd Rashid al-Tikriti, a director of the IIS, was allegedly present. According to the 9/11 Commission Report, however, the veracity of the second meeting is in doubt:

The information is puzzling, since bin Ladin left Sudan for Afghanistan in May 1996, and there is no evidence he ventured back there (or anywhere else) for a visit. In examining the source material, the reports note that the information was received 'third hand,' passed from the foreign government service that 'does not meet directly with the ultimate source of the information, but obtains the information from him through two unidentified intermediaries, one of whom merely delivers the information to the Service.'" The same source also claims al-Ahmed was seen near bin Laden's farm in December 1995.

==== From 1995, Salman Pak, Iraq ====
Several Iraqi defectors reported that hundreds of foreign terrorists were being trained in airplane hijacking techniques "without weapons" using a real airplane—variously reported as a Boeing 707 and a Tupolev Tu-154—as a prop at Salman Pak, an Iraqi military facility just south of Baghdad, between 1995 and 2000. The training program was allegedly run by the Iraqi Intelligence Service. This allegation was also reported by the following defectors:

- Sabah Khalifa Khodada Alami (former Iraqi army captain), who provided details of the layout of the camp as early as 1998.
- "Abu Zeinab" al-Ghurairy (former Iraqi sergeant who claimed to be a general), who corroborated Khodada's details in 2000.
- Khidir Hamza, a scientist who worked on Iraq's nuclear program.
- Abdul Rahman al-Shamari, an Iraqi Intelligence Service agent in US custody.
- "Abu Mohammed", a former colonel in Fedayeen Saddam.

The credibility of Khodada and Abu Zeinab is often questioned, however, due to their association with the Iraqi National Congress, an organization that has been accused of deliberately supplying false information to the US government in order to build support for administration change. According to Helen Kennedy of the New York Daily News:

The INC's agenda was to get us into a war. The really damaging stories all came from those guys, not the CIA. They did a really sophisticated job of getting it out there.

One of the defectors, al-Ghurairy, has been described as "a complete fake—a low-ranking former soldier whom Ahmed Chalabi's aides had coached to deceive the media." Another defector who interviewed al-Ghurairy noted, "He is an opportunist, cheap and manipulative. He has poetic interests and has a vivid imagination in making up stories."

Inconsistencies in the stories of the defectors led US officials, journalists, and investigators to conclude that the Salman Pak story was inaccurate. One senior US official said that they had found "nothing to substantiate" the claim that al-Qaeda trained at Salman Pak other than the testimony of several INC defectors.

Saddam's government had even denied that an airplane existed 25 kilometers southeast of Baghdad. The Iraqi ambassador to the U.N., Mohammed Aldouri, told Frontline in the fall of 2001:

I am lucky that I know the area, this Salman Pak. This is a very beautiful area with gardens, with trees. It is not possible to do such a program there, because there's no place for planes.

The chief of the Iraq Survey Group, Charles Duelfer, expressed a different opinion about Salman Pak in 2001: "We always just called them the terrorist camps. We reported them at the time, but they've obviously taken on new significance." He also said that the Iraqis told the United Nations Special Commission (UNSCOM) that the Salman Pak facility was used by police for counter-terrorist training. "Of course we automatically took out the word 'counter'," Duelfer explained. Furthermore, after the invasion of Iraq, the camp was captured by US Marines "after it was discussed by Egyptian and Sudanese fighters caught elsewhere in Iraq." Brigadier General Vincent K. Brooks described the capture, saying:

The nature of the work being done by some of those people that we captured, their inferences to the type of training that they received, all of these things give us the impression that there was terrorist training that was conducted at Salman Pak.

The investigative journalist Seymour Hersh, however, expressed an opposing stance:

Salman Pak was overrun by American troops on 6 April [2003]. Apparently, neither the camp nor the former biological facility has yielded evidence to substantiate the claims made before the war [that the camp was used for terrorist training].

A similar view was also held by Douglas MacCollam, a writer for the Columbia Journalism Review:

There still remain claims and counterclaims about what was going on at Salman Pak. But the consensus view now is that the camp was what Iraq told UN weapons inspectors it was – a counterterrorism training camp for army commandos.

In the Senate Intelligence Committee's 2006 report, the Defense Intelligence Agency stated that it found "no credible reports that non-Iraqis were trained to conduct or support transnational terrorist operations at Salman Pak after 1991." Explaining the origin of the false allegations, the DIA concluded that Operation Desert Storm had brought attention to the training base at Salman Pak, and thus "fabricators and unestablished sources who reported hearsay or third-hand information created a large volume of human intelligence reporting. This type of reporting surged after September 2001."

==== Circa 1995, Iraq ====
An al-Qaeda operative using the alias Abu Abdullah al-Iraqi allegedly requested help in chemical weapons training from Saddam. The request was supposedly approved and trainers from Unit 999, an Iraqi secret-police organization organized by Uday Hussein, were dispatched to camps in Afghanistan. Two US counter-terrorism officials told Newsweek that they believed the information about al-Iraqi came exclusively from the captured al-Qaeda operative Ibn al-Shaykh al-Libi, who has since recanted, and whose credibility was disputed by both the CIA and the Defense Intelligence Agency.

A DIA report in February 2002 concluded:

This is the first report from Ibn al-Shaykh in which he claims Iraq assisted al-Qaida's CBRN [Chemical, Biological, Radiological or Nuclear] efforts. However, he lacks specific details on the Iraqis involved, the CBRN materials associated with the assistance, and the location where training occurred. It is possible he does not know any further details; it is more likely this individual is intentionally misleading the debriefers. Ibn al-Shaykh has been undergoing debriefs for several weeks and may be describing scenarios to the debriefers that he knows will retain their interest.

A CIA report in January 2003 voiced similar concerns, also noting that al-Libi was "not in a position to know" the things he had told interrogators. The CIA recalled all of its intelligence reports that were based on al-Libi's testimony in February 2004.

The New York Times reported in December 2005 that al-Libi lied about both this and other information regarding Saddam Hussein and al-Qaeda in order to avoid harsh treatment by his Egyptian captors, to whom he had been transferred under the controversial American policy of extraordinary rendition.

=== 1997 ===
On 7 December 1997, in a meeting between US and Taliban officials, the Taliban's acting Minister of Mines and Industry, Armad Jan, told the US Assistant Secretary of State for South and Central Asian Affairs, Karl Inderfurth, that the Taliban "had frustrated Iranian and Iraqi efforts to contact" bin Laden. Inderfurth, however, disagreed with this claim, and told The Washington Times, "I never saw any evidence in anything I was doing where there were any Iraqi connections." The same article also reported that:

Mr. Inderfurth said he did not believe the Taliban claim was credible at the time, and that he had no recollection of Taliban officials mentioning Iraqi or Iranian attempts to meet bin Laden in the following 19 meetings he would attend with the de facto Afghan regime for the next four years.

=== 1998 ===
==== Circa 1998, Baghdad ====
Ayman al-Zawahiri, second-in-command of al-Qaeda, allegedly met Taha Yasin Ramadan, vice-president of Iraq.

==== 1998, Washington, DC ====
Daniel Benjamin, head of the US National Security Council's counterterrorism division, headed a critical analysis of the CIA's contention that Iraq and al-Qaeda would not join forces. "This was a red-team effort," he said. "We looked at this as an opportunity to disprove the conventional wisdom, and basically we came to the conclusion that the CIA had this one right." He further stated that:

No one disputes that there have been contacts over the years. In that part of the America-hating universe, contacts happen. But that's still a long way from suggesting that they were really working together.

==== 23 February, Afghanistan ====
Osama bin Laden issued a fatwa urging jihad against all Americans. In his fatwa, bin Laden stated:

The ruling to kill the Americans and their allies – civilians and military – is an individual duty for every Muslim who can do it in any country in which it is possible to do it, in order to liberate the al-Aqsa Mosque and the holy mosque [Mecca] from their grip, and in order for their armies to move out of all the lands of Islam, defeated and unable to threaten any Muslim.

He also stated that one of his reasons for the fatwa was the "Americans' continuing aggression against the Iraqi people." Bin Laden mentioned aggression against Iraq four times in the fatwa, and perceived American aggression against Muslims seven times.

==== March, Baghdad ====
According to Inigo Gilmore of the Daily Telegraph, the Iraqi Intelligence Service arranged for an envoy from bin Laden to travel from Sudan to Baghdad to meet with Iraqi officials. Gilmore's claim was based on three stapled pages that he claimed to have found in the IIS headquarters in early 2003, which he smuggled out of the building while it was guarded by American troops. Gilmore stated that the CIA had already been through the building for intelligence "but they seem to have missed this particular document."

According to the handwritten documents, the al-Qaeda envoy stayed at the first-class Al-Mansour Hotel. A letter with this document states that the envoy was a trusted confidant of bin Laden. It also reads:

According to the above, we suggest permission to call the Khartoum station [Iraq's intelligence office in Sudan] to facilitate the travel arrangements for the above-mentioned person to Iraq. And that our body carry all the travel and hotel costs inside Iraq to gain the knowledge of the message from bin Laden and to convey to his envoy an oral message from us to bin Laden.

The letter referred to al-Qaeda's leader as an opponent of the Saudi regime and said that the message to be conveyed to bin Laden through the envoy "would relate to the future of our relationship with him, bin Laden, and to achieve a direct meeting with him." The meeting was allegedly extended by a week and the document "recommends contacts with bin Laden."

Based on these documents, the Telegraph stated that these "Iraqi intelligence documents discovered in Baghdad by The Telegraph have provided the first evidence of a direct link between Osama bin Laden's al-Qa'eda terrorist network and Saddam Hussein's regime."

According to the Observer, however, the Baghdad talks "are thought to have ended disastrously for the Iraqis, as bin Laden rejected any kind of alliance, preferring to pursue his own policy of global jihad."

==== 20 August, Khartoum ====
US President Bill Clinton ordered eighty Tomahawk missiles fired at targets in Afghanistan and Sudan, including the Al-Shifa pharmaceutical factory. The Clinton Administration claimed the factory was actually a chemical weapons plant operated by al-Qaeda.

Clinton's Secretary of Defense William Cohen would testify to the 9/11 Commission in 2004 that intelligence officials suspected "indirect links between the facility and bin Laden and the Iraqi chemical weapons program." He also noted that:

The direct physical evidence from the scene obtained at that time convinced the US intelligence community that their suspicions were correct about the facility's chemical weapons role and that there was a risk of chemical agents getting into the hands of al-Qaeda.

Officials later acknowledged, however, that:

The evidence that prompted President Clinton to order the missile strike on the Shifa plant was not as solid as first portrayed. Indeed, officials later said that there was no proof that the plant had been manufacturing or storing nerve gas, as initially suspected by the Americans, or had been linked to Osama bin Laden, who was a resident of Khartoum in the 1980s.

The Bureau of Intelligence and Research of the US State Department wrote a report in 1999 questioning the attack on the factory, in which it suggested that the connection to bin Laden was not accurate. James Risen reported in The New York Times:

Now, the analysts renewed their doubts and told Assistant Secretary of State Phyllis Oakley that the C.I.A.'s evidence on which the attack was based was inadequate. Ms. Oakley asked them to double-check; perhaps there was some intelligence they had not yet seen. The answer came back quickly: There was no additional evidence. Ms. Oakley called a meeting of key aides and a consensus emerged: Contrary to what the Administration was saying, the case tying Al Shifa to Mr. Bin Laden or to chemical weapons was weak.

Idris Babiker Eltayeb, the chairman of Al Shifa Pharmaceutical Industries, told reporters in 2004, "I had inventories of every chemical and records of every employee's history. There were no such [nerve gas] chemicals being made here." Sudan has since invited the US to conduct chemical tests at the site for evidence to support its claim that the plant might have been a chemical weapons factory. As of 2025, the US has refused the invitation to investigate and also to officially apologize for the attacks, and in 2004 Cohen told the 9/11 Commission that he "continue[d] to believe that destroying [the factory] was the right decision."

==== August, Pakistan ====
According to a "Summary of Evidence" released by the Pentagon in March 2005 concerning a detainee held at the Guantanamo Bay detention camp, the al-Qaeda agent—a former infantryman of the Iraqi Army—traveled to Pakistan in August 1998 with a member of Iraqi intelligence "for the purpose of blowing up the Pakistan, United States and British Embassies with chemical mortars."

An Associated Press report of the same document, however, includes the caveat:

There is no indication the Iraqi's purported terror-related activities were on behalf of Saddam Hussein's government, other than the brief mention of him [the detainee] traveling to Pakistan with a member of the Iraqi intelligence. ... The assertion that the [detainee] was involved in a plot against embassies in Pakistan is not substantiated in the document.

==== 4 November, New York ====
The US Department of Justice filed an indictment against Osama bin Laden. This indictment repeated the disputed claim that:

Al-Qaeda reached an understanding with the government of Iraq that al-Qaeda would not work against that government and that on particular projects, specifically including weapons development, al-Qaeda would work cooperatively with the Government of Iraq.

After reading the indictment, Richard A. Clarke sent a memo via email to US National Security Advisor Sandy Berger in which he stated that the Al-Shifa pharmaceutical factory was "probably a direct result of the Iraq-Al Qaida agreement." By 2001, however, based on several reviews of the evidence prompted by the Bush Administration, Clarke had changed his view. To date, no evidence of such an understanding or agreement has ever materialized. Clarke noted in his book Against All Enemies that many of the contacts cited by supporters of the invasion as proof of Iraqi and al-Qaeda cooperation "actually proved that al-Qaeda and Iraq had not succeeded in establishing a modus vivendi."

==== December ====
After President Clinton ordered a four-day bombing campaign of Iraq, known as Operation Desert Fox, the Arabic-language daily newspaper Al-Quds Al-Arabi speculated in an editorial that:

President Saddam Hussein, whose country was subjected to a four-day air strike, will look for support in taking revenge on the United States and Britain by cooperating with Saudi oppositionist Osama bin Laden, whom the United States considers to be the most wanted person in the world.

==== 18 or 21 December, Afghanistan ====
The Iraqi ambassador to Turkey, Farouk Hijazi, allegedly met with bin Laden in Afghanistan. An article that appeared in the Milanese newspaper Corriere della Sera was translated by the CIA as:

Saddam Hussayn and Usama bin Ladin have sealed a pact. Faruk Hidjazi, the former Director of the Iraqi Secret Services and now the country's Ambassador to Turkey, held a secret meeting with the extremist leader on 21 December.

The newspaper quoted Hijazi without attribution.

Former CIA counterterrorism official Vincent Cannistraro noted that bin Laden rejected Hijazi's overtures, concluding that he did not want to be "exploited" by Iraq's secular regime.

Hijazi, who was arrested in April 2003, denied any such meeting took place. US officials were, however, apparently skeptical of his claim.

=== 1999 ===
==== 11 January ====
Newsweek magazine reported that Saddam Hussein was joining forces with al-Qaeda to launch joint terror strikes against the US and the UK. An Arab intelligence officer, reported to know Saddam personally, told Newsweek: "very soon, you will be witnessing large-scale terrorist activity by the Iraqis." The planned attacks were said to be Saddam's revenge for the "continuing aggression" posed by the no-fly zones that showed the countries were still at war and had been since Operation Desert Fox. The planned attacks never materialized, and at the time officials questioned the validity of the claim.

The same Newsweek article also said:

Saddam may think he's too good for such an association [with bin Laden]. Jerold [sic] Post, a political psychologist and government consultant who has profiled Saddam, says he thinks of himself as a world leader like Castro or Tito, not a thug. 'I'm skeptical that Saddam would resort to terrorism,' says a well-informed administration official.

==== 14 January ====
ABC News reported that a few months after the embassy bombings in Africa, and the US retaliation against Sudan and Afghanistan, bin Laden "reaches out to his friends in Iraq and Sudan." The report stated:

ABC News has learned that in December, an Iraqi intelligence chief, named Farouk Hijazi, now Iraq's ambassador to Turkey, made a secret trip to Afghanistan to meet with bin Laden. Three intelligence agencies tell ABC News they cannot be certain what was discussed, but almost certainly, they say, bin Laden has been told he would be welcome in Baghdad.

This story was repeated by CNN on 13 February. The article reported that "Iraqi President Saddam Hussein has offered asylum to bin Laden, who openly supports Iraq against the Western powers."

According to the 9/11 Commission Report:

In February 1999, Allen proposed flying a U-2 mission over Afghanistan to build a baseline of intelligence outside the areas where the tribals had coverage. Clarke was nervous about such a mission because he continued to fear that Bin Ladin might leave for someplace less accessible. He wrote Deputy National Security Advisor Donald Kerrick that one reliable source reported Bin Ladin's having met with Iraqi officials, who "may have offered him asylum." Other intelligence sources said that some Taliban leaders, though not Mullah Omar, had urged Bin Ladin to go to Iraq. If Bin Ladin actually moved to Iraq, wrote Clarke, his network would be at Saddam Hussein's service, and it would be "virtually impossible" to find him. Better to get Bin Ladin in Afghanistan, Clarke declared.

In 2003, however, former CIA counterterrorism official Vincent Cannistraro told Newsweek that bin Laden rejected Hijazi's overtures, concluding that he did not want to be "exploited" by Iraq's secular regime. Hijazi, arrested in April 2003, reportedly "cut a deal [with American officials who] are using him to reactivate the old Iraqi intelligence network." A similar opinion was expressed by The Boston Globe, which reported:

Indeed, intelligence agencies tracked contacts between Iraqi agents and Al-Qaeda agents in the '90s in Sudan and Afghanistan, where bin Laden is believed to have met with Farouk Hijazi, head of Iraqi intelligence. But current and former intelligence specialists caution that such meetings occur just as often between enemies as friends. Spies frequently make contact with rogue groups to size up their intentions, gauge their strength, or try to infiltrate their ranks, they said.

==== 31 January ====
A 2005 article in The Weekly Standard claimed that the Russian state-owned news agency RIA Novosti reported in 1999 that "hundreds of Afghan Arabs are undergoing sabotage training in Southern Iraq and are preparing for armed actions on the Iraqi-Kuwaiti border. They have declared as their goal a fight against the interests of the United States in the region."

In the same article, The Weekly Standard claimed that the Kuwaiti government detained some al-Qaeda members at the border but noted that the Kuwaiti government did not respond to requests for more information about these alleged detainees.

==== May, Iraq ====
According to documents summarized by the US Joint Forces Command's Iraqi Perspectives Project, Uday Hussein ordered the Saddam Fedayeen to prepare for "special operations, assassinations, and bombings, for the centers and traitor symbols in London, Iran and the self-ruled areas [Kurdistan]". The special operation was referred to as "Blessed July," which was described by defense analyst Kevin Woods as "a regime-directed wave of 'martyrdom' operations against targets in the West."

Woods claimed that plans for "Blessed July" "were well under way at the time of the coalition invasion." He also noted that the Fedayeen was racked by corruption. "In the years preceding the coalition invasion," he said, "Iraq's leaders had become enamored of the belief that the spirit of the Fedayeen's 'Arab warriors' would allow them to overcome the Americans' advantages. In the end, however, the Fedayeen fighters proved totally unprepared for the kind of war they were asked to fight, and they died by the thousands."

BBC correspondent Paul Reynolds wrote of the "Blessed July" plans: "What these targets might have been is not stated and the plans, like so many drawn up by the Iraqis, came to nothing, it seems."

==== July, Iraq ====
Saddam Hussein allegedly cut off all contact with al-Qaeda, according to Khalil Ibrahim Abdallah, a former Iraqi intelligence officer in US custody.

==== September, Baghdad ====
Ayman al-Zawahiri, second-in-command of al-Qaeda, allegedly visited Iraq under a pseudonym to attend the ninth Popular Islamic Congress, according to the Iraqi politician Iyad Allawi. Farouk Hijazi allegedly orchestrated the visit.

According to Stephen F. Hayes of the Weekly Standard, Hijazi "has confirmed to US officials that he met Osama bin Laden in Sudan in 1994 [though he] denies meeting with al-Qaeda officials in 1998, but US officials don't believe him.".

==== December, Afghanistan ====
Abu Musab al Zarqawi first met Osama bin Laden, having come to his attention in 1998. An Israeli intelligence official noted that, when the two men met, "it was loathing at first sight." Mary Ann Weaver wrote:

According to several different accounts of the meeting, bin Laden distrusted and disliked al-Zarqawi immediately. He suspected that the group of Jordanian prisoners with whom al-Zarqawi had been granted amnesty earlier in the year had been infiltrated by Jordanian intelligence ... Bin Laden also disliked al-Zarqawi's swagger and the green tattoos on his left hand, which he reportedly considered un-Islamic. Zarqawi came across to bin Laden as aggressively ambitious, abrasive, and overbearing. His hatred of Shiites also seemed to bin Laden to be potentially divisive—which, of course, it was. ... As an Egyptian who had attempted to overthrow his own country's army-backed regime, al-Adel saw merit in al-Zarqawi's views. Thus, after a good deal of debate within al-Qaeda, it was agreed that al-Zarqawi would be given $5,000 or so in "seed money" to set up his own training camp outside the western Afghan city of Herat, near the Iranian border. It was about as far away as he could be from bin Laden. Saif al-Adel was designated the middleman.

Counterterrorism experts told The Washington Post that, while "Zarqawi accepted al-Qaeda money to set up his own training camp in Afghanistan, ... he ran it independently. While bin Laden was preparing the 11 Sept. hijacking plot, Zarqawi was focused elsewhere, scheming to topple the Jordanian monarchy and attack Israel."

Weaver reported that:

"At least five times, in 2000 and 2001, bin Laden called al-Zarqawi to come to Kandahar and pay bayat – take an oath of allegiance—to him. Each time, al-Zarqawi refused. Under no circumstances did he want to become involved in the battle between the Northern Alliance and the Taliban. He also did not believe that either bin Laden or the Taliban was serious enough about jihad. When the United States launched its air war inside Afghanistan, on 7 October 2001, al-Zarqawi joined forces with al-Qaeda and the Taliban for the first time. He and his Jund al-Sham fought in and around Herat and Kandahar.

When Zarqawi finally did take the oath in October 2004, it was "only after eight months of often stormy negotiations." Gary Gambill wrote:

While Zarqawi's network—by this time known as al-Tawhid wal-Jihad (Monotheism and Holy War)—was not completely independent of al-Qaeda, it was clearly autonomous. Zarqawi's men 'refused to march under the banner of another individual or group,' recalls Nu'man bin-Uthman, a Libyan Islamist leader now living in London who was in contact with Zarqawi at the time. During or shortly before the American-led invasion of Iraq in March 2003, Zarqawi returned to Iran, where he met with bin Laden's military chief, Muhammad Ibrahim Makawi (Saif al-Adel), who asked him to coordinate the entry of al-Qaeda operatives into Iraq through Syria. Zarqawi readily agreed and by the fall of 2003 a steady flow of Arab Islamists were infiltrating Iraq via Syria. Consequently, Zarqawi came to be recognized as the regional "emir" of Islamist terrorists in Iraq—without (until last month) having sworn fealty to bin Laden.

On the alleged bin Laden connection, Nixon Center terrorism experts Robert S. Leiken and Stephen Brooke wrote:

Though he met with bin Laden in Afghanistan several times, the Jordanian never joined al-Qaeda. Militants have explained that Tawhid was "especially for Jordanians who did not want to join al-Qaeda." A confessed Tawhid member even told his interrogators that Zarqawi was "against al-Qaeda." Shortly after 9/11, a fleeing Ramzi bin al-Shibh, one of the main plotters of the attacks, appealed to Tawhid operatives for a forged visa. He could not come up with ready cash. Told that he did not belong to Tawhid, he was sent packing and eventually into the arms of the Americans.

Zarqawi did not identify himself with bin Laden nor swear allegiance to him until October 2004, although he did twice seek financial support from al-Qaeda. Terrorist experts considered Zarqawi an "independent actor" who was setting himself up as a "competitor to bin Laden" rather than an al-Qaeda operative. Michael Isikoff reported in Newsweek that German law enforcement learned that Zarqawi's group operated in "opposition to" al-Qaeda and that Zarqawi even vetoed splitting charity funds with bin Laden's group.

In a 2005 interview on Al-Majd TV, former al-Qaeda member Walid Khan, who had fought in Afghanistan alongside Zarqawi's group, said:

The problem was that most of the Arabs there were Jordanians, supporters of Abu Mus'ab al-Zarqawi. We mixed with them. The problem was they didn't care about anyone but their sheikh, al-Maqdisi. They belonged to the Jordanian Bay'at Al-Imam, organized from 1995. They pledged allegiance to al-Maqdisi and were in jail for five years. They were sentenced to 15 years. They served five years and then were pardoned. So they went to Afghanistan. Their ideology further developed there. Of course, they accused the government, the army, and the police of heresy. This is the most dangerous group. I understood that they had differences of opinion with bin Laden on a number of issues and positions. Of course, we understood that only later. From the day al-Zarqawi's group arrived, there were [disagreements].

== 9/11 and lead-up to the Iraq War ==
=== 2000 ===
==== Kuala Lumpur, Malaysia ====
An Iraqi national with connections to the Iraqi embassy, Ahmad Hikmat Shakir al-Azzawi, allegedly helped arrange a top-level al-Qaeda meeting attended by two of the 9/11 hijackers, Khalid al-Midhar and Nawaf al-Hazmi, and by Tawfiq bin Attash, who was responsible for the USS Cole bombing. Contemporary reports claimed that Shakir al-Azzawi was a lieutenant colonel in the Fedayeen Saddam.

The CIA, however, concluded that while Shakir al-Azzawi was indeed an Iraqi with connections to the Iraqi embassy in Malaysia, he was a different person from a Fedayeen officer with a similar name. The Senate Select Committee on Intelligence concluded in 2002 that the "CIA received information that Shakir was not affiliated with al-Qa'ida and had no connections to the IIS [Iraqi Intelligence Service]."

=== 2001 ===
==== 25–27 February, Germany ====
Two unidentified Iraqi men were arrested in Germany on suspicion of spying. According to The Weekly Standard, the Arabic-language Parisian newspaper Al-Watan al-Arabi reported:

The arrests came in the wake of reports that Iraq was reorganizing the external branches of its intelligence service and that it had drawn up a plan to strike at US interests around the world through a network of alliances with extremist fundamentalist parties.

The same article also reported that:

The most serious report contained information that Iraq and Osama bin Ladin were working together. German authorities were surprised by the arrest of the two Iraqi agents and the discovery of Iraqi intelligence activities in several German cities. German authorities, acting on CIA recommendations, had been focused on monitoring the activities of Islamic groups linked to bin Ladin. They discovered the two Iraqi agents by chance and uncovered what they considered to be serious indications of cooperation between Iraq and bin Ladin. The matter was considered so important that a special team of CIA and FBI agents was sent to Germany to interrogate the two Iraqi spies.

This report and the interrogation records of the detained Iraqi agents were not discussed in the 9/11 Commission Report. It is not known whether the arrests revealed any cooperation between the men and either Iraqi intelligence or al-Qaeda.

==== 8 April, Prague, Czech Republic ====
The Czech counterintelligence service claimed that Mohamed Atta al-Sayed, a 9/11 hijacker, met with Ahmad Samir al-Ani, the consul at the Iraqi Embassy in Prague, in a café. This claim is generally considered to be false. According to columnist Robert Novak, Secretary of Defense Donald Rumsfeld "confirmed published reports that there is no evidence placing the presumed leader of the terrorist attacks in the Czech capital."

According to the January 2003 CIA report Iraqi Support for Terrorism, "the most reliable reporting to date casts doubt on this possibility" that such a meeting occurred.

Director of Central Intelligence George Tenet released "the most complete public assessment by the agency on the issue" in a statement to the Senate Armed Services Committee in July 2004, stating that the CIA was "increasingly skeptical" any such meeting took place. John McLaughlin, then deputy director of the CIA, described the extent of the Agency's investigation into the claim:

Well, on something like the Atta meeting in Prague, we went over that every which way from Sunday. We looked at it from every conceivable angle. We peeled open the source, examined the chain of acquisition. We looked at photographs. We looked at timetables. We looked at who was where and when. It is wrong to say that we didn't look at it. In fact, we looked at it with extraordinary care and intensity and fidelity.

The source for the claim that the occurred was based on a contact that the Czech intelligence service had within the Iraqi embassy, who was described in The Boston Globe as "a single informant from Prague's Arab community who saw Atta's picture in the news after the 11 September attacks, and who later told his handlers that he had seen him meeting with Ani. Some officials have called the source unreliable."

The claim was officially stated by Czech Prime Minister Miloš Zeman and Interior Minister Stanislav Gross, but The New York Times reported that Czech officials later backed away from the claim, first privately, and then later publicly after the Times conducted "extensive interviews with leading Czech figures." When rumors of the Czech officials privately backing away from the claims first appeared in the Western media, Hynek Kmoníček, Czech envoy to the UN, stated, "The meeting took place." One senior Czech official who requested anonymity speculated that the media reports dismissing the meeting were the result of a "guided leak." On 15 March 2002 David Ignatius wrote in The Washington Post that:

Even the Czechs, who initially put out the reports about Atta's meeting with al-Ani, have gradually backed away. The Czech interior minister, Stanislav Gross, said in October that the two had met in April 2001. That version was altered slightly by Czech Prime Minister Miloš Zeman when he told CNN in November, 'Atta contacted some Iraqi agent, not to prepare the terrorist attack on [the twin towers] but to prepare [a] terrorist attack on just the building of Radio Free Europe' in Prague. Then, in December, Czech President Václav Havel retreated further, saying there was only 'a 70 percent' chance Atta met with al-Ani.

Havel, however, later "moved to quash the report once and for all" by making the statement publicly to the White House, as reported in The New York Times. According to the report, "Czech officials also say they have no hard evidence that Mr. Ani was involved in terrorist activities, although the government did order his ouster in late April 2001."

The New York Times report was described as "a fabrication" by Ladislav Spacek, a spokesman for Czech president Václav Havel. However, Spacek also "said Mr. Havel was still certain there was no factual basis behind the report that Mr. Atta met an Iraqi diplomat." The Times story was a potential embarrassment to Czech prime minister Milos Zeman after "extensive interviews with Czech and other Western intelligence officials, politicians and people close to the Czech intelligence community revealed that Mr. Zeman had prematurely disclosed an unverified report." According to an article in The Washington Post in 2003, the Czechs backed off of the claim: "After months of further investigation, Czech officials determined last year that they could no longer confirm that a meeting took place, telling the Bush administration that al-Ani might have met with someone other than Atta." An associate of al-Ani's suggested to a reporter that the Czech informant had mistaken another man for Atta, saying, "I have sat with the two of them at least twice. The double is an Iraqi who has met with the consul. If someone saw a photo of Atta he might easily mistake the two."

The Chicago Tribune on 29 August 2004 also reported that a man from Pakistan named Mohammed Atta (spelling his name with two "m's" rather than one) flew to the Czech Republic in 2000, confusing the intelligence agency, who thought it was the same Mohamed Atta. In September 2004, Jiří Ruzek, the former head of the Czech Security Information Service, told the Czech newspaper Mladá fronta DNES, "This information was verified, and it was confirmed that it was a case of the same name. That is all that I recall of it." Opposition leaders in the Czech Republic publicly called this a failure on the part of Czech intelligence, and it is not clear that any Czech officials still stand by the story as of 2025. In hopes of resolving the issue, Czech officials hoped to be given access to information from the US investigation, but that cooperation was not forthcoming.

In May 2004, the Czech newspaper Pravo speculated that the source of the information behind the rumored meeting was actually the discredited INC chief Ahmed Chalabi.

A senior administration official told The Washington Post that the FBI had concluded that "there was no evidence Atta left or returned to the US" at the time he was supposed to be in Prague. FBI Director Robert S. Mueller III outlined the extent of their investigation into the hijackers' whereabouts in a speech in April 2002: "We ran down literally hundreds of thousands of leads and checked every record we could get our hands on, from flight reservations to car rentals to bank accounts." There are no known travel records showing Atta leaving or entering the US at that time, and everything known about Atta's whereabouts suggests that he was in Florida at the time. Furthermore, according to Czech police chief Jiří Kolář, "there were no documents showing that Atta visited Prague at any time" in 2001. Even further doubt was cast on rumors of such a meeting in December 2003 when al-Ani, in US custody, reportedly denied having ever met Atta. According to Newsweek, it was "a denial that officials tend to believe given that they have not unearthed a scintilla of evidence that Atta was even in Prague at the time of the alleged rendezvous."

Atta's own religious and political convictions made him violently opposed to the Saddam regime. According to the 9/11 Commission Report:

In his interactions with other students, Atta voiced virulently anti-Semitic and anti-American opinions, ranging from condemnations of what he described as a global Jewish movement centered in New York City that supposedly controlled the financial world and the media, to polemics against governments of the Arab world. To him, Saddam Hussein was an American stooge set up to give Washington an excuse to intervene in the Middle East.

The 9/11 Commission also addressed the question of an alleged Prague connection and listed many of the reasons above that such a meeting could not have taken place. The report noted that:

the FBI has gathered intelligence indicating that Atta was in Virginia Beach on 4 April (as evidenced by a bank surveillance camera photo), and in Coral Springs, Florida on 11 April, where he and Shehhi leased an apartment. On 6, 9, 10, and 11 April, Atta's cellular telephone was used numerous times to call various lodging establishments in Florida from cell sites within Florida. We cannot confirm that he placed those calls. But there are no US records indicating that Atta departed the country during this period." Combining FBI and Czech intelligence investigations, "[n]o evidence has been found that Atta was in the Czech Republic in April 2001.

The Commission still could not "absolutely rule out the possibility" that Atta was in Prague on 9 April traveling under an alias, but it concluded that:

There was no reason for such a meeting, especially considering the risk it would pose to the operation. By April 2001, all four pilots had completed most of their training, and the muscle hijackers were about to begin entering the United States. The available evidence does not support the original Czech report of an Atta-Ani meeting.

Former Vice President Dick Cheney, who was a proponent of the theory that Atta had met al-Ani in Prague, acknowledged in an interview on 29 March 2006 that:

We had one report early on from another intelligence service that suggested that the lead hijacker, Mohamed Atta, had met with Iraqi intelligence officials in Prague, Czechoslovakia. And that reporting waxed and waned where the degree of confidence in it, and so forth, has been pretty well knocked down now at this stage, that that meeting ever took place.

==== Summer, United Arab Emirates ====
According to David Rose, a reporter for Vanity Fair, Marwan al-Shehhi and Ziad Jarrah, two of the 9/11 hijackers, supposedly met with an unidentified Mukhabarat officer. Rose claimed he was told this story by members of the Iraqi National Congress. Their credibility on this matter, however, has since come into question.

==== Summer, Afghanistan ====
A man known as Abu Wael, who worked with Ansar al-Islam in northern Iraq, allegedly worked with al-Qaeda members from Afghanistan to set up a backup base. According to Abdul Rahman al-Shamari, Abu Wael was an alias for Saadan Mahmoud Abdul Latif al-Aani, allegedly a colonel in Iraq's intelligence services.

The 9/11 Commission reported:

There are indications that by then (2001) the Iraqi regime tolerated and may even have helped Ansar al-Islam against the common Kurdish enemy.

Furthermore, al-Shamari, incarcerated in Kurdistan, said that Saddam Hussein supported Ansar al Islam because he wanted to "foment unrest in the pro-American Kurdish area of Iraq." Intelligence agencies have, however, disputed such claims of support. According to Con Coughlin in the Telegraph:

While the White House has attempted to link the group directly to Hussein's intelligence agents, both the CIA and MI6 insist that all their intelligence suggests the group operates in [an] area over which Saddam has no control.

Spencer Ackerman wrote in November 2003 that:

Far from being "harbored" by Saddam, Ansar al Islam operated out of northeastern Iraq, an area under Kurdish control that was being protected from Saddam's incursions by US warplanes. Indeed, some of its members fought against Saddam during the Iran-Iraq war.

Mullah Krekar, the leader of Ansar al-Islam, called himself "Saddam's sworn enemy" and "scoff[ed]" at the notion that his friend Abu Wael worked with the Mukhabarat in a 2003 interview. Elsewhere, Abu Wael was described as a "former Iraqi army officer" and it was suggested that, while he may still have been working for Saddam, it was as a spy, gathering intelligence on Ansar al-Islam rather than cooperating with them.

Jason Burke wrote:

Saddam may well have infiltrated the Ansar-ul-Islam with a view to monitoring the developments of the group (indeed it would be odd if he had not) but that appears to be about as far as his involvement with the group, and incidentally with al-Qaeda, goes.

Ackerman likewise noted that the "far more likely explanation" of Abu Wael's contact with Ansar al-Islam "is that the dictator had placed an agent in the group not to aid them, as Powell implied to the Security Council, but to keep tabs on a potential threat to his own regime." Additionally, while Mullah Krekar had expressed admiration for bin Laden, he had denied any actual links to al-Qaeda, stating, "I have never met with him, nor do I have any contacts [with him]."

The Belgian think tank International Crisis Group called the group "nothing more than a minor irritant in local Kurdish politics" and suggested that the alleged ties to bin Laden were the product of propaganda by the secular Patriotic Union of Kurdistan (PUK). Ansar al-Islam was officially identified as a terrorist group by the US Secretary of the Treasury on 20 February 2003, one month before the 2003 invasion of Iraq, and weeks after Powell's presentation to the United Nations, and it was not until March 2004 that it was officially added to the US list of Foreign Terrorist Organizations.

Ansar al-Islam's "weapons of mass destruction" research was exaggerated, according to journalist and terrorism expert Jason Burke:

As one of the first journalists to enter the research facilities at the Darunta camp in eastern Afghanistan in 2001, I was struck by how crude they were. The Ansar al-Islam terrorist group's alleged chemical weapons factory in northern Iraq, which I inspected the day after its capture in 2003, was even more rudimentary.

==== July, Rome ====
A general in the Iraqi intelligence service, Habib Faris Abdullah al-Mamouri, allegedly met with the 9/11 hijacker Mohammed Atta. Daniel McGrory, the reporter who claimed this information came from Italian intelligence, admitted, "There is no proof the men were in direct contact." A June or July meeting in Rome is completely at odds with everything known about Atta's whereabouts in mid-2001.

==== 21 July, Iraq ====
The state-run Iraqi newspaper Al-Nasiriya allegedly published an opinion piece written by Naeem Abd Muhalhal. The piece was said to praise Osama bin Laden and includes the following, which James Woolsey interpreted, in testimony before US district judge Harold Baer Jr., as a "vague" foreshadowing of the 9/11 attacks:

Bin Laden 'continues to smile and still thinks seriously, with the seriousness of the Bedouin of the desert about the way he will try to bomb the Pentagon after he destroys the White House.'

The opinion piece also claimed that:

Bin Ladin is insisting very convincingly that he will strike America on the arm that is already hurting.

and that the US:

will curse the memory of Frank Sinatra every time he hears his songs.

On the floor of the United States Senate, Senator Ernest Hollings interpreted this as foreknowledge:

In other words, the World Trade Towers. Here, over a year ahead of time in the open press in Iraq, they are writing that this man is planning not only to bomb the White House, but where they are already hurting, the World Trade Towers.

Senator Hollings read the opinion piece into the US Congressional Record. The opinion piece was later used in a lawsuit by families of 9/11 victims against, amongst others, the countries of Afghanistan and Iraq, as proof that Iraq had prior knowledge of the attack. Whilst the lawsuit was successful, presiding judge Baer noted that much of the plaintiff's case relied on hearsay.

==== 5 September, Spain ====
Abu Zubayr, an al-Qaeda cell leader in Morocco, allegedly met with Ramzi bin al-Shibh, a facilitator for the 9/11 attacks. It was alleged that Abu Zubayr was also an officer in the Iraqi Intelligence Service. Abu Zubayr was arrested in Morocco in 2002, and while news accounts widely noted that he was "one of the most important members of Al-Qaeda to be captured," no mainstream source substantiated, or even mentioned, the allegation that Abu Zubayr, a Saudi citizen, worked for the Iraqi Intelligence Service.

==== 19 September ====
Jane's reported a claim by Israel's military intelligence service, Aman, that for the past two years Iraqi intelligence officers had been shuttling between Baghdad and Afghanistan, meeting with Ayman Al Zawahiri. According to the sources, one of the Iraqi intelligence officers, Salah Suleiman, was captured in October by Pakistan near the border with Afghanistan.

==== 21 September, Washington, DC ====
Ten days after the 9/11 attacks, President Bush received a classified President's Daily Brief (PDB) indicating that the US intelligence community had no evidence linking Saddam Hussein to the 11 September attacks and that there was "scant credible evidence that Iraq had any significant collaborative ties with Al-Qaeda." The PDB wrote off the few contacts that existed between Saddam's government and al-Qaeda as attempts to monitor the group rather than attempts to work with them.

Murray Waas of the National Journal reported the existence of the briefing on 22 November 2005, describing it as saying that:

Saddam viewed Al-Qaeda as well as other theocratic radical Islamist organizations as a potential threat to his secular regime. At one point, analysts believed, Saddam considered infiltrating the ranks of Al-Qaeda with Iraqi nationals or even Iraqi intelligence operatives to learn more about its inner workings, according to records and sources.

This PDB was one of the documents the Bush Administration refused to turn over to the Senate Report of Pre-war Intelligence on Iraq, even on a classified basis, and refused to discuss other than to acknowledge its existence.

==== 23 September ====
The Daily Telegraph reported that Saddam Hussein "put his troops on their highest military alert since the Gulf war" two weeks before the 9/11 attacks. An intelligence official told the Telegraph that "[Saddam] was clearly expecting a massive attack and it leads you to wonder why," adding that there had been nothing obvious to warrant Saddam's declaration of "Alert G", Iraq's highest state of readiness. The article also reported that:

Saddam has remained out of the public eye in his network of bunkers since the military alert at the end of August and moved his two wives, Sajida and Samira, away from the presidential palaces in Baghdad to Tikrit, his home town 100 miles (160 km) to the north.

While the article reported that the "US is understood to have found no hard evidence linking Baghdad directly to the kamikaze attacks," it also cited Western intelligence officials as saying that:

The Iraqi leader had been providing al-Qaeda, Osama bin Laden's terrorist network, with funding, logistical back-up and advanced weapons training. His operations reached a 'frantic pace' in the past few months.

In another article published on the same day, The Telegraph reported that:

Iraq is one of the only countries that has not sent a message of sympathy or condolence to the US in the wake of the attacks. The state-run media seems to be gloating over America's catastrophe.

While distancing themselves from those attacks, Iraqi officials say the US got what it deserved.

In an interview, Naji Sabri, the country's foreign minister, enumerated American "crimes against humanity", from Hiroshima to Vietnam and Central America to Palestine, a bloody trail littered with millions of dead going back more than 50 years.

"All Muslim and Arab people," the foreign minister said, "consider the United States the master of terrorism, the terrorist power number one in the world."

The report of the Iraq Survey Group noted Saddam's reaction to the 9/11 attacks, concluding that it was a result of his paranoia:

Isolated internally by his paranoia over personal security, and externally by his misreading of international events, Saddam missed a major opportunity to reduce tensions with the United States following the 11 September 2001 terrorist attacks. By failing to condemn the attacks and express sympathy to the American people, Saddam reinforced US suspicions about his connections to Al Qa'ida and certified Iraq's credentials as a rogue state. He told his ministers that after all the hardships the Iraqi people had suffered under sanctions he could not extend official condolences to the United States, the government most responsible for blocking sanctions relief. From a practical standpoint, Saddam probably also believed—mistakenly—that his behavior toward the United States was of little consequence, as sanctions were on the verge of collapse.

The internal debate among Iraqi officials, according to the report, suggested that these officials were wary of Iraq being wrongly associated with al-Qaeda:

Some ministers recognized that the United States intended to take direct unilateral action, if it perceived that its national security was endangered, and argued that the best course of action was to 'step forward and have a talk with the Americans.' Also concerned with the assertion of a connection between Iraq and its 'terrorist allies,' they felt they must 'clarify' to the Americans that 'we are not with the terrorists.'

==== November, Khartoum ====
In November 2001, a month after the 11 September attacks, Mubarak al-Duri was contacted by the Sudanese intelligence services, who informed him that the FBI had sent Jack Cloonan and several other agents to speak with a number of people known to have ties to bin Laden. Al-Duri and another Iraqi colleague agreed to meet with Cloonan in a safe house overseen by the intelligence service. They were asked whether there was any possible connection between Saddam Hussein and al-Qaeda, and laughed, stating that bin Laden hated the dictator, whom he believed was a "Scotch-drinking, woman-chasing apostate."

==== 21 November ====
The Bush Administration froze the assets of the al-Taqwa network, accusing them of raising, managing and distributing money for al-Qaeda under the guise of legitimate business activity. Youssef Nada and Ali Ghalib Himmat, the two principals of Al Taqwa, were members of the Egyptian Muslim Brotherhood, and Nada was known to have good relations with Saddam Hussein.

Asat Trust, a Liechtenstein-based company earning revenue from Iraq's Oil-for-Food contracts, also had its assets frozen due to its relationship to al-Taqwa. Marc Perelman speculated:

The operation raises the possibility that Iraq quietly funneled money to Al-Qaeda by deliberately choosing an oil company working with one of the terrorist group's alleged financial backers.

=== 2002 ===
==== January ====
Captured al-Qaeda leader Ibn al-Shaykh al-Libi, after being secretly handed over to Egypt by the United States for interrogation, gave specific and elaborate details of ties between Iraq and al-Qaeda, included training in explosives, biological, and chemical weapons. His account, which has since been repudiated by himself, the Defense Intelligence Agency and the CIA as being fabricated under duress (see below), nevertheless provided much of the basis for United States claims of the threat from Hussein's continued regime, including Secretary of State Colin Powell's speech to the UN the next year.

==== February ====
The US Defense Intelligence Agency issued Defense Intelligence Terrorism Summary No. 044-02, the existence of which was revealed on 9 December 2005 by Doug Jehl in the New York Times, impugning the credibility of information gleaned from captured al-Libi. The DIA report suggested that al-Libi had been "intentionally misleading" his interrogators. The DIA report also cast significant doubt on the possibility of a Saddam Hussein-al-Qaeda conspiracy: "Saddam's regime is intensely secular and is wary of Islamic revolutionary movements. Moreover, Baghdad is unlikely to provide assistance to a group it cannot control."

==== March ====
Abu Zubaydah was captured in Pakistan. According to the Senate Report on Prewar Intelligence:

The CIA provided four reports detailing the debriefings of Abu Zubaydah, [thought at the time to be] a captured senior coordinator for al-Qaida responsible for training and recruiting. Abu Zubaydah said that he was not aware of a relationship between Iraq and al-Qaida. He also said, however, that any relationship would be highly compartmented and went on to name al-Qaida members who he thought had good contacts with the Iraqis. For instance, Abu Zubaydah indicated that he had heard that an important al-Qaida associate, Abu Mus'ab al-Zarqawi, and others had good relationships with Iraqi Intelligence. REDACTED. During the debriefings, Abu Zubaydah offered his opinion that it would be extremely unlikely for bin Ladin to have agreed to ally with Iraq, due to his desire to keep the organization on track with its mission and maintain its operational independence. In Iraqi Support for Terrorism, Abu Zubaydah's information is reflected as: Abu Zubaydah opined that it would have been 'extremely unlikely' for bin Laden to have agreed to "ally" with Iraq, but he acknowledged it was possible there were al-Qaida-Iraq communications or emissaries to which he was not privy.

==== 22 March, UK ====
Foreign Office political director Peter Ricketts sent a memo to Foreign Secretary Jack Straw stating bluntly that "US scrambling to establish a link between Iraq and al-Qaida is so far frankly unconvincing."

==== 25 March ====
The New Yorker published comments by weapons smuggler Mohamed Mansour Shahab that he had been directed by the Iraqi intelligence community to organize, plan, and carry out up to nine terrorist attacks against US targets in the Middle East, including an attack similar to the one carried out on the USS Cole. The smuggler was not considered credible, however; the Financial Times reported that:

It is apparent that the man is deranged. He claims to have killed 422 people, including two of his wives, and says he would drink the blood of his victims. He also has no explanation for why, although he was arrested two years ago, he only revealed his alleged links to al-Qaeda and Baghdad after the 11 September attacks.

Al-Qaeda expert Jason Burke wrote after interviewing Shahab, "Shahab is a liar. He may well be a smuggler, and probably a murderer too, but substantial chunks of his story simply are not true."

The New Yorker article also reported allegations made by prisoners at a prison run by the intelligence service of the Patriotic Union of Kurdistan. According to the article:

The allegations include charges that Ansar al-Islam has received funds directly from Al-Qaeda; that the intelligence service of Saddam Hussein has joint control, with Al-Qaeda operatives, over Ansar al-Islam; that Saddam Hussein hosted a senior leader of Al-Qaeda in Baghdad in 1992; that a number of Al-Qaeda members fleeing Afghanistan have been secretly brought into territory controlled by Ansar al-Islam; and that Iraqi intelligence agents smuggled conventional weapons, and possibly even chemical and biological weapons, into Afghanistan.

==== 21 April ====
The Daily Telegraph reported the following:

Members of Saddam's Republican Guard have been seen in two villages run by militants from Ansar al-Islam inside Iraqi Kurdistan, an area which is otherwise controlled by anti-Saddam factions. They were sighted by Western military advisers on a reconnaissance mission ... Many members of Ansar al-Islam, a radical Islamic cell, are Arabs who fought with the Taliban and al-Qa'eda forces in Afghanistan. Their numbers are believed to have been boosted recently by men fleeing the US military's recent Operation Anaconda in eastern Afghanistan ... The Iraqi leader has reportedly dispatched some of his best troops to bolster Ansar al-Islam, despite a long-term hatred of Islamic fundamentalism, because the group is opposed to his enemies in the Patriotic Union of Kurdistan (PUK) ... Links between Ansar al-Islam and Saddam were also alleged recently by Qassem Hussein Mohamed, who claims that he worked for Baghdad's Mukhabarat intelligence for 20 years. Saddam had clandestinely supported Ansar al-Islam for several years, he said. "[Ansar] and al-Qa'eda groups were trained by graduates of the Mukhabarat's School 999 – military intelligence.

==== May–July ====
Abu Musab al Zarqawi allegedly recuperated in Baghdad after being wounded while fighting with Taliban and al-Qaeda fighters resisting the United States invasion of Afghanistan. He was allegedly wounded in a US bombardment, and was joined in Baghdad by dozens of his followers. The United States, through a foreign intelligence service, notified Saddam Hussein's government that Zarqawi was living in Baghdad under an alias. According to a US Senate report on prewar intelligence on Iraq, "A foreign government service asserted that the IIS (Iraqi Intelligence Service) knew where al-Zarqawi was located despite Baghdad's claims that it could not find him." Nevertheless, no evidence has emerged of any collaboration between Zarqawi and Saddam's government. Jason Burke, author of Al-Qaeda: The True Story of Radical Islam, wrote that, "Stories that an injured leg had been amputated in Baghdad as al-Zarqawi was cared for by Saddam Hussein's personal physicians proved false. He also wrote that:

"What Powell did not say was that al-Zarqawi ... had operated independently of bin Laden, running his own training camp in the west of Afghanistan near Herat. It was a small operation and al-Zarqawi was not considered a significant player, by militants or Western and Middle Eastern intelligence services, at the time. It is likely that al-Zarqawi had some contact with bin Laden but never took the bay'at and never made any formal allegiance with the Saudi or his close associates. Instead he was one of the thousands of foreign activists living and working in Afghanistan during the late 1990s. ... al-Zarqawi was a rival, not an ally, of the Saudi."

Spencer Ackerman wrote in the Washington Monthly that, "US intelligence had already concluded [in 2002] that Zarqawi's ties to al-Qaeda were informal at best." He also noted that "if Zarqawi's ties to al-Qaeda were loose, his ties to Saddam were practically non-existent." He argued that Saddam did not "harbor" Ansar al Islam, since they:

Operated out of northeastern Iraq, an area under Kurdish control that was being protected from Saddam's incursions by US warplanes. Indeed, some of its members fought against Saddam during the Iran-Iraq war. Powell asserted that Saddam dispatched an agent to Ansar to forge an alliance with the Kurdish terrorists. If true, the far more likely explanation, however, is that the dictator had placed an agent in the group not to aid them, as Powell implied to the Security Council, but to keep tabs on a potential threat to his own regime.

The Senate Report on Prewar Intelligence Assessments on Iraq would state in 2004 that, "As indicated in Iraqi Support for Terrorism, the Iraqi regime was, at a minimum, aware of al-Zarqawi's presence in Baghdad in 2002 because a foreign government service passed information regarding his whereabouts to Iraqi authorities in June 2002. Despite Iraq's pervasive security apparatus and its receipt of detailed information about al-Zarqawi's possible location, however, Iraqi Intelligence told the foreign government service it could not locate al-Zarqawi."

While US officials knew by June 2004 that reports of al-Zarqawi's leg being amputated were incorrect, one official still believed at the time that al-Zarqawi may have received medical treatment in Baghdad.

A CIA report in late 2004 concluded that there was no evidence Saddam's government was involved or even aware of this medical treatment, and found "no conclusive evidence the Saddam Hussein regime had harbored Zarqawi. A US official told Reuters that the report was a mix of new information and a look at some older information and did not make any final judgments or come to any definitive conclusions. 'To suggest the case is closed on this would not be correct,' the official said."

A US official familiar with the report told Knight-Ridder that, "what is indisputable is that Zarqawi was operating out of Baghdad and was involved in a lot of bad activities." Another US official summarized the report as such: "The evidence is that Saddam never gave Zarqawi anything." US Secretary of Defense Donald Rumsfeld responded to the report by saying, "To my knowledge, I have not seen any strong, hard evidence that links the two."

Scholars have added that cooperation between Saddam and al-Zarqawi goes against everything known about both people. Counterterrorism scholar Loretta Napoleoni quotes former Jordanian parliamentarian Layth Shubaylat, who was personally acquainted with both Zarqawi and Saddam Hussein:

'First of all, I don't think the two ideologies go together, I'm sure the former Iraqi leadership saw no interest in contacting al-Zarqawi or al-Qaeda operatives. The mentality of al-Qaeda simply doesn't go with the Ba'athist one.' When he was in prison [in Jordan with Shubaylat], 'Abu Mos'ab wouldn't accept me,' said Shubaylat, 'because I'm opposition, even if I'm a Muslim.' How could he accept Saddam Hussein, a secular dictator?

A letter from an Iraqi intelligence official dated August 2002 that was recovered in Iraq by US forces and released by the Pentagon in March 2006 suggested that Saddam's government was "on the lookout" for Zarqawi in Baghdad and noted that finding Zarqawi was a "top priority"; three responses to the letter claimed that there was "no evidence" Zarqawi was in Iraq.

One high-level Jordanian intelligence official told the Atlantic Monthly that al-Zarqawi, after leaving Afghanistan in December 2001, frequently traveled to the Sunni Triangle of Iraq where he expanded his network, recruited and trained new fighters, and set up bases, safe houses, and military training camps. He said, however, "We know Zarqawi better than he knows himself. And I can assure you that he never had any links to Saddam."

==== 10 September, Berlin ====
AFP reported that German intelligence chief Heinz Fromm told WDR Television that "there was no proof that Iraqi leader Saddam Hussein had any link to al-Qaeda."

==== 17 September, Washington, DC ====
Director of Central Intelligence George Tenet testified before a Congressional Committee:

There is evidence that Iraq provided al-Qaida with various kinds of training – combat, bomb-making, and CBRN (chemical, biological, radiological and nuclear). Although Saddam did not endorse al-Qaida's overall agenda and was suspicious of Islamist movements in general, he was apparently not averse, under certain circumstances, to enhancing bin Laden's operational capabilities. As with much of the information on the overall relationship, details on training are (redacted as classified info) from sources of varying reliability.

The Senate Select Committee on Intelligence pointed out that the DCI's comments could be misleading: "The DCI's unclassified testimony did not include source descriptions, which could have led the recipients of that testimony to interpret that the CIA believed the training had definitely occurred." It is now known that the main source for Tenet's claim, which was repeated by the White House in October, was the now-discredited interrogation of captured al-Qaeda leader Ibn al-Shaykh al-Libi. The DIA and CIA have since indicated their belief that al-Libi, who recanted the story in January 2004, fabricated the entire thing under harsh interrogation techniques.

==== 19 September, New York ====
The CIA questioned former Iraqi foreign minister Naji Sabri, who was cooperating with authorities and whose intelligence was considered reliable by the Bush administration on WMD issues. The Iraqi official told them that, "Iraq has no past, current, or anticipated future contact with Osama bin Laden and al-Qaeda" and he "added that bin Laden was in fact a longtime enemy of Iraq." Senate Republicans indicated that the CIA did not disseminate this information because "it did not provide anything new." Yet at the same time, WMD information was immediately passed on to the administration. CIA spokesman Paul Gimigliano would not comment beyond stating that "the agency's decisions to disseminate intelligence are not guided by political considerations."

==== 25 September, Washington, DC ====
President Bush told reporters, "Al-Qaeda hides. Saddam doesn't, but the danger is, is that they work in concert. The danger is, is that al-Qaeda becomes an extension of Saddam's madness and his hatred and his capacity to extend weapons of mass destruction around the world. ... [Y]ou can't distinguish between al-Qaeda and Saddam when you talk about the war on terror."

==== October, UK ====
A British Intelligence investigation of possible links between Iraq and al-Qaeda issued a report concluding:

We have no intelligence of current cooperation between Iraq and al-Qaeda and do not believe that al-Qaeda plans to conduct terrorist attacks under Iraqi direction." The report also states "al-Qaeda has shown interest in gaining chemical and biological expertise from Iraq, but we do not know whether any such training was provided. We have no intelligence of current cooperation between Iraq and al-Qaeda and do not believe that al-Qaeda plans to conduct terrorist attacks under Iraqi direction.

==== 3 October, Philippines ====
Hamsiraji Marusi Sali, leader of the Abu Sayyaf terrorist group, which the Bush Administration viewed as affiliated with al-Qaeda, allegedly contacted Husham Hussain, deputy secretary of the Iraqi embassy immediately after a successful bombing. Weekly Standard editor Stephen Hayes pointed to additional evidence indicating that the group may have received some funding from Saddam's regime. Hayes noted that the support was suspended "temporarily it seems—after high-profile kidnappings, including of Americans, focused international attention on the terrorist group." Hayes cited documentation demonstrating that the Saddam regime was cutting off all contact with the group: "We have all cooperated in the field of intelligence information with some of our friends to encourage the tourists and the investors in the Philippines ... The kidnappers were formerly (from the previous year) receiving money and purchasing combat weapons. From now on we (IIS) are not giving them this opportunity and are not on speaking terms with them."

==== 8 October, Washington, DC ====
Knight Ridder reported that "a growing number of military officers, intelligence professionals and diplomats" have serious doubts about the Bush Administration's case for war, specifically raising doubts about claimed "links" between Iraq and al-Qaeda. One official told the reporter that "Analysts at the working level in the intelligence community are feeling very strong pressure from the Pentagon to cook the intelligence books." The article continued:

Officials said Rumsfeld's statement [26 September, that the US government has "bulletproof" confirmation of links between Iraq and al-Qaida members, including "solid evidence" that members of the terrorist network maintain a presence in Iraq] was based in part on intercepted telephone calls, in which an al-Qaida member who apparently was passing through Baghdad was overheard calling friends or relatives, intelligence officials said. The intercepts provide no evidence that the suspected terrorist was working with the Iraqi regime or that he was working on a terrorist operation while he was in Iraq.

==== 16 October, France ====
French President Jacques Chirac told the Beirut daily paper L'Orient Le Jour that "he knows of no relationship between Iraq and al-Qaeda."

==== 14 November, Baghdad ====
Abid Al-Karim Muhamed Aswod, officer at the Iraqi embassy in Pakistan, was identified as "responsible for the coordination of activities with the Osama bin Laden group" in a list of names published in an issue of the Babylon Daily Political Newspaper by Uday Hussein, interpreted by Judge Gilbert S. Merritt as some kind of private memo. Judge Merrit left out the passage published at the top of the list, which undercuts his story: "This is a list of the henchmen of the regime. Our hands will reach them sooner or later. Woe unto them." The Defense Intelligence Agency's only comment on the list was, "There are innumerable lists. So you have to ask what does it mean to be on this list? It takes time to sort through all this. People give names all over the place."

=== 2003 ===
==== January ====
The CIA released a special report to Congress entitled Iraqi Support for Terrorism. The report stated, "We have reporting from reliable clandestine and press sources that (deleted) direct meetings between senior Iraqi representatives and top al-Qaida operatives took place from the early 1990s to the present." The report concluded that:

In contrast to the patron-client pattern between Iraq and its Palestinian surrogates, the relationship between Iraq and al-Qaida appears to more closely resemble that of two independent actors trying to exploit each other – their mutual suspicion suborned by al-Qaida's interest in Iraqi assistance, and Baghdad's interest in al-Qaida's anti-US attacks.... The Intelligence Community has no credible information that Baghdad had foreknowledge of the 11 September attacks or any other al-Qaida strike.

The report also questioned the information coming from captured al-Qaeda leader Ibn al-Shaykh al-Libi, determining that the al-Qaeda leader was not in a position to know about any links to Saddam Hussein and that his stories were likely fabrications. Nevertheless, this information was cited uncritically by Colin Powell in his speech to the United Nations Security Council in February 2003. According to the report:

A variety of reporting indicates that senior al-Qa'ida leaders and Iraqi officials have discussed safehaven in Iraq. It is not clear whether the Iraqi regime made a new offer of safehaven to al-Qa'ida after the 11 September 2001, but ... more than a dozen al-Qa'ida affiliated extremists converged on Baghdad in the spring and summer of 2002. These operatives found a secure operating environment there ...

The report also noted that "An influx of al-Qa'ida assistance, operatives, and associates has made Kurdish-controlled northeastern Iraq-a mountainous no-man's land Baghdad has not controlled since 1991-an increasingly important operational hub for al-Qa'ida."

==== February, Jerusalem ====
Shin Bet, the Israeli intelligence service, reported that while the Iraqi government had been funding Palestinian terrorist groups such as the Arab Liberation Front they had not been able to conclusively link the Iraqi government and al-Qaeda.

==== 3 February ====
The New Yorker published an article titled "The C.I.A. and the Pentagon take another look at Al-Qaeda and Iraq." Some notable excerpts:

According to a senior Administration official, the C.I.A. itself is split on the question of a Baghdad-Al-Qaeda connection: analysts in the agency's Near East-South Asia division discount the notion; the Counterterrorist Center supports it. The senior Administration official told me that Tenet tends to agree with the Counterterrorist Center.

According to several intelligence officials I spoke to, the relationship between bin Laden and Saddam's regime was brokered in the early nineteen-nineties by the then de facto leader of Sudan, the pan-Islamist radical Hassan al-Tourabi. Tourabi, sources say, persuaded the ostensibly secular Saddam to add to the Iraqi flag the words "Allahu Akbar," as a concession to Muslim radicals.

I learned of another possible connection [between Saddam and al-Qaeda] early last year, while I was interviewing Al-Qaeda operatives in a Kurdish prison in Sulaimaniya. There, a man whom Kurdish intelligence officials identified as a captured Iraqi agent told me that in 1992 he served as a bodyguard to Ayman al-Zawahiri, bin Laden's deputy, when Zawahiri secretly visited Baghdad.

The article also noted that "According to American sources, Zarqawi was treated in a Baghdad hospital but disappeared from Baghdad shortly after the Jordanian government asked Iraq to extradite him."

==== 4 February, London ====
Saddam Hussein gave an interview with former Labour MP Tony Benn for Channel 4 News where he flatly denied supporting al-Qaeda. "If we had a relationship with al-Qaeda and we believed in that relationship," he said, "we wouldn't be ashamed to admit it."

==== 5 February, New York ====
Colin Powell gave a speech to the United Nations Security Council citing information linking Saddam Hussein to al-Zarqawi; this information was later revealed to be based on the now-discredited reports of al-Qaeda commander ibn Shaykh al-Libi.

==== 5 February, London ====
The BBC reported on an official British intelligence report concluding that there were no links between al-Qaeda and the Iraqi regime. According to BBC defense correspondent Andrew Gilligan, the classified document "says al-Qaeda leader Osama bin Laden views Iraq's ruling Ba'ath party as running contrary to his religion, calling it an "apostate regime. His aims are in ideological conflict with present day Iraq."

==== 11 February ====
An Osama bin Laden audiotape broadcast on Al Jazeera urged all Muslims to fight against the looming American invasion of Iraq:

O mujahideen brothers in Iraq, do not be afraid of what the United States is propagating in terms of their lies about their power and their smart, laser-guided missiles ... Regardless of the removal or the survival of the socialist party or Saddam, Muslims in general and the Iraqis in particular must brace themselves for jihad against this unjust campaign and acquire ammunition and weapons.

In the broadcast, he also reaffirmed his view of Saddam as an infidel:

Under these circumstances, there will be no harm if the interests of Muslims converge with the interests of the socialists in the fight against the crusaders, despite our belief in the infidelity of socialists. The jurisdiction of the socialists and those rulers has fallen a long time ago. Socialists are infidels wherever they are, whether they are in Baghdad or Aden.

==== 11 February, Washington, D.C ====
Director of Central Intelligence George Tenet testified before the Senate Select Committee on Intelligence, repeating the now-discredited claim that "Iraq has in the past provided training in document forgery and bomb-making to al-Qaeda. It has also provided training in poisons and gases to two al-Qaeda associates. One of these associates characterized the relationship he forged with Iraqi officials as successful." The associate he mentioned was Ibn al-Shaykh al-Libi, who was known to the DIA to have fabricated the story in response to harsh treatment by the Egyptian captors to whom he had been rendered.

==== 19 February ====
Terrorism expert Rohan Gunaratna published an article in the International Herald Tribune announcing the conclusion of his own research into the relationship between Iraq and al-Qaeda:

The case that Saddam's regime has helped Al-Qaeda is weak. Iraqi intelligence agents have met with Al-Qaeda leaders and operatives, but there is no conclusive evidence of Iraqi assistance to Al-Qaeda. Al-Qaeda operatives have traveled in and out of Baghdad, but there is no evidence of state sponsorship. Since US intervention in Afghani-stan in October 2001, I have examined several tens of thousands of documents recovered from Al-Qaeda and Taliban sources. In addition to listening to 240 tapes taken from Al-Qaeda's central registry, I debriefed several Al-Qaeda and Taliban detainees. I could find no evidence of links between Iraq and Al-Qaeda."

==== 16 March ====
The Observer reported that Yusuf Galan, "an alleged terrorist accused of helping the 11 September conspirators was invited to a party by the Iraqi ambassador to Spain under his al-Qaeda nom de guerre, according to documents seized by Spanish investigators." The Observer also reported that Galan was once "photographed being trained at a camp run by Osama bin Laden."

== Iraq War ==
=== 2003 ===
==== 19 March, Iraq ====
United States and coalition troops invaded Iraq, beginning with large-scale air strikes against specific targets.

==== April, Canada ====
The Canadian Institute of Strategic Studies published a piece regarding the purported link between Ansar al-Islam and the countries of Iraq and Iran, supporting Abu Iman al-Baghdadi's claims that Abu Wail, a senior Ansar leader, was an Iraqi intelligence officer:

[Abu Iman] al-Baghdadi's claims about [Abu Wail] are reinforced when one considers the radio chatter between Ansar forces and Iraqi army units heard by the Kurdish military. Furthermore, the leader of the PUK, Barhim Salih, claims that a group affiliated with Ansar is operating from Mosul, a city under Iraqi control at the time of writing ... There are individuals within Ansar's ranks who are both Taliban and al-Qaeda members who escaped from Afghanistan after the US invasion, but their numbers represent less than 10 percent of Ansar's strength. This and Ansar's leadership are the tenuous Iraq-al-Qaeda link that the US has been trying to establish ... As to the Iraqi link, the logic is similar. It is in Saddam's interest to have a force directly opposing Kurdish independence. Also, given the tenuous al-Qaeda links, Ansar offers Baghdad a proxy force to thwart America's regional ambitions.

==== 8 May ====
Judge Harold Baer Jr. of the United States District Court for the Southern District of New York issued a decision in a lawsuit ordering Osama bin Laden and Saddam Hussein to pay $104 million to the families of two men killed in the 11 September attacks. Baer ruled in part that the plaintiffs had "shown, albeit barely ... that Iraq provided material support to bin Laden and al-Qaeda." Judge Baer said, however, that these sources had provided "few actual facts" demonstrating that Iraq provided any material support for the attack and instead based his decision on this point of fact entirely upon their expertise. No testimony was introduced into the case by defendants to counter the statements of Woolsey or Powell.

==== 27 June ====
The UN Monitoring Group on Al-Qaeda released a draft report of its findings on al-Qaeda and the Taliban. In response to questions from the BBC, the committee's chief investigator Michael Chandler stated that "Nothing has come to our notice that would indicate links. That doesn't mean to say it doesn't exist. But from what we've seen the answer is no." Due to press reports that the group had issued a conclusion on the matter, Chandler issued a statement to the press clarifying that the Monitoring Group had not specifically investigated such links:

The report submitted to the Monitoring Group of the 1267 Committee does not address this issue and the Monitoring Group has reached no conclusions concerning these matters. Given the nature and intensity of the crisis surrounding Iraq during the reporting period, and attention being directed to such issues by the Security Council itself, an inquiry by the Monitoring Group into such issues was considered inappropriate.

==== 24 September ====
At a hearing before the United States Senate Committee on Foreign Relations, Paul Bremer testified that "There are, as the Director of the Central Intelligence has testified, clear intelligence connections, clear evidence of intelligence connections between al-Qaeda and Saddam's regime. We did not invent terrorism in Iraq. There was a terrorist regime there before." Bremer and Senator Russ Feingold both attempted to clarify the White House position on a Saddam/11 September connection, saying:

Senator Feingold: Mr. Chairman, I'll just conclude by saying this is the same road that the White House went down in the beginning by trying to patch together a few different anecdotes that may or may not have related to somebody, that may or may not have some connection to a group, that may or may not be connected to al-Qaeda. And the President had to actually admit the other day that there was no such connection...

Ambassador Bremer: But Senator, let me just correct the record on something you said about the President. If I understood what the President said was, he said that there was not a connection between Saddam Hussein and September 11.

Senator Feingold: Right.

Ambassador Bremer: He did not say that there was no connection between terrorism and Saddam.

Senator Feingold: No, I agree with that.

Ambassador Bremer: I just want to correct the record.

Senator Feingold: What I am indicating is that the American people in polling believed, at the time of the invasion of Iraq, that Saddam Hussein was involved in 9/11. So what I am suggesting is, the sloppiness in this regard is unfair to the American people. And I think there was a deliberate attempt to make the American people believe that somehow there was this connection.

==== 19 October ====
Al-Jazeera broadcast Osama bin Laden's message to the Iraqi people, in which he expressed satisfaction at having lured the US military into a conflict with Muslims in Iraq: "Be glad of the good news: America is mired in the swamps of the Tigris and Euphrates. Bush is, through Iraq and its oil, easy prey. Here is he now, thank God, in an embarrassing situation and here is America today being ruined before the eyes of the whole world."

==== 27 October, Washington, DC ====
Douglas J. Feith, undersecretary of defense for policy and head of the controversial Office of Special Plans, sendt a memo to Congress that included "a classified annex containing a list and description of the requested reports, so that the committee could obtain the reports from the relevant members of the intelligence community ... The classified annex was not an analysis of the substantive issue of the relationship between Iraq and al-Qaeda, and it drew no conclusions." The memo was subsequently leaked to the media and became the foundation for reports in the Weekly Standard by Stephen F. Hayes. W. Patrick Lang, former head of the Middle East section of Defense Intelligence Agency, called the Feith memo "a listing of a mass of unconfirmed reports, many of which themselves indicate that the two groups continued to try to establish some sort of relationship. If they had such a productive relationship, why did they have to keep trying?" Daniel Benjamin criticized the memo, noting that "in any serious intelligence review, much of the material presented would quickly be discarded." A Pentagon press release warned: "Individuals who leak or purport to leak classified information are doing serious harm to national security; such activity is deplorable and may be illegal."

==== 29 November ====
CNN reported on remarks by Coalition Ground Commander L. Gen. Ricardo Sanchez, saying:

General Sanchez also said that since the war began, the coalition, the US Army has not found a single al-Qaeda fighter here in Iraq. He said that the bulk of the opposition to US forces continues to be Saddam loyalists and Iraqi nationalists. You'll recall one of the razondetras (PH) for the Bush- led war in Iraq was that this was a – had become a hotbed of al-Qaeda terrorism. Again, the Army, seven months into the war has not found a single al-Qaeda terrorist.

==== 14 December, Ad-Dawr, Iraq ====
Saddam Hussein's arrest yielded a document from Saddam directing Iraqi Baathist insurgents to beware of working with foreign jihadists. A US official commenting on the document stressed that while Saddam urged his followers to be cautious in their dealings with other Arab fighters, he did not order them to avoid contact or rule out co-operation. The New York Times reported that the directive "provides a second piece of evidence challenging the Bush administration contention of close cooperation between Mr. Hussein's government and terrorists from al-Qaeda. C.I.A. interrogators have already elicited from the top Qaeda officials in custody that, before the American-led invasion, Osama bin Laden had rejected entreaties from some of his lieutenants to work jointly with Mr. Hussein." Reporter Greg Miller went even further, calling the document "one of the strongest pieces of evidence to contest the repeated insinuations of the Bush Administration that there were links between al-Qaeda and the Baath regime."

=== 2004 ===
==== 8 January ====
Carnegie Endowment for International Peace scholars Joseph Cirincione, Jessica Tuchman Mathews, and George Perkovich published the study "WMD in Iraq: Evidence and Implications," which looked into Saddam's relationship with al-Qaeda and concluded that, "although there have been periodic meetings between Iraqi and Al-Qaeda agents, and visits by Al-Qaeda agents to Baghdad, the most intensive searching over the last two years has produced no solid evidence of a cooperative relationship between Saddam's government and Al-Qaeda." The study also found "some evidence that there were no operational links" between the two entities.

==== 8 January ====
Colin Powell, in a press conference at the State Department that focused on the Carnegie study, "reversed a year of administration policy, acknowledging Thursday that he had seen no 'smoking gun [or] concrete evidence' of ties between former Iraqi President Saddam Hussein and al-Qaida." Powell nevertheless "stressed that he was still certain that Iraq had dangerous weapons and needed to be disarmed by force, and he sharply disagreed" with the Carnegie study.

==== March ====
The CIA withdrew its information regarding links between Hussein's Iraq and Al-Qaeda based on the 2002 testimony of al-Libi, after he began asserting that he fabricated them in order to receive better treatment from his captors. Al-Libi's claims, according to intelligence officials, showed how the credibility of captured Al-Qaeda detainees was sometimes "spotty".

==== 21 March ====
Former counterterrorism czar Richard A. Clarke was interviewed by CBS. In the interview, Clarke expressed particular frustration with Paul Wolfowitz, whom Clarke said had wanted to focus on Iraq, rather than al-Qaeda, when the topic of terrorism came up. Clarke noted that Wolfowitz said in an April 2001 meeting, "We don't have to deal with al-Qaeda. Why are we talking about that little guy? We have to talk about Iraqi terrorism against the United States." Clarke told the interviewer, "And I said, 'Paul, there hasn't been any Iraqi terrorism against the United States in eight years!' And I turned to the deputy director of the CIA and said, 'Isn't that right?' And he said, 'Yeah, that's right. There is no Iraqi terrorism against the United States." Clarke added, "There's absolutely no evidence that Iraq was supporting al-Qaeda, ever."

==== 7 June ====
The Weekly Standard, which had previously supported the idea that Abu Musab al Zarqawi was loyal to Osama bin Laden, published an article acknowledging that the two had no ties.

==== 16 June ====
US attorney Patrick J. Fitzgerald, who oversaw the government's case against al-Qaeda members accused of bombing US embassies in Africa in 1998, testified before the 9/11 Commission. He told the Commission that a US Department of Justice indictment that mentioned ties between Iraq and al-Qaeda had been superseded by a later indictment which dropped the language because it could not be confirmed by investigators. In his testimony he stated:

And the question of relationship between Iraq and al-Qaeda is an interesting one. I don't have information post-2001 when I got involved in a trial, and I don't have information post-11 September. I can tell you what led to that inclusion in that sealed indictment in May and then when we superseded, which meant we broadened the charges in the Fall, we dropped that language. We understood there was a very, very intimate relationship between al-Qaeda and the Sudan. They worked hand in hand. We understood there was a working relationship with Iran and Hezbollah, and they shared training. We also understood that there had been antipathy between al-Qaeda and Saddam Hussein because Saddam Hussein was not viewed as being religious.

We did understand from people, including al-Fadl—and my recollection is that he would have described this most likely in public at the trial that we had, but I can't tell you that for sure; that was a few years ago—that at a certain point they decided that they wouldn't work against each other and that we believed a fellow in al-Qaeda named Mondu Saleem, Abu Harzai the Iraqi, tried to reach a, sort of, understanding where they wouldn't work against each other. Sort of, the enemy of my enemy is my friend. And that there were indications that within Sudan when al-Qaeda was there—which al-Qaeda left in the summer of '96 or spring '96—there were efforts to work on joint—you know, acquiring weapons.

Clearly, al-Qaeda worked with the Sudan in getting those weapons in the national defense force there and the intelligence service. There were indications that al-Fadl had heard from others that Iran was involved. And they also had heard that Iraq was involved. The clearest account from al-Fadl as a Sudanese was that he had dealt directly with the Sudanese intelligence service, so we had firsthand knowledge of that. We corroborated the relationship with Iran to a lesser extent but to a solid extent. And then we had information from al-Fadl, who we believe was truthful, learning from others that there were also was efforts to try to work with Iraq. That was the basis for what we put in that indictment. Clearly, we put Sudan in the first order at that time as being the partner of al-Qaeda.

We understood the relationship with Iran but Iraq, we understood, went from a position where they were working against each other to a standing down against each other. And we understood they were going to explore the possibility of working on weapons together. That's my piece of what I know. I don't represent to know everything else, so I can't tell you, well, what we've learned since then. But there was that relationship that went from opposing each other to not opposing each other to possibly working with each other.

==== 17 June ====
At a press conference, the chairman and vice chairman of the 9/11 Commission stated:

Thomas Kean: Were there contacts between al-Qaeda and Iraq? Yes. Some of them are shadowy, but there's no question they were there.
Lee H. Hamilton: I must say I have trouble understanding the flap over this. The Vice President is saying, I think, that there were connections between Al-Qaeda and Saddam Hussein's government. We don't disagree with that. So it seems to me that the sharp differences that the press has drawn, the media has drawn, are not that apparent to me.

==== 18 June ====
Russian President Vladimir Putin claimed that Russian intelligence warned the US "that official organs of Saddam's regime were preparing terrorist acts on the territory of the United States and beyond its borders, at US military and civilian locations." CNN reported that Putin "did not elaborate on any details of the warnings of terror plots or mention whether they were tied to the al-Qaeda terror network," and that Putin "also said Russia had no information that Saddam's regime had actually committed any terrorist acts."

==== 20 June ====
The Boston Globe reported that:

Commissioner John Lehman, a Republican, came to the defense of Vice President Dick Cheney, who is the most aggressive in contending that there were strong Iraqi ties to Al-Qaeda. Lehman said new intelligence that 'we are now in the process of getting" indicates one of Hussein's Fedayeen fighters, a lieutenant colonel, was a prominent Al-Qaeda member.' Cheney has said he probably has intelligence the commission does not have, and 'the vice president was right when he said that,' Lehman said on NBC's 'Meet the Press.' Lehman said the news media were 'outrageously irresponsible' to portray the staff report as contradicting what the administration said. The commission's vice chairman, former representative Lee Hamilton, Democrat of Indiana, said the White House and the commission agree on the central point: There is no evidence of a collaborative relationship between Al-Qaeda and Iraq in the attacks of 11 September 2001, on the United States.

==== 29 June ====
In an interview with Tom Brokaw, former Iraqi Prime Minister Iyad Allawi said that even though the 9/11 Commission found no evidence of a collaborative relationship between Saddam Hussein and al-Qaeda:

I believe very strongly that Saddam had relations with al-Qaida. And these relations started in Sudan. We know Saddam had relationships with a lot of terrorists and international terrorism. Now, whether he is directly connected to the September – atrocities or not, I can't – vouch for this. But definitely I know he has connections with extremism and terrorists.

==== 9 July ====
The Senate Select Committee on Intelligence released a report assessing the state of prewar intelligence on Iraq. The report concluded that the CIA's assessment that there was no evidence of a formal relationship between Iraq and al-Qaeda was justified.

==== 22 July ====
The 9/11 Commission released its final report on the 11 September attacks, concluding that there was no evidence of an operational relationship between Saddam Hussein and al-Qaeda. Vice President Dick Cheney responded to the report by saying, "They did not address the broader question of a relationship between Iraq and Al-Qaeda in other areas, in other ways." Thomas Kean, the Commission chairman, also noted that the commission's mandate was confined to the September 11 attacks, but did say that the inquiry had led members into related areas as well.

==== 30 July ====
The Center for Policing Terrorism, a US think tank formed after 9/11, releases the Ansar al-Islam Dossier, which states:

Formed in December 2001 out of a conglomeration of Kurdish Islamist groups, [Ansar al-Islam] is closely allied with and receives both ideological and strategic inspiration from al-Qaeda. A number of Ansar members trained at al-Qaeda camps in Afghanistan, and the group provided safe haven to al-Qaeda and affiliated terrorist groups until its operations were disrupted during Operation Iraqi Freedom (OIF) ... In August 2002, Dr. Rohan Gunaratna, who has described Ansar as a 'very important' group within the larger framework of bin Laden's World Islamic Front for Jihad Against the Jews and Crusaders stated, '[Ansar] has received limited support from Iraq, and I stress limited.'

According to Dr. Gunaratna, Ansar received support from Iraqi agents with the specific intention of infiltrating the anti-PUK group and not to strengthen the Islamist group; Ansar remains an anti-Saddam and an anti-Western group. Some commentators would draw a different conclusion with respect to the nature of Ansar's relationship with Saddam, especially in the period immediately prior to OIF. According various reports, as well as claims made by US and PUK officials prior to OIF, the Iraqi regime helped to smuggle weapons to Ansar from Afghanistan. According to another report, PUK explosives experts believe that the Iraqi military intelligence supplied Ansar with TNT, which was in addition to other weaponry that was supplied to Ansar from areas under Baathist control. Another indication of links between al-Qaeda and Saddam Hussein's regime, which the Bush administration cited, are the activities of Abu Musab Zarqawi, who is believed to have run one of Ansar's terrorist training camps in northern Iraq prior to OIF.

In the report, Rohan Gunaratna noted that Saddam's relationship with Ansar was one of spying and infiltration rather than cooperation:

Qassem Hussein, another Iraqi intelligence officer now in Kurdish custody, has stated that Abu Wael is the true leader within Ansar. However, Rohan Gunaratna believes that Qassem Hussein is likely to be a penetration agent with hidden loyalties to Saddam. As Ansar was anti-PUK and the PUK was supported by the US Saddam was very interested to use Ansar against the PUK. Therefore, Qassem may have been providing Abu Wael with a cover story.

Gunaratna concluded in his own study of the relationship between Iraq and al-Qaeda that "there is no conclusive evidence of Iraqi assistance to Al-Qaeda ... The documentation and interviews indicated that Al-Qaeda regarded Saddam, a secular leader, as an infidel" and warned in February 2003 that "an invasion of Iraq would give a new lease on life to existing and emerging terrorist groups."

==== 29 August ====
In an interview with Agence France-Presse, Hudayfa Azzam, the son of Abdullah Yusuf Azzam, claimed Saddam Hussein "strictly and directly controlled" members of al-Qaeda in Iraq before the US invasion. According to Azzam, Arabs who fought in Afghanistan began going to Iraq after the 11 September attacks because they wanted to flee Afghanistan and take advantage of Iraq's relative stability. The AFP quoted Hudayfa as saying, "[al-Qaeda] infiltrated into Iraq with the help of Kurdish mujahideen from Afghanistan, across mountains in Iran," and when the possibility of a US-led invasion became clearer, "Saddam Hussein's regime welcomed them with open arms and young Al-Qaeda members entered Iraq in large numbers, setting up an organisation to confront the occupation." Azzam made it clear that the cooperation was caused by the imminent US occupation. According to AFP:

"Iraq is attracting Islamic militants from across the world determined to join the 'holy war' against the US-led occupation," the son of Osama bin Laden's mentor Abdullah Azzam told AFP in an interview. "Hundreds of Muslims from all over Arab and non-Arab countries go to Iraq to help the resistance end the occupation, spurred by the conviction that jihad is a duty against the occupier," said Hudayfa Azzam ... "The Iraqi resistance was the fruit of the American occupation" and buyoed by the "fatwa (religious decree) which considers jihad a duty when a Muslim country is occupied," he said.

==== 4 October, Washington, DC ====
A new CIA assessment, requested by Vice President Dick Cheney, concluded that there was no evidence that Saddam Hussein's regime harbored Jordanian terrorist Abu Musab al-Zarqawi. Knight-Ridder reporters called the CIA study "the latest assessment that calls into question one of President Bush's key justifications for last year's US-led invasion of Iraq."

==== 4 October, Washington, D.C ====
US Secretary of Defense Donald Rumsfeld told the Council on Foreign Relations that he had seen no "strong, hard evidence that links" Saddam Hussein and al-Qaeda. He admitted in the statement that the information he had relied upon for earlier statements linking the two "may have been something that was not representative of a hard linkage."

==== 5 October ====
A US official familiar with the CIA's review on links between Saddam and al-Qaeda told Knight-Ridder that the report contained details about the arrests in late 2002 or early 2003 of three of Zarqawi's "associates" by the regime. "This was brought to Saddam's attention and he ordered one of them released," the official said, providing no further details.

=== 2005 ===
==== 15 April, Washington, DC ====
Senator Carl Levin released newly declassified intelligence documents which suggested that Bush administration claims of a relationship between Saddam and al-Qaeda contradicted the conclusions of the intelligence community. Levin said, "These documents are additional compelling evidence that the Intelligence Community did not believe there was a cooperative relationship between Iraq and al-Qaeda, despite public comments by the highest ranking officials in our government to the contrary."

==== 19 May ====
In an interview with Al-Hayat, Jordanian King Abdullah II revealed that Saddam Hussein had rejected repeated requests from Jordan to hand over Abu Musab al-Zarqawi. According to Abdullah, "We had information that he entered Iraq from a neighboring country, where he lived and what he was doing. We informed the Iraqi authorities about all this detailed information we had, but they didn't respond." King Abdullah told Al-Hayat that Jordan exerted "big efforts" with Saddam's government to extradite al-Zarqawi, but added that "our demands that the former regime hand him over were in vain."

Shortly after Abdullah's interview, former Iraqi interim Prime Minister Iyad Allawi responded to Abdullah's claim in an interview with al-Hayat: "The words of the Jordanian King are correct and important. We have proof of al-Zawahiri's visit to Iraq [in September 1999], but we do not have the precise date or information on al-Zarqawi's entry, though it is likely that he arrived around the same time." He was also quoted as saying that after Zarqawi entered the country, he "began to form a terrorist cell, even though the Iraqi services do not have precise information on his entry into the country." Allawi told Al-Hayat that this information was discovered by the Iraqi secret service in the archives of the Saddam Hussein regime.

==== 23 May, Beirut ====
Iyad Allawi, in an interview with Al-Hayat, stated that Saddam's government "sponsored" the birth of al-Qaeda in Iraq, coordinating with other terrorist groups, both Arab and Muslim. Allawi was quoted as saying, "The Iraqi secret services had links to these groups through a person called Faruq Hajizi, later named Iraq's ambassador to Turkey and arrested after the fall of Saddam's regime as he tried to re-enter Iraq. Iraqi secret agents helped terrorists enter the country and directed them to the Ansar al-Islam camps in the Halbija area."

==== 23 May, Iran ====
Seif al-Adl, the leader of al-Qaeda's security committee, published a testament on the internet about Abu Musab al-Zarqawi, the Jordanian terrorist in Iraq who swore allegiance to bin Laden in October 2004. Among other things, the al-Qaeda leader clarified the relationship between Zarqawi's group and the new Iraq:

Contrary to what the Americans continuously claimed, al-Qaeda did not have any connection with Saddam whatsoever. American attempts to connect Saddam to al-Qaeda were in order to create excuses and legitimate causes to invade Iraq. So after we were trapped in Iran, after being forced out of Afghanistan, it became inevitable that we would plan to enter Iraq through the north, which was free from American control. It was then that we moved south to join our Sunni brothers.

Al-Adl described the US invasion of Iraq as a boon to al-Qaeda: "The Americans took the bait and fell into our trap."

==== July, New York City ====
Corporal Jonathan "Paco" Reese of the Pennsylvania National Guard, one of the Americans responsible for guarding the captured Saddam Hussein when he was in American custody, told GQ magazine that the ousted leader insisted that he had no relationship with Osama bin Laden.

==== 8 September, Washington DC ====
Former US Secretary of State Colin Powell was interviewed on ABC and told Barbara Walters that his February 2003 speech to the United Nations was "a blot" on his record, saying, "There were some people in the intelligence community who knew at that time that some of these sources were not good, and shouldn't be relied upon, and they didn't speak up. That devastated me." Asked specifically about a connection between Saddam and al-Qaeda, Powell responded, "I have never seen a connection. ... I can't think otherwise because I'd never seen evidence to suggest there was one."

==== 26 October ====
In Newsweek, Michael Isikoff and Mark Hosenball described a "secret draft CIA report" which stated, according to "two counterterrorism analysts familiar with the classified CIA study who asked not to be identified", that:

Zarqawi probably did travel to the Iraqi capital in the spring of 2002 for medical treatment. And, of course, there is no question that he is in Iraq now-orchestrating many of the deadly suicide bombings and attacks on American soldiers. But before the American-led invasion, Saddam's government may never have known he was there. The reason: he used an alias and was there under what one US intelligence official calls a 'false cover.' No evidence has been found showing senior Iraqi officials were even aware of his presence.

==== 6 November ====
The New York Times reported the contents of a newly declassified memo apparently supplied by Senator Carl Levin of Michigan, the top Democrat on the Senate Armed Services Committee. The document provided the earliest and strongest indication that American intelligence agencies had voiced doubts about the reliability of Ibn al-Shaykh al-Libi, an al-Qaeda official in American custody. According to the article:

Without mentioning him by name, President Bush, Vice President Dick Cheney, Colin L. Powell, then secretary of state, and other administration officials repeatedly cited Mr. Libi's information as 'credible' evidence that Iraq was training Al-Qaeda members in the use of explosives and illicit weapons.

==== 22 November ====
The National Journal described the existence of the highly classified 21 September 2001 PDB, which informed President Bush that there was no credible evidence of collaboration between Saddam Hussein's Iraq and Al-Qaeda.

==== December ====
Vanity Fair published an excerpt of counterterrorism expert Peter Bergen's new book, which cited Pakistani biographer Hamid Mir's interview with Osama bin Laden. Regarding Saddam Hussein, Mir commented that bin Laden "condemned Saddam Hussein ... He gave such kind of abuses that it was very difficult for me to write."

==== 9 December ====
The New York Times continued to report on the questionable nature of al-Libi's statements regarding ties between Saddam Hussein and Al-Qaeda, stating that "current and former government officials" had described:

A classified Defense Intelligence Agency report issued in February 2002 that expressed skepticism about Mr. Libi's credibility on questions related to Iraq and Al-Qaeda ... based in part on the knowledge that he was no longer in American custody when he made the detailed statements, and that he might have been subjected to harsh treatment. ... They said the C.I.A.'s decision to withdraw the intelligence based on Mr. Libi's claims had been made because of his later assertions, beginning in January 2004, that he had fabricated them to obtain better treatment from his captors. ... American officials had not previously acknowledged either that Mr. Libi made the false statements in foreign custody or that Mr. Libi contended that his statements had been coerced.

=== 2006 ===
==== 3 January ====
CNN terrorism expert Peter Bergen's book The Osama bin Laden I Know was published. Christina Lamb, the foreign affairs correspondent for the Sunday Times, noted that the book "makes clear that [bin Laden] had no link with Saddam Hussein. On the contrary, he told his childhood friend Batarfi, 'This guy can never be trusted.'" In the book, Bergen discussed his conversations with bin Laden's Pakistani biographer Hamid Mir. Among other things, Mir told Bergen that bin Laden cursed Saddam, and said "the land of the Arab world, the land is like a mother, and Saddam Hussein is fucking his mother."

==== 4 January ====
Newsweek published information about a recently declassified slide-show presentation prepared for a secret Pentagon briefing about possible links between Saddam and al-Qaeda in 2002. The slides included previously unpublished information about allegations that Mohamed Atta had met an Iraqi official in April 2001. While Deroy Murdock claimed that the slides were new evidence that the meeting might have occurred, Newsweek then reported that "four former senior intel officials who monitored investigations into Atta's alleged Iraqi contacts say they never heard the airport anecdote." Another intelligence official "rejected" the anecdotal evidence. Newsweek concluded that the briefing "helped keep the tale alive" even though it had been rejected by intelligence experts.

==== 9 January ====
Paul Bremer published My Year in Iraq, a memoir of his time as administrator of the Coalition Provisional Authority. He wrote:

The secret Mukhabarat document I'd seen back in July showed that Saddam had made plans for an insurgency. And the insurgency had forces to draw on from among several thousand hardened Baathists in two northern Republican Guard divisions that had joined forces with foreign jihadis.

==== 21 January ====
A videotape of Osama bin Laden was released in which the bin Laden addressed American citizens, claiming that the American invasion of Iraq had led to a situation in which "there is no difference between this criminality and Saddam's criminality."

==== 11 February ====
US Representative Pete Hoekstra (R-Mich), chairman of the House Permanent Select Committee on Intelligence, appeared on MSNBC to discuss the "Saddam Tapes," of which some 12 hours were shown at The Intelligence Summit conference from 17 to 21 February. Reports claimed that the tapes featured Saddam discussing WMDs and links to terrorists. Hoekstra called for the US government to put the remaining 35,000 boxes of documents on the internet so Arabic speakers around the world could help translate the documents. Attorney John Loftus, the controversial president of the Intelligence Summit, claimed the tapes provided evidence that Saddam had ties to terrorists. Representative Hoekstra later said he felt the tapes were primarily of "historical interest" and cautioned, "I tried to stay away from whatever claims Loftus was making."

==== 14 February, New York ====
The Combating Terrorism Center at West Point published a study of al-Qaeda titled Harmony and Disharmony: Exploiting al-Qa'ida's Organizational Vulnerabilities. The study was based on documents from the CTC's Harmony Database, which contained material that had been seized from al-Qaeda and recently declassified. One of the papers examineed the lessons learned from jihad in Syria; the al-Qaeda writer concluded that the influence of secular Baathist thinking distorted the message of jihad. This writer advised the movement no longer to allow the jihad message to be influenced by the Iraqi Baath message. The writer called the Iraqi and Syrian Baath parties "renegades" and noted that "the alliance with them was catastrophic." He also noted that these parties had "no influence or effect on the battle field." The writer identified Saddam's Iraq as one of the "apostate regimes that abandoned Islam." Another document in the collection listed Saddam, along with Yasser Arafat and Gulbuddin Hikmatyar, among Islamic leaders who lack "manhood" and suggested that "they are useless. Beware of them."

==== 15 February ====
The ABC television news program Nightline aired translations of taped, candid conversations between Saddam Hussein and his advisors. On the ABC transcript of one of the tapes, Saddam was heard discussing terrorism and weapons of mass destruction with Deputy Prime Minister Tariq Aziz. Saddam specifically mentioned that he had warned the United States in 1989, when the two countries were allies, that terrorists would eventually gain access to weapons of mass destruction, saying, "terrorism is coming." He continued:

I told the Americans a long time before 2 August [1990, the day Iraq invaded Kuwait and the US/Iraqi relationship changed dramatically] and told the British as well, I think Hamed was there keeping the meeting minutes with one of them, that in the future there will be terrorism with weapons of mass destruction. What prevents this technology from developing and people from smuggling it? All of this, before the stories of smuggling, before that, in 1989. I told them, 'In the future, what would prevent that we see a booby-trapped car causing a nuclear explosion in Washington or a germ or a chemical one?'

Saddam later added, "This is coming, this story is coming but not from Iraq." Reporter Sherrie Gossett wrote that the excerpts of the tapes presented at the Intelligence Summit were "vague, cryptic, nonsensical, insignificant" and noted that "the most-hyped excerpts are also subject to wide-ranging interpretations." A spokeswoman for John Negroponte, the Directorate of National Intelligence, said that "Intelligence community analysts from the CIA and the DIA reviewed the translations and found that while fascinating from a historical perspective, the tapes do not reveal anything that changes their postwar analysis of Iraq's weapons programs, nor do they change the findings contained in the comprehensive Iraq Survey Group report."

==== 23 February ====
Abdel Bari Atwan published a book titled The Secret History of Al-Qa'ida. In it, he wrote:

Like Zarqawi, many Arabs fleeing American retaliation in Afghanistan after 9/11 found refuge with Ansar al-Islam. But then came an unexpected development. According to Dr Muhammad al-Masari, a Saudi specialist on Al-Qaeda's ideology, Saddam established contact with the 'Afghan Arabs' as early as 2001, believing he would be targeted by the US once the Taliban was routed. In this version, disputed by other commentators, Saddam funded Al-Qaeda operatives to move into Iraq with the proviso that they would not undermine his regime. Sources close to the Ba'ath regime have told me that Saddam also used to send messengers to buy small plots of land from farmers in Sunni areas. In the middle of the night soldiers would bury arms and money caches for later use by the resistance.

According to Masari, Saddam saw that Islam would be key to a cohesive resistance in the event of invasion. Iraqi army commanders were ordered to become practising Muslims and to adopt the language and spirit of the jihadis. On arrival in Iraq, Al-Qaeda operatives were put in touch with these commanders, who later facilitated the distribution of arms and money from Saddam's caches. Most commentators agree that Al-Qaeda was present in Iraq before the US invasion. The question is for how long and to what extent. What is known is that Zarqawi took a direct role in Al-Qaeda's infiltration. In March 2003 – it is not clear whether this was before or after the invasion began – he met Al-Qaeda's military strategist, an Egyptian called Muhammad Ibrahim Makkawi, and agreed to assist Al-Qaeda operatives entering Iraq.

==== 16 March ====
The Pentagon, at the request of the Office of the Director of National Intelligence, began releasing the Arabic-language documents obtained during the invasions of Iraq and Afghanistan. The documents had been hailed by some supporters of the invasion as a possible "smoking gun" connecting Saddam's Iraq to al-Qaeda terrorists, and Representative Hoekstra had been calling for their release to the public. Those released so far, however, failed to provide evidence of any such connection. According to Steven Aftergood of the Federation of American Scientists, the release of the documents "looks like an effort to discover a retrospective justification for the war in Iraq." The Pentagon cautioned that the government "has made no determination regarding the authenticity of the documents, validity or factual accuracy of the information contained therein, or the quality of any translations, when available."

One of the documents, which Stephen F. Hayes had claimed in January to be proof that "thousands" of al-Qaeda terrorists were trained in Iraq between 1999 and 2002 to fight in Afghanistan, was, according to the Pentagon, simply an investigation of a rumor. The Pentagon synopsis of the document read: "Fedayeen Saddam received news of a rumor that 3,000 volunteers from Iraq and Saudi Arabia had traveled to Afghanistan to fight with the Mujahideen against the US. This letter is a request to investigate the rumor to determine whether it is true."

Also present in the collection was Iraqi Intelligence correspondence from 2002 concerning suspected al-Qaeda members in Iraq. The document included names and photographs of suspected al-Qaeda members, including Abu Musab al-Zarqawi. The Pentagon summary of the document indicated that Iraqi intelligence suspected these people to be members of al-Qaeda, but provided no indication that they trained or supported them. Indeed, an Associated Press translation of the document suggested that the letter warned Iraqi agents to "be on the lookout" for Zarqawi and other al-Qaeda agents; the AP reported that "Attached were three responses in which agents said there was no evidence al-Zarqawi or the other man were in Iraq." A third document, dated 15 September 2001, described what an Afghan informant told Iraqi intelligence about statements made by Afghan consul Ahmed Dahastani. According to ABC news, the informant stated that Dahastani told him:

That OBL and the Taliban are in contact with Iraq and that a group of Taliban and bin Laden group members visited Iraq. That the US has proof the Iraqi government and 'bin Laden's group' agreed to cooperate to attack targets inside America. That in case the Taliban and bin Laden's group turn out to be involved in 'these destructive operations,' the US may strike Iraq and Afghanistan. That the Afghan consul heard about the issue of Iraq's relationship with 'bin Laden's group' while he was in Iran.

While stating that "the controversial claim that Osama bin Laden was cooperating with Saddam Hussein is an ongoing matter of intense debate ... [and that] the assertions contained in this document clearly support the claim," ABC questioned the sourcing of the document and concluded that "without further corroboration, this document is of limited evidentiary value." The Los Angeles Times noted that "the documents do not appear to offer any new evidence of illicit activity by Hussein, or hint at preparations for the insurgency that followed the invasion."

The Associated Press translated a letter from an Iraqi intelligence official dated 17 August 2002, obtained from the Operation Iraqi Freedom documents, which asked agents in the country to be on the lookout for Abu Musab al-Zarqawi and another unnamed man whose picture was attached. The letter said there were reports the two could be in Iraq and directed Iraqi security officials to be on the alert as a matter of "top priority." Attached were three responses in which agents said there was no evidence al-Zarqawi or the other man were in Iraq. ABC news translated the same documents and reported that in correspondences dated August 2002:

The letter on page seven ... says that information coming from 'a trustworthy source' indicates that subjects who are interested in dealing with al-Qaeda are in Iraq and have several passports. Follow up on the presence of those subjects is ordered, as well as a comparison of their pictures with those of Jordanian subjects living in Iraq. (This may be referring to pictures of Abu Musaab al Zarqawi and another man on pages 4–6.)

ABC wrote that "The document does not support allegations that Iraq was colluding with al-Qaeda." The Army's Foreign Military Studies Office website translated the letter to say:

The IIS [TC: Iraqi Intelligence Service], General Director ordered the following: 1- Instructing your sources to continue their surveillance of the above-mentioned individuals in your area of operations and inform us once you initiate such action. 2- Coordinate with Directorate 18 to verify the photographs of the above-mentioned with photos of the members of the Jordanian community within your area of operations. 3- Conduct a comprehensive survey of all tourist facilities (hotels, furnished apartments, and leased homes). Give this matter your utmost attention. Keep us informed.

==== 28 March ====
CNN terrorism expert Peter L. Bergen wrote an op-ed in The New York Times addressing the release of the Operation Iraqi Freedom documents, noting a significant problem for proponents of the theory of Saddam/al-Qaeda collaboration: "Another striking feature about the supposed Qaeda-Iraq connection is that since the fall of the Taliban, not one of the thousands of documents found in Afghanistan substantiate such an alliance, even though Al-Qaeda was a highly bureaucratic organization that required potential recruits to fill out application forms."

==== 18 May ====
Former NSA Chief General Michael Hayden testified before the Senate Hearing on his nomination as Director of Central Intelligence. During the hearing, Hayden was questioned by Senator Carl Levin (D-MI) on the pressure exerted by former Under Secretary of Defense for Policy Douglas Feith's Office on the intelligence community over the question of Saddam's links to al-Qaeda. Hayden explained that he was not comfortable with Feith's analysis: "I got three great kids, but if you tell me go out and find all the bad things they've done, Hayden, I can build you a pretty good dossier, and you'd think they were pretty bad people, because that was I was looking for and that's what I'd build up. That would be very wrong. That would be inaccurate. That would be misleading." He also acknowledged that after "repeated inquiries from the Feith office" he had put a disclaimer on NSA intelligence assessments of Iraq/al-Qaeda contacts.

==== 8 June ====
The Washington Post quoted a Jordanian security official saying that documents recovered after the overthrow of Saddam showed that Iraqi agents detained some of Zarqawi's operatives but released them after questioning. He also told the Post that the Iraqis warned the Zarqawi operatives that the Jordanians knew where they were.

==== 16 June ====
Fox News posted on its website the translation of a 76-page notebook belonging to an Iraqi Intelligence Service (IIS) agent named Khaled Abd El Majid, released as part of the Operation Iraqi Freedom documents. The translation process was supervised by Ray Robison, a former Army officer, who claimed that the document detailed a meeting between an unnamed Iraqi official and Maulana Fazlur Rahman, a Pakistani cleric known for his close ties to Afghanistan's ousted Taliban regime.

The meeting allegedly took place on 28 November 1999. While the Taliban harbored al-Qaeda and Osama bin Laden beginning in 1996, and until Operation Enduring Freedom, the notebook translation made no reference to al-Qaeda. According to the translation by Robison's team, Rahman stated the following:

And he (Mullah Omar) desires to get closer relations with Iraq and that Iraq may help us in reducing our problems. Now we are facing America and Russia. He requested the possibility of Iraq intervening to build a friendship with Russia since Russia is no more the number one enemy. And we request Iraq's help from a brotherly point of view. They are ready for this matter and they prefer that the relation between Iraq and Taliban be an independent relation from Hekmatyar's relation with the Taliban. We want practical steps concerning this issue and especially the relationship with the Taliban and (not clear, but could be Iraq) ... Concerning the relations between the Taliban and Iraq I was informed that they are going to start those relations in a secret manner and they are waiting for the answer and I will inform them that you will answer them through the embassy (translator's note: could be through the Iraqi embassy of Kabul, if they had one, or Islamabad in Pakistan).

The notebook also contained a transcript of a meeting between Maulana Fazlur Rahman and Taha Yassin Ramadan, the former vice president of Iraq. At this meeting, Rahman told the vice president:

I met Mullah Omar the leader of Afghanistan and he welcomed the establishment of Islamic relations with Iraq and we foresee to tell them about our needs and they would like to have contacts with Russia but they feel that the Russians (unclear) with Afghanistan, they go to America (RR: probably means that the Russians side with the US against the Taliban). And they (RR: probably the Taliban) say that now we do not feel that Russia is our enemy and we do not know why they support the Northern Alliance (RR: non-Pashtun Afghani militant groups seeking to topple the Taliban). They (RR: probably the Taliban) want Iraq to intervene with Russia.

According to the translation conducted by Robison's team, Rahman and Ramadan were quoted as saying:

Fazlur Rahman: What is happening in Afghanistan is a violation of the human rights of this country, where Usama bin Laden is one person and the fate of millions cannot be tied to him. (Translator's note: Probably at that time the US is forcing sanctions or pressures on Afghanistan because it is providing sanctuary to bin Laden)

Vice President: Can you blockade a country (RR: probably Afghanistan) because of the presence of one man (RR: probably referring to UBL)? This time she (America) got the resolution from the Security Council and it is number 77 (or 771) (RR: probably Security Council Resolution 771 in 1992 concerning Bosnia) relative to Iraq (RR: probably is making a comparison between 771 and a new resolution on Iraq most likely UNSCR 1284 passed Dec 1999 about WMD and humanitarian efforts). And it is the first time that the parliament of a country (US Congress) speaks after a resolution (unclear) and comes out through the Security Council. It is ignorant to send memos and complain to the Security Council because it is a tool in the hands of America the master of oppression and if we do that it does not mean that we are boycotting the diplomatic process. Also the monetary fund (Translator's note: probably the International Monetary Fund) is in the hand of America and she helps according to her interests. My personal stand is with his (RR: probably UBL) call to fight America.

At the end of the meeting, the vice president was quoted as saying "I gave Mr. President an overview about Afghanistan and its issues."

==== 6 July ====
An apparent training manual for Arab operatives working inside Afghanistan, recovered in an Iraqi government computer file and written before 11 September 2001, was translated by Fox News. One of the instructions stated, "In rest areas a brother should not show his military ID." The training manual also instructed Arab operatives inside Afghanistan to dress like Afghan tribesmen, to avoid being followed ("Routine is the enemy of security"), to always be armed, and "to behave as if enemies would strike at any moment." The manual also cautioned Arabs to "beware of rapid and spontaneous friendships with Afghans who speak Arabic," and "always make sure about the identity of your neighbors and classify them as regular people, opponents or allies." In his analysis of the document, Ray Robison stated:

The document also appears to be a professional military intelligence letter of instruction. These men have military IDs. The instruction references an intelligence manual. The letter mentions 'trusted' Afghans, so we know they are working in cooperation with forces in Afghanistan. It is highly unlikely that any military would send a semi-permanent contingent with families into Afghanistan for cooperation or training unless the Afghan organization was stable and in control. It therefore seems likely that these soldiers are working closely with the Taliban.

==== 8 September, Washington, DC ====
The Senate Select Committee on Intelligence released two reports constituting Phase II of its study of pre-war intelligence claims regarding Iraq's pursuit of WMDs and alleged links to al-Qaeda, entitled "Postwar Findings about Iraq's WMD Programs and Links to Terrorism and How they Compare with Prewar Assessments" and "The Use by the Intelligence Community of Information Provided by the Iraqi National Congress". The reports concluded that, in the words of The New York Times, "there is no evidence that Saddam Hussein had prewar ties to Al-Qaeda and one of the terror organization's most notorious members, Abu Musab al-Zarqawi."

The "Postwar Findings" volume of the study concluded that there was no evidence of any Iraqi support of al-Qaeda, al-Zarqawi, or Ansar al-Islam. The "Iraqi National Congress" volume concluded that "false information" from INC-affiliated sources was used to justify key claims in the prewar intelligence debate and that this information was "widely distributed in intelligence products" prior to the war. It also concluded that the INC "attempted to influence US policy on Iraq by providing false information through defectors directed at convincing the United States that Iraq possessed weapons of mass destruction and had links to terrorists." The Senate report noted that in October 2002, "the DIA cautioned that the INC was penetrated by hostile intelligence services and would use the relationship to promote its own agenda."

==== 14 September, Washington, DC ====
In a speech to the Brookings Institution, the Kurdish Deputy Prime Minister of Iraq, Barham Salih, who was imprisoned in Saddam's Iraq, contradicted the Senate Report, asserting that, "The alliance between the Baathists and jihadists which sustains Al-Qaeda in Iraq is not new, contrary to what you may have been told. I know this at firsthand. Some of my friends were murdered by jihadists, by Al-Qaeda-affiliated operatives who had been sheltered and assisted by Saddam's regime." He was referring to Ansar al-Islam, an organization that the Senate Committee concluded that Saddam's government spied on, but did not support.

Salih claimed to have presented the CIA with evidence in 2002 of an assassination attempt against him by Ansar al-Islam that was funded by Saddam's Republican Guard. Salih acknowledged he "could not prove this in a court of law, but this is intelligence." The Senate Report concluded that prewar interactions between Saddam Hussein's government and Ansar al-Islam were attempts by Saddam to spy on the group rather than to support or work with them. "Postwar information reveals that Baghdad viewed Ansar al-Islam as a threat to the regime and that the IIS attempted to collect intelligence on the group."

=== 2007 ===
In February 2007, a Pentagon Inspector General report found that Douglas J. Feith, who was under secretary of Defense for Policy for United States president George W. Bush from 2001 to 2005, "developed, produced, and then disseminated alternative intelligence assessments on the Iraq and al Qaida relationship, which included some conclusions that were inconsistent with the consensus of the Intelligence Community, to senior decision-makers."
