= Operation Iraqi Freedom documents =

Operation Iraqi Freedom 2003 documents are some 48,000 boxes of documents, audiotapes and videotapes that were discovered by the U.S. military during the 2003 invasion of Iraq. The documents date from the 1980s through the post-Saddam period. In March 2006, the U.S. government, at the urging of members of Congress, made them available online at its (Foreign Military Studies Office) website, requesting Arabic translators around the world to help in the translation.

In early November 2006, the entire set of documents was removed. Media reports stated that the website was taken offline because of security concerns regarding the posting of sophisticated diagrams and other information regarding (nuclear weapon) design prior to the 1991 Persian Gulf war.

== Origins ==
The Ba'athists were said to be "meticulous record-keepers." The documents were found in government offices in Iraq and Afghanistan. A debate ensued inside the government regarding whether these documents should be released to the public. Because the documents were not being made public through the normal channels, certain documents began to leak out through unconventional channels.

The first set of documents was released to an online media outlet called Cybercast News Service. A second set of documents was released to The Intelligence Summit, an international intelligence conference that resulted in an ABC story on some of the audiotapes of Saddam Hussein talking to his top officials. A spokeswoman for John Negroponte, the Director of National Intelligence, noted that "Intelligence community analysts from the CIA and the DIA reviewed the translations and found that while fascinating from a historical perspective, the tapes do not reveal anything that changes their postwar analysis of Iraq's weapons programs, nor do they change the findings contained in the comprehensive Iraq Survey Group report."

Congressman Pete Hoekstra, the chairman of the House Intelligence Committee, described the rationale for the public disclosure of the documents as follows:

"We're hoping to unleash the power of the Internet, unleash the power of the blogosphere, to get through these documents and give us a better understanding of what was going on in Iraq before the war".

Negroponte at first tried to delay the release of the documents, but softened his opposition to releasing after conversations with Hoekstra. President Bush directed Negroponte to release the documents and they were slowly being made available until they were taken offline in November 2006 due to security concerns (see below).

The website issued a warning that:

the US Government has made no determination regarding the authenticity of the documents, validity or factual accuracy of the information contained therein, or the quality of any translations, when available.

While the government has made an effort to keep known forgeries out of the set of documents posted to the web, a senior intelligence official observed that "the database included 'a fair amount of forgeries,' sold by Iraqi hustlers or concocted by Iraqis opposed to Mr. Hussein." A congressional inquiry covered many of the accuracy concerns on April 6, 2006 and while the multiple reviews aimed at keeping forgeries out do not rise to the level of a guarantee of authenticity, a good faith effort has apparently been made to clean out forgeries.

According to Steven Aftergood of the Federation of American Scientists, the release of the documents "looks like an effort to discover a retrospective justification for the war in Iraq." The Pentagon cautioned that the government "has made no determination regarding the authenticity of the documents, validity or factual accuracy of the information contained therein, or the quality of any translations, when available." The Los Angeles Times notes that "the documents do not appear to offer any new evidence of illicit activity by Hussein, or hint at preparations for the insurgency that followed the invasion."

The Republican-controlled Senate Select Committee on Intelligence concluded in a report released in September 2006 that "The Defense Intelligence Agency (DIA), which is leading the exploitation effort of documents (DocEx) uncovered in Iraq, told Committee staff that 120 million plus pages of documents that were recovered in Iraq have received an initial review for intelligence information. [...] DIA officials explicitly stated that they did not believe that the initial review process missed any documents of major significance regarding Iraq's links to terrorism. During an interview with Committee staff, the lead DIA analyst who follows the issue of possible connections between the Iraqi government and al-Qa'ida noted that the DIA 'continues to maintain that there was no partnership between the two organizations'".

== Analysis of the approach ==
Releasing the documents over the Internet to gain the help of translators around the world was an idea pushed by Congressman Pete Hoekstra. After the documents were taken offline, however, Representative Hoekstra blamed the administration for following this advice: "Well, you know, we have a process in place. It looks like they screwed up."

Former CIA and State Department counterterrorism expert Larry C. Johnson said, "It's like putting firearms in the hands of children. The problem is that the documents without context aren't going to tell you a lot." Johnson also noted that "it's also an indictment of the intelligence community. They don't have the resources ... they haven't got the time to go through this stuff."

Other experts have suggested that the problem is that bloggers will cherry-pick information from the documents to solidify their own perspectives without putting the tidbits they find in an overall historical context. Former CIA terrorism specialist Michael Scheuer pointed this out in an interview with the New York Times: "There's no quality control. You'll have guys out there with a smattering of Arabic drawing all kinds of crazy conclusions. Rush Limbaugh will cherry-pick from the right, and Al Franken will cherry-pick from the left."

According to history professor Fritz Umbach, the document archive has been seeded "with suggestive jihadist materials" unrelated to the war in Iraq, and cites specific examples. In a Salon.com article, Umbach claims to have identified "approximately 40 files that are either completely unrelated to Iraq, or that are related only through jihadist elements of the insurgency that began after Saddam's fall." He also notes that the archive website was linked "to an entirely unrelated database of al-Qaida materials", the Harmony database, creating confusion over documents suggestive of a link between Iraq and al-Qaeda. Umbach writes, "Whether intentional or not, the conflation and confusion of materials has been more than sufficient to convince bloggers on the political right that there were, as Bush officials insisted, operational links between Saddam's Iraq and al-Qaida."

== Iraqi Perspectives Project ==
After the fall of Baghdad, the United States Joint Forces Command commissioned a study of the inner workings and behavior of Saddam's regime, referred to as the Iraqi Perspectives Project. The study authors drew on many of the Iraqi Freedom documents, together with interviews with dozens of captured senior Iraqi military and political leaders, and summarized the study's key findings in a Foreign Affairs article, and have also made their full report available.

The study's findings represent the analysis of many of the Iraqi Freedom documents and related interviews. In particular, the project concluded that:

1. Saddam's secretive and authoritarian government, together with his paranoia, rendered the Iraqi army grossly unprepared for conflict with coalition forces;
2. Saddam grossly miscalculated the ability of his contacts with the Russian, French, Chinese and other governments to prevent military action against Iraq, and
3. although Iraq almost certainly did not possess weapons of mass destruction, Saddam's desire to preserve ambiguity on the issue, together with his government's secrecy and previous attempts to deceive UN inspectors made it difficult for Iraq to convince the world that it had disarmed. For more information, see Iraqi Perspectives Project.

The study also cites documents demonstrating that key evidence presented by Colin Powell to the United Nations in February 2003 had been severely misinterpreted by the U.S. government. Audiotapes played by Powell during his presentation, cited by Powell as evidence of Iraqi attempts to circumvent U.N. regulations on WMD, were reexamined in light of the new documents. According to the authors of the study:

Ironically, it now appears that some of the actions resulting from Saddam's new policy of cooperation actually helped solidify the coalition's case for war. Over the years, Western intelligence services had obtained many internal Iraqi communications, among them a 1996 memorandum from the director of the Iraqi Intelligence Service directing all subordinates to "insure that there is no equipment, materials, research, studies, or books related to manufacturing of the prohibited weapons (chemical, biological, nuclear, and missiles) in your site." And when UN inspectors went to these research and storage locations, they inevitably discovered lingering evidence of WMD-related programs. In 2002, therefore, when the United States intercepted a message between two Iraqi Republican Guard Corps commanders discussing the removal of the words "nerve agents" from "the wireless instructions," or learned of instructions to "search the area surrounding the headquarters camp and [the unit] for any chemical agents, make sure the area is free of chemical containers, and write a report on it," U.S. analysts viewed this information through the prism of a decade of prior deceit. They had no way of knowing that this time the information reflected the regime's attempt to ensure it was in compliance with UN resolutions. What was meant to prevent suspicion thus ended up heightening it.

== Website closure ==
In November 2006, the documents were removed from the Internet by the Office of the Director of National Intelligence. The U.S. government had already received warnings about the site's content from the International Atomic Energy Agency, who was specifically concerned about sensitive documents about the pre-1991 Iraqi nuclear program, but the documents were not removed until the New York Times informed the government that it would be publishing an article about the sensitive material. The New York Times called the material a "nuclear primer" because it included about a dozen documents in Arabic that contained "charts, diagrams, equations and lengthy narratives about bomb building that nuclear experts who have viewed them say go beyond what is available elsewhere on the Internet and in other public forums. For instance, the papers give detailed information on how to build nuclear firing circuits and triggering explosives, as well as the radioactive cores of atom bombs." The fear was that these documents would give Iraq's nuclear secrets to Iran and thus aid the Iranian WMD program.

Some criticized the Times for publishing the article. But Joseph Cirincione, director for nonproliferation at the Center for American Progress, pointed out that the Times had not put the documents online: "The journalists are the heroes. They got the stuff pulled down. This is what we want our journalists to be doing, to exposing these kind of abuses of power. Its Chairman Hoekstra and Chairman Roberts who insisted, against all the evidence, against everything we know, against what David Kay has told us, what the Iraq survey group has told us, there was no nuclear, chemical, or biological weapons in Iraq. They were desperate to try and prove that case, somehow justify this extremely costly and catastrophic war. It's their zealotry that's caused the harm, not investigative journalism."

== About select documents ==
Several news stories about some of the documents were published after their release.

- Document BIAP 2003-000654 was translated by Joseph Shahda and generated an article in the Weekly Standard. The document is a memo from the commander of an Iraqi Air Force base requesting a list of "the names of those who desire to volunteer for Suicide Mission to liberate Palestine and to strike American Interests."
- Document IZSP-2003-00001122, signed by a Ba'ath Party official, indicates that the Iraqis were worried about the Americans smuggling in and planting weapons of mass destruction (specifically, mobile weapons labs) in order to justify the invasion.
- Document ISGZ 2004-019920 is a letter from Iraqi Intelligence in 2002 warning agents to be on the lookout for Jordanian terrorist Abu Musab al-Zarqawi. The letter warns that Zarqawi and another individual are in Iraq and states that apprehending them is a "top priority". According to the Associated Press (16 March 2006), "Attached were three responses in which agents said there was no evidence al-Zarqawi or the other man were in Iraq." ABC notes that "The document does not support allegations that Iraq was colluding with al Qaeda."
- A series of "Sheen 27" documents show Saddam's regime was very involved in training fighters in the use of "improvised explosive devices" or IEDs. In a news report by Laurie Mylroie, several documents are discussed that speak of "Arab Fedayeen" (i.e. non-Iraqis) and the use of "of the people" bombs. Mylroie asserts that one of the documents that was posted was then taken down. The authors of the Iraqi Perspectives Project discussed these documents both in the report and in a hearing before the U.S. House of Representatives (6 April 2006), indicating that Saddam was training a secular pan-Arab army. They wrote in the Foreign Affairs article about the documents, "In the years preceding the coalition invasion, Iraq's leaders had become enamored of the belief that the spirit of the Fedayeen's 'Arab warriors' would allow them to overcome the Americans' advantages. In the end, however, the Fedayeen fighters proved totally unprepared for the kind of war they were asked to fight, and they died by the thousands." In the House hearing on this matter, defense analyst Lieutenant Colonel Kevin M. Woods noted that Saddam began recruiting foreign fighters into this army in the mid-1990s, and he described them as part of an "Arab liberation movement" that had been "part of Baath political philosophy going back to the beginnings of Saddam's regime."
- Other documents concern election laws in France, including correspondence from Iraqi intelligence "ordering the translation of important parts of a 1997 report about campaign financing laws in France." ABC claims that these documents suggest Saddam's "strong interest in the mechanics and legalities of financial contributions to French politicians."
- One Iraqi document purportedly details a meeting on February 19, 1995, in which a representative of Iraq met in Sudan with Osama Bin Laden, who suggested "carrying out joint operations against foreign forces" in Saudi Arabia. Eight months later, al-Qaeda operatives killed five U.S. military advisors in Saudi Arabia. There has been no evidence or suggestion of Iraqi complicity in that attack or linkage to the February meeting. ABC News, who reported on this document, further notes that "The document does not establish that the two parties did in fact enter into an operational relationship." ABC also cautions that "this document is handwritten and has no official seal."
- Another document claims that Russia had a mole inside the U.S. military who gave the Russians information regarding U.S. troop movements, information that was then forwarded to the Iraqi military. The Russians deny the story and some of the information the Russians reportedly passed to the Iraqis was incorrect. According to ABC, "A Pentagon study released today concludes, however, that the information didn't do Saddam Hussein any good because he never acted it on though it proved to be accurate."
- Another document suggests that the Iraqi government planned to respond to the 2003 U.S. invasion of Iraq with "camels of mass destruction"—camels fitted with suicide bombs that would meet the invading army. In another document, Saddam's son Qusay orders captured Kuwaitis to be used as "human shields" against the invaders.
- Document 2RAD-2004-601189-ELC, is given the synopsis: "Abu-Zubaydah Statement on the Capability of al-Qaidah to Manufacture and Deliver Nuclear Weapons to the U.S." Abu Zubaydah was captured in Pakistan in March 2002 and is believed to be the highest-ranking member of al-Qaeda to be held. There is no indication that this document links Abu Zubaydah to Iraq in any way. Professor Fritz Umbach notes, "the 'statement' itself is nothing more than an Arabic summary of a 2002 CBS News story on Zubaydah's claims. It has no identifiable link to Iraq, other than the odd fact that it appears on a U.S. government site billed as Operation Iraqi Freedom Documents."
- Many of the documents seem to make clear that Saddam's regime had given up on seeking a WMD capability by the mid-1990s. As AP reported, "Repeatedly in the transcripts, Saddam and his lieutenants remind each other that Iraq destroyed its chemical and biological weapons in the early 1990s, and shut down those programs and the nuclear-bomb program, which had never produced a weapon." At one 1996 presidential meeting, top weapons program official Amer Mohammed Rashid, describes his conversation with UN weapons inspector Rolf Ekeus: "We don't have anything to hide, so we're giving you all the details." At another meeting Saddam told his deputies, "We cooperated with the resolutions 100 percent and you all know that, and the 5 percent they claim we have not executed could take them 10 years to (verify). Don't think for a minute that we still have WMD. We have nothing."
