= Iraqi Perspectives Project =

The Iraqi Perspectives Project is a research effort conducted by United States Joint Forces Command, focusing on Operation Iraqi Freedom.

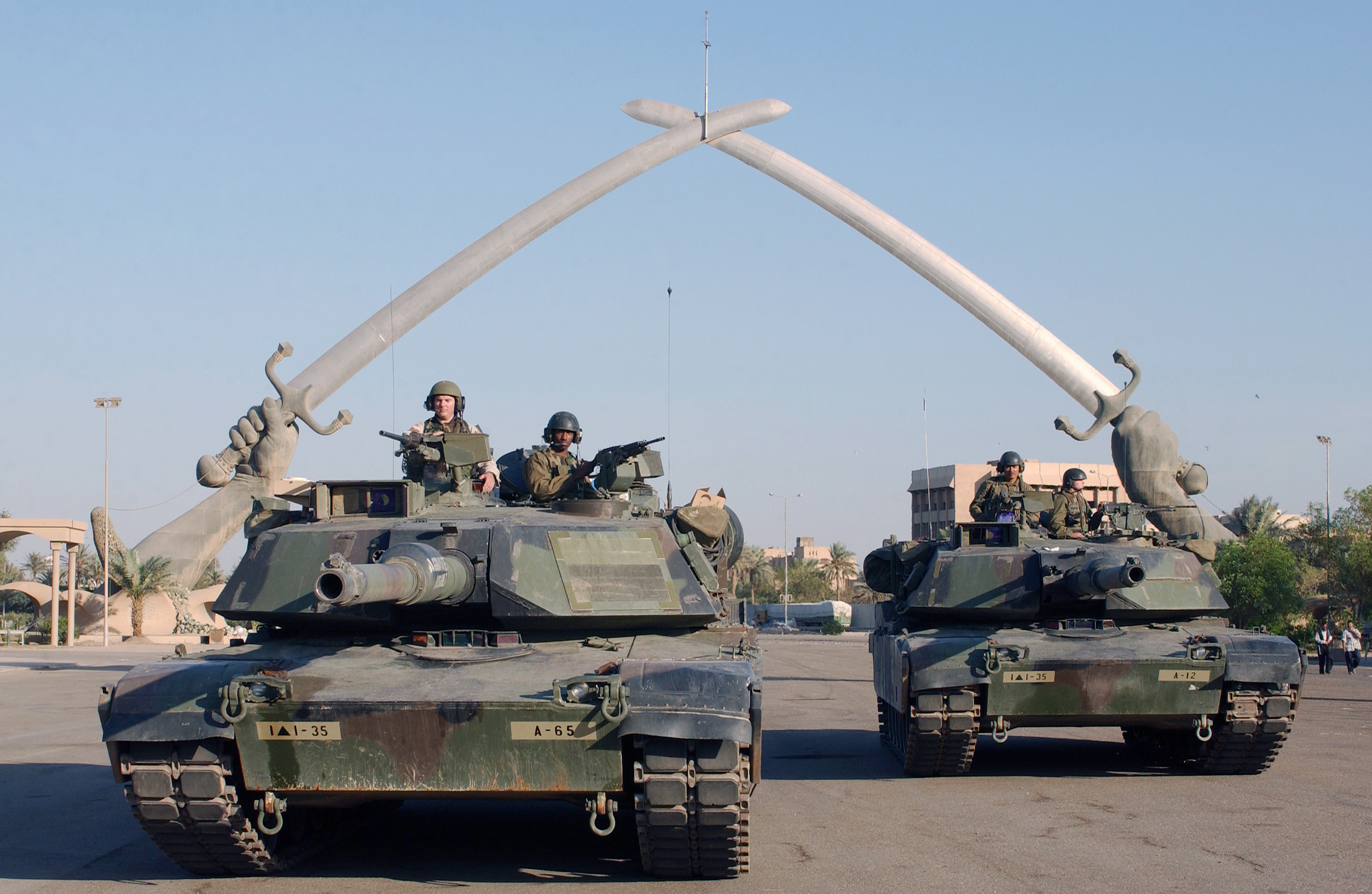
M1A1 Abrams pose for a photo under the "Hands of Victory" in Ceremony Square, Baghdad, Iraq.

Its first major product was A View of Operation Iraqi Freedom from Saddam's Senior Leadership, a comprehensive study of the inner workings of the government of Saddam Hussein based on certain documents seized in Iraq in 2003 known as the Operation Iraqi Freedom Documents and on interviews with various Iraqi personnel.

Its second product, entitled Saddam and Terrorism, was completed November 2007 and scheduled for release in March, 2008. In 2008, news outlets reported that contrary to usual practice, this report would not be released on the internet or by email, but only as a CD that would have to be requested. Later, however, a redacted version of the report was made available online through the Defense Technical Information Center.

== A View of Operation Iraqi Freedom ==
A View of Operation Iraqi Freedom from Saddam's Senior Leadership is a comprehensive study of the inner workings of the government of Saddam Hussein based on certain documents seized in Iraq in 2003 known as the Operation Iraqi Freedom Documents and on interviews with various Iraqi personnel.

=== An incomplete analysis ===
In the foreword to the book, General Anthony Cucolo writes:

Though this project is an important initial step, we acknowledge the history of OIF is far from complete. Researchers continue to locate, translate, and analyze information that will shed new light on our former adversary's perspective of the conflict. It is in the interest of getting as much accurate information as possible into the hands of those already studying Operation Iraqi Freedom that we release this book.

=== Saddam's Delusions ===
A shorter analysis of these documents by the study's principal authors (Pentagon analysts Kevin Woods, James Lacey, and Williamson Murray) entitled "Saddam's Delusions" argues that the documents above confirm that Saddam's overall strategic calculus was based on misinformation and faulty judgment about the country's confrontation with the United States. For example, the authors wrote: "As far as can be determined from the interviews and records reviewed so far, there was no national plan to embark on a guerrilla war in the event of a military defeat. Nor did the regime appear to cobble together such a plan as its world crumbled around it. Buoyed by his earlier conviction that the Americans would never dare enter Baghdad, Saddam hoped to the very last minute that he could stay in power. And his military and civilian bureaucrats went through their daily routines until the very end."

=== Conclusions ===
The report contains the following conclusions:

- Saddam seriously miscalculated probable coalition military strategy. In large part, he was unwilling to believe that US troops would expose themselves to possible casualties, or that the coalition would engage in a ground campaign without a lengthy prior air campaign. (Study, pages viii-ix, 15-16).
- Saddam kept grip on Iraq through a merciless police state and was always on the watch for conspiracies. He was particularly concerned about Jewish conspiracies, ranging from his theories that Jews manipulated United Nations Secretary General Boutros Boutros-Ghali to cause Iraq problems with the UN during the 1990s to his theories that Jews were responsible for the Mongols' decision to sack Baghdad. His paranoia about Zionist conspiracies was spread to his security services. In a memorandum provided by the General Security Directorate in 2001 it was reported that "the cartoon character Pokémon", widely beloved by Iraqi youth, was part of a plot by international Zionism to undermine Iraq's security. (Study, page 5)
- Iraqi military forces had been conditioned to fight and anticipate wars similar to that fought against Iran - slow tempo, bloody, lengthy campaigns. Iraqi military planners, and Saddam in particular, did not appear to understand or anticipate the speed and technological sophistication of the coalition forces. (Study, pages 45–46).
- Prior to the war, Iraq's long-term goal was to use its oil revenues to influence the UN (particularly France and Russia) and lift sanctions. (Study, page 90). However, Saddam also believed that for diplomatic purposes, he had to convince numerous competitors that Iraq possessed weapons of mass destruction, particularly since the belief in his WMD increased his status in the Arab world. (Study, pages 91–93). For example, Chemical Ali reported that while he personally believed that Iraq did not have WMD, "Saddam was asked about the weapons during a meeting with members of the Revolutionary Command Council. He replied that Iraq did not have WMD but flatly rejected a suggestion that the regime remove all doubts to the contrary, going on to explain that such a declaration might encourage the Israelis to attack." (Study page 92). Saddam's deceptions on the issue of WMD were sufficiently successful that even months after the 2003 war, senior Iraqi officials continued to believe it possible "that Iraq still possessed a WMD capacity hidden away somewhere." Ironically, these officials' belief were based on a combination of Saddam's deceptions, the secrecy and compartmentalization of the Iraqi government, and on the Iraqi officials' faith in reports of CIA assessments of the Iraqi government's WMD programs. (Study, page 92).
- The study also cites documents demonstrating that key evidence presented by Colin Powell to the United Nations in February 2003 had been misinterpreted by the U.S. government. According to the study, Saddam decided in 2002 to attempt to persuade the UN that Iraq was free of WMD. However, Western intelligence services interpreted Iraqi instructions to ensure compliance with UN regulations as attempts to conceal WMD. One example is a message between two Iraqi Republican Guard Corps commanders discussing the removal of the words "nerve agents" from "the wireless instructions," or to "search the area surrounding the headquarters camp and [the unit] for any chemical agents, make sure the area is free of chemical containers, and write a report on it". According to the study, "What was meant to prevent suspicion thus ended up heightening it." (Study, pages 93–94).
- There is additional evidence of failure to cooperate on the part of the Iraqis. For example, a December 15, 2002 memo from an undercover Iraqi Intelligence escort for a UN inspection team wrote: "Inside Bader WMD inspection site, there are Russian and Turkish scientists. When we visited the site, they were forced to hide from inspectors' eyes." The study authors concluded that "even when viewed through a post-war lens, documentary evidence of messages are consistent with the Iraqi Survey Group's conclusion that Saddam was at least keeping a WMD program primed for a quick re-start the moment the UN Security Council lifted sanctions. (Study, page 95).

== Saddam and Terrorism ==
The Saddam and Terrorism report was completed November 2007 and scheduled for release in March, 2008. Although this report was originally planned to be released as a PDF available on the JSF website and by email, it was announced that it would be available only as a CD that would have to be requested. However, the report is available through the Defense Technical Information Center website.

The CD has five documents; volume 1 is the report itself; the other four are appendices, mostly of the original documents translated into English. Each is marked as redacted. Various web sites have posted the documents, such as National Public Radio.
