= Vincent Cannistraro =

American intelligence director

Vincent Cannistraro was an American intelligence officer.

== Personal ==
Cannistaro received a B.A. and M.A. from Boston College.

== Early CIA career ==
Before 1984, Cannistaro was an officer in the CIA Directorate of Operations across the Middle East, Africa, Europe, and Central America.

Cannistraro ran CIA's Central American Task Force (CATF), which oversaw covert action in the region, including U.S. support for the Nicaraguan Contras. At the direction of CIA Latin American Division Chief Duane Clarridge, who supported Col. Oliver North, Cannistraro moved to the Reagan administration's National Security Council (NSC) in 1984, when the Contra program was moved to the NSC.

== National Security Council ==
From 1984 to 1987, Cannistraro was Director of Intelligence Programs at the NSC, then a Special Assistant for Intelligence in the Office of the Secretary of Defense until 1988. As director, he was responsible for monitoring the US intelligence community budget. and coordinating the approval process for covert action. He also chaired the Afghanistan Working Group at the White House.

=== Iran-Contra affair ===
Cannistraro was a witness for the defense during former White House aide Oliver North's trial over his role in the Iran–Contra affair. On April 4, 1989, Cannistraro testified that he felt North could not be trusted to tell the truth and had gained the reputation of a prevaricator at the NSC. On May 4, 1989, a jury found North guilty on three felony counts, including altering and destroying NSC documents, aiding and abetting the obstruction of a Congressional inquiry into the affair, and of illegally accepting a gift.

== Later CIA career ==
From October 1988 until his retirement in September 1990, Cannistraro was Chief of Operations and Analysis at CIA's Counterterrorist Center, where he oversaw U.S. intelligence collection and analysis on terrorist groups and ran covert actions. He did not have a role in determining counterterrorism policy in his roles either at CIA, the White House, or at the Department of Defense, where he monitored and coordinated intelligence operations. In this role, he led CIA's investigation into the 1988 bombing of Pan Am Flight 103.

== Post-government ==
=== Commentary and consulting in the 1990s ===
After leaving the CIA, Cannistraro worked as a consultant on terrorism and security issues for corporate and government clients, including ABC News and The Vatican. Shortly after his retirement, Cannistraro claimed in November 1990 that the U.S. government applied a double standard to state sponsors of terrorism in the Middle East, overlooking acts by Syria under Hafez al-Assad while criticizing Iran and Iraq. According to the New York Times, Cannistraro was the first former counterterrorism official to publicly raise the issue of Washington's counterterrorism policy.

According to journalist Ronald Kessler, CIA officials believed that an August 17, 1998, story in the Washington Times citing a claim from Cannistraro that the United States was intercepting the phone calls of Osama bin Laden's associates triggered bin Laden's decision to stop using his satellite phone. Within a few days of the publication of Cannistraro's claim, bin Laden and his associates stopped using their phones. The CIA told Kessler that they believed bin Laden would have continued to use his phone if the intercepts had not been compromised.

=== After 9/11 ===
The day after the September 11 attacks, Cannistraro falsely claimed that five of the 9/11 hijackers had entered the United States through Canada, either via Yarmouth, Nova Scotia, or a remote border crossing near Jackman, Maine. The claim was wrong, but Cannistraro never publicly acknowledged the error, helping give rise to the enduring “9/11 myth” that several of the hijackers entered the United States from Canada.

Cannistraro observed in 2002 that the U.S. had successfully met its objectives upon the Soviet withdrawal from Afghanistan in 1989, but had subsequently failed to assist in the country's stabilization. Cannistraro's view was supported by Pakistani General Hamid Gul, former head of the Pakistani ISI, who described the U.S. departure as a "crime".

Cannistraro also alleged that Iraqi intelligence agent Farouk Hijazi had invited bin Laden to live in Iraq during a December 1998 meeting in Afghanistan, though he maintained that bin Laden refused the invitation and did not accept support from Saddam Hussein.

According to Cannistraro, CIA Director George Tenet had arranged for the Department of Defense to be informed about Ahmed Chalabi's unrealiability and ties to Iranian intelligence in 2002, but the CIA had been blown off by the Pentagon.

He reported on the forged Niger "yellowcake" uranium documents as an attempt by some Bush administration supporters to link Iraq with nuclear weapons development in order to increase public support for the Iraq war), and on the related disclosure of the identity of CIA case officer Valerie Plame.

== Personal life ==
He died on May 21, 2019. He received the Secretary of Defense Meritorious Civilian Service Award and the Distinguished Intelligence Medal.
