= Farouk Hijazi =

Farouk Hijazi (Arabic: فاروق حجازي) is a former Iraqi government official who served the Iraqi government during the rulership of Saddam Hussein. Hijazi served as Hussein's Director of External Operations for the Mukhabarat, the Iraqi intelligence service for many years before becoming Iraq's ambassador to Turkey.

The United States government claimed that while he was ambassador to Turkey, Hijazi made several trips in which he came into contact with members of al-Qaeda. Hijazi's alleged connections with high-ranking members of al-Qaeda served as one piece of information offered as evidence of an al-Qaeda link to Saddam Hussein used to justify the Second Persian Gulf War.

During the war, Hijazi attempted to seek asylum in Syria. In April 2003, Hijazi was arrested in Syria and escorted across the Iraq border where he was detained by Coalition Forces. According to Seymour Hersh, a journalist and contributor to The New Yorker, Hijazi has cooperated with Coalition Forces after his capture in order to revive the old Iraqi intelligence network in order to establish security in post-war Iraq.

In February 1999, former CIA counter-terrorism official Vincent Cannistraro claimed that Farouk Hijazi had invited Osama bin Laden to live in Baghdad to be nearer to potential targets of terrorist attack in Saudi Arabia and Kuwait. Later, in 2003, Cannistraro claimed that bin Laden had rejected Hijazi's overtures, concluding that he did not want to be "exploited" by Iraq's secular regime. The Boston Globe reported, "Indeed, intelligence agencies tracked contacts between Iraqi agents and Al Qaeda agents in the '90s in Sudan and Afghanistan, where bin Laden is believed to have met with Farouk Hijazi, head of Iraqi intelligence. But current and former intelligence specialists caution that such meetings occur just as often between enemies as friends. Spies frequently make contact with rogue groups to size up their intentions, gauge their strength, or try to infiltrate their ranks, they said." (3 August 2003). According to The Guardian, "Most analysts believe, however, that the ideological differences between the Iraqis and the terrorists were insurmountable. The talks are thought to have ended disastrously for the Iraqis, as bin Laden rejected any kind of alliance, preferring to pursue his own policy of global jihad, or holy war."
