= Liberal and progressive Islam in North America =

This is a list of individual liberal and progressive Islamic movements in North America, sorted by country.

== Canada ==
=== Muslim Canadian Congress ===
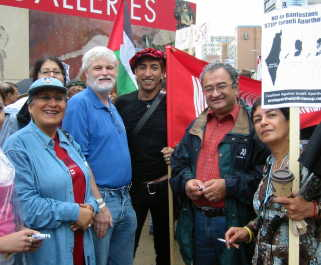
Tarek Fatah and other MCC board members at anti-war and anti-Zionist demonstration in Toronto related with the 2006 Israel-Lebanon conflict.

Formed in December 2001, the Muslim Canadian Congress was organized to provide a voice to Muslims who support a "progressive, liberal, pluralistic, democratic, and secular society where everyone has the freedom of religion." Tarek Fatah was one of the founders of the Muslim Canadian Congress in 2001, after the September 11 attacks and served as its communications director and spokesperson until 2006. The group gained prominence by opposing the implementation of Shariah in civil law in Ontario and supporting the country's same-sex marriage legislation. The group also promotes gender equality and was involved in organizing a Muslim prayer session in which the prayers were led by a woman, Raheel Raza. It has also been critical of Islamic fundamentalism and has urged the government to ban donations to Canadian religious institutions from abroad arguing that doing so will curb extremism.

== United States ==
=== American Islamic Congress ===
The American Islamic Congress (AIC) is a 501(c)(3) non-profit organization based in the United States. AIC was founded in November 2001 by a group of American Muslims to promote tolerance following the September 11, 2001 attacks. AIC is a non-religious, civil rights organization whose stated goal is to build interfaith and inter-ethnic understanding. It receives significant funding from the U.S. government. Zainab Al-Suwaij co-founded the organization to "represent those American Muslims who cherished the freedoms of the U.S. after living under repressive regimes." Suwaij was a prominent public supporter of the 2003 U.S. war with Iraq.

=== American Islamic Forum for Democracy ===
American Islamic Forum for Democracy (AIFD) is an American Muslim think tank formed in 2003 by a small group of Muslim professionals in Phoenix, Arizona. The group's founder is Zuhdi Jasser who is also the group's president and chief spokesman. AIFD advocates for the separation of religion and state and confronts the ideologies of political Islam and openly counters the belief that the Muslim faith is inextricably rooted to the concept of the Islamic state. Jasser and a group of American Muslims founded the group with the goal of demonstrating the compatibility of Islam with democracy and American values. The AIFD supports separation of religion and state, religious pluralism, equality of the sexes, the unconditional recognition of Israel, and the creation of an independent Palestine "on the current 'occupied territories.'" The organization rejects terrorism and any justification for it. Zuhdi Jasser has been the center of various controversies and has been criticized by several Muslims and non Muslims alike.

=== Center for Islamic Pluralism ===
The Center for Islamic Pluralism (CIP) is a United States–based Islamic think tank challenging Islamist interpretations of Islam. It was founded in 2004 by eight people including the Sufi Muslim author Stephen Suleyman Schwartz and officially opened on March 25, 2005. With its headquarters in Washington, D.C., today it has subsidiaries in London and Cologne, Germany and correspondents in 32 countries of the world.

=== Muslims for Progressive Values ===
Muslims for Progressive Values (MPV) was founded and incorporated by Ani Zonneveld in August 2007, headquartered in Los Angeles and with a regional office in Malaysia. In December 2013, United Nations recognized Muslims for Progressive Values as an official non-government organization (NGO) association member. The NGO/DPI Executive Committee represents 1,500 NGO organizations with monthly meetings. MPV's consultative status enables its advocacy to go global by challenging human rights abuses in the name of Sharia law of Muslim-majority countries at the United Nations and at the Human Rights Council on issues of women's rights, LGBT rights, Freedom of Expression and Freedom of and from Religion and Belief. MPV has a board of advisors including scholars and activists such as: Reza Aslan, Amir Hussein, Karima Bennoune, Daayiee Abdullah, Zainah Anwar, Saleemah Abdul-Ghafur, and El-Farouk Khaki.

=== Muslim Reform Movement ===
The Muslim Reform Movement is an organization dedicated to reform in Islam based on values of peace, human rights and secular governance. The organization was founded on December 4, 2015, when the founders read a "Declaration of Reform" at the National Press Club in Washington, D.C. The founders then went to the Saudi-affiliated Islamic Center of Washington and posted the Declaration of Reform on the doors of mosque "denouncing violent jihad, rejecting Islamic statism and opposing the 'ideology of violent Islamic extremism.'"

Founding signatories of the Muslim Reform Movement are Asra Nomani, Tahir Aslam Gora, Tawfik Hamid, Usama Hasan, Arif Humayun, Farahnaz Ispahani, Zuhdi Jasser, Naser Khader, Courtney Lonergan, Hasan Mahmud, Raheel Raza, Sohail Raza, and Salma Siddiqui.

=== Secular Islam Summit ===
The Secular Islam Summit was an international forum for secularists of Islamic societies, held 4–5 March 2007 in St. Petersburg, Florida. It was largely organized and funded by the Center for Inquiry, a secular humanist educational organization, along with secular Muslims such as Banafsheh Zand-Bonazzi and in partnership with the International Intelligence Summit, a forum on terrorism.

The common ground of the participants was the belief that Islam and secular democracy should be compatible. They agreed that Islam must be either a religion or a political philosophy, not both. According to Banafsheh Zand-Bonazzi, one of the organizers, one of the summit's goals was to be a "sanctuary" for victims of Islamism and a forum for the embrace of secular values.

Speakers ranged from former believers to devout reformers, including Ibn Warraq (the pen name of an ex-Muslim author known for criticism of Islam), Tawfik Hamid (an ex-jihadist, now in hiding), Afshin Ellian (an Iranian refugee under police protection), Irshad Manji (a self-described "radical traditionalist"), Ayaan Hirsi Ali (a former member of the Dutch Parliament), and Hasan Mahmud (director of Shariah at the Muslim Canadian Congress).

Several devout Muslims that had been invited to speak, such as Faisal Abdul Rauf and Mike Ghouse, did not attend; one that did, Irshad Manji, criticized the summit for "not making stronger overtures to practicing Muslims", and urged them to seek common ground.

== See also ==
- Liberal and progressive Islam in Europe
