= Austin Dacey =

American philosopher (born 1972)

Austin Warren Dacey
- Born: April 19, 1972 (age 54)

Philosophical work
- Era: Contemporary philosophy
- Region: Western philosophy
- School: Analytic philosophy
- Main interests: Ethics; political philosophy; philosophy of religion

Austin Dacey (born April 19, 1972) is an American philosopher, writer, and human rights activist whose work concerns secularism, religion, freedom of expression, and freedom of conscience. He is the author of The Secular Conscience: Why Belief Belongs in Public Life; The Future of Blasphemy: Speaking of the Sacred in an Age of Human Rights; and a 2006 New York Times op-ed entitled "Believing in Doubt," which criticized the ethical views of Pope Benedict. He is a representative to the United Nations for the International Humanist and Ethical Union and the creator and director of The Impossible Music Sessions.

== Life and career ==
Dacey was raised in the rural Midwest by liberal Catholics. His father Philip Dacey is a poet. As a young teenager, Dacey became an evangelical Protestant, playing in the Christian alternative rock band, The Swoon, which in 1990 released an EP produced by Charlie Peacock. While studying music and philosophy at The Evergreen State College in Olympia, Washington, Dacey lost his religion, explaining later that "God stopped returning my calls." He studied applied ethics and social philosophy at Bowling Green State University in Bowling Green, Ohio, and was awarded a doctorate in 2002. In 2005, he debated Christian philosopher William Lane Craig over the existence of God.

Beginning in 1999, Dacey worked for the Center for Inquiry (CFI), a think tank that seeks "to foster a secular society based on science, reason, freedom of inquiry, and humanist values." He opened the New York City branch office of CFI and later served as the organization's representative to the United Nations. In 2009, Dacey left CFI and published a critique of the secular movement. In 2010, he created The Impossible Music Sessions, a forum in New York City for censored and persecuted musicians. He has taught ethics at the Polytechnic Institute of New York University.

In 2022, he began working as a prison education coordinator for Greene Correctional Facility in New York.

== Secularism ==
Dacey has defended a form of secularism emphasizing the values of "individual autonomy, equal rights and freedom of conscience." Religion News Service dubbed him a member of Atheism 3.0, a designation he contests. He claims that secularism is not atheistic, but instead that it comes "before God." Aspects of Dacey's position have been embraced by religious thinkers such as Richard John Neuhaus, Andrew Sullivan, and Rabbi Marc Gellman as well as secular figures such as Sam Harris, Susan Jacoby, Ibn Warraq, and Peter Singer.

=== Theory of conscience ===
In The Secular Conscience, Dacey argues that contemporary secular liberalism has "lost its soul" due to misconceptions he labels the Privacy Fallacy and the Liberty Fallacy. The Privacy Fallacy lies in thinking that "because matters of conscience are private in the sense of nongovernmental, they are private in the sense of personal preference." The Liberty Fallacy lies in thinking that "because conscience must be free from coercion, its moral conclusions must also be free from public criticism." This confused thinking, according to Dacey, leads to "the conclusion that controversial religious and moral claims are beyond evaluation by reason, truth and objective standards of right and wrong, and should therefore be precluded from public conversation."

In place of the "privacy of conscience," Dacey defends a model of the "openness of conscience," comparing conscience to a free press. It is to be protected from coercion so that it can be free to play an important role in the public sphere and free to follow its own objective standards. Reasons of conscience are by their nature shareable, not subjective. Dacey uses the biblical story of Abraham and Isaac to illustrate the thesis that "any act of faith depends on a prior act of conscience."

=== Politics of conscience ===
By precluding conscience from public debate, secular liberals had hoped to prevent believers from introducing sectarian beliefs into politics. Instead, the "gag order" has prevented secular liberals from subjecting religious claims to "due public scrutiny" and from advancing their own views in robustly moral terms, granting a "monopoly on the language of ethics and values" to the religious on the Right and the Left. Dacey argues that claims of conscience—including religious claims—cannot be barred from public debate, but that they can and must be held to the same critical conversational standards as all serious contributions to public debate.

While advocating the separation of religion and state, Dacey has suggested that political institutions should be designed to protect the exercise of conscience, not religion as such. In "Against Religious Freedom", a 2010 article in Dissent co-authored with Colin Koproske, he argues that religious freedom should be regarded as "one manifestation of more fundamental rights held by all people, religious and secular alike: private property, personal autonomy, freedom of expression, freedom of association, and perhaps most important, freedom of conscience."

=== Secularism and Islam ===
Criticizing the failure of some on the Left in the West to support secular liberal forces in the Arab and Muslim world, Dacey has stressed the importance of religious rationales for secularism. He has analogized religious minorities in Muslim-majority countries to dissident Protestant sects such as the Anabaptists who constructed theological arguments for toleration and church-state separation in early modern Europe.

Dacey was a lead organizer of the Secular Islam Summit in March 2007, described by the Wall Street Journal as "a landmark." The conference issued the St. Petersburg Declaration, a statement of principles endorsed by Mithal al-Alusi, Ayaan Hirsi Ali, and Shahriar Kabir among others. Reviewing The Secular Conscience for Asharq Al-Awsat, Amir Taheri wrote, "[m]aking this book available in Arabic, Persian, Turkish and other languages of the Muslim nations would be an immense service."

== Human rights ==
As a representative of civil society organizations at the United Nations, Dacey has participated in lobbying at Human Rights Council in Geneva. to oppose efforts by some member states to diminish international standards of freedom of expression out of "respect for religions and beliefs." "The ultimate aim of this effort is not to protect the feelings of Muslims," Dacey has commented, "but to protect illiberal Islamic states from charges of human rights abuse, and to silence the voices of internal dissidents calling for more secular government and freedom."

In defending a universal human right to blaspheme, Dacey has emphasized that it is a matter of freedom of conscience as much as just freedom of speech. In The Future of Blasphemy, Dacey contends that debates in the international community about religiously offensive expression should be understood as "contests over what counts as sacred" in which unbelievers and heterodox believers reserve a right of conscience to express their views.

In September 2008, Dacey co-authored the CFI report, Islam and Human Rights: Defending Universality at the United Nations, which puts these efforts in the context of a campaign by the intergovernmental Organization of the Islamic Conference to promulgate culturally specific "Islamic human rights."

Dacey also authored a CFI position paper accusing the UN Alliance of Civilizations of neglecting secular perspectives and perpetuating the "problematic division of the social world by religion" for which the "clash of civilizations" thesis is often faulted. There is a "clash of values" but it is taking place "within societies and cultures, not only between them."

== Freedom of music ==
In March 2010, Dacey launched The Impossible Music Sessions, a forum in Brooklyn that features "artists who cannot appear and the music they are not free to make." Featured artists join via Internet streaming or phone as a counterpart with whom they have collaborated in advance performs a live interpretation of their music. Mark LeVine wrote in the Huffington Post that the first Impossible Music Session "will go down in the annals of rock history." The Sessions are produced in cooperation with Freemuse: The World Forum on Music and Censorship.

In an interview, Dacey commented, "Ironically, in the Internet age, the live performance has become even more important. The thing that's frustrating for these groups is that while they can record on their Macbook in their basement and share the music with their friends, the government and other powerful forces in society—they control the public spaces. . . . there's something magical about standing in front of people and playing."

Since 2010, the Sessions have facilitated collaborations between musicians in North America and musicians in Iran, Guinea Bissau, Cameroon, and Cuba. Dacey told the Wall Street Journal that the purpose is to "crosspollinate musically" and "banish isolation."

== Science and culture ==
From his early work with the Center for Inquiry, Dacey has been interested in the cultural implications of science. In 2004 he argued in Skeptical Inquirer that "science is making us more ignorant" by unsettling received cultural understandings of the self, meaning, and morality without replacing them with coherent alternatives. In a column for Skeptical Inquirer, Dacey explores the significance of the "culture of science" in Islamic, Chinese, and Indian cultural contexts.

Dacey coined the term "accommodationism" to describe those "who either recognize no conflicts between religion and science, or who recognize such conflicts but are disinclined to discuss them publicly," a usage which has been adopted in blogosphere debates about creationism and the New Atheism.

A sympathetic critic of organized transhumanism, Dacey is an advocate of culturing meat as an ethical alternative to using animals for meat.

== Controversy ==
In a 2004 article for Free Inquiry magazine, "Atheism is Not a Civil Rights Issue," Dacey and co-author DJ Grothe criticized comparisons between the atheist cause in the United States and the causes of civil rights and LGBT rights, concluding that atheists "need a public awareness campaign, not a liberation movement." The article was attacked by humanists and the atheist blogger PZ Myers.

The Secular Islam Summit was criticized by representatives of the Council on American-Islamic Relations as being organized by non-Muslims and "neo-cons" with no standing in Islam.

The Guardian compared Dacey to the British conservative author Melanie Phillips and associated him with the idea that "our civilization depends on the freedom to publish racist cartoons."

The New York Times questioned whether Dacey has fairly characterized secular liberalism, and commented that many people "will balk at his plea that liberalism place 'global resistance to theocratic Islam at the center of its agenda,' much the way a generation of cold-war liberals once mobilized around anti-Communism.
