= Michael Cherney Foundation =

Israeli charity

- Formation: June 1, 2001; 24 years ago
- Founder: Michael Cherney
- Type: Non-profit organization
- Purpose: Supporting democratic nations in their war on terrorism; assisting émigrés from Russia and post-Soviet nations to integrate into Israeli society
- Services: Financial assistance, educational grants, support for terror victims

The Michael Cherney Foundation is a charitable foundation created by Michael Cherney, a Russian-born Israeli entrepreneur. He defines the foundation's mission as helping democratic nations in their war on terrorism and assisting fellow émigrés to Israel from Russia and other post-Soviet nations realize their intellectual potential and become successfully integrated into the Israeli society.

== History ==
The Foundation was born on 1 June 2001, on the night of the Palestinian Dolphinarium discotheque suicide bombing in Tel Aviv. When Michael Cherney learned the number of victims – twenty-one dead and over 150 wounded – he realized that rendering assistance required a systematic organized effort.

== Mission ==
Besides direct money grants to and paying the bills for survivors and families of the deceased, the Cherney Foundation undertook a media project that included publishing a book called Dolphinarium: Terror Targets the Young, an oral history made of interviews taken by journalists Dmitry Radyshevsky and Polina Lempert with the parents who lost their children and the teenager victims themselves. The book was published in three languages (Hebrew, English, and Russian).

The book was used as a basis for a documentary film, Empty Rooms, also sponsored by MCF. It was directed by Willy Lindwer, an award-winning Dutch director, and produced by David Gurevich. The film played at a number of festivals and received a Silver Award at Worldfest in Houston in 2003.

Subsequently, the Michael Cherney Foundation helped other terror victims, both in Israel and abroad, ranging as far as Dagestan in the Caucasus and the survivors of the infamous Beslan school terror attack. The help Cherney rendered both by cash grants and underwriting treatment – for example, MCF paid for a new wing for Beit Levenshteyn Hospital, a nationally famous rehabilitation facility.

The Foundation has helped a number of Soviet-born émigrés in Israel who, for a variety of reasons, “fall through the cracks” of the system. These range from personal grants, such as the Tabakin family of nine siblings, orphaned and destitute, who resisted the attempts of social services to separate them and put them in different orphanages, to institutional ones – Israeli Veterans Union, an association of WWII Soviet Army veterans; Culture and Art Center for the Russian community in Jerusalem; “Russian and Israeli Writers for Civil Society and Against Terror", a project of the Israeli Writers Federation, and many others.

A great deal of attention has been paid to youth programs, from tickets to Purim Bowl for disabled children to a boarding school for Russian children in Migdal ha-Emek and a first school for recovering Russian-born drug addicts, and many others. During the last Lebanon war the Foundation paid for hundreds of children to be evacuated south away from Hezbollah rockets.

The Foundation also established grants for ex-Soviet youths in all major Israel universities, a program that has already benefited over 120 young people. The Cherney Foundation also sponsors a Jewish school, the Maimonides University, in Moscow. The Foundation pays attention to sports as well, financing youth boxing club in Safed, a soccer club in Hadera, as well as individual athletes for the Olympics.

Besides Terror Targets the Young, the Michael Cherney Foundation has sponsored the publication of several books, generally on Judeo-Christian subjects. Among them are Babylon and Jerusalem (Nauka, Moscow), by Jan Willem van der Hoven, the founder of International Christian Embassy Jerusalem, which also includes a collection of essays by Russian Orthodox church intellectuals. The Foundation also sponsors a series called No To Extremism: Anti-Fascist Library, which includes a biography of Menachem Begin and From Hell to Paradise and Back: The Jewish Question: Lenin, Stalin and Solzhenitsyn by Arkady Vaksberg, a prominent writer and historian who was a co-author of Stalin's Prosecutor: The Life of Andrei Vyshinsky.
