= Mike Mohamed Ghouse =

Indian-American social scientist and writer

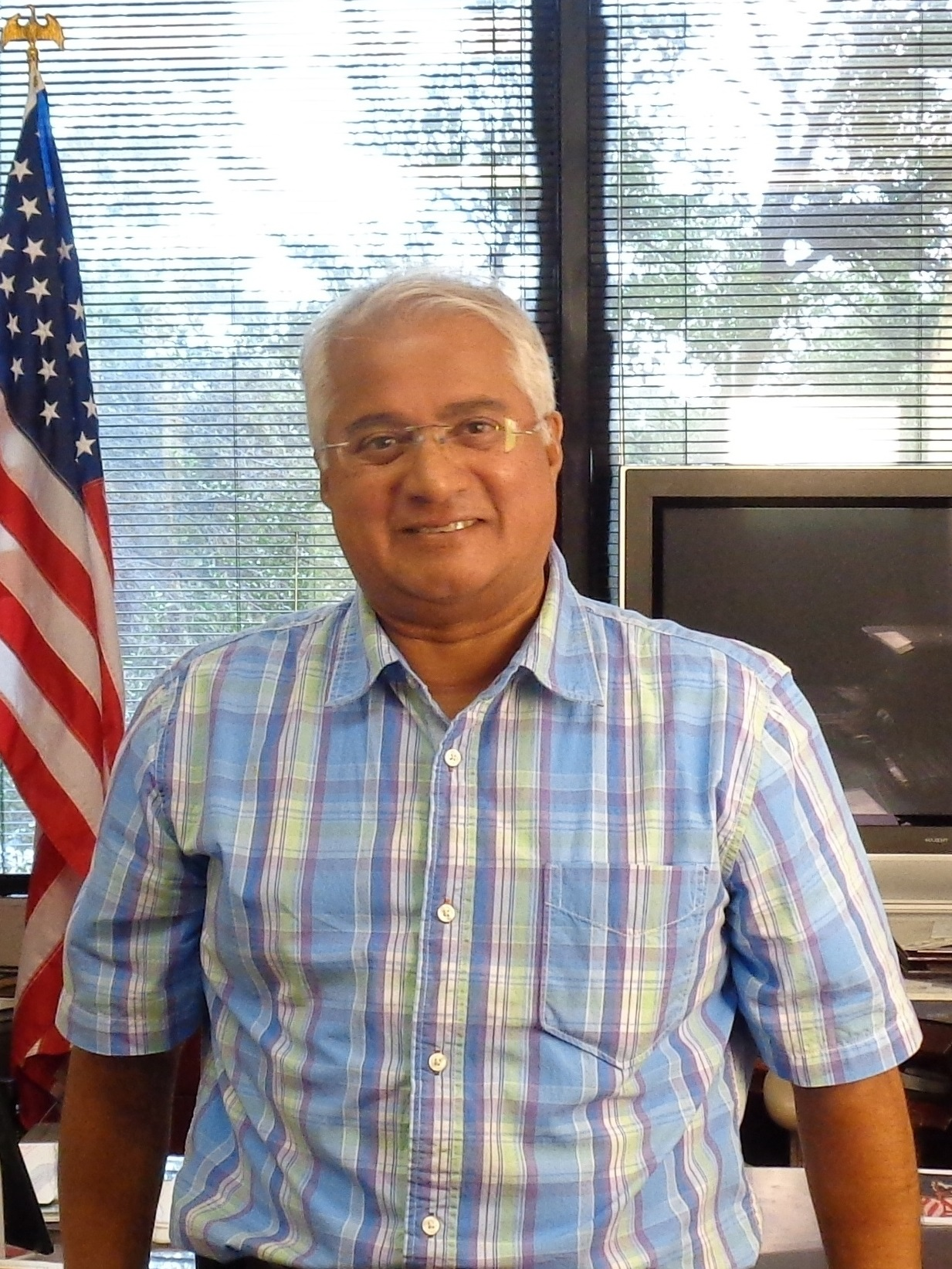
- Born: Yelahanka, Bengaluru, India
- Citizenship: American, Indian
- Occupation: Social scientist
- Known for: Interfaith dialogue, religious pluralism
- Parent(s): Khairun Nisa and M. Abdul Rahman

Academic background
- Education: Bangalore University; University of Dallas

Academic work
- Main interests: Religion, peace activism, human rights
- Notable works: American Muslim Agenda: Muslims Together Building a Cohesive America (2019)

Mike Mohamed Ghouse is an Indian-American social scientist and writer. Ghouse's primary interests include religious pluralism in the United States, human rights, and U.S. foreign policy. Currently based in Washington D.C., he is also the director of the Center for Pluralism.

== Early life ==
Mike Ghouse was born in Yelahanka, Bengaluru, India. He was born to Khairun Nisa and M. Abdul Rahman, an Indian freedom fighter and the mayor of the town of Yelahanka, Karnataka during the early 1950s.

After obtaining his master's degree from Bangalore University in 1973, Ghouse immigrated to the United States in 1980.

He then graduated with an MBA from the University of Dallas in 1984, and has also obtained an honorary D.D. (Doctor in Divinity) from Trinity International University in Dallas.

== Career ==
Mike Ghouse is currently the director of the Center for Pluralism (also known as the Foundation for Pluralism), as well as the America Together Foundation. As a peace and human rights activist, he has advocated for the peaceful co-existence of Islam with other world religions and spoken out against both Islamophobia and religious intolerance within the Muslim community.

Ghouse has spoken at various international forums and events, such as the Council of the Parliament of the World's Religions in Melbourne, Australia, and the Middle East Peace Initiative in Jerusalem. He has also served as a commissioner for the municipal government of Carrollton, Texas.

In addition, Mike Ghouse has organized interfaith weddings in the United States, and is an activist for peaceful religious co-existence among Muslims and adherents of different religions.

Ghouse is also a supporter of moderate Islam. He frequently organizes and attends interfaith dialogue events.

== Media ==
Ghouse has appeared as a guest in talk shows hosted by Sean Hannity, Stuart Varney, Laura Ingraham, and many other TV hosts and journalists. He has also written dozens of articles for various newspapers and magazines.

== Selected books ==
- 2019. American Muslim Agenda: Muslims Together Building a Cohesive America ISBN 978-1984575821
- 2012. Islam: Silencing the Critics

== See also ==
- Liberal and progressive Islam in North America
