= Tahir Aslam Gora =

Writer

Tahir Gora
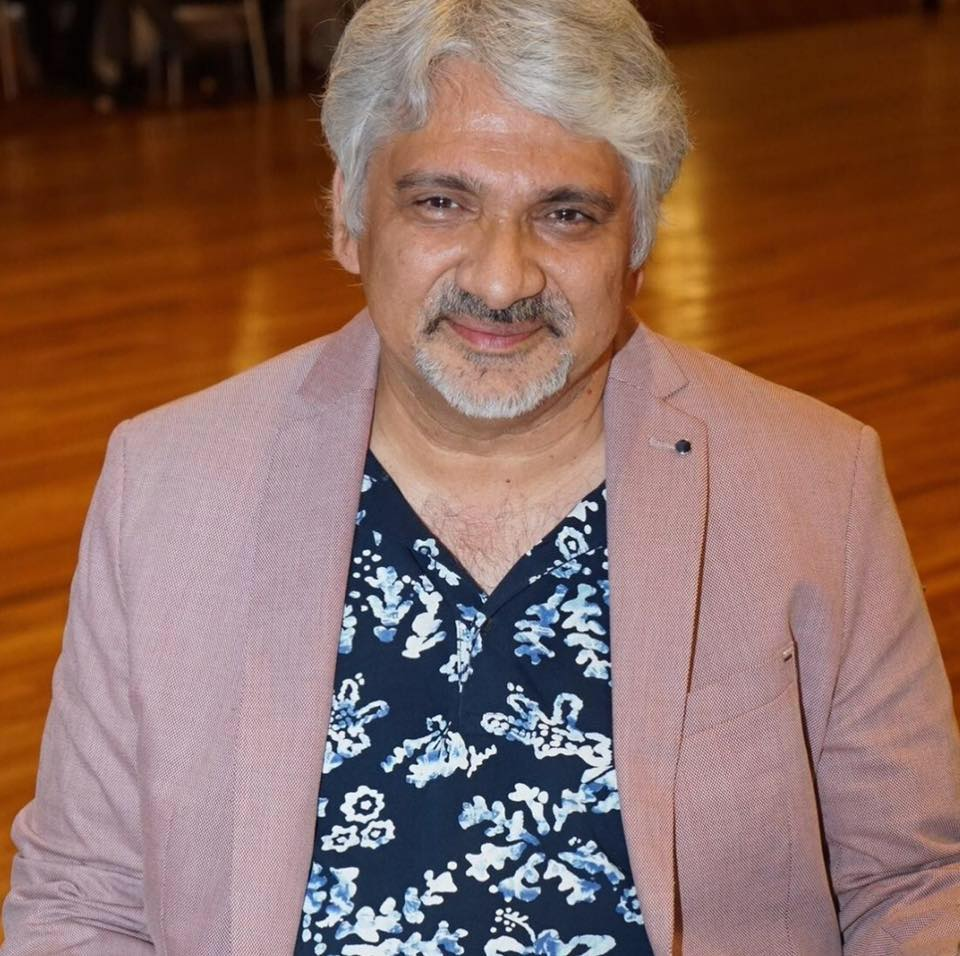
- Tahir Gora at the TAG TV Studio
- Born: Tahir Aslam Gora; September 26, 1963 (age 62)

Tahir Aslam Gora (born September 26, 1963) is a Pakistani Canadian broadcaster, editor, publisher, (English to Urdu) translator, and writer of fiction and non-fiction. He is a campaigner against the dangers of the Political Islam and the Muslim Brotherhood. He co-authored "The Danger of Political Islam to Canada: (With a Warning to America)" exposing how the ideology of political Islam threatens countries and governments around the world, especially Canada and how the current policy of Canadian Prime Minister Justin Trudeau will jeopardize his country as a result of adapting and welcoming all Islamist and religious political currents. He was forced to flee Pakistan in 1999 following threats to his life and found asylum in Canada. As a member of Muslim Reform Movement and Founder & CEO of TAG TV, he holds progressive ideology and supports freedom of expression.

== Early and personal life ==
He was born in September 1963 in Lahore, Pakistan. He is married to Haleema Sadia and the two have launched TAG TV, a United States and Canada based news channel.

== Politics ==
Tahir Gora ran for federal elections in the Mississauga-Malton riding and received 0.7% of the vote.

== Accolades and legacy ==
He is recipient of the Queen Elizabeth II Diamond Jubilee Medal for his services in Canada. He is the founder of Canadian Thinkers Forum, the Progressive Muslims Institute Canada and Muslim Committee Against Antisemitism.

== Books ==
Four novels, three collections of short stories and two collections of poems in Urdu and Hindi have been published, and translated into Russian and Uzbek languages.

== Translations ==
Gora is responsible for the Urdu translation of Irshad Manji’s book “The Trouble with Islam Today”. He is also involved in the translation of the writings of Daniel Pipes and Samia Labidi into the Urdu language.

== Selected bibliography ==
AlBakistan (Novel in Hindi and Urdu) Rang Mahal (Novel in Hindi and Urdu) Covid Ke Dinoun ka Multiculturalism (Novel in Hindi and Urdu) Manzer Ankhoun Mein Thehrey Rehte Hein (Poems in Hindi and Urdu)

- Submission: The Danger of Political Islam to Canada, with a Warning to America (Co-author).
- Safar Akher Safar Hey (short stories in Urdu), Pakistan, Maktaba Tamseel, 1985.
- Mohlat (novel in Urdu). Pakistan, Tarteeb Publishers, 1993
- Yeh Udassi Ki Baat Nahein (poems in Urdu). Pakistan, Tarteeb Publishers, 1993.
- Trevogi Nadegi (novel as a Russian translation). Uzbekistan, Asian Publishers, 1997.
- This is not a Matter of Sorrow (English translation of poetry). Pakistan, Tarteeb Publishers, 1997.

== See also ==
- Tarek Fatah
