= Ahmed Bedier =

Ahmed Bedier may refer to:

- Ahmed Bedier (activist)
- Ahmed Bedier (actor)
