= Christopher Largen =

American novelist (1969–2012)

- Born: Christopher Jon Largen; June 18, 1969; Fort Worth, Texas, U.S
- Died: December 22, 2012 (aged 43); Austin, Texas, U.S
- Occupations: Author; public speaker; filmmaker
- Writing career
- Period: 1969–2012
- Genres: Nonfiction; satire; exposé; documentary
- Website: waronjunk.com

Christopher Jon Largen (June 18, 1969 – December 22, 2012) was an American journalist, author, filmmaker, and social satirist. He was known for his work on health, public policy, and his activism against child abuse, and his contributions to independent media and documentary films.

== Early life ==
Largen was born at Harris Methodist Hospital in Fort Worth, Texas to Robert and Karen Largen.

== Career ==
=== Theater ===
At the age of eight, Largen was a performer in various positions, including stage singer, actor, dancer, and model. Singing with the Kim Dawson Agency, he performed in both professional and community theaters in Chicago, Fort Worth, and St. Louis. He played both leading and supporting roles. Largen worked alongside actors such as Ruta Lee, Debbie Reynolds, and Jerry Russell. He also fulfilled contracts in runway and catalogue modeling, as well as a television commercial for the amusement park Old Chicago. He studied theater at the Creative Arts Theater School in Chicago and pursued ballet at Barbara Wood Dance Studio in Fort Worth.

Largen attended the Professional Youth Conservatory (PYC) in Fort Worth, a now-defunct private performing arts high school located in the attic of the Methodist church on the campus of Texas Wesleyan University. While at PYC, he studied drama, dance, voice, mime, and playwriting. He took classes with other professional performers, including Grammy award-winning gospel singer Kirk Franklin. Through self-paced study, he received his four-year diploma in two years and was honored with the Outstanding Student of the Year award in 1987. He was subsequently awarded a full drama scholarship at Texas Wesleyan University, which he declined in order to pursue interdisciplinary humanities studies at the University of North Texas in Denton.

=== Journalism ===
Largen's literary debut was a 2001 front-cover feature article for Village Voice. The article was an investigative report on the U.S. government's little-known medical cannabis program. Subsequently, Largen was featured in hundreds of print and online news and literary outlets in the United States, Canada, the United Kingdom, the Netherlands, and Germany.

=== Caregiving ===
He also worked in geriatrics and hospice care and served as a counselor for emotionally disturbed children who were survivors of physical and sexual abuse.

In 2010, Largen received his interdisciplinary Bachelor of Applied Arts and Sciences degree in Psychology, Sociology, and Rehabilitation from the University of North Texas.

=== Prescription Pot ===
In 2003, Largen co-authored the nonfiction book Prescription Pot with George McMahon. McMahon was a former vice-presidential candidate, recipient of the National Certificate of Heroism, and legal user of medical cannabis from the Compassionate Investigational New Drug program. McMahon used medical cannabis to treat pain, spasms, and nausea related to repeated injuries, surgical and pharmaceutical maltreatment, and nail-patella syndrome.

During the authoring of Prescription Pot, Largen traveled the United States with McMahon, documenting their efforts to educate doctors and legislators about the therapeutic value of the cannabis plant. The book details one of their journeys through Texas, from the Arkansas state capitol building in Little Rock to Elvis Presley's Graceland, culminating in their arrival at the University of Mississippi, where the U.S. government grows marijuana for the federal cannabis program. The travels inspired several articles in popular news outlets, and the book received positive reviews in international print and online venues.

Largen appeared on stage with a wide array of artists, musicians, politicians, professional athletes, and scientists, including talk show host Montel Williams, funk musician George Clinton, former NFL lineman and two-time Super Bowl champion Mark Stepnoski, former Tribal President of the Oglala Sioux Alex White Plume, Kentucky Governor candidate Gatewood Galbraith, medical researcher Raphael Mechoulam, and Spoonfed Tribe.

=== Junk ===
In 2005, Largen authored the dystopian satirical novel Junk, published by ENC Press, about a fictional war on junk food declared in response to obesity-related illnesses and death. Junk satirized a spectrum of issues, including religion, government, political correctness, organized crime, and the media. Largen edited Junk with popular publisher and author Olga Gardner Galvin. Junk received the Blog Critics award for Top Ten Books of the Year and garnered positive reviews in alternative and college newspapers throughout the country, with some critics comparing Largen's novel to Mark Twain and Kurt Vonnegut. In 2008, Largen adapted Junk into a screenplay.

=== Building-BLOCK ===
An outspoken survivor of violence in his childhood, Largen is a founder of Building-BLOCK (Better Lives for Our Communities and Kids), a national nonprofit organization dedicated to reducing and preventing child abuse, improving public safety, and exposing legal injustices and sentencing disparities.

During his efforts to establish Building-BLOCK, Largen interviewed Mark Lunsford, the father of abducted and murdered Jessica Lunsford and an outspoken advocate for Jessica's Law. Largen publicly advocates for longer prison sentences for child predators, closer monitoring of paroled pedophiles and violent felons, and greater prioritization of victim rights.

The Washington Post featured Building-BLOCK in a syndicated column written by Neal Peirce, and it appeared in multiple U.S. newspapers, including the Lone Star Iconoclast.

=== Bohemia Rising: The Story of Fry Street ===
In 2007, Largen produced and directed The Burning of Fry Street, a documentary about an arts community protest that evolved into arson and economic sabotage.

In May 2006, the 100-block of Fry Street in Largen's hometown of Denton, Texas, was purchased by United Equities, a Houston-based real estate company, which announced that several of the historic buildings would be demolished to accommodate a corporate strip center. A grassroots effort by the nonprofit organization Save Fry Street was unsuccessful in preventing the development.

In June 2007, Largen arrived at Fry Street, hoping to obtain demolition process shots, when he discovered activists had seized the gutted building that housed The Tomato Pizza. He decided to stay and keep filming while conducting interviews with dozens of people.

Largen captured the building on video while it burned due to arson on June 27, 2007. Later, Denton arson investigators acquired Largen's camera, and his video footage was used as crime evidence to obtain a warrant for Moseley, who was arrested and accused of setting the fire.

The completed film, The Burning of Fry Street, won the Jury Award for "Best Documentary Short" at Thin Line Film Festival. During the festival, a firebomb was set to blow up the festival headquarters, almost killing several people and destroying the raw footage from the film. Denton Record-Chronicle did not report the incident, for fear of inspiring copycat attacks.

The film received critical acclaim among underground film aficionados and is included in the extensive 2008 DVD compilation, Bohemia Rising: The Story of Fry Street. The compilation chronicles the weeklong demonstrations, arson of The Tomato Pizza, and aftermath, and includes the live music video ("The Denton Polka") which Largen directed for the Grammy award-winning ensemble Brave Combo.

== Bibliography ==
- Prescription Pot: A Leading Advocate's Heroic Battle to Legalize Medical Marijuana (New Horizon Press, 2003)
- Junk (ENC Press, 2005)
- Opposing Viewpoints: Marijuana (2005)

== Filmography ==
- Quincy Jones: Grace (1987)
- The Burning of Fry Street (2007)
- Brave Combo: The Denton Polka Live at Dan's Silverleaf (2007)
- A Driving Peace (2008)
- Bohemia Rising: The Story of Fry Street (2009)
