= ENC Press =

American publishing company

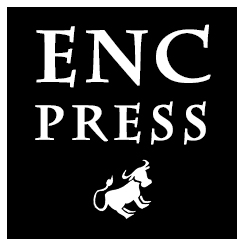
- Industry: Publishing house
- Founded: 2003
- Founder: Olga Gardner Galvin
- Headquarters: Hoboken, New Jersey
- Products: Novels
- Website: https://www.encpress.com/

ENC Press (Emperor's New Clothes Press) is a small, independent American publishing house founded in 2003, in Hoboken, New Jersey, by New York City editor and writer Olga Gardner Galvin. It exclusively publishes full-length novels.

== Business model ==
ENC Press's business model involves distributing its titles through its website and independent bookstores. It forgoes dealing with major chains or online distributors in favor of paying its authors higher royalties. Its stated goal is to keep its titles in print regardless of their performance in the marketplace. The company's motto is "Tipping sacred cows since 2003".

== Publishing history ==
ENC Press launched in July 2003 with four titles: the classic dystopia We, by Yevgheniy Zamyatin, new "XXI-century literary translation" by Linda S. Farne; Vodka for Breakfast, a literary novel by David Gurevich; and The Alphabet Challenge, a futuristic social satire by Olga Gardner Galvin. It was followed in 2003 by Diary of a XX-century Elizabethan Poet, a comedy of mores by Mark Mandell, illustrated by Katrina Hinton-Cooper.

In 2004, ENC Press published two geopolitical novels: Season of Ash by Justin Bryant, set in South Africa, and Exit Only by Liam Bracken, set in Saudi Arabia. It also published a satire Devil Jazz, by Canadian author Craig Forgrave, as well as two British humor novels: Moon Beaver, by Andrew Hook, and Terror from Beyond Middle England, by Sarah Crabtree, both now available only as e-books. Later that year, the literary novel Cherry Whip, by Michael Antman, came out.

In 2005, ENC Press added to its catalogue the futuristic sci-fi novel The Amadeus Net, by Canadian author Mark A. Rayner, and three social satires: Mother's Milk by Andrew Thomas Breslin, ExecTV by David A. Brensilver, and Junk, by Christopher Largen.

In 2007, two more social satires joined its roster: Mean Martin Manning by Scott Stein and $everance by Richard Kaempfer.

Monkey See, a social satire by Walt Maguire, was released in June 2009, followed by Dear Mr. Unabomber, an epistolary satirical novel written and illustrated by Ray Cavanaugh, in September 2009.

The June 2012 release, Escape Clause by Jeffrey R. DeRego, a graphic novel in prose, portrayed a behind-the-scenes world of rules and regulations constraining the powers of superheroes.

Its latest release, Half by Doug Reed, came out on Halloween 2013. It parodies the popular genre of vampire fiction while exploring the downsides of immortality spent in mind-numbingly boring corporate job provided by the federal vampire protection program.

Much of ENC Press's satire stems from libertarian themes of individuals battling oppressive big business or the extremes of political correctness. For example, Olga Gardner Galvin's The Alphabet Challenge is described as a story that involves a bureaucracy "whose members work their fingers to the bone to make caring, compassion, and lowest-common-denominator equality a federal law." Stephen Cox, editor of Liberty magazine writes of Mean Martin Manning: "There are few really good hardcore libertarian novels. This is one of them." Andrew Thomas Breslin's Mother's Milk pokes fun at "radical nutrition advocates"; and in Junk by Christopher Largen, the government has outlawed junk food in order to protect (and control) its citizenry.

ENC Press is a member of the New York Center for Independent Publishing (NYCIP). Its titles have been reviewed in Fox News,Time Out Chicago, Chicago Sun-Times, Liberty magazine, The American Spectator, and Reason magazine, among other print and online venues.

Until further notice, ENC Press does not review unsolicited submissions but offers moral support and consulting services to aspiring self-publishers.
