= Justin Bryant =

America writer and soccer player

Personal information
- Full name: Justin Bryant
- Date of birth: August 24, 1966 (age 60)
- Place of birth: Melbourne, Florida, United States
- Height: 5 ft 11 in (1.80 m)
- Position: Goalkeeper

Senior career*
Years	Team	Apps	(Gls)
1988	Borehamwood FC		
1988	Orlando Lions		
1989	Dunfermline Athletic		
1990–91	Borehamwood FC		
1995	Cocoa Expos	22	

Managerial career
- 1991–1993: Radford University (assistant coach)
- 1994: Queens College (assistant coach)
- 1997–2005: Elon College (assistant coach)
- 2013–15: North Carolina State (Director of Goalkeeping)
- 2017: UNC Wilmington (assistant coach)
- 2018–Current: North Carolina State (Director of Goalkeeping)
- * Club domestic league appearances and goals as of 17:47, 24 February 2007 (UTC) ‡ National team caps and goals as of 7 December 2006

Justin Bryant (born August 24, 1966, in Melbourne, Florida) is an American writer and former soccer goalkeeper.

== Youth and college ==
Bryant grew up in Florida, and attended Radford University in Radford, Virginia. While at Radford, he played on the men's soccer team from 1984 to 1986.

== Soccer ==
Bryant elected to pursue a career as a professional soccer goalkeeper. In 1987, he moved to England and signed with Boreham Wood FC. He made his debut in a 3–0 win against Leatherhead on March 12. While playing for Borehamwood, he had an extended trial at Brentford FC and played as a trialist in several friendlies. He returned to the U.S. that same year to play for the Orlando Lions of the recently established American Soccer League. In 1989, he moved to Scotland to play for Dunfermline Athletic but was unable to obtain a work permit. In 1990, he returned to Boreham Wood FC, where he made 23 appearances for the reserve team. In 1995, he spent a single season with the Cocoa Expos in the U.S., making over 20 first-team appearances. The Expos reached the USISL Premier League final, where they lost 3–1 to the Richmond Kickers.

== Writing ==
In 1996, Bryant decided to give up his playing career, and moved to Elon College and completed his bachelor's degree in English. The college then hired him as the assistant coach for the women's soccer team. Based on an idea for a book he had conceived while visiting his father in South Africa, he wrote a novel, Season of Ash, published in 2004 by ENC Press, and has continued to write, producing short fiction published in such literary journals as Thin Air, Chiron Review, The Rockhurst Review, and Snowbound. His work has also been anthologized by Gorsky Press, Spotted Cow Press, and Key Porter Books. He has written about soccer for XI Quarterly, The Howler Magazine, Green Pitch Magazine, Red Issue, and Bookable Offense. He is a graduate of the MFA Creative Writing program at New York University, where he did his thesis with E. L. Doctorow. He currently writes a column in Goalkeeper Magazine. In June 2013, Bryant published his second book, the autobiographical Small Time: A Life in the Football Wilderness, documenting his travails as a young, professional goalkeeper. He lives in Raleigh, NC with his partner Sarah and their two rescue dogs, Roxy and Bryce.
