= Secular Islam Summit =

The Secular Islam Summit was an international forum for secularists of Islamic societies, held 4–5 March 2007 in St. Petersburg, Florida. It was largely organized and funded by the Amherst, NY-based Center for Inquiry, a secular humanist educational organization, along with secular Muslims such as Banafsheh Zand-Bonazzi and in partnership with the International Intelligence Summit, a forum on terrorism.

== Overview ==
The common ground of the participants was the belief that Islam and secular democracy should be compatible. They agreed that Islam must be either a religion or a political philosophy, not both. According to Banafsheh Zand-Bonazzi, one of the organizers, one of the summit's goals was to be a "sanctuary" for victims of Islamism and a forum for the embrace of secular values.

== Participants ==
Speakers ranged from former believers to devout reformers, including Ibn Warraq (the pen name of an ex-Muslim author known for criticism of Islam), Tawfik Hamid (an ex-jihadist, now in hiding), Afshin Ellian (an Iranian refugee under police protection), Irshad Manji (a self-described "radical traditionalist"), Ayaan Hirsi Ali (a former member of the Dutch Parliament), and Hasan Mahmud (director of Shariah at the Muslim Canadian Congress).

Several devout Muslims that had been invited to speak, such as Faisal Abdul Rauf and Mike Ghouse, did not attend; one that did, Irshad Manji, criticized the summit for "not making stronger overtures to practicing Muslims", and urged them to seek common ground.

== Media attention ==
The summit was covered by Al-Jazeera and broadcast live on the Glenn Beck program on CNN.

== Reception ==
The summit was described by Bret Stephens of the Wall Street Journal as "a landmark." Yvonne Haddad of Georgetown University questioned whether the summit was nonpartisan, saying many summit speakers were known for condemning Islam. Michael Ledeen of the politically conservative American magazine National Review, who attended the summit, described the participants as ex-Muslims and believers, adding, "I think it is no longer possible for people to say there are no reformist (or "moderate") Muslims." Arnold Trebach, a professor emeritus of American University's Department of Justice, Law and Society, also mentioned the summit in the Washington Times as "a tiny spark of hope and reason," saying that all must try to protect the lives of the speakers.

On the same weekend as the summit, the south Florida office of the Council on American–Islamic Relations (CAIR), a Muslim advocacy group, met in Fort Lauderdale. Attendees of the two meetings denounced each other; Ahmed Bedier, who serves as CAIR's Tampa chapter's executive director, dismissed the summit speakers as "atheists and non-Muslims" hostile to Islam. In contrast, speakers of the summit characterizing CAIR as Saudi-funded Islamists "hypersensitive to any criticism of Muslims" and "too quick to declare who is, or who is not, a true Muslim." CAIR elaborated on their criticism of the summit, referring to Haddad's comments on the speakers' extremism and stating that the summit was wrong in promoting the idea that only former Muslims who disdained Islam, rather than Muslims who desired reform, could bring effective change. They attributed to growing Islamophobia the idea of "reforming" Islam by converting Muslims. Investor's Business Daily, in an op-ed titled "What is CAIR Afraid Of?", described CAIR as a bullying Islamist group and stated that "... the Secular Islam Summit offers a ray of hope," envisioning a larger number of moderate Muslims further discomfiting the civil rights group.

== Summit activities ==
Ibn Warraq and Irshad Manji opened the summit at Sunday morning, followed by a panel discussions on the topic "Inside the jihadi mind". After the lunch, other panel discussions were held on the topics "Rediscovering secular traditions" and "Separating mosque and state" (with Afshin Ellian). The day was closed with a reception, after which some closed working group meetings were held.

The following morning opened with a panel discussion on "Secularism and Islamic thought." After the lunch ms Zand-Bonazzi released the joint declaration (see below) in a press conference which was followed by an open forum, in which all panelists were invited to participate. The next items on the agenda were a speech by Tawfik Hamid called "Islamism & terrorism: facts, reality & possible solutions" and a final panel discussion on "Women, Children, & Islam."

Wafa Sultan, who participated in the last panel discussion, accepted an award from the Center for Inquiry, saying that she believed there was no such thing as moderate Islam, a view shared by some, but not all, of the attendees.

=== St. Petersburg Declaration ===
Although delegates to the summit "differed sharply on particulars", on March 5 they released a public manifesto calling for reform within Islam. The text, known as the St. Petersburg Declaration, expressed support for the separation of mosque and state, equal protection for all religions, legal and social equality between men and women, and unrestricted critical study of traditional practices in Islam.

Irshad Manji decided not to endorse the declaration, saying it was not sufficiently inclusive of practicing Muslims like herself; she elaborated that being a secular Muslim did not entail renouncing Islam for atheism or another religion, and that support for the separation of mosque and state was not un-Islamic.
