= The Intelligence Summit =

- Founded: 2006
- Founder: John Loftus Chairman's name withheld for security reasons
- Type: Political, Inellligence, International Security, Cryptology
- Purpose: terrorism
- Location: Washington, DC
- Region served: United States
- Method: conferences
- Key people: John Loftus, Michael Cherney
- Revenue: private donations (primarily from Michael Cherney)
- Website: www.intelligencesummit.org via Archive.org

The Intelligence Summit is an annual conference run principally by John Loftus and funded by an organization he controls, the Intelligence and Homeland Security Educational Center (IHEC). The stated purpose of these regular meetings is "to provide an opportunity for the international intelligence community to listen to and learn from each other, and to share ideas in the common war against terrorism."

== Organization ==
According to the Intelligence Summit's website, the meetings are run by organizers (Robert Katz and John Loftus) and an Advisory Council, which includes or included in the past "two former heads of CIA, the head of British Joint Intelligence, senior officials of the Mossad, the former Director of the Congressional Task Force on Terrorism, the former director of the Indian Counter Intelligence Service, generals of the US Army and Air Force intelligence services, and academic experts". Among the Advisory Council members are the author and consultant Yossef Bodansky, special operations expert Richard Marcinko, and retired generals and Fox News military analysts Paul E. Vallely and Tom McInerney.

=== Funding ===
Ron Jacobs notes that the primary sponsor of the conference, Michael Cherney, "is the subject of controversy and is currently denied entry into the United States because of his indictment on various charges in Russia and Israel." Jacobs points out that "Cherney is well-known among supporters of Israel and has contributed millions of dollars to various organizations on the right end of Israel's political spectrum, as well as several thousands to the US Republican Party." St. Petersburg Times confirms that Cherney is the main contributor to the Summit and notes that "the United States has denied Cherney a visa since 1999 because of alleged ties to the Russian mafia." Cherney was listed for organized crime and money laundering on the Interpol Red List of wanted persons. Loftus counters that Cherney "was framed by [former Director of the Office of National Intelligence John] Negroponte."

=== Controversies ===
John Loftus has come under fire from former representatives of the International Holocaust Education Center, who are concerned about him using the organization's tax-exempt status improperly to promote his intelligence activities. The St. Petersburg Times noted that "Walter Loebenberg, who founded the Holocaust Education Center and approved of turning the name over to Loftus in 2005 because of his high regard for him, says that he knew Loftus was doing intelligence work at the time. 'But ... we agreed he would change the name if he did his intelligence work under the name of the Holocaust Education Center. It has gone farther than we expected,' said Loebenberg. 'We never would have organized or sponsored an intelligence conference.'" An Internal Revenue Service spokesperson explained the impropriety: "If a tax-exempt charitable organization changes the name, the purpose or the structure, it must let IRS know by corresponding with us. And, it must remain neutral and nonpartisan."

Loftus has also been criticized for listing sponsors of the Summit who never consented to being so listed, including Konica Minolta and Florida Holocaust Museum board member Bruce Epstein.

== Objectives ==
The Intelligence Summit's emphasis is upon terrorism and jihad related issues; former Jamaa Islamia terrorist and author Tawfik Hamid is on the Summit's Advisory Council. Ahmed Bedier of the Council on American-Islamic Relations noted of Hamid's participation in the Summit, "The Intelligence Summit is a group of neoconservatives and private intelligence agencies that are benefiting from the war on terrorism. And opportunists like Hamid and others at this event are bashing and cashing and making money from it." Legal analyst Victoria Toensing said, "This is not a mainstream conference with recognized names in the field. I've been in the intelligence and terrorism world a long time, and I would not suggest going to this conference for intelligence or terrorism information."

== 2006 Intelligence Summit ==
The Intelligence Summit gained prominence in February 2006, when a conference speaker, former US Deputy Undersecretary of Defense John A. Shaw, asserted that Russia had helped Saddam Hussein smuggle out his WMDs; he also claimed that the DIA and CIA had interfered with his investigations. Shaw's accusations became part of the controversy surrounding the Iraq War. Shaw had been fired from the Department of Defense in 2004 in the wake of an FBI corruption probe allegedly tied to false accusations being used to manipulate contract awards in Iraq. Numerous examples of Shaw's claims were public, including placing stories in the Financial Times and Washington Times, an "official" DoD Report that Shaw produced without authorization and an official DoD press release that was subsequently withdrawn, allegedly with the intent to damage specific competitors and help his "friends" bidding for reconstruction contracts in Iraq. Shaw made these statements in the face of several official investigations to the contrary, most notably the Report of the Iraq Study Group led by Charles Duelfer published on 30 September 2004.

Shortly after the 2006 event, the Bush Administration purportedly ordered government personnel not to associate with The Intelligence Summit or attend its conferences; The New York Sun reported, "(B)oth John Deutch and James Woolsey abruptly left their positions at Intelligence Summit, according to its president, John Loftus, who said their departure is part of a campaign by the Directorate of National Intelligence to punish him for releasing the recordings [of Saddam Hussein]...." Woolsey denied that there had been any pressure to withdraw, stating that "If Loftus is saying that anyone pressured me about this issue he is quite wrong." UPI reported that Deutch and Woolsey resigned from the Board after learning that the conference's primary sponsor was Michael Cherney, who "has been investigated or blacklisted on suspicion of money laundering, illegal business deals and connections to the Russian mafia by half a dozen European countries and barred from entry by the U.S. authorities"

== 2007 Intelligence Summit ==
The 2007 summit was organized with the Secular Islam Summit, which was held simultaneously with the Intelligence Summit. UPI reported of the 2007 conference that "most, if not all panelists seemed to be preaching to the choir. The conference, at times, had an air of a reunion of good ol' boys; all in sync with the program, rather than a group of very serious professionals out to warn the free world of the dangers facing democracies.... Many would rather 'not waste time' talking with a government they say will never keep its word. Instead, they would prefer to simply 'kick butt,' as one speaker put it, and making realistic plans to enable regime change in Syria and Iran through assassinations and intimidation. His comments were received with applause and cheers from the audience."

== See also ==
- Terrorism
- WMD theories in the aftermath of the 2003 Iraq War
- Operation Iraqi Freedom documents
