= John Loftus (military author) =

American writer and radio personality

John Joseph Loftus (born February 12, 1950), is an American author, former high level U.S. government prosecutor, and former Army intelligence officer. He is the president of The Intelligence Summit and was formerly president of the Florida Holocaust Museum in St. Petersburg.

Loftus has authored a number of books alleging ties between the CIA and former Nazis, including The Belarus Secret and The Secret War Against the Jews, both of which have extensive material on the Bush-Rockefeller-Nazi connections.

From 2017 to date, he writes a weekly column called "spyview" for the Haredi Jewish magazine Ami.

== Early career ==
The son of a firefighter, Loftus was born in Boston, Massachusetts, and is a graduate of Boston College (BA, 1971) and Suffolk University (JD, 1977). He served in the U.S. Army from 1971 to 1974, attaining the rank of First Lieutenant. He began working for the US Department of Justice in 1977 and in 1979 joined their Office of Special Investigations, which was charged with prosecuting and deporting Nazi war criminals in the US. Loftus' now-expired website claimed, "As a young U.S. Army officer, John Loftus helped train Israelis on a covert operation that turned the tide of battle in the 1973 Yom Kippur War."

== Author ==
Loftus is the author and co-author of several books on Nazis, espionage, and similar topics including The Belarus Secret (1982), Unholy Trinity: How the Vatican's Nazi Networks Betrayed Western Intelligence to the Soviets (1992), The Secret War Against the Jews: How Western Espionage Betrayed the Jewish People (1994), Unholy Trinity: The Vatican, the Nazis, and the Swiss Banks (1998), America's Nazi Secret: An Insider's History of How the United States Department of Justice Obstructed Congress by: Blocking Congressional Investigations into Famous American Families Who Funded Hitler, Stalin and Arab Terrorists (2010). Although Loftus' first book, The Belarus Secret, is nonfiction, it was adapted into a TV movie, Kojak: The Belarus File (1985), with Telly Savalas.

=== Reception of The Belarus Secret ===
What Loftus had described as the Belarus Secret is that many of the Belarus Brigade's leaders, a unit incorporated into a German SS division, were assisted into the United States after World War II – thanks largely to the efforts of Frank Wisner. In defiance of federal law, Loftus asserted, the Office of Policy Coordination helped obtain visas for Nazi collaborators from Belarus — who were believed to have facilitated numerous atrocities by the Nazi Germany. According to Loftus, it was all part of a Cold War scheme to wage guerrilla warfare in Soviet-occupied Europe, in which the Nazi collaborators were to play a key role. When the project collapsed, however, the Belarusians quickly settled in and obtained US citizenship – and intelligence agencies protected them from exposure for decades.

The Office of Special Investigations historian David Marwell described Loftus' book The Belarus Secret as "the worst kind of amateur history." Vital Zayka, a fellow of the Center for Jewish History in New York City, accused Loftus of falsification. The Israeli historian and Nazi hunter Efraim Zuroff described the book as controversial and referred to Charles R. Allen Jr.'s review in Jewish Currents, in which Allen joined the active criticism of Loftus and named him a fraud and a liar.

The New York Times wrote: "there is a question as to whether the author in his zealousness may not have overstated some of his material. He says 300 Byelorussian Nazis and an 'even larger number of Ukrainian Nazis' were smuggled in. But he fails to draw a distinction between documented war criminals and hangers-on and perhaps other less culpable collaborators. ... Still, The Belarus Secret is certain to be a valuable source book when Congress reopens hearings ... into allegations of a war criminal cover-up."

== Radio talk show host ==
Loftus previously had a radio show on Talkline Communications Network broadcast live every Monday and Tuesday from 11 pm to midnight EST in New York City, northern New Jersey, southern Connecticut, and Miami and Pompano Beach, Florida. His co-host was John Batchelor.

== Social critic ==
Loftus serves as a media commentator, appearing regularly on ABC National Radio and Fox News. He also writes weekly for Ami, an Orthodox Jewish weekly newsmagazine.

On August 7, 2005, he provided the United States address of an alleged terrorist named Iyad K. Hilal on Fox News. Only afterwards was it revealed that Hilal had left the address three years previously and the home was now owned by a family, who was then subjected to threats and vandalism and required police protection as a result of Loftus' words. Fox terminated Loftus's contract to commentate after the event. Loftus said "I thought it might help police in that area now that we have positively identified a terrorist," but he did not say why he did not contact police directly. Loftus apologized for the mistake and expressed frustration about "one federal [agency's]" inaction on an earlier tip he had given them years ago due to the same address.

== Selected publications ==
- The Belarus Secret: The Nazi Connection in America. New York City: Alfred A. Knopf (later Paragon House). 1982. ISBN 1557781389. Revised and expanded as America's Nazi Secret: An Insider's History of How the United States Department of Justice Obstructed Congress by: Blocking Congressional Investigations into Famous American Families Who Funded Hitler, Stalin and Arab Terrorists; Lying to Congress, the GAO, and the CIA about the Postwar Immigration of Eastern European Nazi War Criminals to the US; and Concealing from the 9/11 Investigators the Role of the Arab Nazi War Criminals in Recruiting Modern Middle Eastern Terrorist Groups. Walterville, Oregon: TrineDay. 2010. ISBN 978-1936296040.
- Valhalla's Wake: The IRA, MI6, and the Assassination of a Young American (1st ed.). New York City: Atlantic Monthly Press. 1989. ISBN 0871132478.
- Unholy Trinity: The Vatican, the Nazis, and Soviet Intelligence (1st U.S. ed.). New York City: St. Martin's Press. 1991. ISBN 0312094078. Also published as Ratlines: How the Vatican's Nazi Networks Betrayed Western Intelligence to the Soviets. London, England: Heinemann. April 1991. ISBN 0434829447. Released in a new and revised edition as Unholy Trinity: The Vatican, the Nazis, and the Swiss Banks. New York City: St. Martin's Press. 1998. ISBN 031218199X.
- The Secret War Against the Jews: How Western Espionage Betrayed the Jewish People. New York City: St. Martin's Press. 1994. ISBN 031209535X.
- "Remembering the Holocaust" (PDF). Stetson Law Review. 30: 351–360. 2000.
- "The Dutch Connection". chomsky-must-read.blogspot.com. September 2000.
- The Witness Tree: A Novel. Toronto, Ontario, Canada: Vintage Canada. 2007. ISBN 978-0307369604.

== See also ==
- Dave Emory
