= Mark A. Rayner =

Canadian writer

Mark A. Rayner is a Canadian author of science fiction, satire, and humour from London, Ontario. His most recent books are The Gates of Polished Horn (Donovan Street Press, 2025.), Alpha Max (Monkeyjoy Press, 2021.) and The Fatness (Monkeyjoy Press, 2017.) The latter won and IndieReader Discovery award for humor and an Independent Book Publishers Association award for humor (silver). His first novel, The Amadeus Net, was published by ENC Press in New York in 2005 and his second novel, Marvellous Hairy, was published by Crossing Chaos Enigmatic Ink in 2009 (2e Monkeyjoy Press, 2010.) His third novel, The Fridgularity (Monkeyjoy Press, 2012.) is a satire of Internet culture and the technological singularity, and won an IndieReader Discovery Award for humor. Pirate Therapy and Other Cures is a collection of humorous, absurd and satirical short fiction, published by Monkeyjoy Press in early 2012. He has also written numerous short stories, including: Hounding Manny [Oceans of the Mind], A Reluctant Emcee [Abyss & Apex] and Any Port in a Storm [Parsec]. He has been nominated for the Prix Aurora Award (for short fiction) three times.

The Gates of Polished Horn was selected by the Toronto Star as one of its 20 favourite fiction books of 2025.

Rayner teaches in the Faculty of Information and Media Studies at The University of Western Ontario. He is a member of The Writers' Union of Canada, and is a founding member of The Emily Chesley Reading Circle. He is also the co-host of the Re-Creative podcast.
