= Michael Cherney =

Israeli entrepreneur and industrialist

- מיכאל צ'רנוי
- Born: 16 January 1952 (age 74); Tashkent, Uzbek SSR, Soviet Union
- Occupation: Businessman

Michael Cherney (Hebrew: מיכאל צ'רנוי, Russian: Михаил Семёнович Черной, romanized: Mikhail Semyonovich Chernoy; born 16 January 1952) is an Israeli entrepreneur and industrialist. He is known for his significant role in the 1990s aluminium industry in Russia, and his business ventures in Israel. He is also the founder of the Michael Cherney Foundation and a sponsor of The Intelligence Summit.

== Biography ==
Cherney grew up in Tashkent, Uzbek SSR, in an Ashkenazi Jewish family. He is the eldest of three sons; his father was a book-keeper and an engineer. At the age of fourteen, Cherney started working, as he joined his father on moonlighting jobs. After high school, he was drafted into the Soviet Army and attended a technical college. Later, his athletic pursuits – boxing and football – led to employment in sports administration.

In the early 1990s Cherney immigrated to Israel but kept close ties to Bulgaria, where he had bought a leading newspaper, a top football team and Bulgaria's only mobile phone company, Mobiltel. In August 2000 Bulgarian authorities denounced what they said were his ties to foreign criminal rackets and expelled him, saying he could not return to Bulgaria for 10 years.

Furthermore, the United States has "denied Cherney a visa since 1999 because of alleged ties to the Russian mafia, according to St. Petersburg Times in Florida".

Cherney is wanted on an Interpol international arrest warrant on allegations of money laundering and organized crime, but in June 2010 The Jerusalem Post reported that Cherney is preparing an application to contest it before the European Court of Human Rights.

In August 2010 the Israeli TV Channel Two aired a short program about the most expensive and lavish wedding ceremony in Israel until that time, costing 20 million ILS (about 5 million US dollars). The program revealed that the bride was Cherney's daughter, that the wedding was paid by him and that Israeli ministers and members of parliament (Knesset) of Russian origin attended.

== Business interests ==
=== TWG and founding of the Russian aluminium industry ===
Cherney, together with his brother Lev Cherney and UK metals traders David and Simon Reuben, founded Trans-World Group (TWG) – the first and largest private company in Russia, which produced aluminium and sold it on Western markets. BusinessWeek reports that the brothers "were known for their rough style of doing business". Sam Kislin was a partner of Michael Cherney in Trans World.

In 1997, Russia's Interior Minister Anatoly Kulikov linked both the Cherney brothers and Reuben brothers to the Izmaylovskaya mafia which was led by Anton Malevsky in Israel, but, in March 1998, Boris Yeltsin removed Kulikov from his post.

According to a 7 May 2000 Top Secret magazine (Russian: Совершенно секретно) article by Yulia Latynina, the Cherney brothers krysha (Russian: крыша) or "roof" were the Izmailovskaya mafia, Oleg Soskovets (Russian: Олег Сосковец), and Alexander Korzhakov (Russian: Александр Коржаков).

In 1994, TWG was drawn into a government inquiry into the theft of more than $US100 million from Russia's central bank by a number of separate criminal groups during the early 1990s. In an article on TWG, Fortune magazine reported: "That a theft occurred is not in dispute, nor is the fact that the Cherneys ended up with a piece of the stolen money and used it to partially fund Trans World's startup phase in 1992.... The inquiry's objective was to determine whether the Cherneys knew the funds were indeed stolen."

In an attempt to clean up its reputation and refute allegations of questionable business practices, the Reuben brothers hired Mayer Brown & Platt, a US-based law firm. Terrence Burke, an investigator employed by the law firm and former acting head of the DEA, recommended that the Reubens sever their ties with Cherney after the FBI told him that "it believed Michael himself was an organised crime figure." As a result, Michael was paid $US400 million "just to go away" while his brother Lev remained with the company.

In August 2001 a Fortune article notes, "the prosecutor's office in Düsseldorf notified the Reuben brothers that it had terminated its probe into alleged money laundering, saying 'I hereby confirm expressly that there is no remaining suspicion of money laundering or any other criminal actions.'" However, the same article states that the Kroll report "doesn't discuss an essential part of the story", nor does it "explore the complex business and financial relationships in Russia between the Reubens and Lev and Michael Cherney."

=== SuAl and partnership with Oleg Deripaska ===
According to the Financial Times, in 1994, Oleg Deripaska, then an independent metals trader, won the backing of Cherney and TWG to become general manager of Sayansk aluminium plant in Siberia, which lead to formation of SibAl and a partnership between Cherney and Oleg Deripaska in this company.

Cherney had joint ventures with Deripaska in Blonde, Operator Trade Center, CCT, and Arufa between 1995 and 1998. Also, Cherney and Deripaska were partners with Anton Malevsky, who was a leader of the Izmailovskaya OPG (Russian: Измайловская преступная группа), in the coal industry, and Sergei Popov, who was a leader of the Podolskaya OPG (Russian: Подольская ОПГ), in the fashion industry.

=== BulgarTabac ===
In 2026, 80% of the capital in the Bulgarian State-owned tobacco company, Bulgartabac, was placed on the market. In April 2002 Cherney put together a three-partner consortium called "Metatabac" to bid for Bulgartabac. Ownership was structured between three groups: the Russian firm Soyuzcontracttabac, which owned 35%, MCG Holdings, a firm owned by Cherney, which owned 35%, and another 30% held by a Cypriot company named Metacontact Ltd.

=== Mobiltel ===
In 1997, he bought Mobitel from Grigory Luchansky. In 2002 Cherney was involved in the selling-on of the Bulgarian mobile provider Mobiltel. Cherney bought the company together with Austrian business men Martin Schlaff, former minister of the Austrian People's Party Josef Taus, and financial expert Herbert Cordt. The 768 million Euro deal was financed by BAWAG P.S.K. In 2005 Mobiltel was sold for 1.6 billion euros to Mobilkom Austria Group with a huge profit of 830 million Euros. Critics found it hard to understand "why the state bought an asset for such a high price from someone who was effectively a go-between who stood to pocket a fat profit, rather than directly from the original owner of the company".

=== Gad Zeevi ===
In 2001, Zeev Fraiman (Russian: Зеев Фрайман), an Israeli economics expert, claimed that Gad Zeevi (Russian: Гад Зэеви) was a partner with Cherney in the telephone monopoly Bezeq (Russian: "Безек") during its earliest stages of privatization.

== The Intelligence Summit ==
Cherney is the founder and primary sponsor of the Intelligence Summit. In February 2006, The New York Sun reported that John Deutch and James Woolsey had resigned from the Intelligence Summit's board of advisers after receiving information that the conference's primary sponsor, Cherney, had "alleged ties to the Russian mafia".

== Illegal investigations ==
=== Invalid passport ===
On 21 May 1994, Cherney and his future wife were detained by immigration officers on arrival in Heathrow from Geneva. It was discovered that they had attempted to enter the UK on false Polish passports and they were deported back to Switzerland.

The following day they were arrested by the Swiss police on the grounds that they had made use of false identities. Both were searched and found to be in possession of two allegedly invalid Polish driving licences. Cherney gave a statement to the police in which he admitted using a Polish passport in an attempt to enter the UK, which had been successful previously. On 25 October 1994 the Swiss authorities confirmed that they would not be pressing any charges against Cherney. On 20 November 1996 the Swiss Federal Aliens Office confirmed that he was no longer subject to a prohibition order and that there was nothing to prevent his coming into Switzerland.

=== Alleged legal payments to Avigdor Lieberman ===
Cherney is a close friend of Avigdor Lieberman who allegedly received millions of shekels from various entrepreneurs, including Cherney, while serving as member of Knesset; under Israeli law, MKs are not allowed to receive any payment beyond their salary. One claim is that Cherney paid a company called Path to the East large amounts of money between the years 1999 and 2006, and that these sums were then allegedly passed on to Lieberman as a bribe. Other allegations concern a company called M.L.1, founded by Lieberman's daughter Michal when she was 21. These allegations concern money transferred to M.L.1 from unknown sources outside Israel; the money was later allegedly used for paying salaries to Avigdor and Michal Lieberman.

In April 2007, Israeli police questioned Avigdor Lieberman, Israel's Deputy Prime Minister, on suspicions of illegally financing his 2001 electoral campaign. According to the police, in May 2001, three months after Lieberman was appointed Minister of Infrastructure in Ariel Sharon's Cabinet, approximately $US500,000 was transferred to the bank accounts of Lieberman associates through Cyprus. This money could be traced back to Cherney. Cherney's attorney, Yaakov Weinroth, said the money was transferred by his client "for a totally transparent, legal wine deal".

In May 2011, Haaretz reported that the Israeli Attorney General had issued a draft indictment against Avigdor Lieberman for fraud and money laundering, including allegations against Cherney. It began when Lieberman established a Cyprus company and an Israeli company in 1997. A second Haaretz article detailing the draft indictment reported that a company owned by Cherney had paid $US500,000 to a company owned by Avigdor Lieberman in May 2001. It added, "Prosecutors say Lieberman then used his government posts to try to restore Cherney's Israeli passport, which he had been stripped of in 1999, and to assist him in other personal matters." Cherney was acquitted. Over the years, Cherney's passport was returned by the Israeli authorities.

=== Bezeq affair ===
In 1999, businessman Gad Zeevi purchased shares in the Israeli telecommunications company Bezeq on behalf of businesses he owned. According to an indictment filed in 2004, Cherney provided the financial guarantee for the purchase—information that Cherney and Zeevi hid from the banks financing the deal, in fear that Cherney's direct involvement would not be approved by the Israeli ministry of communications. In 2015, Cherney, Zeevi and a number of other defendants were cleared of all charges, with the court stating that the information had not in fact been hidden, and the fact that Cherney loaned the necessary funds to Zeevi did not constitute fraud against Bezeq.

=== Spanish allegations and attempted arrest in the United Kingdom ===
According to sources cited in the Spanish daily El Mundo, Spanish authorities sought Cherney in connection to "Operation Avispa" (Operation Wasp), a 2005 investigation that had resulted in the arrest of several prominent Russian mafia figures. The investigators believe that Cherney managed several Spanish businesses, registered in Alicante and Levante, used by the mafia for money laundering of 4 million euros.

In May 2009, Spain's Supreme Court issued a detention order against Cherney. Along with his business partners Oleg Deripaska (head of RusAl) and Iskander Makhmudov (head of UGMK), Cherney is suspected of laundering money. The Spanish authorities claim they succeeded in tracing the organization's complicated money laundering track, including Deripaska's, Makhmudov's and Cherney's alleged participation. As a result, Interpol issued an international arrest warrant against Cherney.

== Lawsuit against Oleg Deripaska ==
On 24 November 2006, Cherney filed a suit against Oleg Deripaska, a Russian billionaire who owns the huge Russian aluminium company, RusAl, in the Commercial Court of London's High Court. Cherney sought a Court declaration affirming that Deripaska holds 20% of the RusAl shares on behalf of Cherney or damages for breach of Deripaska's agreement to dispose of the shares and to account to Cherney for the proceeds. The claims are based on a written agreement between the two businessmen that was signed in a London hotel room in March 2001. Deripaska denies that Cherney owns shares and said in an affidavit that his relationship with Cherney was one of a businessman being extorted by a crime boss. After the 2001 meeting, Deripaska paid Cherney $US250 million.

As of December 2006 RusAl was in the final stages of negotiating a takeover of domestic rival SuAl and the aluminium assets of Glencore, a major Swiss commodities trader, which could create a new company valued at up to $US30 billion. According to this estimate, Cherney's 20 percent stake in RusAl could be worth as much as $US3 billion. On 3 July 2008, a British judge ruled that Cherney had the right to sue Deripaska for £2 billion. High Court Justice Christopher Clarke ruled that Cherney might be assassinated or held on trumped-up charges if he tried to bring the case in Russia.

At a June 2011 case management conference, the judge deferred a decision on whether Cherney would be allowed to give evidence by video link from Israel rather than appear in person as an outstanding Interpol arrest warrant means he would be detained if he visited the UK. In late July 2011, the High Court ruled that Cherney may give evidence at the trial by video link from Israel and set trial for April 2012. The case was settled out of court between Cherney and Deripaska in September 2012.

=== Illegal wiretaps ===
On 13 January 2010, a Tel Aviv Court handed down its first verdict in the case of illegal eavesdropping on Cherney. Aviv Mor, a private investigator was found guilty of illegally gathering information of personal nature - in particular, tapping the phones of Cherney and sentenced to a plea bargained result which handed down a 14-month sentence to Mor. Part of the sentence will be in the form of community service and the rest will be a suspended sentence. The District attorney's office stated in court that the cases of other suspects in the illegal data collection case "are at an advanced stage and close to indictment ." In February 2008 Cherney filed a suit in a Tel Aviv court that alleged the illegal spying was commissioned by a Russian citizen, Alexei Drobashenko, who at the time was the head of the External Relations department at Basic Element, a financial and industrial group that belongs to Oleg Deripaska. Cherney claimed that it was this Russian oligarch, acting through Drobashenko, who had hired Eskin, Pridan and Mor. In his claim, Cherney accused a group of 10 plotters, including Oleg Deripaska, Alexei Drobashenko and the already sentenced Aviv Mor, of illegal wiretapping, hacking the computers of his charity fund, publishing slanderous articles, and harassing him with insulting graffiti and leaflets.

== Personal life ==
Cherney was in a relationship with businesswoman Nicol Raidman. They got engaged in 2019, but broke up later that year. They have two children, Michelle (born 2010) and Richard (born 2014). He lives in Herzliya.
