= John A. Shaw =

American businessman and government official (1939–2020)

Jack Shaw

Deputy Undersecretary of Defense for International Technology Security
- In office September 6, 2001 – December 11, 2004

Assistant Secretary of Commerce for Export Enforcement
- In office September 12, 1991 – 1993

Associate Deputy Secretary of the Department of Commerce
- In office 1988–1991

Administrator of the Agency for International Development
- In office 1988–1988

Vice President for Washington Operations for the Hudson Institute
- In office 1987–1988

Personal details
- Born: July 1, 1939 (age 87) Philadelphia, PA, U.S.
- Died: April 5, 2020 Chevy Chase, Maryland U.S.
- Party: Republican
- Spouse: Deborah Rossiter
- Children: 2
- Education: Kent School (1957)
- Alma mater: Williams College (1962); Cambridge University (1967 1976)

John Arthur "Jack" Shaw (July 1, 1939 – April 5, 2020) was an American civil servant who held positions under several presidents: Senior Staff under Richard Nixon, White House liaison under Gerald Ford, and in the State Department under Ronald Reagan. Additionally, President George H. W. Bush gave him a recess appointment as Assistant Secretary of Commerce.

His last presidential appointment was as Deputy Undersecretary of Defense for International Technology Security, under George W. Bush. Shaw was accused of improper advocacy for private contracts, which led to his dismissal, but a subsequent FBI investigation resulted in no charges against him.

Shaw returned to the private sector and was president and CEO of the American Overseas Clinics Corporation.

== Early life, education, and professorships ==
Shaw was born into a prominent Philadelphia political family, and was raised in the suburbs by an aunt and uncle due to the early death of his parents. Shaw graduated from Kent School in Connecticut in 1957. He then received a B.A. from Williams College in 1962, where he was a member of St. Anthony Hall, as well as a Masters (1967), and Ph.D. (1976) from Cambridge University, where he was a Fellow of Magdalene College. He has taught international security studies at Cambridge University, Williams College, Georgetown University, and the Institut d'Etudes Politiques in Paris.

During his professorship at Williams College, he invested his own time and money to found the Williams College men's rowing team, despite some resistance from the Williams faculty and administration at the time. In recognition of Shaw's perseverance, one of the shells in the John A. Shaw Boathouse is named Pride and Persistence. Additionally, a Silver Goblet bearing his name is given out each year to a male rower who epitomizes his will to keep fighting in the face of adversity. Thanks to Shaw's efforts in the early 1970s Williams has become a minor US rowing power, with the men winning successive championships and the women winning seven successive NCAA Division III Rowing Championships.

== Career from 1975 to 2000 ==
Shaw has held a number of positions in the executive branch of the U.S. Government, in business, and at think tanks.

=== Ford administration and then the private sector ===
In 1975 under President Ford, Shaw was confirmed by the Senate as Inspector General of Foreign Assistance and Assistant Secretary of State, responsible for the oversight of all U.S. Foreign Military Sales, U.S. AID, the Peace Corps, the Overseas Private Investment Corporation, and the Export-Import Bank.

From 1978 to 1980, Shaw returned to the private sector as a Vice President of Booz Allen & Hamilton International, overseeing the development, organization and management of two new industrial cities, Jubail and Yanbu, in Saudi Arabia. These cities constituted the largest development project in the world. He worked for several management consulting companies, the St. Phalle International Group and the Cambridge Consulting Group, overseeing international business development projects. From 1980 to 1984 he was a Senior Fellow at the Center for Strategic and International Studies, specializing in Middle Eastern and International Business Affairs. While there, he co-authored a favorably reviewed study titled Saudi Arabian Modernization: The Impact of Change on Stability. Shaw was vice president for Washington Operations for the Hudson Institute, then overseeing the Center for Naval Analyses, from 1985 to 1986.

=== Reagan and G.H.W. Bush administrations ===
From 1986 to 1988 under President Reagan he served as senior advisor to the Administrator of Agency for International Development. From 1989 to 1991 he served as Associate Deputy Secretary and Chief Operating Officer of the Department of Commerce, and oversaw a major effort to reform the Bureau of Export Administration.

On September 13, 1991, he was appointed by President George H. W. Bush as Assistant Secretary of Commerce for Export Enforcement, replacing Quincy Mellon Crosby. Shaw received a recess appointment when the revised Export Administration Act was vetoed.

With the arrival of the Clinton Administration, Shaw returned to the private sector. During this time he worked as CEO of American Overseas Clinics Corporation (AOCC).

== Career during and after G.W. Bush administration ==
Defense Secretary Donald Rumsfeld appointed Shaw in October 2001 to head the new Office of International Technology Security. In that capacity, he became responsible for controlling export of sensitive technology.

=== Iraq weapons of mass destruction (WMD) allegation ===
As head of the Office of International Technology Security, Shaw tracked Saddam Hussein's weapons programs before and after the 2003 invasion of Iraq, and he has said that Russia helped move them to Syria. On February 18, 2006, Shaw told a conference at The Intelligence Summit in Alexandria, Virginia:

The short answer to that question of where the W.M.D. Saddam bought from the Russians went was that they went to Syria and Lebanon. ... They were moved by Russian units out of uniform, that were specifically sent to Iraq to move the weaponry and eradicate any evidence of its existence.

Shaw alleged that Evgeny Primakov flew to Baghdad in December, 2002 to arrange the shipments, which Primakov denied.

=== Charges of corruption fabricated and disproven ===
Shaw made several authorized trips to Iraq, although a former official with the Coalition Provisional Authority (CPA) alleged to the L.A. Times that Shaw gained unauthorized access to one site: the port of Umm al Qasr. Shaw urged U.S. officials to hire a company called Nana Pacific, owned by Alaskan natives and therefore eligible for no-bid contracts. Nana could sub-contract some work, including dredging at Umm al Qasr, and setting up communications systems. According to a former CPA official: "The notion was that this might well be a vehicle where you could in fact get things moving quickly that needed to be done. ... "

Nana Pacific, which is an 8(a) company, was granted a contract worth up to $70 million for work on the port, subcontracting $3.5 million in dredging work to SSA Marine, and both companies were represented by Richard Powers who was a friend of Shaw. As for the communications systems, neither Nana Pacific nor its proposed subcontractor (Guardian Net whose board included a friend of Shaw's named Don DeMarino) nor a related consortium called Liberty Mobile (which included DeMarino and the telecom company Qualcomm), were given that contract, about which Shaw took three notable actions. First, Shaw questioned the validity of contracts awarded to other companies. Second, he allegedly told the staff of Daniel Sudnick, a senior U.S. adviser to the Iraqi Ministry of Communications, that there would be "hell to pay" if the contract for a first responder communication system did not include a provision holding out the possibility of later expansion to a nationwide commercial CDMA network, instead of ruling out CDMA. Third, Shaw sought to have the Iraqi communications minister replaced with Sami al-Majoun, his deputy minister, who was in the Liberty Mobile consortium.

Sudnick requested an investigation of Shaw's conduct. Shaw then suggested that Sudnick resign, and opposed Sudnick at the Pentagon. Sudnick was fired in April 2004, and subsequently sued Shaw and the Department of Defense for allegedly suggesting to third parties that Sudnick was under investigation for bribery. In December 2004, Shaw was fired. In 2005, the FBI declined to charge Shaw, adding that it vigorously investigates corruption allegations. In 2007, Sudnick permanently dismissed all remaining claims against Shaw, with no admissions by Shaw, nor any finding against him.

=== Subsequent private sector career ===
Shaw returned to the Cambridge Consulting Group, serving as its president. In that capacity, he has been involved with technology consulting for the Defense Department. Since 2007, he has also been an advisory board member at NeXplore Corporation, a software company that develops Internet properties and applications primarily in the United States.

== Personal life ==
Shaw was first married to Deborah Rossiter, daughter of Harry Sayen Rossiter Jr. with whom he had two children. His second wife and widow is Helen Anderson Shaw. Shaw resided in suburban Chevy Chase, MD Washington, D.C. He was a national leader in St. Anthony Hall ( AKA Delta Psi fraternity ) for decades. Shaw died on April 5, 2020, at his home in Chevy Chase, Maryland.
