= Banafsheh Zand-Bonazzi =

Iranian writer, film producer and activist (born 1961)

Banafsheh Zand-Bonazzi (Persian: بنفشه زند بونازی; born 1961) is an Iranian writer, film producer and human rights activist.

== Life ==
Zand-Bonazzi was born in Tehran to journalist parents Siamak Pourzand and Mehrangiz Kar. She attended the American University of Paris as well as at the IDHEC, the Institute for the Advanced Cinematographic Studies. In 1982, she went to the United States and continued her studies at the University of Maryland, Baltimore County. She studied film and art history as well as linguistics and semiotics.

In 1993, Banafsheh returned to the world of TV production, as a freelance line producer of documentary films.

In 2001, her father, Siamak Pourzand, became a political prisoner in Iran. He committed suicide in 2011, in what Zand said was a protest against the government.

Banafsheh regularly writes for National Review, Defense & Foreign Affairs and FrontPage Magazine. She is a regular commentator on Iranian politics on the John Batchelor Show and has appeared on C-SPAN's Washington Journal and Voice of America TV, and Fox TV with Eric Shawn.

Banafsheh is also the editor of the English department of the website Iran Press News. She also edits Iranian news service, Planet-Iran.com.

== Activism ==
Zand-Bonazzi is a member of the board of advisers of the International Free Press Society. In 2007, she helped organize in the St Petersburg (Florida) Secular Islam Summit, which she addressed along with other thinkers and reformers of Islam such as Ayaan Hirsi Ali, Wafa Sultan and Irshad Manji. The group released the St Petersburg Declaration which urges world governments to, among other things, reject Sharia law, fatwa courts, clerical rule, and state-sanctioned religion in all their forms; oppose all penalties for blasphemy and apostasy, which the signers believe to be in accordance with Article 18 of the Universal Declaration of Human Rights.

== Works/Publications ==
- Hassan Rouhani, In His Own Words
- From Bogota to Tehran
- Who Is Hassan Rouhani?
- Laundering Khatemi
- The Iran Regime's Tehran-DC Fantasy Flight
- Hassan Rouhani to Again Take Over as Nuclear Negotiator
- Iran & Russia to Hold Joint Naval Maneuvers in Caspian Sea
- Academy of Motion Picture Arts & Sciences Champions Iranian Dissident Filmmaker Jafar Panahi

== Litigation against Iran in the United States ==
In 2019, Banafsheh Zand and Mr. Pourzand's wife Mehrangiz Kar, and his U.S. citizen daughter, Azadeh Pourzand filed a complaint against Islamic Republic of Iran and IRGC for torturing, hostage taking, and extrajudicial killing of Mr. Pourzand under FSIA. On September 30, 2022, Judge John Bates ordered that Iran is liable for torturing and hostage taking of Mr. Pourzand. The Court awarded compensatory damages totaling, with prejudgment interest, $17,403,063.01 for Plaintiffs. The Court will also award punitive damages of $17,403,063.01. Plaintiffs’ total award is $34,806,126.02. Ali Herischi was the attorney for Plaintiffs.
