= Muslim Reform Movement =

U.S.-based organization devoted to reform in Islam

- Formation: December 4, 2015; 10 years ago
- Founded at: Washington, D.C., U.S.
- Website: muslimreformmovement.org

The Muslim Reform Movement is a U.S.-based organization dedicated to reform in Islam based on values of peace, human rights, and secular governance.

The organization was founded on December 4, 2015, when the founders read a "Declaration of Reform" at the National Press Club in Washington, D.C. The founders then went to the Saudi-affiliated Islamic Center of Washington and posted the Declaration of Reform on the doors of mosque "denouncing violent jihad, rejecting Islamic statism and opposing the 'ideology of violent Islamic extremism.'" Founding signatories of the Muslim Reform Movement are Asra Nomani, Tahir Aslam Gora, Tawfik Hamid, Usama Hasan, Arif Humayun, Farahnaz Ispahani, Zuhdi Jasser, Naser Khader, Courtney Lonergan, Hasan Mahmud, Raheel Raza, Sohail Raza, Salma Siddiqui and Safdar Ahmad.

Announcing the founding of the Muslim Reform Movement on NBC's Meet the Press on December 6, 2015, Asra Nomani said,

... we are opposing a very real interpretation of Islam that espouses violence, social injustice, and political Islam ... The problem is sitting in the birthplace of Islam, in Mecca, Saudi Arabia, where this interpretation of Islam has gone out into the world over the last four decades, creating militancy groups from Indonesia, to now, San Bernardino, California, vicious attack. We have to take back the faith. And we have to take it back with the principles of peace, social justice, and human rights, women's rights, and secularize governance ... we've had enough.

== See also ==
- Freedom of speech
- Islamic Modernism
- Liberalism and progressivism within Islam
- Islam and modernity
- Women's rights
