= The Trouble with Islam Today =

2004 book by Irshad Manji

The trouble with Islam today : a wake-up call for honesty and change
- Original cover of The Trouble with Islam today
- Author: Irshad Manji
- Language: English
- Genre: Current affairs
- Publisher: Vintage Canada
- Publication date: 2005
- Publication place: Canada
- Media type: Book
- Pages: 257
- ISBN: 0-679-31361-3
- Dewey Decimal: 297
- LC Class: BP169 .M285 2005

The Trouble with Islam Today, originally titled The Trouble with Islam, is a 2004 book critical of Islam written by Irshad Manji, styled as an open letter to concerned citizens worldwide, Muslim or not.

== Contents ==
In the book the author aims to provide an examination of what she describes as "the inferior treatment of women in Islam"; "Jew-bashing that so many Muslims persistently engage in", "the continuing scourge of slavery in countries ruled by Islamic regimes", "literalist readings of the Koran" and "the lost traditions of critical thinking (Ijtihad)".

"The Trouble with Islam is an open letter from me, a Muslim voice of reform, to concerned citizens worldwide – Muslim and not. It's about why my faith community needs to come to terms with the diversity of ideas, beliefs and people in our universe, and why non-Muslims have a pivotal role in helping us get there." - "That doesn't mean I refuse to be a Muslim, it simply means I refuse to join an army of automatons in the name of Allah."

In the book, Manji says that an Arab failure to accept the Jews' historical bond with Palestine is a mistake. Manji writes that the Jews' historical roots stretch back to the land of Israel, and that they have a right to a Jewish state. She further argues that the allegation of apartheid in Israel is deeply misleading, noting that there are in Israel several Arab political parties; that Arab-Muslim legislators have veto powers; and that Arab parties have overturned disqualifications. She also writes that Israel has a free Arab press; that road signs bear Arabic translations; and that Arabs live and study alongside Jews.

== Chapters ==
- "The Letter"
- "How I Became a Muslim Refusenik"
- "Seventy Virgins?"
- "When Did We Stop Thinking?"
- "Gates and Girdles"
- "Who's Betraying Whom?"
- "The Hidden Underbelly of Islam"
- "Operation Ijtihad"
- "In Praise of Honesty"
- "Thank God for the West"

== Editions ==
- The Trouble with Islam, St. Martin's Press (hardcover), 2004, ISBN 0-312-32699-8
- The Trouble with Islam Today, St. Martin's Griffin (paperback), 2005, ISBN 0-312-32700-5

Translations:

- Finnish: Islamin kahdet kasvot, Tammi (paperback), 2004, ISBN 951-31-3076-2, translated by Tiina Sjelvgren
- Urdu, Arabic, and Persian editions are available on her website
- Many other translations exist, from Hindi to German

== Reception ==
The Trouble with Islam Today has been translated into more than 30 languages. Manji has made multiple translations of the book (namely Arabic, Urdu, Malay and Persian) available for free download on her website, with the intention of reaching readers in those countries where her book is banned.

Since its publication, the book has been met with both praise and criticism from Muslim and non-Muslim sources. Khaleel Mohammed, an imam and professor of Islam at San Diego State University, wrote in his foreword to Manji's book that "Irshad wants us to do what our Holy Book wants us to do: end the tribal posturing, open our eyes, and stand up to oppression, even if it's rationalized by our vaunted imams."

Jane Mansbridge, Adams Professor of Political Leadership and Democratic Values at Harvard University, suggests that Manji's book "[carries] a fresh and convincing message to the coming generation", while Andrew Sullivan, in a book review for The New York Times called Manji "courageous" and opined that the book's spirit is "long overdue".

Khaled Almeena, editor of the Arab News in Saudi Arabia, called the book "fraudulent" and stated that it misrepresents itself as a guide to Islam.

Quantara, a website promoting interfaith dialogue, mentions that "Irshad Manji breaks every taboo in the book while also challenging our prejudices about Islam. What's more, she does so as a Muslim, not as a Westernized woman preaching from the pulpit of a feminist ivory tower."

Tarek Fatah, a fellow Canadian Muslim, who originally criticized The Trouble With Islam, reversed his stance by saying that Manji was "right about the systematic racism in the Muslim world" and that "there were many redeeming points in her memoir".

== See also ==
- Criticism of Islam
- Criticism of Islamism
- Muslim Zionism
