= Lone Star Iconoclast =

The Lone Star Iconoclast was founded in December 2000 in Clifton, Texas to cover the area of Crawford, Texas, reportedly as a community newspaper. Its initial publications mirrored small-town life and centered on community events. The editors quickly switched to emphasizing politics and activism in its coverage, and some believed that the only reason for the creation of the paper was the proximity of President George W. Bush.

The newspaper is published by Smith Media, Inc. The newspaper's editor-in-chief is W. Leon Smith, and its senior editors Don. M. Fisher, Nathan Diebenow and Deborah Mathews. The publication is also host to columnists Jerry Tenuto, Paul Derrick, Melinda Pillsbury-Foster, Lloyd Garver, Bartee Haile and Ned Hickson. Additionally, The Lone Star Iconoclast features investigative reporter Stephen Webster, who has penned a number of the publication's more widely read features since 2005.

In 2004, the Iconoclast endorsed John Kerry for president. In 2000, prior to the creation of the Iconoclast, another of Smith's newspapers, The Clifton Record, had endorsed Bush as perhaps becoming "a uniter, not a divider" in Washington.

The result of the 2004 editorial was a boycott of the newspaper in Crawford and other areas of Central Texas, including cancellation of most of its subscriptions and virtually all of its advertisements. The editors claimed to experience retribution in the form of threats and promises of financial ruin followed, with thousands of phone calls, letters, e-mails, and personal visits to the newspaper.

But as people from throughout the country became aware of what happened and the editorial began to be republished in newspapers throughout the world and on Internet sites, new subscriptions came in, as did several support advertisements, which have helped the newspaper survive.

The editorial "John Kerry Will Restore American Dignity" was eventually read by millions worldwide, becoming one of the most-read single editorials ever, and catapulted The Iconoclast to worldwide attention and resulted in scores of international media interviews of its publisher. The editorial uncovered the "hidden agenda" of the Bush administration and took to task the federal debt, attempts to privatize Social Security, the administration's staunch opposition to stem cell research, the President's failed handling of the aftermath of 9/11, and the lies that led to the war in Iraq.

Shortly after publication of the editorial, due to an immediate lack of local support and funding, the newspaper was transformed into an independent national publication, with emphasis on politics and stories that other members of the mainstream media often tend to ignore or dismiss as left-wing conspiracy theories, such as the dangers of depleted uranium radiation, certain attacks upon First Amendment rights (notably only ones that are restrictive to the voice of the radical left) and their perceived costs of America's War on Drugs.

In August 2005, the Iconoclast provided extensive coverage of Cindy Sheehan’s journey to Crawford to ask the president "for what noble cause" her son Casey died in Iraq. This coverage resulted in the Iconoclast staff writing a book, The Vigil — 26 Days In Crawford, Texas, which was designed to detail how a peaceful series of protests can be held and to document an event that gave life to this century's first major anti-war movement. The book was self-published; it has not been determined how many if any copies actually were sold.

In August 2006, the Iconoclast published a story titled "Under Fire! U.S. Army Intelligence Analyst Targeted For Suggesting New Independent 9/11 Investigation". The investigative piece was penned by reporter Stephen Webster, and was widely circulated among the 9/11 Truth Movement. The 9/11 Truth Movement is a conspiracy theory movement exploring possible connections between the Bush administration and the September 11, 2001 attacks. The story detailed the plight of Sergeant First Class Donald Buswell, an Army intelligence analyst and veteran of both wars in Iraq. SFC Buswell is the holder of a Purple Heart for injuries sustained in April 2004, when his convoy was hit by a rocket.

SFC Buswell, the Iconoclast revealed, had responded to a mass e-mail about the September 11, 2001 conspiracy theories. Buswell argued to the sender that there are many unanswered questions about the events of that day, and claimed he feels a new investigation is necessary. The following day, Buswell was placed under investigation by Colonel Luke S. Green, Chief of Staff of Fifth Army in Ft. Sam Houston, Texas, for "making statements disloyal to the United States."

Usually featured each week in the Iconoclast is a cover story (an interview). The contents include national, state, and local news stories, plus a wide variety of opinion columns by writers from throughout the country, plus a staff-written editorial on a current topic.
