= Greene Correctional Facility =

State prison for men located in New York, US

Coordinates: 42°20′48″N 73°49′21″W

- Interactive map of Greene Correctional Facility
- Location: 165 Plank Road Coxsackie, New York
- Status: open
- Security class: medium / maximum
- Capacity: 1813
- Opened: 1984
- Managed by: New York State Department of Corrections and Community Supervision

The Greene Correctional Facility is a state prison for men located in Coxsackie, Greene County, New York, owned and operated by the New York State Department of Corrections and Community Supervision.

The facility opened in 1989 and holds 1582 inmates at medium security, which includes 171 held in a maximum security unit. Greene is adjacent to the state's Coxsackie Correctional Facility, originally built in 1935. Several incarcerated individuals have been killed by other inmates while in custody at this facility. Inmates at this facility are also responsible for numerous assaults on staff. Additionally, it was revealed that in 2016, prison guards instigated an attack on an inmate and covered it up.
