= Zainab Al-Suwaij =

Iraqi American activist and the co-founder of the American Islamic Congress (born 1971)

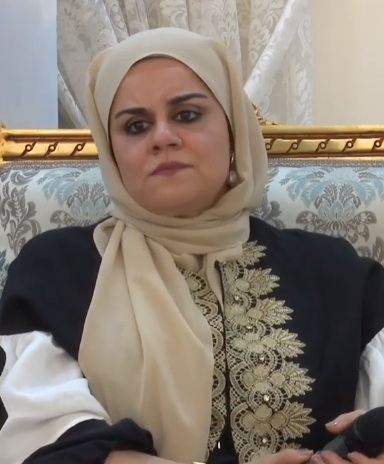
- Al-Suwaij at Kuwait Society For National Fraternity, 27 June 2019
- Born: 1971 (age 54–55); Basra
- Occupations: activist and writer

Zainab Al-Suwaij (Arabic: زينب السويج) (b. 1971) is an Iraqi American activist and the co-founder and executive director of the American Islamic Congress. She advocates for women's equality, civil and religious rights, and interfaith understanding.

== Biography ==
Suwaij was born in Basra in 1971 and was raised in the home of her grandfather, the Ayatollah of Basra. In 1991, she participated in the guerilla uprising against Sadam Hussein. Shortly after the uprising she fled Iraq and came to the United States. She became a United States citizen in 1996.

== Career ==
After arriving in the United States, Suwaij taught Arabic at Yale University and worked resettling Sudanese refugees in the United States. In 2001, following the terrorist attacks of September 11, she co-founded the American Islamic Congress to "represent those American Muslims who cherished the freedoms of the U.S. after living under repressive regimes." Suwaij was a prominent public supporter of the 2003 U.S. war with Iraq. She spoke at the 2004 Republican National Convention, restating her support for the United States' 2003 invasion of Iraq.

Suwaij has served as AIC's Executive Director since its inception. Under her leadership, the Muslim organization has trained young Middle Eastern activists in the methods of non-violent protest and social media mobilization, empowering them to challenge regimes during the Arab Spring. Suwaij frequently speaks at universities, think tanks and panel events. She has testified before Congress and briefed the White House and the State Department. Her writings have been published in New York Times, The Wall Street Journal, USA Today and others.

== Recognition ==
Suwaij was named an "Ambassador of Peace" by the Interreligious and International Peace Council, received a Dialogue on Diversity's Liberty Award in 2006 and was recognized as "2006 International Person of the Year" by the National Liberty Museum.

In 2012, Suwaij received the East West Vision of Peace Award from the Levantine Cultural Center for her work to bridge political and religious divides between the United States and the Middle East and North Africa.
