= David Gurevich =

American writer

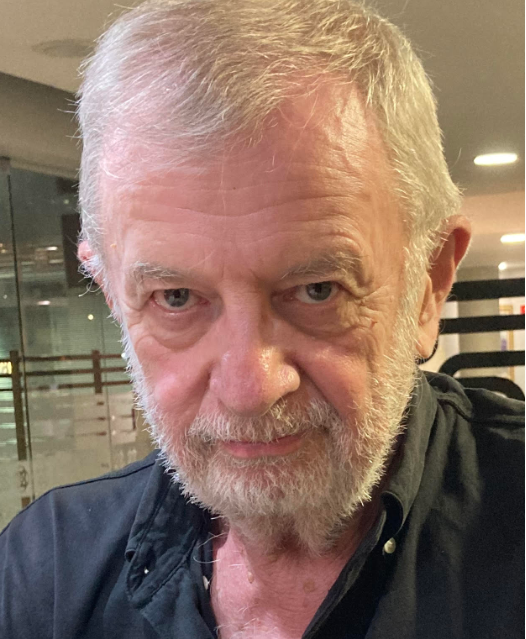
david gurevich writer

David Gurevich is an American writer of Russian origin.

== Early life ==
David Gurevich was born as Vyacheslav Gurevich in Kharkov, Ukraine, in 1951. His father was an Air Force pilot and his mother a doctor. He was one of a few Jewish students on the Interpreter department of the Moscow Institute of Foreign Languages (now Moscow Linguistic University). In 1976, he immigrated to the US, working as a writer, book and film critic, and essayist.

== Career ==
In 1987, his first novel, Travels with Dubinsky and Clive, was published by Viking Press. The memoir From Lenin to Lennon, and another novel, Vodka for Breakfast, followed.

Gurevich was the producer of the TV documentary Empty Rooms (directed by Dutch director Willy Lindwer) about the 2001 Dolphinarium massacre in Tel Aviv.

== Bibliography ==
- Gurewich, David (1987). Travels with Dubinsky and Clive. New York: Viking. ISBN 0-670-81621-3.
- Gurevich, David (1991). From Lenin to Lennon. San Diego: Harcourt Brace Jovanovich. ISBN 0-15-149825-3.
- Gurevich, David (2003). Vodka for Breakfast. New York: ENC Press. ISBN 0-9728321-2-2.
- Gurevich, David (2016). Young Spies in Love: A Novel of Tradecraft. New York: david gurevich books. ISBN 9780997701517.
