= Ahmed Bedier (activist) =

American activist

Ahmed Bedier is a Florida-based community organizer, speaker and media commentator, who is recognized as an expert on Islamic issues. He has been asked to present commentary or participate as a panelist on CNN, Fox News Channel, NBC and MSNBC. USA Today, The New York Times, The Washington Post, The New York Sun and Time magazine have carried articles about him and by him.

Bedier is the president of United Voices for America, an organization that promotes civic engagement and democracy. He is the president of the Human Rights Council of Tampa Bay, Florida, and serves on the state board of the American Civil Liberties Union (ACLU) of Florida. He co-hosts True Talk on the Tampa NPR affiliate and community station WMNF 88.5 FM. The live radio program views global events from a Muslim perspective.

== Early years ==
Bedier came to America at the age of eight when his father, an economist and statistician from Cairo, moved his family to the United States. When his parents returned to Egypt, Bedier chose to remain in the United States. From a start as an IT network administrator, he went on to become an operations manager for a dental group and eventually opened his own dental laboratory in St. Petersburg, Fla.

== Early involvement in civil liberties ==
Ahmed Bedier's involvement in civil liberties began after the September 11 attacks in 2001. The St. Petersburg Times called his mosque for a response to the attack. Bedier shared his views on what it felt like to be a young Muslim in America after 9/11. This led to volunteer work with the Council on American-Islamic Relations (CAIR) in public relations. In December 2003, when CAIR opened a Tampa office, Bedier became the director.

Bedier's involvement in advocating for justice, civil rights and understanding began in earnest after Seminole, Florida podiatrist Robert Goldstein was taken into custody in August 2002. A list of 50 Islamic centers (including the mosque Bedier attended), detailed plans of an “Islamic Education Center”, 20 illegal bombs were found in Goldstein's town home, and a three-page document called the “Mission Template” with the objective to “Kill all 'rags' at this Islamic Education Center." While Florida's Muslim community was grateful he was caught before he had detonated one of his bombs, the incident created a great deal of fear.

== Civil rights involvement ==
Bedier has been at the forefront of raising awareness of racial profiling. Only the most notable cases are referenced here.

A Jacksonville bus driver refused to allow 20 middle school students of Middle Eastern and Asian descent to remain on a Duval County school bus on October 29, 2003. The students had to walk 5 miles home. A second bus driver refused to allow Muslim students to board the bus on October 31, 2003. Ahmed Bedier spoke out against the incident.

In 2004, 44 anti-Muslim incidents were reported to CAIR. In 2005, the number had risen. One of the anti-Muslim incidents that stands out for the year involved Larbi Tizaoui. On November 11, 2005, on his way home from work at 2:00 a.m., the American Muslim was denied service at a Subway. He was told that the store was closed, but his Caucasian wife was served a short while later. Because a uniformed police officer helped the Subway manager escort Tizaoui off the premises, Bedier filed a complaint on behalf of CAIR with the internal affairs office of the Tampa Police Department. Suit was also brought against the Subway store. The amount of the settlement was not disclosed.

As a result of his public appearances on behalf of similar cases, Bedier has become one of the most visible Muslim faces on television. He has appeared on ABC, CNN, Fox News Channel, NBC and MSNBC affiliates as a subject matter expert. His appearances have ranged from conservative talk show host Glenn Beck to Progressive leftist Amy Goodman and everything in between.

In 2004 Tampa NPR affiliate and community station WMNF 88.5 FM decided to include a trial program that addressed Muslim issues. True Talk's success exceeded expectations and became a permanent part of Friday's programming in 2005. Bedier co-produces and co-hosts the program with Samar Jarrah. Guests include religious figures, politicians, community leaders and journalists.

Bedier became involved in the American Civil Liberties Union (ACLU) of Florida in 2005 and the Human Rights Council of Tampa in 2004.

Bedier has been very active in helping the Muslim community learn how to work with law enforcement to reduce the risk of home-grown terrorism. After the UK airline plot was foiled in 2006, Bedier organized a meeting between law enforcement chiefs from 20 different agencies, both local and federal. The purpose of the meeting was to learn what to look for and how to work with law enforcement so that suspicious activities are reported effectively.

He has been quoted in the press, saying, "No one wants to attack their own people. Muslims here see themselves as Americans more than Muslims in France see themselves as French."

== United Voices for America ==
In 2008, Bedier founded United Voices for America (UVA), a non-profit, non-partisan civic organization dedicated to increasing minority participation in America's political process. One of the first efforts of the new organization was the organization of candidate and issue forums. These large public events brought minority constituents into contact with candidates during the 2008 election year. These forums provided a venue where issues could be identified first hand and voters could reach informed decisions regarding the candidates. Organizing issue forums where elected officials and decision makers can discuss concerns remains an important strategy of United Voices.

On March 10, 2009, United Voices launched the first Florida Muslim Capitol Day, with the intent to make this an annual event. The event was designed to introduce Muslims to Florida's political process and give them a chance to lobby on issues including education and healthcare reform. March 11, 2010 marked the second Florida Muslim Capital Day.

In the summer of 2009, Bedier launched Capitol Leadership Academy, a summer intensive program designed to train young minorities in civic action, public affairs and political participation. The goal is to give young people the tools to take peaceful civic action, engage directly with policy makers and learn the skills of networking.

== Other community involvement ==
Bedier has worked actively to promote community services—a primary value of Islam. This has been demonstrated through his active organization of Muslim physicians and coordinating the opening of free healthcare clinics for uninsured poor-income families.

When seven churches in the Middle East were vandalized after Pope Benedict made comments in a speech that angered some Muslims around the world, Bedier organized a regional fundraising campaign to help repair the damage. He pitched in the first $5,000 and asked others to help. The money was given to a Catholic charity that repaired the damage. He speaks openly with clergy of many Christian and Jewish denominations, recognizing that there are many misconceptions as to what Islam teaches.

== Response to events in Egypt ==
When the revolt in Egypt erupted, Bedier organized a rally for January 29, 2011 at the busy intersection of Tampa's Dale Mabry Highway and Kennedy Boulevard. About 150 area Muslims joined the effort to increase awareness of the issues. When interviewed by the Tampa Bay St. Petersburg Times at the rally, Bedier stated that Egypt has been simmering for years. He predicts, "You will be able to read in any history book how the youth of Egypt used technology, Twitter and Facebook and overthrew the regime with a peaceful movement." Bedier stated that the purpose of the rally was to send a clear message to the people of Egypt that Egyptians living in America stand in solidarity with them and their demand for freedom.

== Controversy ==
During his time with CAIR, Bedier spoke out for Muslim rights not only in the United States, but also on a worldwide scale. This has sparked some criticism, backlash and threats. His critics say that Bedier does not speak out harshly enough against Palestinian groups and claim that his support of a Palestinian state that coexists with Israel proves that he's sympathetic with extremists who have an agenda against Israel, a claim Bedier denies.

Many members of the Jewish community have not found this accusation supported. He has been a leading contributor to positive relations between American Muslims and Jews. They find that he holds a moderate position. He has spoken out against Iran’s denial of the Holocaust. He spoke against the removal of Christian and Jewish holidays from the Florida school calendar. He has organized events where common beliefs between the two groups are discussed and enjoyed together. Bedier consistently speaks out against all forms of terrorism and violence against civilians.

In 2007, when two University of South Florida students were arrested on explosives charges in South Carolina, Bedier was at the forefront of calling for a fair trial and due process. Bedier knew one of the students, Youssef Megahed, casually. For some of his critics, this is proof that he is a terrorist in sheep’s clothing. When the facts are reviewed, they reveal that Bedier had no connections with the man who was convicted, and the man he knew casually was found innocent on all charges. In an interview with the Tampa Tribune, Bedier stated that the video produced by Ahmed Mohamed showing how to make a remote detonator was unacceptable. Mohamed "was sent here on a scholarship to do a doctorate in engineering and not to make videos, and now he's going to pay the price for that."

Some critics point to a 2009 statement made at the Florida State Capitol as evidence he is stirring up Muslims to intimidate the government. Supporters of Bedier say that critics are taking words out of context. In his speech, Bedier quoted a statement attributed to Thomas Jefferson. "When governments fear the people, there is liberty. When the people fear the government, there is tyranny." His remaining speech encouraged the Muslims and other minorities present, to be actively involved in the political process so they would not have to fear the government, but the government would have to fear them.

Bedier has spoken out against the use of violence to accomplish social change, but there are some groups that feel that his previous connection with CAIR demonstrates that he supports another ideology entirely. CAIR has been cleared by the State Department of any terrorist connections, but this has not prevented the organization from remaining under suspicion by some conservative and pro-Israeli/anti-Muslim groups, and Bedier remaining a key target of attack by extension. An internet search will confirm this.

Pro-Israel groups have regularly accused Bedier of being the spokesman for Dr. Sami Al-Arian, a former University of South Florida Professor who was indicted on terrorism related charges. In December 2005, a Florida federal jury acquitted Al-Arian on the eight of seventeen charges he faced and deadlocked on the remainder. Al-Arian later settled the remaining charges by pleading guilty to one count of non-violent material support. Bedier says he never met or spoke to Dr. Al-Arian and did not know of Al-Arian before his arrest.

== Opinions regarding Ahmed Bedier ==
Carl Whitehead, the special agent in charge of Federal Bureau of Investigation (FBI) Tampa praises Bedier's efforts to ensure civil liberties. He has spoken publicly claiming the FBI appreciates Bedier's work “in the community in the area of civil rights.” He also has expressed his appreciation that Bedier has worked to “establish open forums for us to exchange information in order to keep the nation safe.

Tampa TV anchor John Wilson spoke about Ahmed Bedier’s work in the Tampa Bay area on November 20, 2007 during an opinion piece known as “My Talk”. Wilson expresses his appreciation of Bedier's efforts to prevent the development of terrorist cell groups on American soil.
