= American Islamic Congress =

- Established: November 2001; 25 years ago
- Founder: Zainab Al-Suwaij, others
- Type: 501(c)(3) non-profit organization
- Location: Washington, DC, United States
- Executive Director: Zainab Al-Suwaij
- Board of directors: Harriet Fulbright; Sa'ad Eddin Ibrahim; Khaleel Mohammed
- Website: aicongress.org

Founded late in 2001, the American Islamic Congress (AIC) is a 501(c)(3) non-profit organization based in the United States. AIC is a non-religious, civil rights organization whose stated goal is to build interfaith and inter-ethnic understanding. It receives significant funding from the U.S. government.

== History ==
AIC was founded in November 2001 by a group of American Muslims to promote tolerance following the September 11, 2001 attacks. AIC's co-founder, Zainab Al-Suwaij, was a prominent public supporter of the 2003 U.S. war with Iraq. In 2004, AIC was one of three groups who shared a $10 million U.S. Department of State grant to carry out democracy training of Iraqi women.

The organization is based in Washington, D.C. and also maintains bureaus in Boston, Massachusetts, Cairo, Egypt and Basra, Iraq. AIC co-founder Al-Suwaij is the group's Executive Director.

== U.S. Programs ==
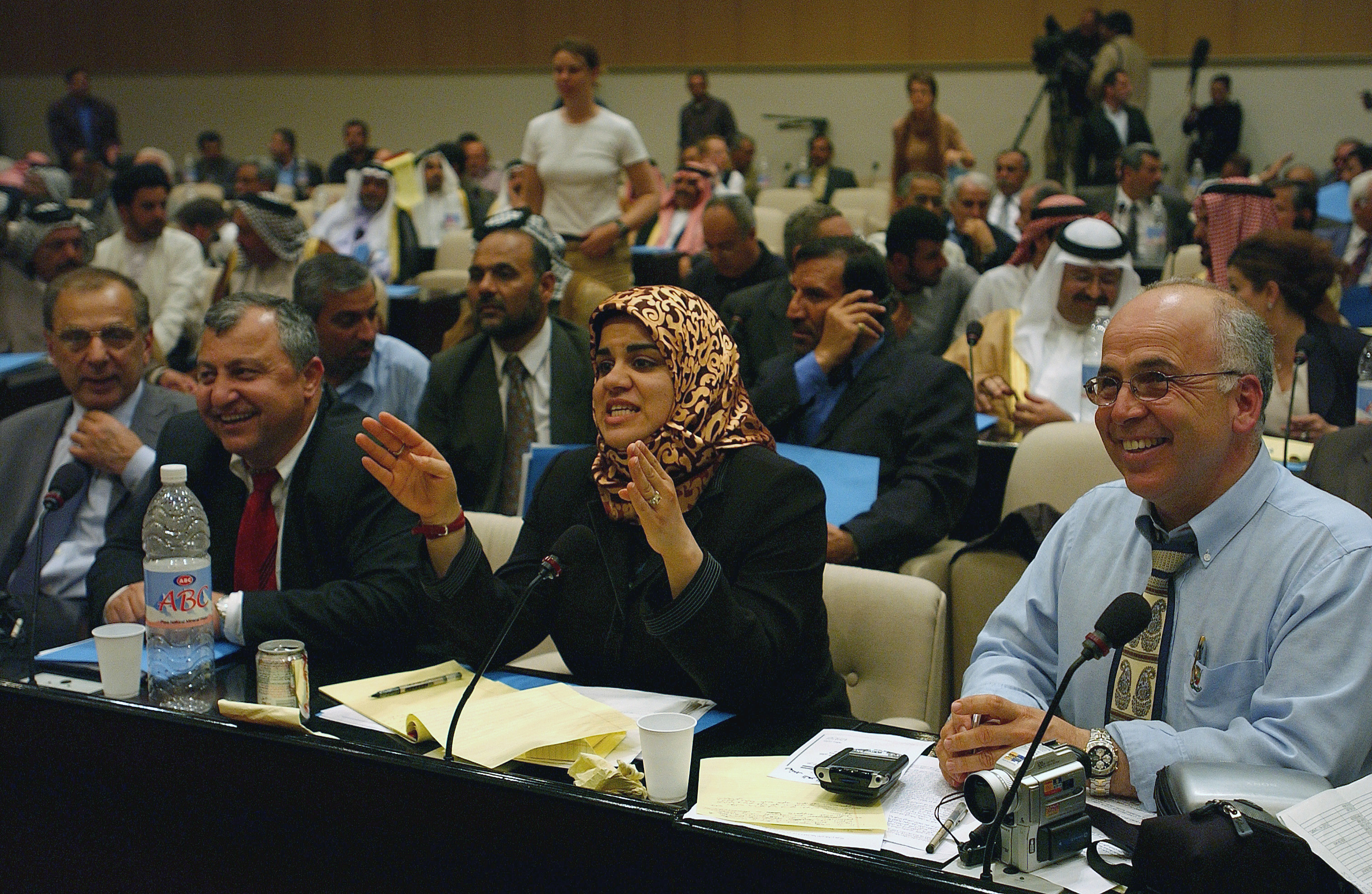
Zainab Al-Suwaij speaks at the Iraqi Interim Authority Conference in Baghdad, April 2003

In 2010, the American Islamic Congress started a student-led initiative dubbed "Project Nur," which has over 70 chapters on campuses across the nation. The chapters work to combat stereotypes and promote inter-faith understanding on college campuses. Project Nur, in cooperation with the John Templeton Foundation, hosts the Science and Islam dialogue series, which explores the intersection of Muslim faith and science.

AIC's Boston Center, located on Newbury Street in Boston, Massachusetts, organizes interfaith activities, serves as a resource for other non-profits and hosts cultural events, such as concerts, art exhibitions and film screenings, as well as human and civil rights panel discussions.

AIC's D.C. Center focuses on advocacy, engagement and education, serving as the base for AIC's government and NGO relations. AIC represents the American Muslim constituency on Capitol Hill and supports legislation that promotes international religious and civil freedoms. In 2011, AIC was a critical voice campaigning for the re-authorization of the United States Commission on International Religious Freedom. A significant part of the AIC's push for reauthorization included a media campaign, spearheaded by John T. Pinna, the Director of Government & International Relations at the time. Pinna and the AIC sent out a "pitch" about the bill to over 30 publications. The campaign gained traction with a story running in the Washington Post and TIME magazine contacting Senate offices about the USCIRF bill. Within 24 hours after those calls, Senator Richard Durbin proposed amendments, the "call back" was rescinded and the bill quickly passed the Senate by unanimous consent.

== International Programs ==
In Egypt, AIC hosts the Cairo Human Rights Film Festival and conducts a civic education prohectm Fahem Haqi (I Know My Rights). AIC has also translated and distributed "The Montgomery Story," a Martin Luther King comic book that describes the 1958 bus boycott and the power of non-violence. The comic book was influential during the events of the Arab Spring.

In 2008, AIC, in collaboration with CureViolence, began the Ambassadors for Peace program in Iraq. The program aims to peacefully resolve conflicts through the mediation of local outreach workers.

In June 2010, AIC launched a blog focusing on women's right in the Middle East. The blog, called "Drafting a New Story: Women's Rights in the Middle East" features new stories, political cartoons, video interviews, and artwork with an emphasis on women's rights.

AIC began working in Tunisia in 2011 with the social entrepreneurship program Tune in Tunisia. The program offers young social entrepreneurs microgrants to lead civil society projects in their local communities.

AIC also holds an annual essay writing contest focused on civil rights in the Middle East, the Dream Deferred Essay Contest. In May 2012, the best essay submissions from the Middle East and North Africa were published in an anthology called Arab Spring Dreams.

AIC advocates for religious and civil freedoms at large in the Middle East. In 2007, when Haleh Esfandiari was imprisoned in Evin Prison in Iran, the American Islamic Congress created the site freehaleh.org to petition for her release.

== Funding ==
From its early days, the AIC has received a significant portion of its funding from the U.S. government.
