= Tawfik Hamid =

Egyptian author

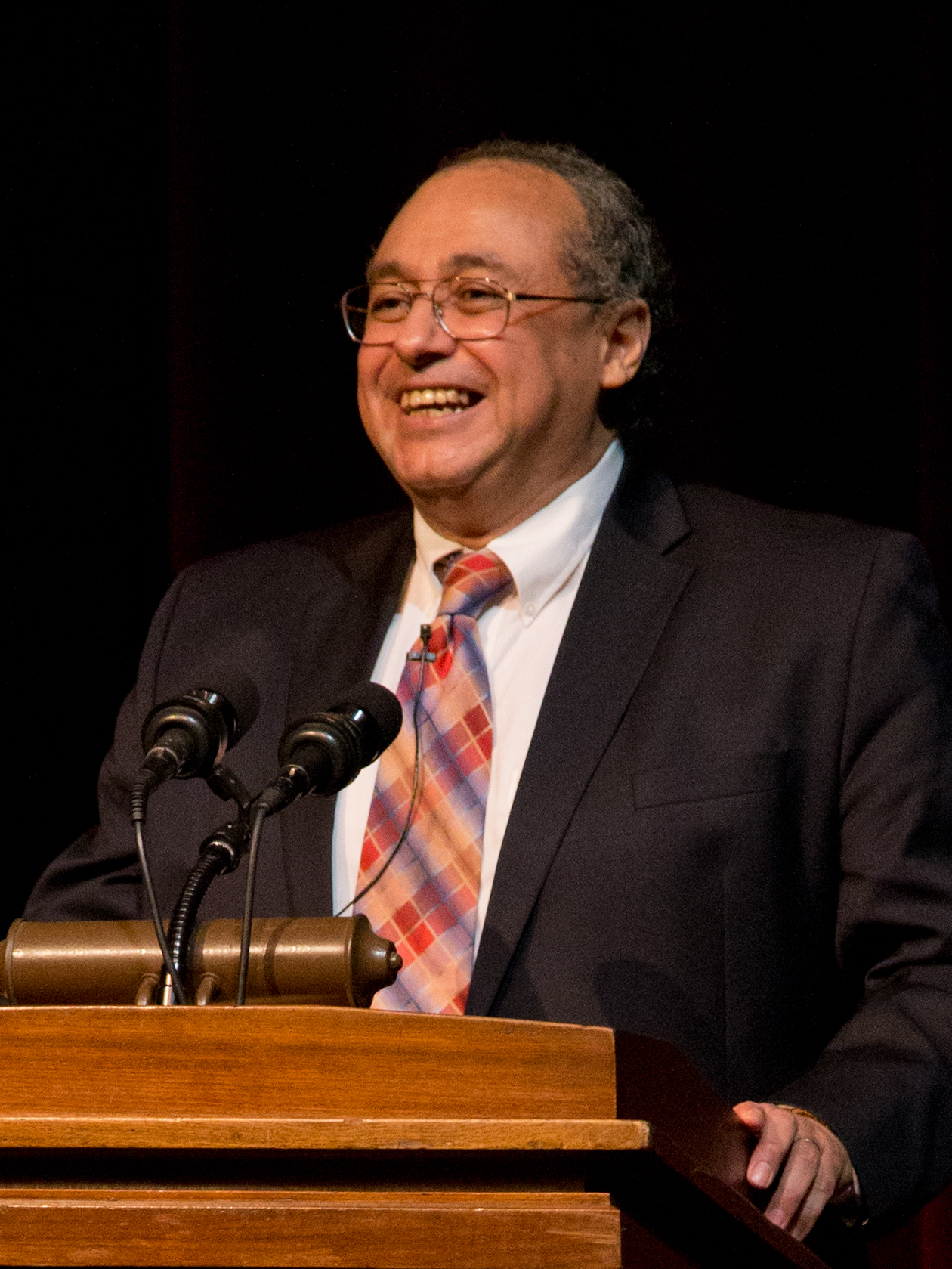
- Hamid in 2017
- Born: 1961 (age 64–65); Egypt
- Education: Cairo University (MD); University of Auckland
- Known for: Muslim reformer

Tawfik Hamid (Arabic: توفيق حامد; born 1961) is an Egyptian-American Muslim reformer and medical doctor. A self-described former member of the militant group al-Jama'a al-Islamiyya, he says that he started to preach in mosques to promote his message and, as a result, became a target of Islamic militants, who threatened his life. He has been a Senior Fellow and Chair for the Study of Islamic Radicalism at the Potomac Institute for Policy Studies.

== Background ==
Hamid was born in Egypt in a secular Muslim family, but later joined al-Jama'a al-Islamiyya under Ayman al-Zawahiri, later leader of al-Qaeda. He left the group after he was asked to kidnap and bury alive an Egyptian policeman, which he refused to do.

Hamid, also known as Tarek Abdelhamid, states to have received a medical degree in internal medicine from the Cairo University, and a master's degree in cognitive psychology and educational techniques from the University of Auckland.

He fled Egypt, first to Saudi Arabia and then to the United States. He was a speaker at The Intelligence Summit in 2007.

== Views on Islam ==
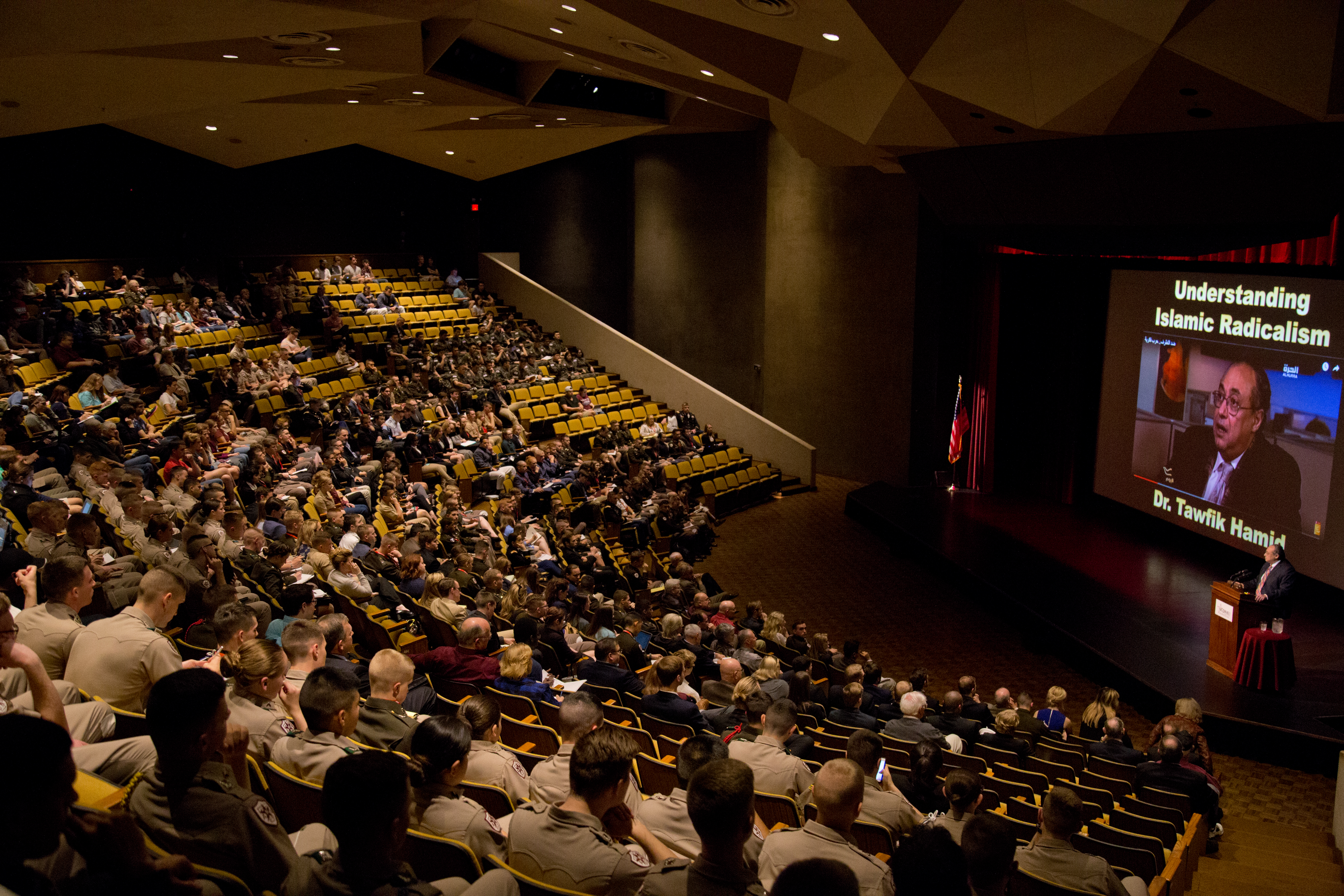
Hamid in a lecture at the Memorial Student Center Texas A&M University in 2017

Hamid rejects the view that Muslim fundamentalists are driven by poverty, saying that most he knew were middle-class university students like himself. He says that Muslim fundamentalists believe that Saudi Arabia's petroleum-based wealth is a divine gift and that Saudi influence is sanctioned by Allah. Thus, the Salafist extreme brand of Sunni Islam that spread from the Saudi Arabia to the rest of the Islamic world is regarded not merely as one interpretation of the religion but as the only genuine interpretation. The expansion of violent and regressive Islam, he continues, began in the late 1970s and can be traced precisely to the growing financial clout of Saudi Arabia.

He has defended Dutch politician Geert Wilders and his film Fitna, and said that Islam should prove its peacefulness and called Islamic scholars and clerics "to produce a Shariah book that will be accepted in the Islamic world and that teaches that Jews are not pigs and monkeys, that declaring war to spread Islam is unacceptable, and that killing apostates is a crime."

He vocally opposed the construction of the Park51 mosque and Islamic center at Ground Zero. In a policy paper for the Air Force Research Laboratory, he has suggested that the wearing of the hijab is a form of "passive terrorism", and he has supported proposals for the United States to designate the Muslim Brotherhood as a terrorist organization. He is a Muslim supporter of Israel.

Chris Bail, an assistant professor of sociology at Duke University, has criticized Hamid for his ties to anti-Muslim organizations. Due to Hamid's active support for Frank Gaffney, Tom Griffin of openDemocracy has supported Hope not Hate's designation of Hamid as a counter-jihad activist.

== Bibliography ==
- The Roots of Jihad: An Insider's View of Islamic Violence. Top Executive Media. 2005. ISBN 978-0977102129.
- Inside Jihad: Understanding and Confronting Radical Islam. T. Hamid. 2008. ISBN 978-0981547107.
- Inside Jihad: How Radical Islam Works, Why It Should Terrify Us, How to Defeat It. Mountain Lake Press. 2015. ISBN 978-0990808916.
