= Irshad Manji =

Canadian educator (born 1968)

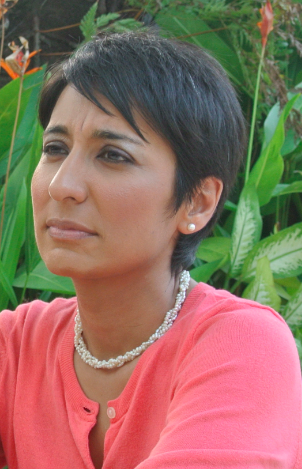
- Manji in 2012
- Born: 1968 (age 57–58) near Kampala, Uganda
- Education: University of British Columbia (BA)
- Occupations: Educator, author and founder of the Moral Courage Project
- Years active: 1990–present
- Spouse: Laura Albano (m. 2016; div. 2020)
- Awards: Honorary Doctorate, University of Puget Sound; Honorary Doctorate, Bishop's University; Young Global Leader, World Economic Forum; Ethical Humanist Award, New York Society for Ethical Culture
- Website: irshadmanji.com

Irshad Manji (born 1968) is a Ugandan-born Canadian-American author and educator on leadership. Her 2019 book, Don't Label Me, proposes methods for healing political, racial, and cultural divides. The ideas in the book are related to the Moral Courage Project, which Manji founded at New York University in 2008 and expanded to the University of Southern California (USC) in 2016, when she was a senior fellow at the Annenberg Center on Communication Leadership & Policy. After leaving USC, she founded Moral Courage College with the mission of educating on how to engage polarizing issues instead of "shaming or canceling each other". Manji lectures on these themes as a senior research fellow with the Oxford Initiative for Global Ethics and Human Rights.

She is the author of The Trouble with Islam Today (2004) and Allah, Liberty and Love (2011), both of which have been banned in several Muslim countries. A former journalist and television presenter, she also produced a PBS documentary in the America at a Crossroads series, titled Faith Without Fear, which was nominated for an Emmy Award in 2008.

== Early life and education ==
Manji was born in 1968 near Kampala, Uganda. Her mother is of Egyptian descent and her father of Indian heritage.

When Idi Amin ordered the expulsion of Asians and other non-Africans from Uganda in the early 1970s, Manji and her family came to Canada as refugees when she was four years old. They settled in Richmond, British Columbia, near Vancouver. Manji attended secular public schools and, every Saturday, a religious school (madrasa). Manji says that, at 14 years old, she was expelled from the madrasa for asking too many questions.

In 1990, Manji earned a bachelor's degree with honours in the history of ideas from the University of British Columbia, and won the Governor General's Academic Medal for top humanities graduate. In 2002, Manji became writer-in-residence at the University of Toronto's Hart House, from where she began writing The Trouble with Islam Today. She was a visiting fellow with the International Security Studies program at Yale University in 2006 and was a senior fellow with the Brussels-based European Foundation for Democracy from 2006 to 2012.

== Career ==
Manji began her career working in politics in the 1990s. She was a legislative aide in the Canadian parliament for New Democratic Party member of parliament Dawn Black, then press secretary in the Ontario government for Ontario New Democratic Party cabinet minister Marion Boyd, and later speechwriter for federal NDP leader Audrey McLaughlin. At the age of 24, she became the national affairs editorialist for the Ottawa Citizen and the youngest member of an editorial board for any Canadian daily. She was also a columnist for Ottawa's new LGBT newspaper Capital Xtra! She participated in a regular "Friendly Fire" segment on TVOntario's Studio 2 from 1992 to 1994, head-to-head against right-wing writer Michael Coren.

Manji hosted and produced several public affairs programs on television, including Q-Files for Pulse24 and its successor QT: QueerTelevision for the Toronto-based Citytv in the late 1990s. When she left the show, Manji donated the television set's "big Q" to the Pride Library at the University of Western Ontario.

She has also appeared on television networks around the world, including Al Jazeera, the CBC, BBC, MSNBC, C-SPAN, CNN, PBS, the Fox News Channel, CBS, and HBO.

She was also a visiting professor at New York University (NYU) from 2008 to 2015. Manji joined NYU's Robert F. Wagner Graduate School of Public Service to create the Moral Courage Project, an initiative to teach young people how to speak truth to power within their own communities. Her courses focused on how "to make values-driven decisions for the sake of their integrity – professional and personal". In April 2013, Moral Courage TV (on YouTube), was launched by Manji and Cornel West, a professor and activist. West spoke of Manji's work as a "powerful force for good." In 2015, Manji developed "the West Coast presence of Moral Courage" at the Annenberg Center on Communication Leadership & Policy of the University of Southern California.

== Works ==
=== The Trouble with Islam Today ===
Manji's book The Trouble with Islam Today (originally titled The Trouble with Islam) was published by St. Martin's Press in 2004. The book was first released in Canada under the previous title in September 2003. It has since been translated into more than 30 languages. Manji offered Arabic, Persian, and Urdu translations of the book available for free-of-charge download on her website. In The Trouble with Islam Today, Manji investigates new interpretations of the Qur'an which she believes are more fitting for the 21st century. The book has been met with both praise and scorn from both Muslim and non-Muslim sources. Several reviewers have called the book "courageous" or "long overdue" while others have said it disproportionately targets Muslims.

Tarek Fatah, a fellow Canadian Muslim who originally criticized The Trouble With Islam, reversed his stance, saying that Manji was "right about the systematic racism in the Muslim world" and that "there were many redeeming points in her memoir".

The Trouble with Islam Today is banned in many countries in the Middle East. Since July 2009, the book has also been outlawed in Malaysia.

=== Faith without Fear ===
In 2007 Manji released a PBS documentary, Faith without Fear. It follows her journey to reconcile faith and freedom, depicting the personal risks she has faced as a Muslim reformer. She explores Islamism in Yemen, Europe and North America, as well as histories of Islamic critical thinking in Spain and elsewhere. Faith Without Fear was nominated for an Emmy and was a finalist for the National Film Board of Canada's Gemini Award. It launched the 2008 Muslim Film Festival, organized by the American Islamic Congress and won Gold at the New York Television Festival.

=== Allah, Liberty and Love ===
It is time for those who love liberal democracy to join hands with Islam's reformists. Here is a clue to who's who: Moderate Muslims denounce violence committed in the name of Islam but insist that religion has nothing to do with it; reformist Muslims, by contrast, not only deplore Islamist violence but admit that our religion is used to incite it.

— Manji in The Wall Street Journal, May 7, 2011

In 2011, Manji published Allah, Liberty and Love. In the book, she examines how Muslims can reinterpret the Qur'an, speak more freely, and think more independently. To support her approach, Manji cites ijtihad, the Islamic tradition of critical thinking in the interpretation of Islamic texts and doctrines. Manji asserts that any change of lasting value to Muslims can only come from within and cannot be imposed from external sources.

Manji agrees to and promotes the validity of interfaith marriages of Muslims to non-Muslims, specially of Muslim women to non-Muslim men, based on ideas of Khaleel Mohammed of San Diego State University (SDSU), in San Diego, California.

As with Manji's other writings, Allah, Liberty and Love generated both positive and negative responses. Rayyan Al Shawaf, a Beirut-based writer and book critic, laments Manji's focus on how the Qur'an can be reinterpreted by liberal Muslims and not on how legal limits can be set to curb the Qur'an's influence. He also argues that Manji promotes ijtihad while overlooking that "ijtihad is a sword that cuts both ways." Al-Shawaf also laments Manji's focus "on how liberal Muslims could reinterpret the Koran as opposed to how they might set legal limits on its socio-politico-economic influence." Melik Kaylan in his review for Newsweek describes the book as "a rallying cry to Muslims" and full of "snappy phrases that hover between epigrams and slogans—effective soundbites for her supporters."

Omar Sultan Haque, a researcher and teacher at Harvard University Medical School, argues that although Manji's book is important in raising consciousness, it "fails to grapple with some of the more substantial questions that would make [a liberal and open] future [of Islamic Interpretation] a reality." Haque often describes Manji's ideas in a "patronizing manner". Howard A. Doughty, a professor of political economy at Seneca College, illustrates this with a quote from Haque's review: "Manji's God resembles an extremely affectionate and powerful high school guidance counselor."

Doughty, in summarizing his observations of Manji's critics says that some scholars (excluding himself) argue that "Manji may lack the gravitas to drive home her points and turn her ideas into action." He instead offers a defense of her approach and argues that "what her critics seem to miss is that her ease of communication, stripped of abstract philosophical, political and economic analysis, is precisely what allows her to turn her thoughts into other people's actions."

The international launch of Allah, Liberty and Love was met with controversy. In December 2011, Muslim extremists stormed Manji's book launch in Amsterdam; twenty-two Muslim men rushed into the venue and attempted to assault her. During Manji's book tour, police cut short her talk in Jakarta due to pressure from one of Indonesia's fundamentalist groups, the Islamic Defenders Front. A few days later, hundreds of men from the Indonesian Mujahedeen Council assaulted Manji's team and her supporters in Yogyakarta. Several people were injured and at least one had to be treated in a hospital. Shortly afterwards, the government of Malaysia banned Allah, Liberty and Love. But in September 2013, a High Court in Kuala Lumpur struck down the ban. The previous year, Nik Raina Nik Abdul Aziz, a Malay woman who was one of the managers of a Borders, was arrested for selling a translation of Manji's book before the state had announced its ban. After her three-year legal battle with the authorities, Malaysia's Federal Court ruled in her favour and dismissed the government's bid to appeal.

=== Don't Label Me ===
In a pre-release event for her latest book, Don't Label Me: An Incredible Conversation for Divided Times, Manji was the keynote speaker at the annual Day of Discovery, Dialogue & Action event of the Washington University in St. Louis on 19 February 2019. Don't Label Me was published by St. Martin's Press on 26 February. The book is written in the form of an imaginary conversation with Lily, Manji's first dog, who is now deceased and plays the role of Devil's advocate. According to Dana Gee of the Vancouver Sun, "It may seem like a gimmicky construct, but it actually works". Manji uses the conversation to advocate rising above tribalism and engaging in a discourse with those with whom the reader disagrees. In a video published by Time magazine in March 2019, Manji says "I'm here to propose that, while more and more schools are teaching young people how not to be offensive, they also need to be teaching a new generation how not to be offended". Comedian Chris Rock, a fan of Manji, also promoted the book on Twitter calling it "genius". In a review of Don't Label Me for Areo Magazine, Samuel Kronen wrote that "Manji provides a wonderful combination of self-deprecation, wit and ferocious honesty and provides insights into some of the greatest social problems we face today."

== Views ==
Manji has received numerous death threats because of her views. While living in Toronto, she had the windows of her home fitted with bullet-proof glass for security. Manji has been described as a Quranist.

In an interview with The Jerusalem Post, describing her political leanings, Manji said, "I'm not left-wing, I'm not right-wing. I'm post-wing". She has criticized the argument that US wars inspire Islamic extremism. Manji initially supported the United States' wars in Iraq and Afghanistan, and the George W. Bush administration's war on terror. By 2006, her views toward the war in Iraq had become highly critical of the Bush government. On Iraq, she said she "thought the Oval Office had information that was taken into account when it made decisions." She also said, "I have been openly questioning our work in Afghanistan and the implications of it."

She argues that Palestinians face two occupations: one imposed by Hamas on women and LGBT people and the other by the Israeli forces in all of Palestine.

== Personal life ==
In 2016, Manji and her partner, Laura Albano, were married in Hawaii. They lived there with their rescue dogs. The couple are now divorced.

== Awards and honours ==
- 1997 – Feminist for the 21st Century named by Ms. Magazine
- 2004 – Oprah Winfrey's inaugural Chutzpah Award for "audacity, nerve, boldness and conviction"
- 2005 – Named by The Jakarta Post as one of three women making a positive change in Islam today.
- 2006 – Young Global Leader selected by the World Economic Forum
- 2007 – Global Vision Prize, Immigration Equality's highest honour
- 2008 – Honorary Doctorate University of Puget Sound
- 2009 – Muslim Leader of Tomorrow from the American Society for Muslim Advancement
- 2012 – The Ethical Humanist Award from New York Society for Ethical Culture's highest honour
- 2014 – Honorary Doctorate Bishop's University
- 2015 – Lantos Human Rights Prize

== Bibliography ==
- 1997 – Risking Utopia: On the Edge of a New Democracy, (Douglas and McIntyre ISBN 1-55054-434-9)
- 2003 – The Trouble with Islam Today (St. Martin's Press, ISBN 9780312326999)
- 2011 – Allah, Liberty and Love: The Courage to Reconcile Faith and Freedom (Atria Books, ISBN 1-4516-4520-1, ISBN 978-1-4516-4520-0)
- 2019 – Don't Label Me: An Incredible Conversation for Divided Times (St. Martin's Press, ISBN 9781250157980)
