= Zari Kovo =

Israeli businessman

Zari David (Bebo) Kovo
- בבו קובו
- Born: Eliezer Kovo
- Occupation: Businessman
- Known for: Camden Town, Stables Market
- Spouses: Ruth Braha (m. 1973; div. 2006) Miri Bohadana (m. 2008)
- Children: 6, including Oded David Kobo

Zari David "Bebo" Kovo (Hebrew: בבו קובו) is an Israeli-Bulgarian property developer. He was one of the partners of property company Camden Market Holdings & Developments.

== Career ==
In the 1970s, Kobo was based in Hong Kong, as a clothing manufacturer, working closely with the Nakash Group, who owned the fashion brand Jordache.

In the 1990s, Kobo alongside Richard Caring, and Elliott Bernerd, head of the British property company Chelsfield, teamed up to acquire London's Camden Market as well other properties in Camden Town. In 2014, they sold "a huge swathe" to fellow Israeli, the gambling billionaire Teddy Sagi, for £440 million.

In 2026, Kovo was reported as being associated with Geyer Development LLC and Shingle Creek Co-Owners LLC, developers of the Tuscana mixed-use project in Orange County, Florida. In September 2026, Orange County commissioners voted 4–3 to approve a modified land-use plan for the approximately 227-acre development, which calls for 4,814 apartments, 1,291 hotel rooms and 653,400 square feet of commercial space near Shingle Creek. The approval followed a special magistrate's recommendation after the developers challenged the county's previous rejection of the project. The development remained subject to further engineering, drainage and other regulatory reviews.

== Personal life ==
He is the father of businessman Oded David Kobo.

Kobo was convicted in 1979 of raping a woman who was a passenger in his car, and was sentenced to 18 months in prison.

In 2015, he bought a 460 sq m house in Arsuf, for 16 million Nis, as part of a creditors' arrangement for brothers Eliyahu and Moshe Shushan and brothers Gad and Dov Slook.

In 2020, he married Israeli model Miri Bohadana, with whom he had been in a relationship since 2005.
