= Transmission (BitTorrent client) =

BitTorrent client

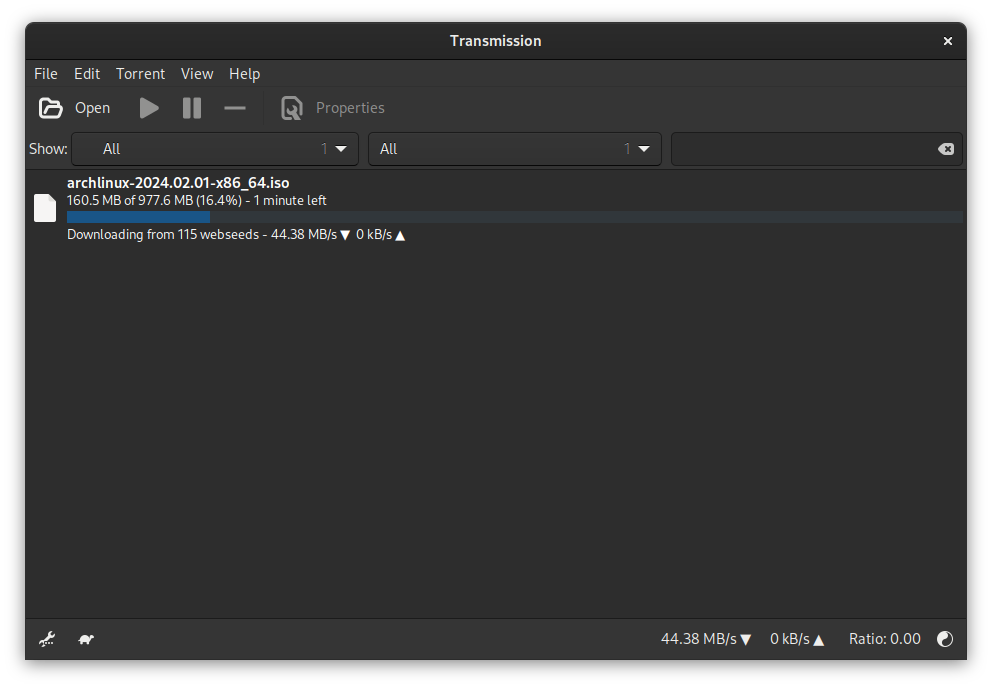
- Transmission 4.0.5 with an active download
- Original authors: Eric Petit, Josh Elsasser, Bryan Varner
- Developers: Mike Gelfand (Windows), Charles Kerr (aka Jordan Lee), Mitchell Livingston
- Release: 15 September 2005; 20 years ago
- Stable release: 4.1.3 / 30 June 2026; 2 months ago
- Written in: C++, Objective-C++
- Operating system: Unix-like, macOS, Microsoft Windows
- Type: BitTorrent client
- License: GPL-2.0-only or GPL-3.0-only (Note: GPL-2.0-only or GPL-3.0-only or any future license endorsed by Mnemosyne LLC.) (Note: With OpenSSL exception.), MIT
- Website: transmissionbt.com
- Repository: github.com/transmission/transmission

Transmission is a BitTorrent client which features a variety of user interfaces on top of a cross-platform back-end. Transmission is free software licensed under the terms of the GNU General Public License, with parts under the MIT License.

== Features ==
Transmission allows users to quickly download files from multiple peers on the Internet and to upload their own files. By adding torrent files via the user interface, users can create a queue of files to be downloaded and uploaded. Within the file selection menus, users can customise their downloads at the level of individual files. Transmission also seeds, that is, it will automatically share downloaded content.

Transmission allows the assigning of priorities to torrents and to files within torrents, thus potentially influencing which files download first. It supports the Magnet URI scheme and encrypted connections. It allows torrent-file creation and peer exchange compatible with Vuze and μTorrent. It includes a built-in web server so that users can control Transmission remotely via the web. It also supports automatic port-mapping using UPnP/NAT-PMP, peer caching, blocklists for bad peers, bandwidth limits dependent on time-of-day, globally or per-torrent, and has partial support for IPv6. It allows the use of multiple trackers simultaneously, Local Peer Discovery, Micro Transport Protocol (μTP), and UDP tracker. It does not support directly subscribing to RSS feeds containing torrent files for automatic download, but third-party add-ons can supply this functionality.

macOS-specific features include Dock and Growl notifications, automatic updates using Sparkle and Universal Binary (up until version 2.22).

Transmission 4.0.0, released in February 2023, does not support version 2 torrents.

== Development ==
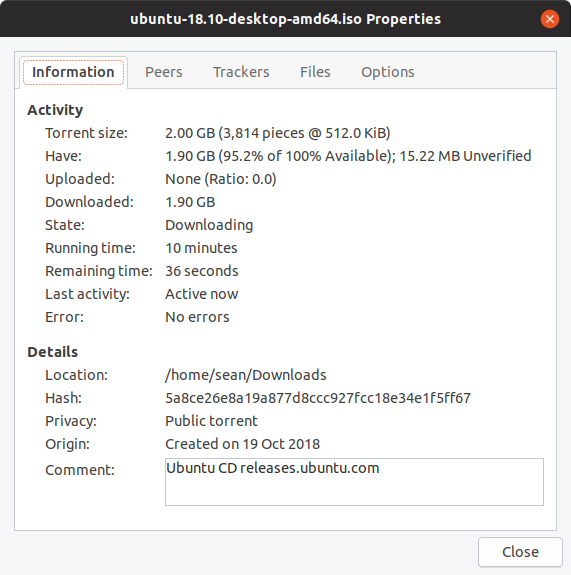
Transmission's torrent activity and settings window.

Transmission 1.60 and later removed support for Mac OS X v10.4. Currently, Transmission 1.54 is the last version that runs on Mac OS X 10.4. Although it is possible to compile later versions from source, either by downloading from the project's website or using a package manager like Fink or MacPorts, it is unsupported and any bugs specific to 10.4 will not be fixed. Starting with Transmission 2.30 an Apple Mac with an Intel CPU is needed; PowerPC-based systems are no longer supported natively. Since Transmission 4.0, Apple Silicon is supported as well.

The Transmission back-end (libTransmission) also serves as the basis of the Transmission daemon. The daemon supports a web front-end called Clutch. Older versions have been ported to form the basis of the update system for the video game Metal Gear Online on PlayStation 3, as well as the backend for ImageShack's BitTorrent service.

== Distribution and ports ==
A portable version is available on PortableApps.com.

=== Ports ===
Transmission is a collection of BitTorrent clients available in GUI, CLI, and daemon forms. The clients use a cross-platform back-end and include graphical and command-line interfaces.

There are several transmission clients for different operating systems including Unix-like, macOS and BeOS/ZETA. Each operating system front-end is built using native widget toolkits. For example, transmission-gtk uses the GTK interface, transmission-qt the Qt interface, and transmission-cli a command-line interface. Transmission-remote-cli is an ncurses interface for the transmission-daemon. Python-transmissionrpc is a Python module implementing the JSON-RPC protocol for Transmission.

An unofficial port of Transmission using a command-line interface (CLI) on iOS was accomplished on 3 March 2008. In November 2010, iTransmission, another unofficial port, was released for jailbroken iPhones sporting a GUI that is capable of downloading directly to the device over WiFi or 3G. A Transmission remote was released for Android, with the name of Transdroid but does not currently support downloading directly to devices.

On Windows, Transmission-Qt can be built with MinGW, the daemon and console tools can be built with Cygwin, also there are two third-party GUIs: transmission-remote-dotnet and Transmission Remote GUI, as well as unofficial full builds of Transmission's Qt Client. There is also an unofficial full build of Transmission daemon which can be run as a Windows service. This same unofficial full build of Transmission daemon running as a Windows service can be used for direct streaming of the downloading file(s).

A port for all platforms enhanced with streaming of the downloading file(s) is located on GitHub.

It is also ported to the Maemo OS of the Nokia N810 internet tablet and N900 smartphone as well as to the MeeGo/Harmattan OS of the Nokia N9 and N950 smartphones, on which it does download the torrents to the device.

=== Website breach ===
In March 2016, Palo Alto Networks reported that Transmission's official website was compromised and tainted .dmg files were uploaded to the site, using an Apple Developer signature to bypass the OS X gatekeeper feature.

The tainted packages installed a ransomware application (a variant of Linux.Encoder.1, but recompiled for Mac, known as KeRanger) that encrypts the user's files and attempts to force users to pay 1 Bitcoin (worth roughly US$404 at the time of the attack) in order to get the decryption pack. The Transmission website advised Mac users to immediately upgrade to a new version that removes the malware-infected file. Apple revoked the developer certificate that was used to sign the tainted package, and added the package's signature to the XProtect anti-malware system.

== Reception ==
Transmission is the default BitTorrent client of many Unix and Linux distributions, including Ubuntu, Mint, Fedora, Puppy, Zenwalk, and the GNOME flavor of openSUSE.

Fon shipped its routers with Transmission pre-installed.

CNET editor Paul Huges praised Transmission for its "simplicity, lightweight, as well as being feature-packed" and as of April 2017 the software ranked third in P2P downloads for Mac on CNET.

== See also ==
- Comparison of BitTorrent clients
- File sharing
