= Acacia Brinley =

American influencer (born 1997)

- Born: Acacia Brinley Clark; October 22, 1997 (age 28)
- Occupation: Influencer
- Years active: 2012–Present
- Spouse: Jairus Kersey (m. 2018–2022)
- Children: 3

Instagram information
- Page: acaciakersey

YouTube information
- Channel: acaciacutie
- Subscribers: 809 thousand
- Views: 5.5 million
- Last updated: March 16, 2026

Acacia Brinley Kersey (née Clark; born October 22, 1997) is an American influencer. She first rose to fame on Tumblr as a teenager for her selfies. She also found popularity on Instagram, where she’d gained over two million followers by 2016, as well as on YouTube, Vine, Pheed, and Twitter.

== Early life ==
Acacia Brinley Clark was born on October 22, 1997. Her mother, Melissa Dawson-Clark, worked as Brinley's manager throughout her social media career, while her father, Rich Clark, works as a children's photographer in Los Angeles. In 2021, according to The Daily Beast, seven women accused Rich of having groomed them into taking sexually charged and nude photos while they were underage. She has one older brother, Peyton Clark, who starred in the Disney Channel series I Didn't Do It in 2014.

Brinley was raised in Orange County, California. According to her, she was bullied at school as a teenager for wearing "whatever was on sale" instead of "whatever was new [or] hot" like her classmates, which led to her being socially isolated and feeling "like [she] didn't even exist".

== Career ==
After creating a Tumblr account at age 12 while in the seventh grade, Brinley started a blog for her selfies, which she posted daily. The blog and her subsequent accounts on Instagram, YouTube, and Twitter soon rose to popularity and garnered thousands of followers; she also soon began making sponsored posts. In 2013, she had more than 138 thousand followers on the pay-per-view social media platform Pheed, where her posts regularly yielded, according to cofounder Phil Haus, five times the engagement of those by Snoop Dogg.

Brinley was featured in the music video for the Chainsmokers' song "#Selfie", released in March 2014. She had more than two million Instagram followers, 460 thousand YouTube subscribers, and 370 thousand Vine followers by September 2014. Also that year, she became the first influencer signed by theAudience, a social media management company founded by Oliver Luckett, with whom she got a sponsorship deal to promote the 2014 Winter Olympics and McDonald's. By 2016, she was known for her makeup and lifestyle posts, which regularly received around 150 thousand likes. She also made frequent sponsored posts for clothing brands such as Nasty Gal, Brandy Melville, and Drop Dead. In June 2017, she was signed to Awestruck, a division of Awesomeness focused on millennial mothers. Brinley acted in the 2017 films American Satan and Another Day in Paradise.

In October 2021, she announced on Instagram that she would be stepping away from being an influencer indefinitely, describing the career as having thoroughly damaged "me, my relationships, my financial stability and my view of the world".

== Public image ==
Brinley had a brief Twitter feud with fellow influencer Taylor Caniff over his tweets referring to women as "props" for music videos in 2017. In 2020, Tumblr posts and tweets made by Brinley as a teenager, in which she had used racial slurs, resurfaced online, for which she publicly apologized.

Commentators in the 2010s often remarked on her branding abilities and successful sponsored posts. In 2014, Taffy Brodesser-Akner described Brinley for The New York Times Magazine as a "microstar" whose brand appeal came from being "relatable and willing to use products — just about anything, really — and talk about them", adding, "These days ... the Acacia Brinleys of the world have almost as much influence as the Charlize Therons, perhaps more, and they engage better with their audiences too." Brinley was similarly described in Caia Hagel and Tatiana Fraser's 2016 book Girl Positive as a microcelebrity who "may be the best illustration" of American author Sarah Banet-Weiser's ideas about "the economy of visibility", due to being a "self-made branding machine" whose success came from "the mere fact of [her] being liked". In his 2016 book The Power of Broke, businessman Daymond John called her "one of the top 'influencers' of today" and a "powerful change-agent ... of our times" and wrote that she was known as the "selfie queen" for having "damn near perfected" the act of taking selfies.

Brinley became known for attracting controversy online, with Stephanie McNeal of BuzzFeed News describing her as having been "one of the most controversial figures on YouTube, Tumblr, and Instagram" for "more than a decade" in 2021. McNeal wrote that the "fervent hatred" for her online did not "make a ton of sense" and "seem[ed] to be rooted in sexism, drama, and general bad vibes". Samantha Schnurr, writing for E! News, also remarked in 2021, "Acacia's time online was not without scandal."

== Personal life ==
Brinley began dating musician Jairus Kersey, a former member of the rock band Alive Like Me, in 2015, and the two soon started a YouTube channel together. They also made music together under the name A&J and released their debut single, "Times Like These", in 2016 to announce that Brinley was pregnant. She gave birth to Brinley, her first daughter with Jairus, in May 2017, and, after the two got married in 2018, had her second child with him that year, a daughter named Rosemary, who was later diagnosed with Alagille syndrome. Her third child and first son with him, Calliope, was born in 2020. Brinley and Kersey had broken up by December 2022.

== Filmography ==
Year	Title	Role	Notes
2012	Code: 9	Herself	Episode: "Snow Globe Surprise"
2017	Another Day in Paradise	Anastasia	
2017	American Satan	Michelle	
