= Arsuf, Hof HaSharon =

Village in central Israel

Arsuf אַרְסוּף
- Community settlement
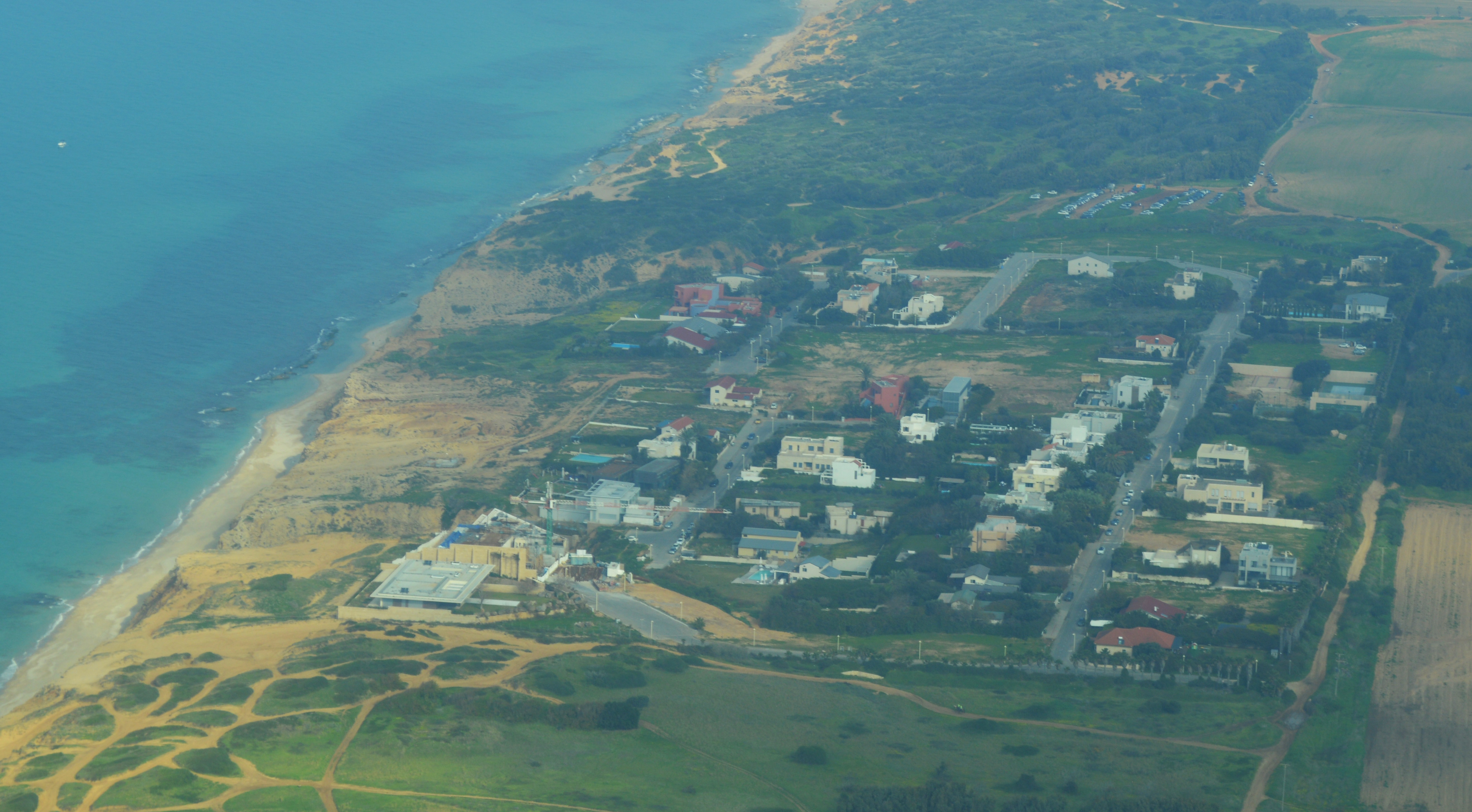
- Arsuf from above

- Location within Central Israel
- Coordinates: 32°13′39″N 34°51′53″E
- Country: Israel
- District: Central
- Subdistrict: HaSharon
- Region: Hof HaSharon
- Established: 1995

Population (2024)
  - Total: 193
- Website: www.arsuf.net

Arsuf (Hebrew: אַרְסוּף) is an affluent community settlement in central Israel. Located on the Mediterranean coast near Herzliya, it falls under the jurisdiction of Hof HaSharon Regional Council. It was established in 1995, named after the medieval fortress city of Arsuf located nearby. In 2024 its population was 193.

== The village ==
Arsuf is a cliff-top village overlooking the Mediterranean. It has two neighborhoods composed of villas, typically 200 to 500 square meters in size. About 65% of the homes have five or more rooms. Homes in Arsuf are among the most expensive in Israel. All buildings in Arsuf are private residences, with no public buildings or businesses. The village has public tennis and basketball courts, a pétanque court, children's playground, and a botanical garden. The cliff-tops, an adjacent national park, and secluded beach area directly below offer a variety of jogging and biking trails. There is no public transport and it is guarded by a private security firm. Residents typically travel to nearby cities such as Herzliya, Tel Aviv, and Netanya for shopping, dining and entertainment, and the children attend schools in a variety of nearby communities, as Arsuf has no educational institutions of its own.

Notable residents include Israeli business magnates Idan Ofer (until 2013), Beny Steinmetz (part-time), and Bebo Kobo and his wife Miri Bohadana.
