= 2026 FIFA World Cup sponsors =

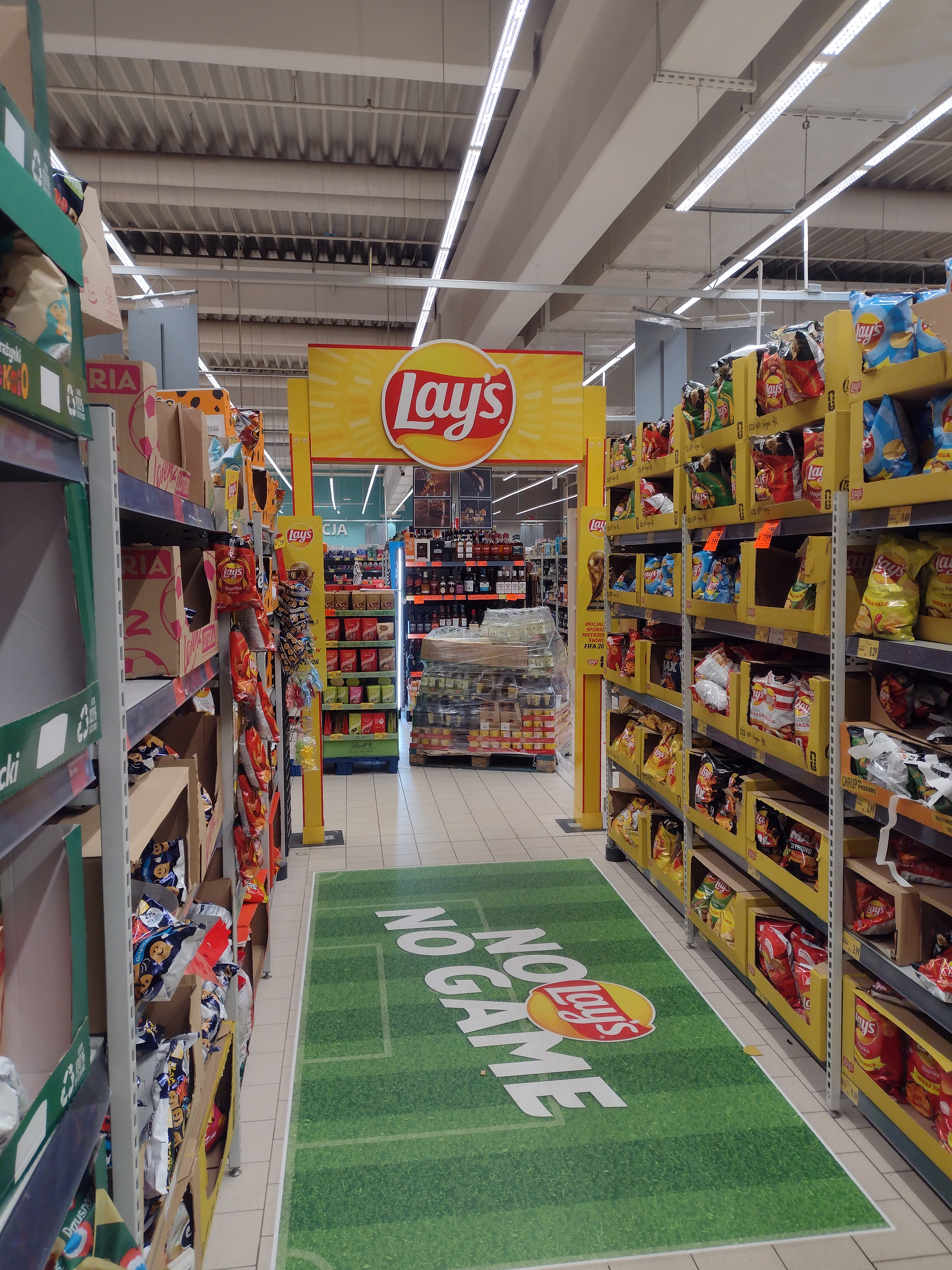
Lay's sponsorship of the 2026 FIFA World Cup in a Kaufland supermarket in Sanok, Poland.

The 2026 FIFA World Cup was an international soccer tournament organized by FIFA, with an expansion over the previous competition from 32 to 48 teams. FIFA-level sponsorship tiers included partners, sponsors, and supporters. There were also regional supporters by geography.

Sponsors for the 2026 event included FIFA's first-ever prediction market sponsor, the Abu Dhabi-based ADI Predictstreet, which launched in time for the tournament. However, with no legal availability in the U.S., ADI announced a partnership with Fanatics Markets for a branded hub for the duration of the tournament. Receiving a small fraction of the business of established competitors during the group stage, ADI announced an additional partnership with rival platform Kalshi, which resulted in the companies sharing ADI's ad placements, such as on rotating sideline signs, beginning with the knockout stage.

== Tournament sponsors ==
FIFA partners	FIFA World Cup sponsors	FIFA World Cup supporters
Adidas; ADI Predictstreet (in partnership with Fanatics Markets and Kalshi); Aramco; Coca-Cola (Powerade, Minute Maid, Fuze Beverage, and others); Hyundai–Kia; Lenovo (Motorola); Qatar Airways; Visa	AB InBev (Budweiser, Corona Cero, Michelob Ultra, Stella Artois, and others); Bank of America; Frito-Lay (Doritos, Lay's, and Sabritas); Hisense (Asko, Gorenje, Regza, and Toshiba); McDonald's; Mengniu Dairy (Bellamy's Organic); Unilever (Dove, Rexona, and others); Verizon	DoorDash (Deliveroo); Marriott Bonvoy; Rock-it Cargo; Valvoline

== Regional sponsors ==
North American supporters	South American supporters	European supporters	Asia-Pacific supporters
Airbnb; American Airlines; Diageo (Buchanan's, Casamigos, Don Julio, Johnnie Walker, and Smirnoff).; ExpressVPN; Globant; Grupo Caliente; Home Depot; Kraken; PepsiCo (Quaker Oats Company, Siete Foods, SodaStream); Public Investment Fund; Salesforce	Betano; Diageo; Inter Rapidísimo; Mercado Libre/Mercado Livre	Betano; Globant; ExpressVPN; Kraken; Salesforce	Hisense (Regza and Toshiba); Japan Airlines–Qantas; Public Investment Fund (Savvy Games Group and Qiddiya City)

== Domestic sponsors ==
Atlanta	Boston	Dallas	Guadalajara
Corpay; Cox Enterprises; Georgia-Pacific; Home Depot; NAPA Auto Parts; Southern Company	Coca-Cola Beverages Northeast; Meet Boston; Sanofi; State Street	Arca Continental; Choctaw Casinos & Resorts; Dallas Cowboys; FC Dallas; North Texas Sports Foundation; UT Southwestern	Guadalajara; GNP Seguros; Jalisco; Zapopan
Houston	Kansas City	Los Angeles	Monterrey
Aramco; Arca Continental; Houston Methodist Hospital; Hunton Group; Quanta Services; Reliant Energy; Rice University; Visit Sugar Land	Black & Veatch; Hallmark; Kansas City Chiefs; Kansas City Royals; J. E. Dunn Construction; Populous; Purina; Sporting Kansas City; University of Kansas Health System	Amgen; Archer Aviation; CyberAgent (Cygames); Discover Los Angeles; Kaiser Permanente; Los Angeles Metro	Adidas; Berel; Corona; Coca-Cola; Guadalupe; Tec de Monterrey; Tribus de Fuego; Uber Eats
Mexico City	Miami	New York/New Jersey	Philadelphia
Club América; Eli Lilly and Company; Farmacias Similares; GNP Seguros; Uber	Bilzin Sumberg; Chewy; Brightline; Griffin Catalyst; Hard Rock Casino; Royal Caribbean; University of Miami	Bristol Myers Squibb; Hackensack Meridian Health; Horizon Blue; Onyx Equities; Paul, Weiss, Rifkind, Wharton & Garrison; Public Service Enterprise Group; Related Companies; Sports Illustrated	Cencora; Comcast; Dick's Sporting Goods; Independence Blue Cross; PECO Energy Company; Penn Medicine; Philadelphia Eagles; VisitPA; William Penn Foundation
San Francisco Bay Area	Seattle	Toronto	Vancouver
Hewlett Packard Enterprise (Juniper Networks); Prologis; Shack15; Roche (Genentech)	Alaska Air Group (Alaska Airlines, Hawaiian Airlines); Amazon; Boeing; Deloitte; Emerald Queen Casino; Microsoft; Port of Seattle; Puyallup Tribe of Indians; University of Washington	Humber Polytechnic; OLG; OPG; Toronto FC	Bell Canada; Coca-Cola Canada Bottling; Concord Pacific Place; Musqueam Indian Band; Pacific National Exhibition; Science World; Squamish Nation; TransLink; Tsleil-Waututh Nation
