= Private Internet Access =

Virtual private network provider

- Developer: Kape Technologies
- Release: August 2010
- Operating system: Android; iOS; Linux; macOS; Windows
- Available in: English
- Type: Virtual private network
- License: Desktop and Android clients: GPLv3; iOS client: MIT License
- Website: privateinternetaccess.com
- Repository: github.com/pia-foss

Private Internet Access (PIA) is a commercial virtual private network (VPN) service provider operated by British-Israeli information security company Kape Technologies. Founded in 2010 by entrepreneur Andrew Lee under the parent organization London Trust Media, the service was originally created to prevent Internet Relay Chat (IRC) channels from exposing user IP addresses. In 2018, former Mt. Gox CEO Mark Karpelès was appointed as the chief technology officer of PIA's parent company, a corporate decision that drew public attention due to his prior financial legal history in Japan. The company has since grown into a major international privacy software provider, expanding its footprint across North America and global markets following its acquisition by Kape Technologies in November 2019.

== Company ==
The CEO of Private Internet Access (and its parent company, London Trust Media, Inc.) is Ted Kim. The company was founded by Andrew Lee. Lee started the company PIA because he wanted a way to prevent Internet Relay Chat from revealing IP addresses.

On November 18, 2019, Private Internet Access announced that it would be merged into Kape Technologies, which operates three competing VPN services, CyberGhost, ExpressVPN and ZenMate. Some users objected to the acquisition, as Kape (under its former name, Crossrider) previously developed browser toolbars bundled with potentially unwanted programs.

== History ==
Founded in 2010, Private Internet Access was formed under parent company London Trust Media and entrepreneur Andrew Lee. The company was formed due to Lee's interest to take privacy mainstream. During their acquisition by Kape Technologies, PIA attempted to reassure customers that privacy and security remained the company's top priority. However, due to the history of Kape Technologies, many users were distrusting.

After merging with Kape Technologies, Private Internet Access became one of many privacy software products offered by the corporation. Along with PIA, Kape also offers CyberGhost, ZenMate, Intego, Webselenese and Restoro. Previously Crossrider, Kape Technologies changed their name in 2018 in order to go under a type of rebranding and "escape a strong association to the past activities of the company" through which they had issues with their previous image being associated with traffic manipulation. After purchasing various other VPN services, Kape Technologies purchased Private Internet Access in order to "aggressively expand their footprint in North America".

== Reception ==
In a 2021 review from TechRadar, Private Internet Access was given a four out five star rating and described as being "A likeable VPN which gives you plenty for your money". According to the review, its most notable features include removing restrictions from streaming services such as Netflix, Amazon Prime Video and Disney+.

PIA also received a positive review from Tom's Guide in November 2021, which highlighted the service's kill switch feature, compatibility with torrents, and "no logging" policy. Tom's Guide found PIA's speeds to be average among VPN services, and stated that a third-party audit would improve the service's credibility.

In a December 2021 test, PCMag determined that PIA reduced "download and upload speeds by just 10.9% and 19.4%, respectively", which was the smallest speed reduction among VPNs tested by the publication at the time. PCMag praised PIA's server selection, connection limit (10 devices), and app, but noted that the service had not yet undergone a third-party audit. In 2022, PIA invited Deloitte, one of the big four auditing firms, to examine its no logs policy and VPN server network. Following the audit, Deloitte Audit Romania announced that, as of June 30, 2022, the server configurations align with internal privacy policies and are not designed to identify users or pinpoint their activities. In later comparisons, PIA has often been commended for combining strong privacy credentials with excellent value. TechRadar’s 2025 ranking of the best US VPNs, for instance, highlighted PIA as one of the most budget-friendly yet reliable providers available. The same review also listed NordVPN, ExpressVPN, Surfshark, and CyberGhost among the top VPN services in the US.

== See also ==
- Comparison of virtual private network services
