= Camden Market =

Retail markets in London, England

Coordinates: 51°32′29″N 0°8′47″W

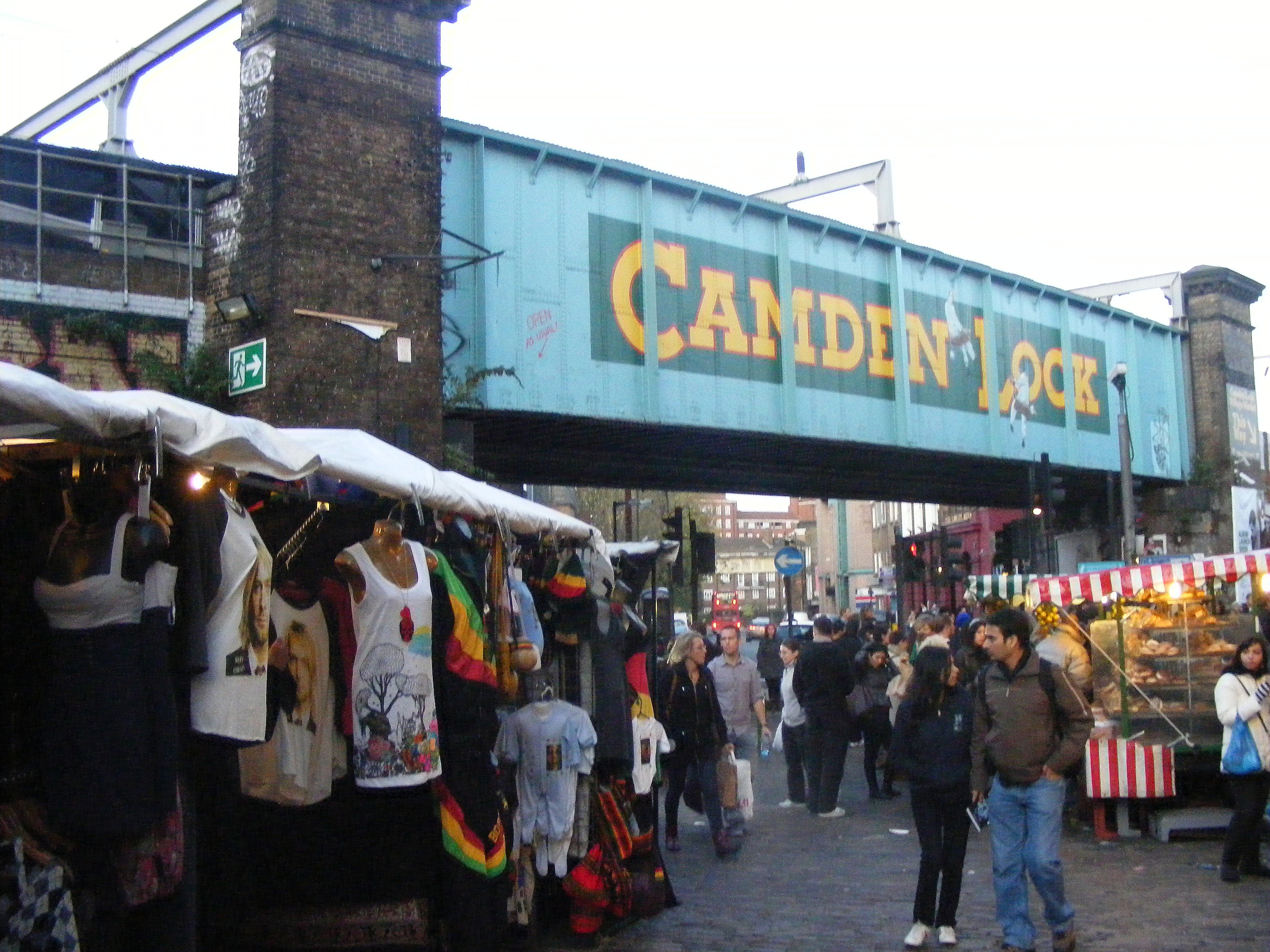
The North London line railway bridge over Chalk Farm Road from Camden Lock Place, a pedestrian-only road with open-air and permanent stalls, and entrances to some of the Camden markets

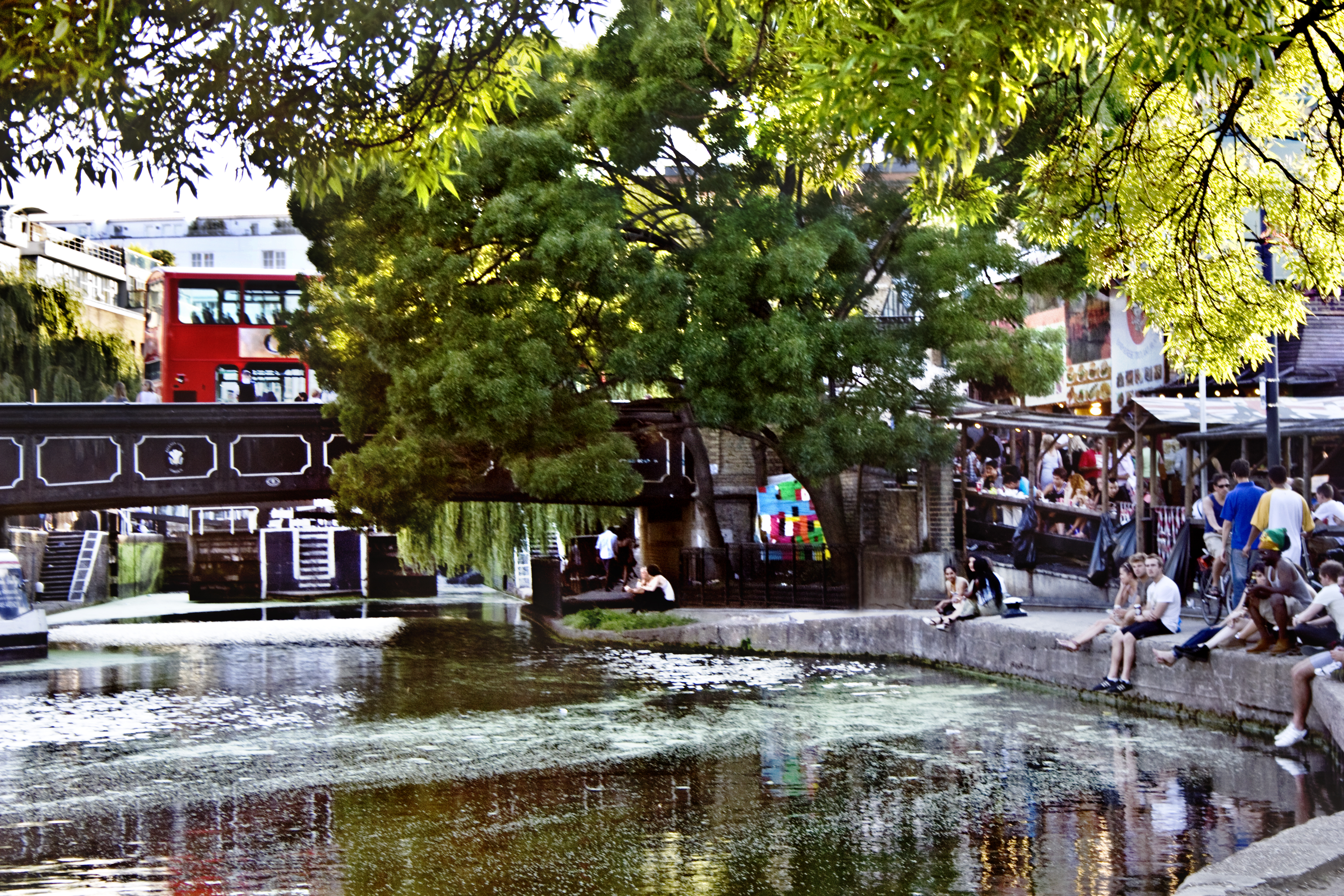
Former Camden Market at the water - demolished in early 2015 to be redeveloped as Hawley Wharf

The Camden markets are a number of adjoining large retail markets, often collectively referred to as Camden Market or Camden Lock, located in the historic former Pickfords stables, in Camden Town, London. It is situated north of the Hampstead Road Lock of the Regent's Canal (popularly referred to as Camden Lock). Famed for their cosmopolitan image, products sold on the stalls include crafts, clothing, books, bric-a-brac, and fast food. It is the fourth-most popular visitor attraction in London, attracting approximately 250,000 people each week.

A small local foodstuffs market has operated in Inverness Street in Camden Town since the beginning of the 20th century, the only significant market in the area. On 30 March 1974 a small weekly crafts market that operated every Sunday near Camden Lock developed into a large complex of markets. The markets, originally temporary stalls only, extended to a mixture of stalls and fixed premises. The traditional Inverness Street market started losing stalls once local supermarkets opened; by mid-2013 all the original stalls had gone, being replaced by stalls similar to those of the other markets, including fast food but not produce. The markets originally operated on Sundays only, which continues to be the main trading day. Opening later extended to Saturdays for most of the market. A number of traders, mainly those in fixed premises—an increasing proportion—operate throughout the week, although the weekend remains the peak period.

Since 2014 most of the markets were acquired by Israeli billionaire Teddy Sagi, who heavily developed them from stalls set up for the day to permanent structures. In 2022 Sagi's company LabTech offered them for sale, hoping for a price of around £1.5 billion. Status was not known as of September 2023.

== The markets ==
There are six distinct Camden markets.

=== Camden Lock Market ===
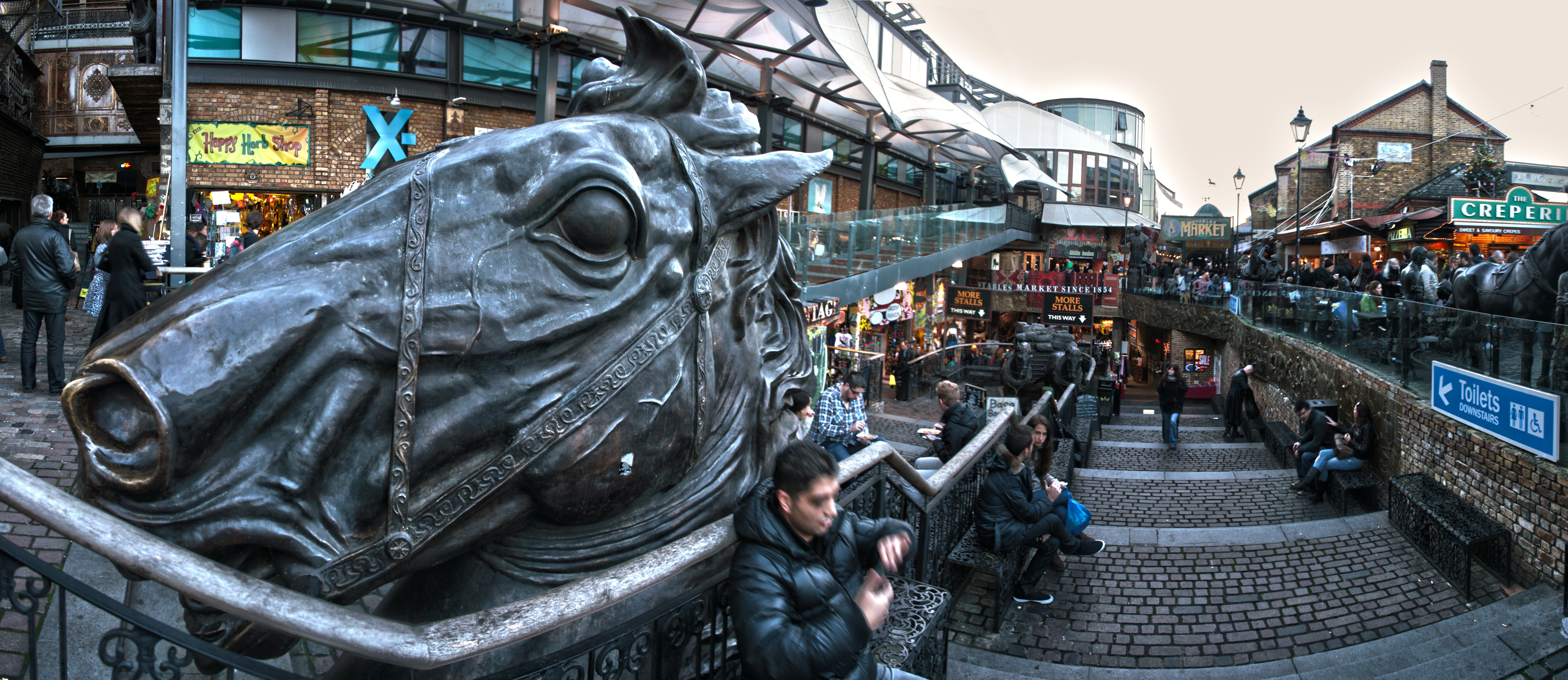
Camden Lock Market

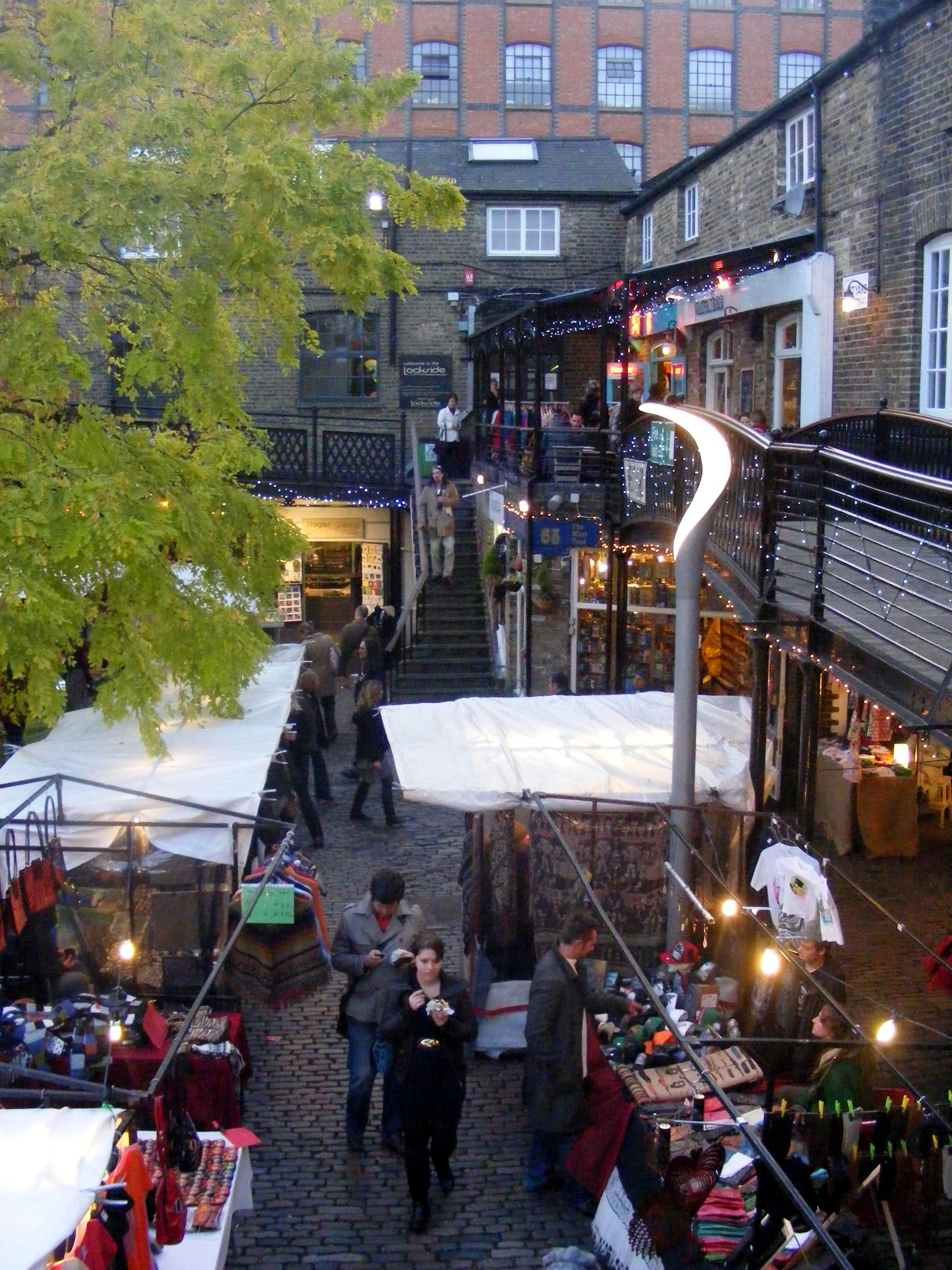
General view

Camden Lock Market is situated by the Regent's Canal on a site formerly occupied by warehouses and other premises associated with the canal. By the early 1970s the canal trade had ceased and a northern urban motorway was planned that would cut through the site, making any major permanent redevelopment impossible, and in 1974 a temporary market was established. By 1976, when plans for the motorway were abandoned, the market had become a well known feature of Camden Town. Originally, the Lock was a market for crafts, occupying some outdoor areas by the canal and various existing buildings.

While the range of goods has since widened, with stalls selling books, new and second-hand clothing, and jewellery, the Lock retains its focus as the principal Camden market for crafts. There is a large selection of fast food stalls. In 1991 a three-storey indoor market hall designed by architect John Dickinson was opened on the site of the first outdoor market. In the style of the traditional 19th century industrial architecture and housing in the area, it is built of brick and cast iron. It attracted large numbers of visitors partly due to stalls being open on Sundays, when previous to the Sunday Trading Act 1994, shops were not permitted to operate on Sundays. On 28 February 1993, the Provisional IRA exploded a bomb hidden in a litter bin on Camden High Street near the market, shortly after lunchtime. The bomb injured 11 people.

From 2006, a large indoor market hall was constructed in a yard between the Camden Lock Market and the Stables Market that was previously used for open air stalls. In November 2007 a large part of the Stables Market was demolished as part of a long-term redevelopment plan for the area and rebuilt as a year-round permanent market area.

In 2016, Urban Markets Company acquired Camden Lock and paid between £300m and £400m for the one-acre site. The joint venture between the founders of Camden Lock and Millitarne Retail Resorts International, the retail developers, was financed by Brockton Capital, a real estate private equity fund. Camden Lock Market is set to have a £20 million makeover to transform it into a traditional arts and craft centre for Londoners. The Urban Market Company plans to double the enclosed area and increase trading space by 15,000 square feet.

==== 2017 fire ====
Early on 10 July 2017, shortly after midnight, a large fire occurred at the Camden Lock Market. At least 70 firefighters and 10 engines attended.

=== Stables Market ===
The Stables Market was owned by Bebo Kobo, Richard Caring and Elliot Bernerd of Chelsfield Partners until 2014. It was sold in 2014 for $685 million to Market Tech PLC, a UK AIM listed public company, later named LabTech. The market is located in the historic former Pickfords stables and Grade II listed horse hospital which served the horses pulling Pickford's distribution vans and barges along the canal. Many of the stalls and shops are set in large arches in railway viaducts.

Chain stores are not permitted and trade is provided by a mixture of small enclosed and outdoor shops and stalls, of which some are permanent, and others hired by the day. In common with most of the other Camden markets the Stables Market has many clothes stalls. It is also the main focus for furniture in the markets. Household goods, decorative, ethnically-influenced items, and second-hand items or 20th-century antiques, many of them hand-crafted, are among the wares. There are also clothing and art pieces for alternative sub-cultures, such as goths and cybergoths. These shops include Black Rose, which caters for goths, with items such as coffin-shaped handbags, and Cyberdog, which houses much cyber-style "neon" PVC and rubber clothing.

During the weeks before Christmas 2004, radio DJ and TV presenter Chris Evans sold many of his possessions, ranging from sofas to TVs and crockery, on a stall in the Stables Market.

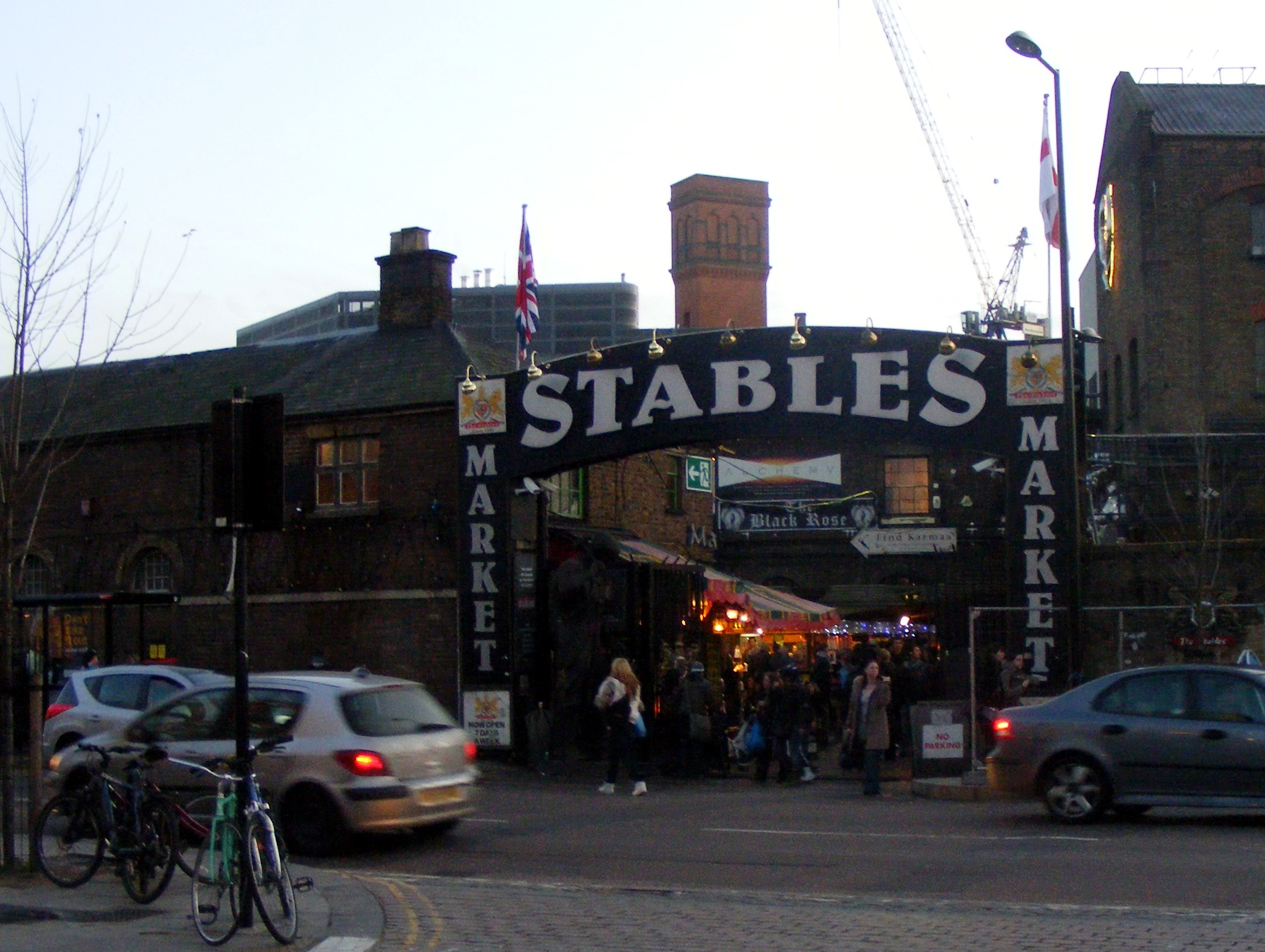
The Stables Market entrance

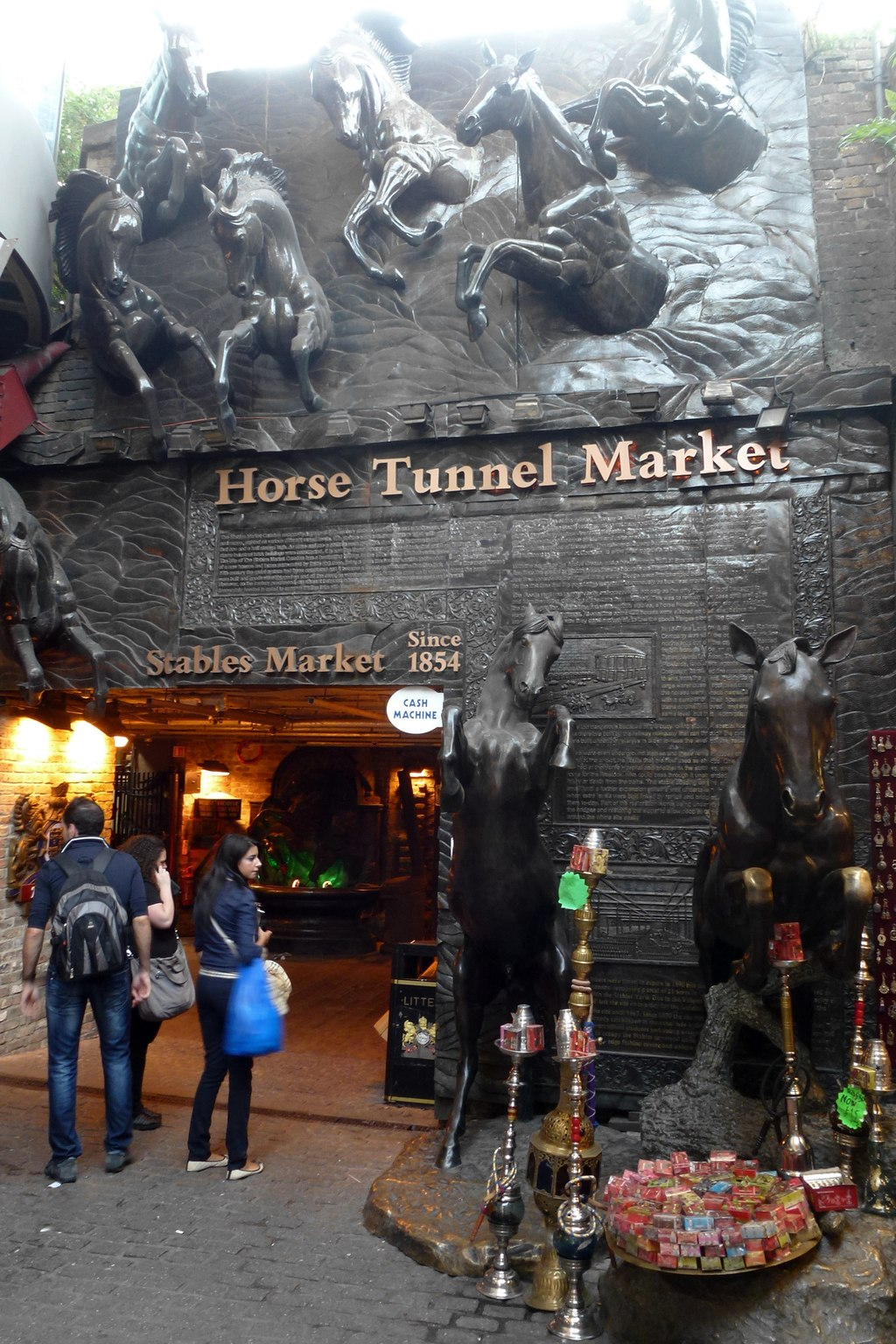
Horse Tunnel Market in August 2012

In October 2006 a large indoor market hall was built in a yard between the Stables Market and Camden Lock Market that was previously used for temporary open-air stalls. In the summer of 2007 redevelopment of the back of the Stables Market took place. This redevelopment consisted of two new four-storey buildings housing shops, food outlets, offices, workshops and storage facilities, as well as an exhibition space. The redevelopment included a new pedestrian route through the rear of the Stables Market exposing 25 of the existing railway arches. Pedestrian walkways—in the style of the existing historic ramp and bridge system—has opened up the site and increased access for visitors. A glass roof and cycle parking spaces has also been added.

On 19 May 2014, at around 8:00 p.m., a fire broke out at the Camden Stables Market on Chalk Farm Road where a reported 10 fire engines and 70 firefighters dealt with the blaze. No injuries were reported by the London Ambulance Service and the London Fire Brigade announced that the fire had been controlled since 9:00 p.m.

=== Hawley Wharf, previously Canal Market and Camden Lock Village ===
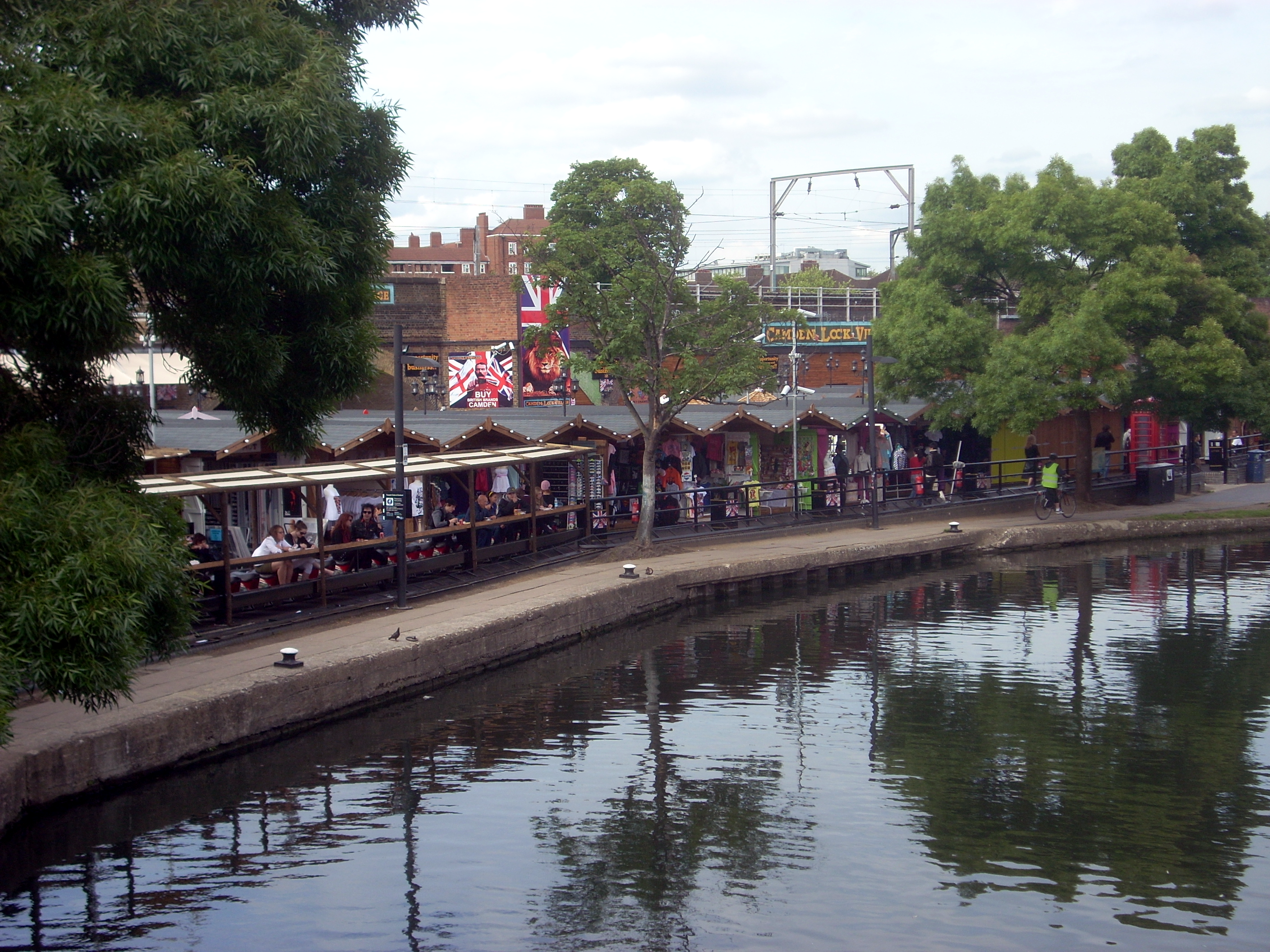
The view of the Camden Lock Village from the bridge over Regent's Canal prior to redevelopment

Owned by Bebo Kobo and OD Kobo, Camden Lock Village was the section along the canal to the east of Chalk Farm Road was known as the Canal Market and had a covered entrance tunnel leading into a general outdoor market. The market was devastated by fire on 9 February 2008 caused by unauthorised use of a liquified petroleum gas heater. After crossing the railway line, the fire badly damaged the rear of the Hawley Arms on Castlehaven Road. The market reopened in May 2009 as the Camden Lock Village. The cover over the original street entrance was removed, and a new entrance created near the railway bridge.

The market closed in early 2015, to be redeveloped over several years at a cost exceeding £500m as Hawley Wharf. The stalls were replaced by a four-storey covered structure, with units housing sixty fast-food providers, 150 shops, and co-working offices. The development also provided 200 homes. Hawley Wharf's sites started opening in 2021.

=== Buck Street Market ===
The Buck Street Market was an outdoor market focusing on clothes. There is no formal or legal definition of Camden Market; the Buck Street Market's sign read 'The Camden Market'. A few stallholders designed their own wares, while at the weekend these designs were more likely to be found in the Electric Ballroom market.

The market closed in its existing form, initially during later postponed plans to rebuild Camden Town tube station. It reopened as a multi-floor structure.

=== Electric Ballroom ===
The Electric Ballroom on Camden High Street has been a night club since the 1950s. The weekend market had been operating here for at least 24 years but closed at short notice in 2015, leaving many staff and traders unemployed.

=== Inverness Street Market ===
A small street market has operated in Inverness Street near Camden Town Tube station since the late 19th century, mostly selling produce, rather than ready-to-eat food, until the 21st century. It started losing its traditional stalls once local supermarkets opened, a trend accelerated by the closing of a nearby bus stop which facilitated access; by mid-2013 all the original stalls had been replaced by "touristy" stalls similar to those of the other markets, including fast food but not produce.

== Ownership ==
The markets were originally a collection of stalls on land with various owners, evolving into a 6.5-hectare (16-acre) patchwork of more than 1,000 stalls, bars, shops, and cafes.

In 2014, Israeli billionaire Teddy Sagi started buying property in the Camden Market area. By March 2015, having purchased the four most important of the six sections of the market, he announced plans to invest £300 million in developing the market area by 2018. The markets, initially a collection of simple stalls plus the Stables building, were heavily developed with permanent structures. In 2022 they were offered for sale with investment bank Rothschild & Co overseeing the sale process, the owner hoping for a price of around £1.5 billion for the markets plus housing, co-working spaces, 3,300-square-metre (35,000 sq ft) and a three-floor leisure centre called Babylon Park. Status was not known as of September 2023.

== CDNX radio ==
Camden Market operates the CDNX (Camden Xperience) radio station which broadcasts "Indie, Rock, Soul and Classic Dance" music. It is run in partnership with Sammy Jacob, founder of XFM, who also operates The Music Machine (TMM). CDNX broadcasts online, as well as on DAB in parts of London.

== See also ==
- Camden Catacombs
- Markets in London
- Portobello Road
