= NetBarrier X4 =

Firewall software

- Developer: Intego
- Final release: 10.4.5 / 2007
- Operating system: OS X
- Type: Firewall
- License: Proprietary
- Website: www.intego.com/netbarrier/

Netbarrier X4 is a discontinued version of the Intego Netbarrier line of its firewall for OS X. It featured a cookie cleaner, a browser history cleaner, internet traffic statistic, an Internet bandwidth meter, cookie filters and information hiding. The firewall was customizable, with already configured options: "No Restrictions", "No Network", "Client (Local Server)", "Server Only", "Client Only", and "Customized". The "Customized" option allowed flexible firewall configuration.

NetBarrier's features were integrated into VirusBarrier X6, and it is no longer sold as a standalone product.
