= Matomy Media =

Publicly traded company

Matomy Media Group Ltd.
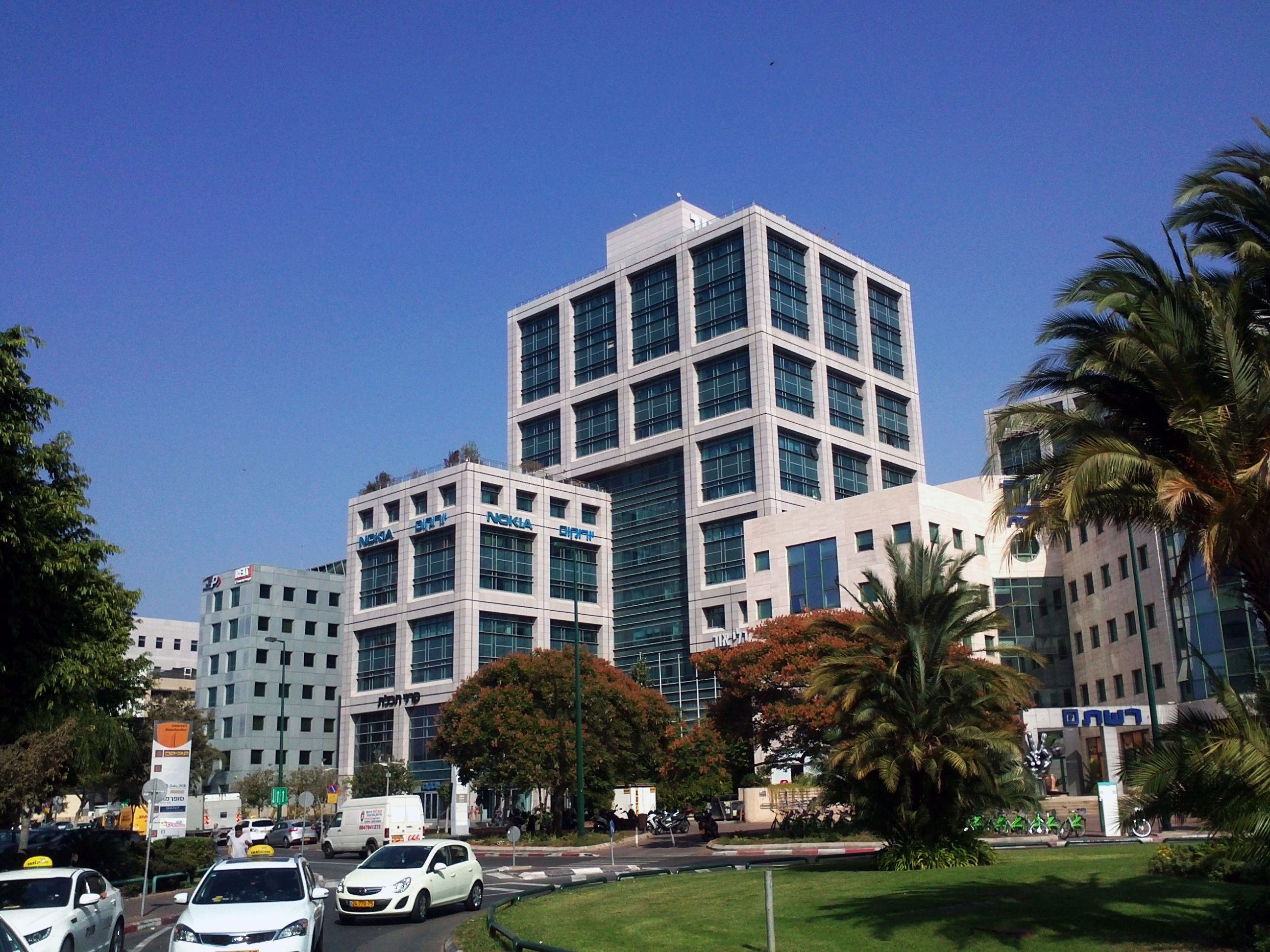
- Matomy's headquarters in Tel Aviv
- Type: Public limited company
- ISIN: IL0011316978
- Industry: Advertising
- Predecessor: AdsMarket
- Founded: 2007
- Founders: Ofer Druker; Adi Orzel; Kfir Moyal
- Headquarters: Tel Aviv, Israel
- Number of locations: 11 (2016)
- Area served: Worldwide
- Key people: Ilan Tomar (COO)
- Products: Team Internet
- Services: Digital marketing
- Revenue: US$ 245.1 Million (2017)
- Number of employees: 250 (2017)
- Website: www.matomy.com

Matomy Media Group Ltd., a publicly traded company since July 2014, is a shell corporation which was the former owner and operator of a number of performance-based and programmatic advertising solutions, which were all sold or closed by the end of 2019.

== History ==
=== Origin ===
The company was incorporated in 2006 and launched in 2007 as AdsMarket. The company was founded in Israel by Ofer Druker, Adi Orzel and Kfir Moyal. The company joined the IAB QAG Certified Network in 2011.

Matomy was advised by Ilan Shiloah since its inception, and he took on the role of chairman until November 2015.

Matomy became a publicly traded company on the High Growth Segment of the London Stock Exchange's Main Market in July 2014. Following its initial public offering, Matomy received an $82 million investment from global advertising holding company Publicis Groupe, which acquired 24.9% of Matomy's ordinary shares.

Matomy dual-listed on the Tel-Aviv Stock Exchange in February 2016.

Matomy grew by investing in companies within the advertising domain, most notably Team Internet (2014), Mobfox (2014) and Optimatic (2015).

=== 2017 Brosh Capital intervention ===
Matomy was led by Ofer Druker from its inception until April 2017, at which point he stepped down at the request of activist hedge fund Brosh Capital, who thought that the company was being mismanaged. Ofer was replaced by Sagi Niri. Brosh Capital also requested that Matomy employee Nir Tarlovsky and Brosh Capital employee Amir Efrati be added to the board of directors, which was approved.

In May 2017, the company announced that it would focus on just three of its products: Team Internet (domain monetization), Mobfox (in-app advertising) and Optimatic (video advertising).

=== 2018-2019 Funding crisis ===
==== Prelude ====
The partial purchase of Team Internet in 2014 allowed the existing shareholders to sell their remaining stakes to Matomy at set intervals, with a valuation based on the performance of Team Internet. The existing shareholders were the three founders of Team Internet: Nico Zeifang, Mario Witte and Stefan Wiegard, equal partners in a holding company called 'Rainmaker'. In the case that Matomy had insufficient funds, the founders would be able to buy back their shares at a 40% discount to the purchase price.

Team Internet had grown significantly, with a valuation of $1.25M in 2012 growing to $185M in 2017. In December 2018, the then CEO Sagi Niri negotiated with the founders to fix the purchase of the remaining 20% of Team Internet to be earlier than required, and fixed at a premium of the 2017 earnings, rather than based on later earnings. The agreement also included a distribution of capital from Team Internet to shareholders, including Matomy, so that Matomy could fund the purchases.

In January 2018, Niri stepped down, in order to "pursue an offer that cannot be refused" with Teddy Sagi. Niri's ten-month tenure oversaw the disposal of non-core assets as well as the laying off of 150 staff in order to focus on just two parts of the company: MobFox and Team Internet. Niri was replaced by Liam Galin, the former CEO of Flash Networks. At the same time, two of the three founders of Team Internet left the company. The Team Internet CEO and founder, Nico Zeifang, was replaced by Markus Ostertag.

==== Revenue decline ====
Following the imposition of stricter quality requirements from video advertisers, the revenue of Optimatic fell significantly and was closed in April 2018. The company also divested of some non-compliant traffic from Team Internet and Mobfox, meaning that the earnings of Team Internet were actually much lower than in 2017.

In February 2018, Matomy raised $30M in convertible bonds in order to fund the purchase of the remaining share options held by Team Internet. The bonds had a duration of three years, bear an interest of 5.5%, and have a conversion price of NIS 4.26. Within a few months, the yields on the company's bonds entered junk bond territory, trading at a significant discount to their face value.

In August 2018, Matomy sold Whitedelivery to 1029 Holdings Inc. However, the buyer subsequently ran into financial difficulties, meaning that Matomy lost the income from this unit without benefiting financially.

In November 2018, Matomy sold Mobfox to Teddy Sagi, the person to whom Sagi Niri had resigned to. This left Team Internet as Matomy's only subsidiary. The CEO Liam Galin said that the sale was partially to fund the acquisition of the remaining shares of Team Internet, and that he was trying to alter the terms of that acquisition, which was due at the end of the same month. Later in the month, the company scheduled a meeting with the company's bondholders in order to seek new terms for the bonds. At this point, the bonds were trading at over a 50% discount to the face value, and the shares had fallen by 95% in the previous two years.

==== Bond renegotiation and rights issue ====
Some bond holders proposed an immediate repayment of the bonds, but this was rejected by a majority of bond holders. Instead, a proposal that the bond holders appoint a trustee to negotiate the terms on the bonds with Matomy was accepted.

The new bond terms were provisionally agreed in January 2019. These terms increased the interest rate to 7%, delayed the payment schedule and enabled prepayment without penalty. In return, the main shareholders agreed to invest $10 million by way of a rights issue, with a promise to invest a further $2 million in bonds if the rights issue to the other shareholders raised less than $2 million. The owners of Team Internet, Rainmaker, also agreed to reduce their expected payment from $18.5 million to $13.5 million.

==== Cost reductions ====
In March 2019, the management structure was slimmed down, after the CEO Liam Galin stepped down to pursue a new venue and was replaced by Sami Totah, a partner at Viola Group, a shareholder of Matomy. The company also replaced its resigned in house legal advisor with the law firm Meitar Liquornik Geva Leshem Tal. The company office was closed and the company address was changed to that of the law firm. To reduce costs, the market maker for their Tel Aviv securities was discharged from the end of June 2019.

==== Offers for Team Internet ====
In April 2019, after no progress had been made by Matomy towards a bond renegotiation and rights issue, the minority shareholders of Team Internet exercised their option to buy back all their shares from Matomy at a 40% discount to the price paid. This totalled $36 million, which would first be used to repay the bondholders. Bondholders approved the offer and also approved bond repayment at par value, totalling NIS 101 million ($28 million), leaving a surplus of $10 million for Matomy. Matomy also confirmed that a German tax refund of approximately $4 million would remain payable to Matomy rather than Team Internet. The deal would leave Matomy with a cash balance of approximately $19 million and no business activities.

In June 2019, Matomy reported that the minority shareholders of Team Internet wanted to re-assess their offer for the whole of Team Internet after a handful of accounts were deactivated by Team Internet due to quality issues. Whilst the offer was in jeopardy, the company proposed that current and former executives should be awarded bonuses. These proposals were dropped within 24 hours at the request of the bondholders, but would reappear later, following the eventual sale of Team Internet. In August 2019 the offer for Team Internet was dropped, but in the same month, Matomy reported that it had received multiple non-binding offers for Team Internet that would likely enable it to meet all its financial obligations.

==== Sale of Team Internet ====
Team Internet was sold in December 2019 to CentralNic for $48M, comprising $45M of cash and $3M in shares. The first payment of $44M, together with $3M of Matomy's cash, was used to purchase the final 10% of Team Internet from Rainmaker and to repay the bondholders in full. Matomy is due to receive a second payment six months after the acquisition of $1.8M, and a third payment of $600K fifteen months after the acquisition. Matomy also received 3,911,650 shares in CentralNic, subject to a lock-up period of 12–18 months. Matomy also received interest whilst the deal was being finalised, of approximately $800K. This transaction left Matomy with no active business.

==== Offer for the cash shell ====
On the day preceding the sale of Team Internet, director Nir Tarlovsky sold his stake in Matomy, followed the day after by ex-director Ilan Shiloah. On the same day a hostile takeover was announced by Kfir Silberman. He sent a letter to the company declaring that he had taken a 5% stake in the company and requested that no action be taken in the company's assets until the directors of Medigus, an Israeli Medical device maker that Silberman controlled, had been made directors of Matomy. Separately, Globes reported that Silberman was negotiating with Publicis and other shareholders to buy their stakes. Silberman and Medigus had previously acquired the cash shell Intellisense for the purpose of listing their subsidiary ScoutCam.

The company suppressed publication of the official disclosure of Silberman's stake building for eight days, and did not publicly respond to Silberman, instead proposing that shareholders award bonuses to the current and former management team. These were subsequently approved by shareholders.

On 13 February 2020, the Israeli medical device maker Medigus announced that they were in negotiations to buy 24.99% of the company from other shareholders. Four days later, Viola announced that they had sold their stake, and that the chairman of Matomy, who was also a partner at Viola, would be resigning from Matomy. The following day, Medigus announced that they had purchased 2.3% of the company at a premium of 20%, with an intention to purchase 22.7% more at the same price. These shares were purchased from Publicis on 25 March 2020. A shareholder meeting was convened to vote on replacing the Matomy management team with directors from Medigus.

=== Team Internet ===
Team Internet is the parent company of ParkingCrew and Tonic (formerly DNTX), and is a Munich-based domain parking company launched in 2010 by Nico Zeifang, Stefan Wiegard and Mario Witte. The founders had accumulated a portfolio of 60,000 domains but were not satisfied with the domain monetization platforms on offer, in particular the fact that large advertisers ignored low traffic sites, so they created their own advertising exchange, DNTX. Domain monetization was offered as a service to the public in 2012. By 2018, the company owned 48,000 domains.

Year	Action	Notes
2012	Purchase of 20% stake	The stake cost $2.5M, valuing the company at $12.5M.
2014	Stake increased to 70% from 20%	The stake cost $27M, valuing the company at $54M.
2017	Stake increased to 80% from 70%	The acquisition was instigated by options held by Team Internet, and cost $10.4M, valuing the company at $104M.
2018	Stake increased to 90% from 80%	The acquisition was instigated by options held by Team Internet, and cost $18.5M, valuing the company at $185M.
2019	Sold	The entire company was sold to CentralNic for $48M. Due to a liability to the remaining 10% owners, Matomy received only $27M from the sale.

=== Others ===
Company	Year	Action	Notes
Xtend G.M. Global Media Ltd	2008	Outright acquisition	Online display network and SEM provider.
Matomy Money	2010	Outright acquisition	Alternative payment solutions provider
Adperio	2011	17.7% stake acquisition	Denver-based interactive marketing company, founded in 1994 that offers social media, email, SEO, mobile and other emerging technology solutions. The initial acquisition was for 15% of the company for $2.25M, with call and put options in the following years which were not exercised.
MediaWhiz	2013	Outright acquisition	New York-based performance marketing agency that provided clients with permission-based email marketing, affiliate marketing and data acquisition.
Adquant	2013	Acquisition of the social marketing agency portion	Provider of software for running social media campaigns.
MobFox	2014	Outright acquisition	Austrian-based mobile programmatic advertising firm. The acquisition was paid using $10.1M in cash, plus shares worth $7.5M.
MobAff	2013	Outright acquisition	Florida-based mobile ad network.
Avenlo	2015	70% stake acquisition	Canadian-based company who had developed a platform for direct email marketing campaigns. The acquisition has been valued at around $17.6M.
Optimatic	2015	Outright acquisition	Programmatic monetization platform for video advertising. Matomy paid a minimum of $25M for Optimatic.
'Non-core' businesses'	2017	Sold to Creative Clicks Media	The sale was worth up to $11M, and included 60 Matomy employees.
Adperio	2017	Sold to unrelated third party	The sale was worth approximately $2M.
Optimatic	2018	Closure	The video advertising platform Optimatic stopped trading in April 2018. CEO Liam Galin described it as a "cash-bleeding" activity.
Whitedelivery	2018	Sold to 1029 HOLDINGS INC	The email advertising platform Whitedelivery was sold to 1029 HOLDINGS INC in August 2018. The price at the time of the sale was reported as $8.5 million, but the buyer subsequently ran into financial difficulties and was unable to pay.
MobFox	2018	Sold to Tightline Holdings Ltd	The mobile advertising platform was sold to Tightline Holdings Ltd (part of Teddy Sagi group) in November 2018 for $7.5 million.
