= Kape Technologies =

British-Israeli computer security company

- Formerly: Crossrider
- Type: Private
- Industry: Information security
- Founded: 2011
- Founder: Smueli Achdut; Koby Menachemi
- Headquarters: London, United Kingdom
- Owner: Teddy Sagi
- Subsidiaries: CyberGhost; Private Internet Access; ZenMate; ExpressVPN; Intego
- Website: kape.com

Kape Technologies plc (formerly Crossrider Ltd.) is a British-Israeli information security company owned by businessman Teddy Sagi. Kape owns the VPN service and cybersecurity companies CyberGhost, Private Internet Access, ZenMate, ExpressVPN, and Intego.

The development center of Kape is located in the Azrieli Sarona Tower in Tel Aviv.

== History ==
=== 2011-2017: Crossrider ===
Logo as of 2014

Crossrider was founded in 2011 by Smueli Achdut and Koby Menachemi.

Menachemi was previously a developer for Unit 8200, an signals intelligence unit of the IDF.

In late 2012, Israeli businessman Teddy Sagi acquired Crossrider for $37 million. The company went public on AIM at a value of $250 million. Crossrider started off by making a software development kit (SDK) for the deployment of browser extensions to a variety of platforms with support for monetizing extensions. The monetization options were used by major ad injectors which used man-in-the-browser to change or add advertisements to what users saw. Over time, Crossrider's services became increasingly utilized by malware and adware developers and the company was unable to combat misuse.

In May 2014, it acquired Ajillion for $2.2 million and Definiti Media for $15-$20 million dollars.

In June 2016, following the appointment of new management team, the company changed its strategy to focus to cyber-security with a focus on digital privacy and protection of digital data. In practical terms, the company stopped its browser SDK business to focus on the VPN sector, purchasing CyberGhost VPN in 2017.

=== 2018-current: Kape Technologies ===
In March 2018, the name of the company was changed to Kape Technologies plc.

Kape purchased VPN services Zenmate in 2018, Private Internet Access in 2019 and ExpressVPN in 2021. It also acquired the VPN service review publisher Webselenese in 2021.
