= Cyberdog (shop) =

Shop in Camden Market in London

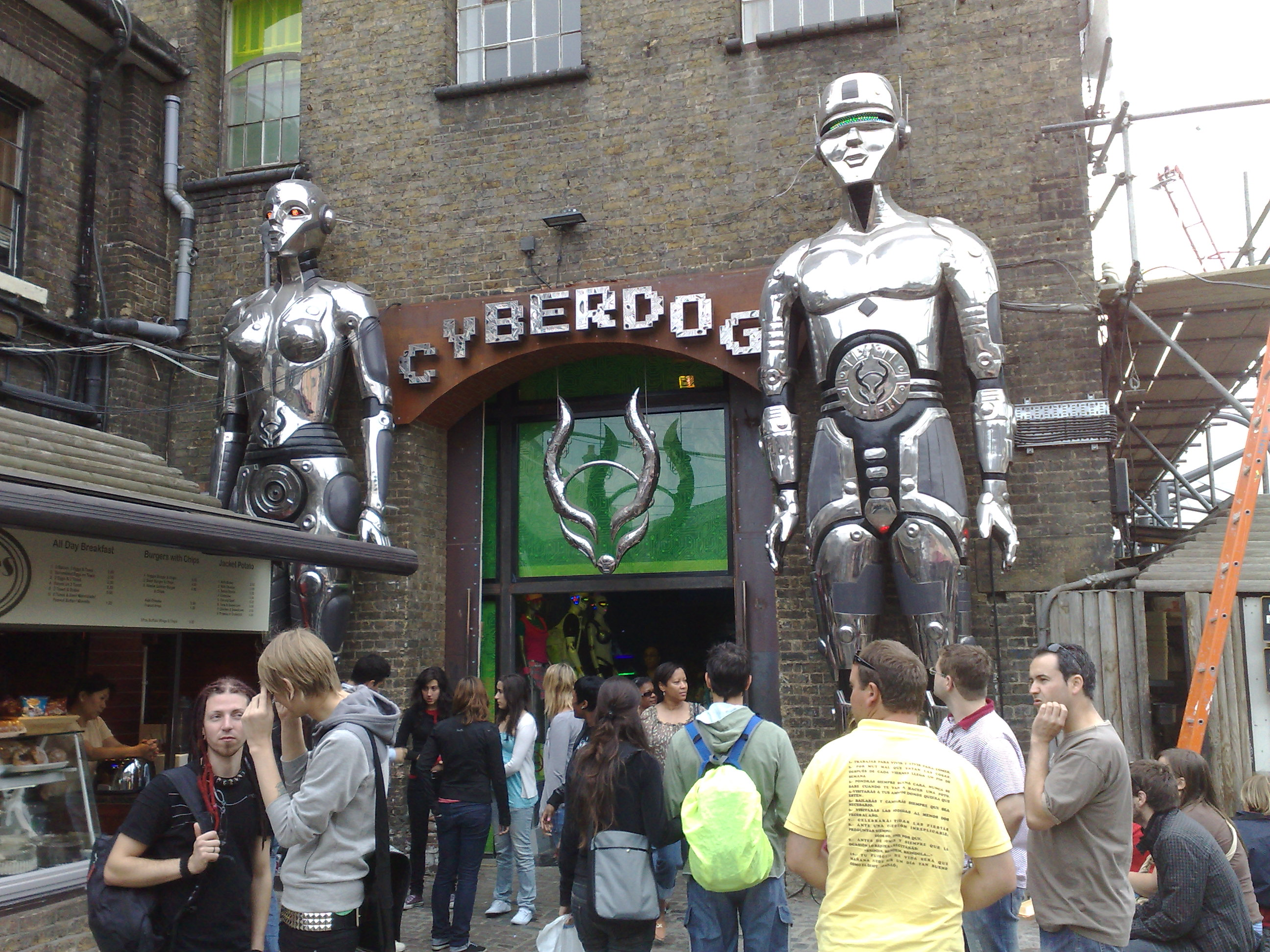
The current Cyberdog store in Camden Market, London.

Cyberdog is a trance music and cyber clothing retail chain. Headquartered in Camden Market, London, it specialises in bright dance clothing, often featuring fluorescent colours and electronic components such as flashing lights. They also specialise in rave accessories such as glowsticks and other fluorescent items.

== About ==
Cyberdog is a store in England that sells rave-wear and toys divided into four categories: Kawaii, Neon Clubwear, 2090s (or Futuristic), and Cybertronic. Products sold include clothing, jewelry, shoes and rave-toys.

Cyberdog was founded by fashion designer Terry Davy and business manager Spiros Vlahos. They began with a small stall in Camden Market in 1994, mostly selling goa trance items and designer clothing created by Davy. The couple's pet chihuahua, "Chichi the Cyberdog", inspired the name of their store and was featured as part of its brand image.

The business was successful and grew, relocating to an underground space in the Stables Market part of Camden Market. There are Cyberdog franchises in Ibiza Town, Spain, and Sharm el-Sheikh, Egypt. Stores were previously also located in Manchester (closed in February 2018), Brighton (closed in January 2019) and Basel, Switzerland (closed sometime between 2005 and 2020). In November 2012, Cyberdog announced the launch of a sister brand 'Futurelovers', selling sex toys and fetish clothing.
