= Selfie (song) =

2014 single by the Chainsmokers

"#Selfie"

Single by the Chainsmokers
- Released: January 29, 2014
- Recorded: 2013
- Genre: EDM
- Length: 3:03
- Label: Dim Mak; Republic
- Songwriter: Andrew Taggart
- Producer: The Chainsmokers

The Chainsmokers singles chronology
"The Rookie" (2012)	"#Selfie" (2014)	"Kanye" (2014)

"#Selfie" (stylized in all caps) is a satirical song produced by American DJ duo the Chainsmokers. It was released on January 29, 2014 with Dim Mak Records.

== Background and promotion ==
The Chainsmokers, composed of Andrew Taggart and Alex Pall, had noticed how the word selfie had become a trend and they wanted to take advantage of it. They made a demo of a song containing a monologue from a female clubber about taking good selfies. Inspiration came from the regular club-going women that the Chainsmokers saw on their nights out in New York City, with one of the goals of the track being to incorporate the line "let me take a selfie." The Chainsmokers described in an interview with The Phoenix New Times,

Honestly, "#Selfie" is kind of a phenomenon for us. We made it and thought it was funny and put it out as an edit. Then Dim Mak wanted to buy it, and they bought it from us and put it out officially and we made a video for it. This was all just because we thought it was fun. And then the song just kind of took on a life of its own. Which is honestly really great because it's brought in a new audience of people that listen to music that we've made that we're more passionate about.

The duo released the track to their SoundCloud account along with other posts in Vine and Instagram.

== Music video ==
A music video for the song was also released and features actual selfies from Steve Aoki, founder of Dim Mak, Snoop Dogg, David Hasselhoff, Tyler Breeze, A-Trak, The Knocks, Acacia Brinley, and Ian Somerhalder among others. Oliver Luckett, CEO of social media marketing firm TheAudience, said that the song is "so on point – it's shit-white-girls-say-meets-a-club-remix". TheAudience introduced the Chainsmokers to Aoki, helped create the "#Selfie" video and released it on January 29, 2014, on YouTube, utilizing the network of celebrities to promote it. According to Pall, "the video inherently had this viral concept built into it, which certainly helped get it off the ground".

== Composition ==
"#Selfie" includes spoken word verses; the uncredited female voice is Alexis Killacam. The song details a narcissistic young woman at a club, presumably speaking to friends, as she is concerned about taking selfies and uploading them to her Instagram account, while she criticizes other people at the club, including their outfits, in addition to dealing with a guy named Jason with whom she has a love/hate relationship. At the end of each spoken verse, she says "Let me take a selfie". The lyrics make several cultural references, including to Instagram and the Cedric Gervais remix of Lana Del Rey's song, "Summertime Sadness".

== Critical reception ==
The song has been compared to the viral impact of "Harlem Shake" by Baauer. The Chainsmokers explained that one of their initial intentions with "#Selfie" was to re-create the viral impact that "Harlem Shake" had, with the general public taking the song and maybe including their own interpretations along with the beat. The structure of it has drawn comparisons to the 1982 hit "Valley Girl" by Frank Zappa and his daughter, Moon Unit Zappa.

== Commercial performance ==
"#Selfie" debuted on the Billboard Dance/Electronic Songs chart at number 19, with first week sales of 9,000 digital downloads according to Nielsen SoundScan. The next week, "#Selfie" sold another 53,000 digital downloads and debuted at number 55 on the Billboard Hot 100, the highest debut of the week. The sales drove the song to number six on the Dance/Electronic Songs and number three on the Dance/Electronic Digital Songs charts. "#Selfie" additionally debuted at number seven on Dance/Mix Show Airplay, becoming only the sixth song in the chart's 11-year history to debut as high or above and the first since Lady Gaga entered at number six with "Alejandro" in May 2010. In its third week of release, the song sold another 88,000 downloads (up by 64%) to move into the top ten of the Hot Digital Songs chart. It also reached a peak of number 27 on the Pop Songs chart. On the Hot 100, the song consecutively jumped to number 28. It also started on the Hot Dance Club Songs chart at number 33. The fourth week saw the song sell a further 111,000 digital downloads and moved to number 18 on the Hot 100. It reached the top of the Dance/Electronic Songs, and also moved up the other charts like Dance/Electronic Streaming Songs (16–7; 1.4 million US streams, according to Nielsen BDS), Dance/Mix Show Airplay (4–2) and Hot Dance Club Songs (33–19). "#Selfie" sold another 101,000 copies next week and moved to number 16 on the Hot 100. As of June 2014, the song has sold 865,000 copies in the United States.

In the United Kingdom, "#Selfie" debuted at number 115 on the UK Singles Chart and moved to number 42 the next week. The song finally peaked at number 11 in the UK. In Australia "#Selfie" debuted at number 98 on the ARIA Charts, and moved to a peak of number 3.

In 2015, the Japanese pop trio MAX released a cover version of the song, renamed "#SELFIE ~ONNA NOW~." The song was released to commemorate their 20th anniversary.

== Track listing ==
Digital download
No.	Title	Length
1.	"#Selfie"	3:03

Remixes
No.	Title	Length
1.	"#Selfie" (Botnek Remix)	3:36
2.	"#Selfie" (Will Sparks Remix)	3:52
3.	"#Selfie" (Caked Up Remix)	3:15
Total length:		10:43

German CD single
No.	Title	Length
1.	"#Selfie" (Original Mix)	3:04
2.	"#Selfie" (Club Mix)	4:01
Total length:		7:05

== Charts ==
=== Weekly charts ===
Chart (2014)	Peak position
Australia (ARIA)	3
Australia Dance (ARIA)	3
Austria (Ö3 Austria Top 40)	16
Belgium (Ultratop 50 Flanders)	14
Belgium Dance (Ultratop Flanders)	20
Belgium (Ultratop 50 Wallonia)	24
Canada Hot 100 (Billboard)	13
CIS Airplay (TopHit)	53
Czech Republic Airplay (ČNS IFPI)	11
Czech Republic Singles Digital (ČNS IFPI)	10
Denmark (Tracklisten)	9
Finland (Suomen virallinen lista)	1
France (SNEP)	55
Germany (GfK)	38
Hungary (Stream Top 40)	8
Ireland (IRMA)	14
Mexico Anglo (Monitor Latino)	6
Netherlands (Single Top 100)	12
Netherlands (Dutch Top 40)	9
New Zealand (Recorded Music NZ)	12
Norway (VG-lista)	3
Poland Dance (ZPAV)	21
Poland (Video Chart)	4
Russia Airplay (TopHit)	53
Scottish Singles Sales (Official Charts)	7
Slovakia Airplay (ČNS IFPI)	54
Slovakia Singles Digital (ČNS IFPI)	27
Slovenia (SloTop50)	49
Spain (Promusicae)	45
Sweden (Sverigetopplistan)	2
Sweden Dance (Sverigetopplistan)	2
Switzerland (Schweizer Hitparade)	33
UK Singles (Official Charts)	11
UK Dance (Official Charts)	5
Ukraine Airplay (TopHit)	37
US Billboard Hot 100	16
US Dance Airplay (Billboard)	2
US Dance Club Songs (Billboard)	8
US Hot Dance/Electronic Songs (Billboard)	1
US Pop Airplay (Billboard)	14
US Rhythmic Airplay (Billboard)	23

=== Year-end charts ===
Chart (2014)	Position
Australia (ARIA)	100
Belgium (Ultratop Flanders)	80
Belgium (Ultratop Wallonia)	89
Canada (Canadian Hot 100)	86
Denmark (Hitlisten)	48
France (SNEP)	185
Netherlands (Dutch Top 40)	74
Russia Airplay (TopHit)	145
Sweden (Sverigetopplistan)	29
US Hot Dance/Electronic Songs (Billboard)	14

== Certifications ==
Region	Certification	Certified units/sales
Australia (ARIA)	Platinum	70,000^{^}
Brazil (Pro-Música Brasil)	Gold	30,000^{‡}
Canada (Music Canada)	Platinum	80,000^{*}
Germany (BVMI)	Gold	150,000^{‡}
Italy (FIMI)	Platinum	30,000^{‡}
New Zealand (RMNZ)	Gold	7,500^{*}
Sweden (GLF)	3× Platinum	120,000^{‡}
United Kingdom (BPI)	Silver	200,000^{‡}
United States (RIAA)	Platinum	1,000,000^{‡}
Streaming
Denmark (IFPI Danmark)	Platinum	2,600,000^{†}
^{*} Sales figures based on certification alone.^{^} Shipments figures based on certification alone.^{‡} Sales+streaming figures based on certification alone.^{†} Streaming-only figures based on certification alone.

== Release history ==
Region	Date	Format	Label(s)
Netherlands	February 28, 2014	Digital download	Dim Mak
Switzerland	February 28, 2014	Digital download	Dim Mak
United States	March 4, 2014	Mainstream airplay	Dim Mak; Republic
