= Dr.Web =

Antivirus software suite

- Developer: Doctor Web
- Release: 1992
- Stable release: 12.0.4 Build 12100
- Operating system: Linux macOS; Windows; MS-DOS; OS/2; Windows Mobile; Android; BlackBerry
- Available in: 6 languages
- List of languages Russian, English, French, German, Japanese, Korean
- Type: Antivirus
- Website: www.drweb.com

Dr.Web is a software suite developed by Russian anti-malware company Doctor Web. First released in 1992, it became the first anti-virus service in Russia.

Dr.Web withdrew from AV tests such as Virus Bulletin VB100% around 2008, stating that they believe that virus scans on viruses are different subject from that of real world malware attacks.

== Malware discoveries ==
=== Flashback Trojan ===
Dr.Web discovered the Trojan BackDoor.Flashback variant that affected more than 600,000 Macs.

=== Trojan.Skimer.18 ===
Dr.Web discovered the Trojan.Skimer.18, a Trojan that works like an ATM software skimmer. The Trojan can intercept and transmit bank card information processed by ATMs as well as data stored on the card and its PIN code.

=== Linux.Encoder.1 ===
Dr.Web discovered the ransomware Linux.Encoder.1 that affected more than 2,000 Linux users. Linux.Encoder.2 which was discovered later turned out to be an earlier version of this ransomware.

== Trojan.Skimer discovery and attacks on Doctor Web offices ==
Doctor Web received a threat supposedly from the Trojan writers or criminal organization sponsoring this malware's development and promotion: On March 31, 2014, after two arson attacks were carried out on Igor Daniloff's anti-virus laboratory in St. Petersburg, company received a second threat. Doctor Web released a statement that the company considers it its duty to provide users with the ultimate protection against the encroachments of cybercriminals and consequently, efforts aimed at identifying and studying ATM threats with their ATM Shield.

== Awards ==
- 2008: anti-malware.ru website conducted a test for the treatment of active infection, only Dr.Web scored the maximum possible number of points (15) and received Platinum Malware Treatment Award.
- 2009: anti-malware.ru website conducted a self-protection test of antivirus products, only Dr.Web scored the maximum possible number of points (38) and received Platinum Self-Protection Award.
- 2009: anti-malware.ru website conducted proactive protection test, Dr.Web took the second place and received Silver Proactive Protection Award.
- 2010: Platinum Self-Protection Award from Anti-Malware.ru.

== Controversies ==
Staunch anti-adware policy led to software developers complaining that Dr.Web treated their virus free applications as a "virus". When developers tried contacting Dr.Web to resolve the issue, developers received no response.

In Jun 2022, allegedly pro-Ukrainian hacktivists DumpForums, who had hacked into the website of the Russian Ministry of Construction, Housing and Utilities (minstroyrf.gov.ru) claim that they obtained 10TB of data from the anti-malware company Doctor Web (Dr.Web) in September 2024.

== See also ==
- Antivirus software
