= ExpressVPN =

Virtual private network provider

- Developer: Kape Technologies
- Type: Virtual private network service
- Launched: 2009; 17 years ago
- Platforms: Personal computer; Router; Smartphone
- Operating systems: Android; iOS; Linux; macOS; Windows; tvOS; Android TV
- Status: Active
- Website: expressvpn.com

Express Technologies Ltd. is company that operates the ExpressVPN VPN service and the ExpressKeys password manager. Since 2021, it is a subsidiary of British-Israeli information security company Kape Technologies.

== History ==
ExpressVPN was founded in 2009 by Peter Burchhardt and Dan Pomerantz, two entrepreneurs who were also both Wharton School alumni.

In July 2017, ExpressVPN announced in an open letter and later a public statement by Apple, that Apple had removed all VPN apps from its App Store in China, a revelation that was later picked up by The New York Times and other news outlets. In response to questions from U.S. Senators, Apple stated it removed the VPNs due to a request from the Chinese government.

In December, ExpressVPN came into the spotlight in relation to the investigation of the assassination of Russian ambassador to Turkey, Andrei Karlov. Turkish investigators seized an ExpressVPN server which they say was used to delete relevant information from the assassin's Gmail and Facebook accounts. Turkish authorities were unable to find any logs to aid their investigation, which the company said verified its claim that it did not store user activity or connection logs, adding, "while it's unfortunate that security tools like VPNs can be abused for illicit purposes, they are critical for our safety and the preservation of our right to privacy online. ExpressVPN is fundamentally opposed to any efforts to install 'backdoors' or attempts by governments to otherwise undermine such technologies."

In December 2019, ExpressVPN became a founding member of the VPN Trust Initiative, an industry group to promote an accreditation program.

In May 2020, the company released a new protocol it developed for ExpressVPN called Lightway, designed to improve connectivity speeds and reduce power consumption. In October, Yale Privacy Lab founder Sean O'Brien joined the ExpressVPN Digital Security Lab to conduct original research in the areas of privacy and cybersecurity.

On April 28, 2022, Indian Computer Emergency Response Team (CERT-In) under the Ministry of Electronics and Information Technology issued a new directive that asked the VPN providers to collect and store user data for up to five years. In response to the new VPN rules that require private network providers to store user information, ExpressVPN announced it would move its India-based servers to Singapore and the UK.

In 2023, ExpressVPN launched its app for Apple TV.

=== Acquisition by Kape Technologies ===
On September 13, 2021, it was reported that ExpressVPN had been acquired by Kape Technologies, an LSE-listed digital privacy and security company. At the time of the acquisition, ExpressVPN reportedly had over 4 million active users. ExpressVPN announced in September 2021 that it would remain a separate service from existing Kape brands.

In May 2023, Kape Technologies was delisted from the LSE in a transaction by Unikmind Holdings Limited, a company owned by the Israeli and Cypriot businessman Teddy Sagi.

=== Daniel Gericke charges ===
In September 2021, ExpressVPN CIO Daniel Gericke paid a $335,000 fine for previously carrying out hacking operations on behalf of the U.A.E. government without having a valid export license from the US government.

=== DNS request leaks ===
In February 2024, it was revealed that ExpressVPN software had contained a bug for nearly two years that exposed the domains users were visiting. The bug was present in Windows versions published between May 19, 2022, and February 7, 2024, affecting those who were using the split tunneling feature.

== Features ==
ExpressVPN has released apps for Windows, macOS, iOS, Android, Linux, and routers. The apps use a 4096-bit CA, AES-256-CBC encryption, and TLSv1.2 to secure user traffic. Available VPN protocols include Lightway, WireGuard, OpenVPN (with TCP/UDP), SSTP, L2TP/IPSec, and PPTP.

The software also features a Smart DNS feature called MediaStreamer, to add VPN capabilities to devices that do not support them, and a router app, allowing the VPN to be set up on a router, bypassing unsupported devices such as gaming consoles.

ExpressVPN is incorporated in the British Virgin Islands, a country that has no data retention laws, and is a separate legal jurisdiction to the United Kingdom.

ExpressVPN's parent company also develops leak testing tools, which enable users to determine if their VPN provider is leaking network traffic, DNS, or true IP addresses while connected to the VPN, such as when switching from a wireless to a wired internet connection.

In December 2021, ExpressVPN modified its product to protect against Log4Shell, updating its VPN to automatically block all outgoing traffic on ports used by LDAP.

In January 2022, ExpressVPN launched Parallel Connections, a backend feature which simultaneously runs multiple methods of connecting a user to a given server, automatically picking the one that connects a user first.

=== TrustedServer ===
In April 2019, ExpressVPN announced that all their VPN servers ran solely on random-access memory (RAM), without the need of hard disk drives. In theory, as soon as a computer is shut down, all information on the server vanishes and cannot be recovered; the next time the server reboots, a fresh version of the VPN infrastructure is spawned. This was the first example in the VPN industry for such a server security setup, and was referred to as TrustedServer.

In February 2022, ExpressVPN announced a $100,000 bug bounty for anyone who was able to hack its in-house technology, TrustedServer.

As of August 2022, ExpressVPN's server network covered 94 countries.

=== Lightway protocol ===
Lightway is ExpressVPN's open source VPN protocol. Launched in 2020, it is similar to the WireGuard protocol, but uses the wolfSSL library to improve speed on embedded devices such as routers and smartphones. It does not run in the operating system's kernel, but is lightweight to support auditing. In 2021, as the protocol was leaving the beta phase, the company claimed it was at least 2.5% faster than OpenVPN and other older protocols, improved reliability by 40%, and supported TCP and UDP.

In August 2021, ExpressVPN announced the full public release of Lightway as well as full open-sourcing of Lightway's code.

== Research ==
In 2020, ExpressVPN announced its new digital security research initiative Digital Security Lab, which investigates digital rights and security issues while educating consumers.

In 2021, Digital Security Lab released a new report that examined data collection practices in apps for opioid addiction and recovery. Research found that the large majority of all these apps provided third parties, including Facebook, Stripe, Inc., and Google, access to user data. In a similar 2021 study, Digital Security Lab analyzed 450 apps and found that all the studied apps contained questionable location trackers.

== See also ==
- Comparison of virtual private network services
