= Pheed =

Pay-per-view social media platform

- Website type: Social networking
- Owner: Pheed Limited
- Website: www.pheed.com
- Users: 8 million
- Launched: November 2012

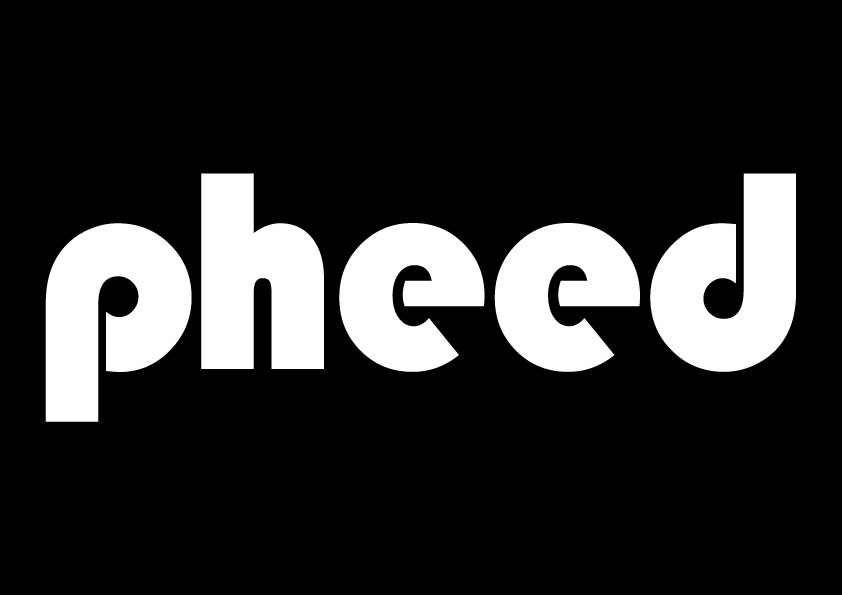

Pheed was a mobile pay-per-view technology and social networking service founded by O.D. Kobo, Tony DeNiro, and Phil Haus. In March 2014, 18 months from launch, a subsidiary of América Móvil acquired the service for $40 million in cash and stock.

== History ==
Pheed began development in Los Angeles as a web platform by Internet entrepreneur Phil Haus and music producer Tony DeNiro. Realizing that mobile was the future of social media, Haus and DeNiro refocused their service to a mobile app, introducing at the time the first pay-per-view live stream technology at the App Store. Pheed launched in November 2012 and was aimed at a creative and younger audience than Facebook's demographic. Pheed combined text, video, images and audio, and included a live broadcast option. Pheed was the first app on the App Store to offer pay-per-view live streaming, covering both individual elements (such as a video or audio event), or subscriptions to a full feed that can be scheduled for a specific time or day with a specific cost, and mobile applications through the Apple App Store and Google Play. The Pheeds could also be shared by Twitter, Facebook, and Gmail, and could be copyrighted, making them the user's property. They could also be kept on the user's wall without any other users seeing it. A user's friends could be invited through Facebook, Twitter, or Gmail.

== Acquisition ==
Pheed was acquired by Móvil Media a subsidiary of América Móvil, companies majority owned by Carlos Slim Helú, in March 2014 for $40 million. In April 2016, Pheed was shut down and the technology integrated to América Móvil platforms.
