= Miri Bohadana =

Israeli actress, model and presenter

Miri Bohadana מירי בוהדנה
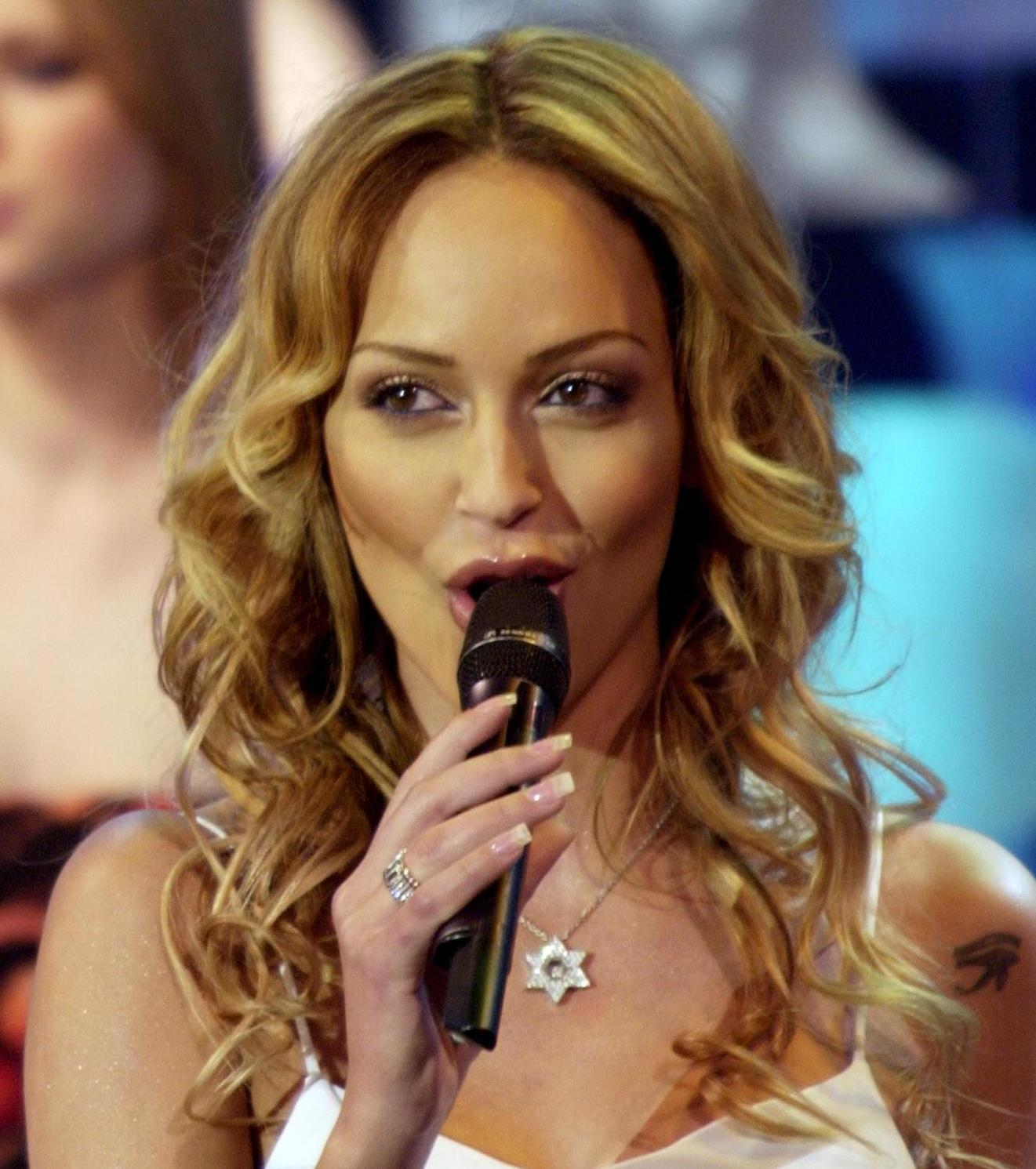
- Born: October 12, 1977 (age 48); Sderot, Israel
- Spouse: Zari Kovo
- Modeling information
- Height: 1.75 m (5 ft 9 in)
- Hair color: Brown
- Eye color: Brown
- Agency: "Look Models"

Miri Bohadana (Hebrew: מירי בוהדנה; born October 12, 1977) is an Israeli actress, model, TV host and beauty pageant titleholder who was crowned Miss Israel 1995.

== Biography ==
Miriam (Miri) Bohadana was born in Beersheba, Israel, to Moroccan-Jewish parents and raised in the town of Sderot. On May 8, 2007, Bohadana delivered her firstborn son, Ben, and girl, Esti. In 2011 she became pregnant again.

== Modeling career ==
She took part in the "Miss Beer Sheva" contest at age 15. Two years later, in 1995, Bohadana was chosen first runner up in the Miss Israel contest. She proceeded to the Miss World 1995 contest in South Africa, in which she was elected third runner up.

Bohadana resumed her modeling career in fashion shows, catalogues and commercials in Israel and abroad. Among other things, she worked for Pierre Cardin and Ferrero Rocher. She led the campaign of the "TNT" fashion company.

== Film and television career ==
Her first filmography experience was in the movie "Eskimo Limon 2000", which was also her first topless performance on film (she admitted of having breast implants). Since then Bohadana has presented and participated in many TV shows. In April 2003 she presented a show called "Good Girls" with fellow model and friend Ilanit Levy.

During 2006, Bohadana co-starred with Meir Suissa in an Israeli television mockumentary series about his life. In the show, as well as in real life, she was his co-star in a theater play. In the show, it made them close friends. The show was called "Karov L'Vadai" (English: "Almost Certainly") and aired on Channel 10.

== See also ==
- Look (modeling agency)
- Israeli fashion
