= MP3Concept =

2004 computer malware concept

Malware details
- Aliases: MAC.Amphimix, MP3Virus.Gen [Intego], MAC_MP3CONCEPT.A [Trend]
- Classification: Trojan horse (benign)

MP3Concept is the first trojan horse for Mac OS X, created around April 2004. MP3Concept is benign, it was designed as a proof of concept regarding how a file can be disguised to an end user in a GUI environment on Mac OS X. It is an application bundle that looks like an MP3 file. When launched, it plays a clip of a man laughing. Since its creation Apple has added additional verifications to the Finder to prevent such an attack. Antivirus software also now looks for its characteristics as well.
