= O. D. Kobo =

Israeli businessman

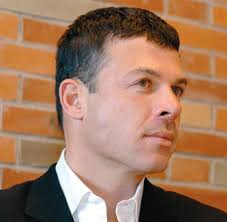
- Born: Oded David Kobo; August 30, 1975 (age 51); Hong Kong
- Citizenship: United Kingdom, Israel
- Education: London School of Economics (did not graduate)
- Spouse: Etos Ovadia
- Children: 3
- Parents: Eliezer "Bebo" Kobo; Ruth Kobo

Oded David Kobo (Hebrew: קובו עודד; born August 30, 1975), better known as O. D. Kobo, is a British and Israeli businessman in the technology sector.

As of 2023, The Sunday Times Rich List estimates Kobo's net worth to be £225 million.

== Early life and education ==
Kobo was born in Hong Kong to a Jewish family, the son of Bebo and Ruth Kobo. He attended the Hong Kong International School and then moved to United Kingdom where he attended Regents Business School London and later the London School of Economics for finance and business administration.

== Career ==
Kobo's business interests have ranged from technology to property to private equity with nearly US$1 billion in exits.

Kobo started his career at the age of twenty-one by licensing patented technology to the online lottery industry with e-Lottery (once the domain holder of Lottery.com). He later established several China based investment firms namely KGIM and SinoSheen of which both were partnered with the prime minister of Qatar Hamad bin Jassim bin Jaber Al Thani. KGIM was acquired in 2010 for US$120 million by East River Capital (a subsidiary of the Qatar Investment Authority) and SinoSheen had invested in companies such as Tencent, Netease and Alibaba pre-IPO before it was too acquired in 2011 for US$52 million.

In 2008, Kobo co-founded PIR Equities with childhood friend Joseph Aaron Horowitz, an employee owned private equity firm. According to Globes, the firm raised US$980 million that year to pursue value based investments within the financial services, technology and real estate industries.

In 2014, Camden Market Holdings the proprietor of landmark properties such as the Camden Market, Stables Market and Camden Lock Developments in Camden, London was acquired for $680 million by billionaire businessman Teddy Sagi of Playtech. Kobo invested in Camden Market Holdings via PIR Equites and was a member of the board of directors alongside Bebo Kobo, Richard Caring and Chelsfield Partners.

Also in 2014, Kobo sold Pheed - a mobile pay-per-view technology to Carlos Slim and American Movil for US$40 million.

In 2015, Kobo established S Group, with business partners Roman Abramovich and Gee Roberson, the former chairman of Geffen Records. In 2016, it was reported first in the Huffington Post that two properties from their portfolio had been sold to a consortium of Chinese investors led by Ding Lei for US$32 million. Kobo had invested $40 million in various technology projects in 2017 and in January 2018 it was reported to have been acquired and relocated to Hong Kong.

Kobo had led several failed attempts to purchase MTV Networks from National Amusements in 2008, as well as an attempt to purchase Golan Telecom in Israel in 2016, which was highly criticized by the press and caused a public backlash resulting in Kobo withdrawing his IPO on the TASE.

In August 2018, it was reported in the Financial Times that Kobo had led a $50 million investment in Bitcoin and Ethereum via PIR Equities. On February 5, 2019, PIR Equities completed a US$312 million capital raise for its third flagship fund. The firm's prior funds had net internal rates of return (IRR) — a key benchmark for investment returns — ranging from 24% to 33%.

In March 2019, Kobo introduced Israel Infrastructure Partners (IIP), a private equity firm focused on infrastructure investments, with the launch of a $350 million debut fund, IIP I. In June 2019, the firm, after changing its name to Israel Investment Partners, announced that it had raised the limit of the debut fund to $500 million.

In November 2021, Entrepreneur Magazine listed Kobo at number 47 on their ‘Top 50 Richest People in Crypto’ with an estimated net worth of $200 million. Kobo continues to invest in digital assets, with investments in Ethereum and various altcoins.

== Wealth ==
According to the Sunday Times Rich List in 2019, Kobo's net worth is estimated to be £75 million. In November 2021, Entrepreneur Magazine ranked Kobo amongst the world's top 50 richest in blockchain with an estimated net worth of $200 million. As of 2023, The Sunday Times Rich List estimates Kobo's net worth to be £225 million.

== Personal life ==
In 2015, Kobo married long-time girlfriend fashion photographer Etos Ovadia; they have two children.
