= Teddy Sagi =

Israeli businessman

- טדי שגיא
- Born: November 14, 1971 (age 54); Tel Aviv, Israel
- Occupation: Businessman
- Known for: Founder of Playtech; Founder of SafeCharge International; Founder of Pay.com
- Partner: Yael Nizri (2010—present)
- Children: 7

Teddy Sagi (Hebrew: טדי שגיא; born November 14, 1971) is an Israeli billionaire businessman based in London and Dubai. Sagi is the founder of the gambling software company Playtech and owner of London's Camden Market and cybersecurity company Kape Technologies. His personal wealth is estimated by Forbes at US$7.1 billion as of June 2026, with interests in real estate, gambling software, payments processing, and digital advertising.

== Personal life ==
Sagi was born in 1971 in Tel Aviv Israel, the only child of Ami Sagi, a businessman who owned a travel agency, and his wife Lizi, a cosmetician who sold make-up. He grew up in Tel Aviv's Shikun Lamed neighborhood.

In 1996, he was convicted in Israel for fraud and bribery, and was sentenced to nine months in prison, but was released after serving five months.

In 2009 Sagi obtained Cypriot citizenship as part of a 'golden visa' scheme by Cyprus government. As Cyprus is part of the European Union, Sagi obtained a Passport of the European Union. In 2013, The Guardian reported that Sagi had "been based in Cyprus for some years". In March 2021, it was reported that Sagi was saved from an assassination attempt in Cyprus, after being warned by the local authorities. Following the incident he immediately left Cyprus.

Sagi has a daughter with his former partner, Limor Bahat-Simanovich. Since 2010, Sagi has been living with Yael Nizri, the 2006 Miss Israel, and they have six children together. Sagi owns the most expensive home in Israel, located in Herzliya. The home, which he bought in 2010, lies in the wealthy neighborhood of Herzliya Pituah on Galei Techelet Street, Israel's most expensive street. It is a 2,000 square meter house on a half-acre lot on the shore, and has a fitness room, wine cellar, sealed room, and an elevator to the beach. Sagi also owns two penthouses in Herzliya, and other homes in Tel Aviv (including an apartment in the Tzameret Towers purchased from former Israeli Prime Minister Ehud Barak), London's Knightsbridge, Cyprus, and as of 2021 Dubai.

== Career ==
=== Playtech ===
Sagi founded Playtech in 1999. It was floated in 2006 on the London Stock Exchange at a price that valued the business at approximately £550 million. He has since scaled down his holdings to 4.6%, as opposed to 81% at the time of its IPO. He has since invested in hi-tech companies and real estate.

=== SafeCharge ===
Sagi was majority shareholder (with 68% control) of the company, which is a credit card clearing company for the online gambling industry.

Primarily based in Bulgaria, SafeCharge was traded on London's AIM, with a market cap of £385 million. The company was listed on the Alternative Investment Market (AIM) of the London Stock Exchange.

In 2019, Nuvei Corporation announced its acquisition of SafeCharge, and agreed to pay $889 million in cash for it. In August 2019, Nuvei completed the acquisition.

=== Stucco Media ===
In 2015 Sagi acquired the start-up company Stucco Media for $43 million. The acquisition was made by Market Tech, and the company is now owned by him. Stucco Media develops eCommerce website technology.

=== Glispa ===
Also in 2015, Sagi acquired the German start-up for €32 million. Glispa is an advertising company, mainly via mobile phones.

=== Mobfox ===
In November 2018, Sagi acquired the mobile advertising company Mobfox from Matomy Media for $7.5 million.

=== Winvia ===
In November 2025, Sagi floated his Winvia Entertainment PLC, a lottery and gaming operator in the UK and Romania, on London's AIM. The company raised £40 million in a placing with institutional investors, on a £205 million valuation.

=== Kape Technologies ===
In December 2012, Sagi acquired Israeli software company Crossrider in 2012. Crossrider was renamed Kape Technologies in March 2018.

=== Camden Market ===
Camden Market Holdings, the owner of Camden Market, Stables Market and Camden Lock Developments was bought by Sagi in March 2014 for £490 million from Bebo Kobo (50% owner), Richard Caring (20.6% owner), Elliott Bernerd via Chelsfield (20.6% owner), and O.D. Kobo (8.8% owner) via PIR Equities, which later turned out to be the biggest LSE IPO of 2015. Sagi has continued to buy property in the Camden Market area and as of March 2015, owns the four most important of the six sections of the market, London's second most popular tourist attraction after Buckingham Palace.

In July 2017 Sagi has completed delisting Market Tech from the LSE, at a value of 1.1Bn ILS.

Sagi intends to invest £300 million in developing the market area by 2018.

=== Other real estate ventures ===
In June 2017 Sagi acquired 44% of Brack Capital Properties N.V, which is a listed real estate company, owning and developing residential and commercial properties in Germany.

Sagi is also reported to enter the co-working share workspace sector with an international brand LABS. The first location is slated to open in London.

In August 2015, The GoodVision Trust (beneficiary Teddy Sagi) sold a 24.79% stake of Austrian real-estate company conwert Immobilien Invest SE to the German real-estate company Adler Real Estate AG. The market value of these shares was 250 million euros.

In March 2020, Labtech, the property investment firm owned by Teddy Sagi, completed the sale of Holborn Links Estate for 245 million euros to investors Tristan Capital Partners and Cording Real Estate Group.

== Wealth ==
According to Forbes, Sagi has a net worth of $7.1 billion, and is the fourth-richest person in Israel.

He was one of 565 Israelis listed in the Pandora Papers, published by the International Consortium of Investigative Journalists, according to Shomrim, an Israeli investigative journalism nonprofit organization that took part in the investigation.

Globe Invest is Sagi's family office, managing investments on behalf of Sagi and acting as a holding company for his investments.

In May 2025, the Sunday Times Rich List estimated his net worth to be £5 billion.
