= Leap (computer worm) =

MacOS computer worm

Oompa-Loompa

Malware details
- Technical name: Leap.A
- Alias: OSX/Oomp-A (Intego)
- Type: Worm
- Subtype: Malware
- Classification: Unknown
- Origin: [Unknown]

The Oompa-Loompa malware, also called OSX/Oomp-A or Leap.A, is an application-infecting, LAN-spreading worm for Mac OS X, discovered by the Apple security firm Intego on February 14, 2006. Leap cannot spread over the Internet, and can only spread over a local area network reachable using the Bonjour protocol. On most networks this limits it to a single IP subnet.

== Delivery and infection ==
The Leap worm is delivered over the iChat instant messaging program as a gzip-compressed tar file called latestpics.tgz. For the worm to take effect, the user must manually invoke it by opening the tar file and then running the disguised executable within.

The executable is disguised with the standard icon of an image file, and claims to show a preview of Apple's next OS. Once it is run, the worm will attempt to infect the system.

For non-"admin" users, it will prompt for the computer's administrator password in order to gain the privilege to edit the system configuration. It doesn't infect applications on disk, but rather when they are loaded, by using a system facility called "apphook".

Leap only infects Cocoa applications, and it does not infect applications owned by the system (including the apps that come pre-installed on a new machine), but only apps owned by the user who is currently logged in. Typically, that means apps that the current user has installed by drag-and-drop, rather than by Apple's installer system. When an infected app is launched, Leap tries to infect the four most recently used applications. If those four don't meet the above criteria, then no further infection takes place at that time.

== Payload ==
Once activated, Leap then attempts to spread itself via the user's iChat Bonjour buddy list. It does not spread using the main iChat buddy list, nor over XMPP. (By default, iChat does not use Bonjour and thus cannot transmit this worm.)

Leap does not delete data, spy on the system, or take control of it, but it does have one harmful effect: due to a bug in the worm itself, an infected application will not launch. This is helpful in that it prevents people from continuing to launch the infected program.

== Protection and recovery ==
A common method of protecting against this type of Computer Worm is avoiding launching files from untrusted sources. An existing admin account can be "declawed" by unchecking the box "Allow this user to administer this computer." (At least one admin account must remain on the system in order to install software and change vital system settings, even if it is an account created solely for that purpose.)

Recovering after a Leap infection involves deleting the worm files and replacing infected applications with fresh copies. It does not require re-installing the OS, since system-owned applications are immune.
