= Intego =

American security software company

- Type: Privately held company
- Industry: Computer software Security software
- Founded: 1997 (Paris, France)
- Founder: Jean-Paul Florencio and Laurent Marteau
- Headquarters: Seattle (Washington); Austin (Texas); Paris (France); Nagano (Japan)
- Products: 8
- Owner: Kape Technologies / Unikmind Holdings Limited
- Parent: Kape Technologies / Unikmind Holdings Limited
- Website: www.intego.com

Intego is a Mac and Windows security software company founded in 1997 in France and a subsidiary of British-Israeli information security company Kape Technologies since 2018.

The company creates Internet security software for macOS and Windows, including: antivirus, firewall, anti-spam, backup software and data protection software.

Intego currently has offices in the U.S. in Seattle (Washington), and Austin (Texas), and international offices in Paris (France), and Nagano (Japan). All of Intego's products are universal binaries, and are supported in several languages: English, French, German, Japanese, and Spanish, and previously Italian.

== History ==
Co-founded by former CEO Laurent Marteau and Jean-Paul Florencio and based in Paris, France, Intego released its first antivirus product in 1997: Rival, an antivirus for Mac OS 8. Two years later in July 1999, Intego released NetBarrier, the first personal security software suite for Mac OS 8. Then in October 2000, Intego released its legacy antivirus software, VirusBarrier 1.0, for Mac OS 8 and Mac OS 9.

Intego launched The Mac Security Blog, a blog that covers Mac security news, Apple security updates, Mac malware alerts, as well as news and opinion pieces related to Apple products, in mid-2007. The company launched a podcast in October 2017, called the Intego Mac Podcast.

Intego released its current X9 version of antivirus and security software in June 2016, which has since had several under-the-hood updates, including compatibility with new macOS releases and Apple silicon processors.

Kape Technologies announced in July 2018 that it was acquiring Intego to "enhance Kape's arsenal of products in cyber protection".

Intego released a Windows version of its antivirus software in July 2020.

In 2021, Intego's launched Intego Privacy Protection, a VPN solution for macOS and Windows.

== See also ==
- Antivirus software
- Internet security
