= Amazon Elastic Compute Cloud =

Cloud computing platform

Amazon Elastic Compute Cloud (EC2)
- Amazon Elastic Compute Cloud (EC2)
- Original author: Amazon
- Developer: Amazon
- Release: August 25, 2006; 20 years ago (public beta)
- Operating system: Linux; Microsoft Windows; FreeBSD; macOS
- Available in: English
- Type: Virtual private server
- License: Proprietary software
- Website: aws.amazon.com/ec2/

Amazon Elastic Compute Cloud (EC2) is a part of Amazon's cloud-computing platform, Amazon Web Services (AWS), that allows users to rent virtual computers on which to run their own computer applications. EC2 encourages scalable deployment of applications by providing a web service through which a user can boot an Amazon Machine Image (AMI) to configure a virtual machine, which Amazon calls an "instance", containing any software desired. A user can create, launch, and terminate server-instances as needed, paying by the second for active servers – hence the term "elastic". EC2 provides users with control over the geographical location of instances that allows for latency optimization and high levels of redundancy. In November 2010, Amazon switched its own retail website platform to EC2 and AWS.

== History ==
Amazon announced a limited public beta test of EC2 on August 25, 2006, offering access on a first-come, first-served basis. Amazon added two new instance types (Large and Extra-Large) on October 16, 2007. On May 29, 2008, two more types were added, High-CPU Medium and High-CPU Extra Large. There were twelve types of instances available.

Amazon added three new features on March 27, 2008: static IP addresses, availability zones, and user-selectable kernels. On August 20, 2008, Amazon added Elastic Block Store (EBS). This provides persistent storage, a feature that had been lacking since the service was introduced.

Amazon EC2 went into full production when it dropped the beta label on October 23, 2008. On the same day, Amazon announced the following features:

- a service level agreement for EC2,
- Microsoft Windows in beta form on EC2,
- Microsoft SQL Server in beta form on EC2,
- plans for an AWS management console, and
- plans for load balancing, autoscaling, and cloud monitoring services.

These features were subsequently added on May 18, 2009.

Amazon EC2 was developed mostly by a team in Cape Town, South Africa led by Chris Pinkham. Pinkham provided the initial architecture guidance for EC2 and then built the team and led the development of the project along with Willem van Biljon.

== Instance types ==
Initially, EC2 used Xen virtualization exclusively. However, on November 6, 2017, Amazon announced the new C5 family of instances that were based on a custom architecture around the KVM hypervisor, called Nitro. Each virtual machine, called an "instance", functions as a virtual private server. Amazon sizes instances based on "Elastic Compute Units". The performance of otherwise identical virtual machines may vary. On November 28, 2017, AWS announced a bare-metal instance, a departure from exclusively offering virtualized instance types.

As of January 2019, the following instance types were offered:

- General Purpose: A1, T3, T2, M5, M5a, M4, T3a
- Compute Optimized: C5, C5n, C4
- Memory Optimized: R5, R5a, R4, X1e, X1, High Memory, z1d
- Accelerated Computing: P3, P2, G3, F1
- Storage Optimized: H1, I3, D2

As of April 2018, the following payment methods by instance were offered:

- On-demand: pay by the hour without commitment.
- Reserved: rent instances with one-time payment receiving discounts on the hourly charge.
- Spot: bid-based service: runs the jobs only if the spot price is below the bid specified by bidder. The spot price is claimed to be supply-demand based, however a 2011 study concluded that the price was generally not set to clear the market, but was dominated by an undisclosed reserve price.

In 2025, AWS expanded EC2 with the compute-optimized C8gn family, powered by Graviton4 and offering up to 600 Gbit/s network bandwidth (about 30% higher compute performance than C7gn), and introduced G6f fractional-GPU instances that let customers provision one-eighth, one-quarter, or one-half of an NVIDIA L4 GPU for right-sized graphics/ML workloads.

=== Cost ===
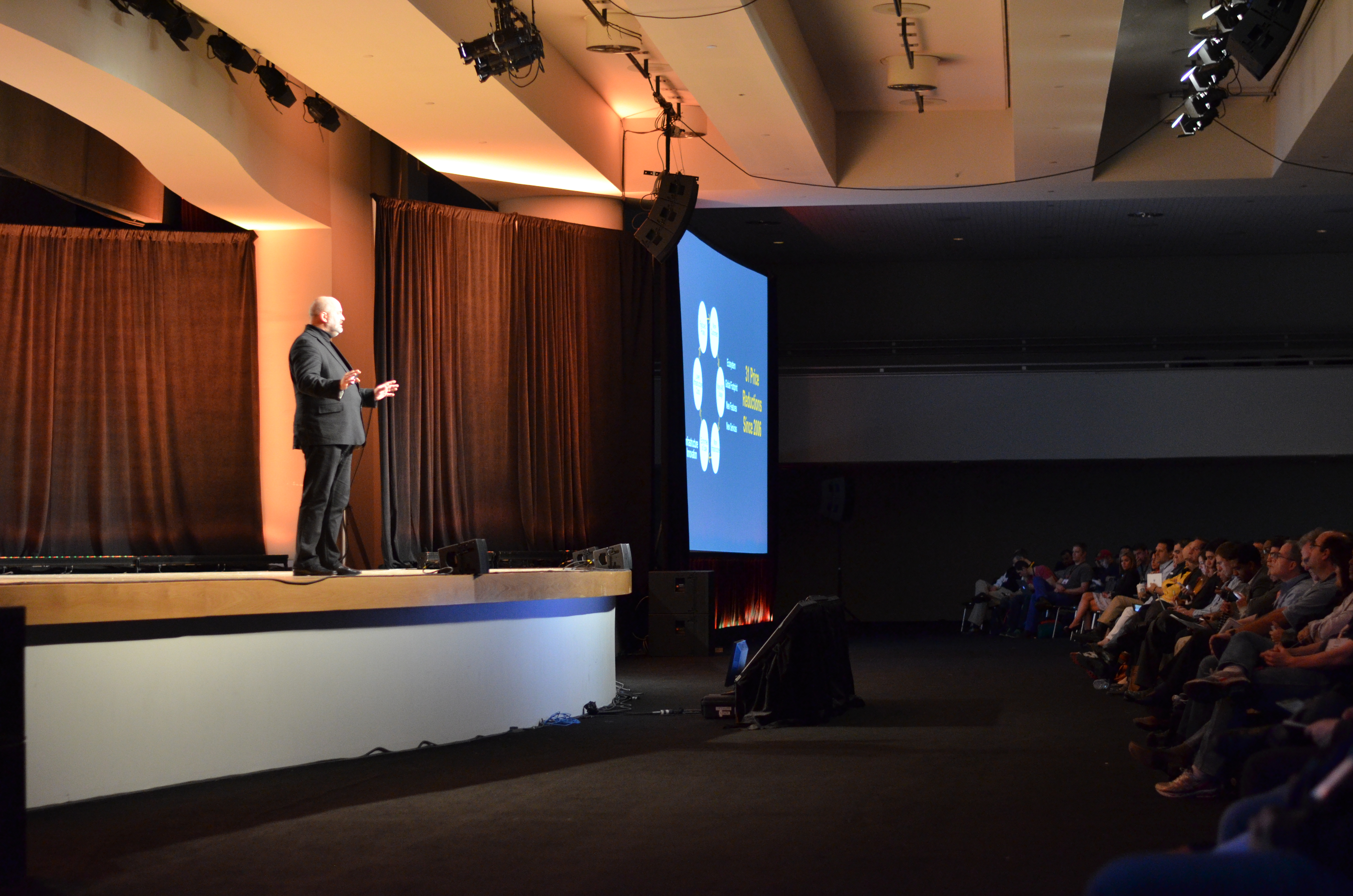
Amazon CTO Werner Vogels announcing price reductions at AWS Summit 2013 NYC

As of April 2018, Amazon charged about $0.0058 per hour ($4.176 per month) for the smallest "Nano Instance" (t2.nano) virtual machine running Linux or Windows. Storage-optimized instances cost as much as $4.992 per hour (i3.16xlarge). "Reserved" instances can go as low as $2.50 per month for a three-year prepaid plan. (Note: $109 for a three-year Heavy Utilization Reserved t2.micro Instances reservation amortized over thirty-six months plus one month at $0.002/hour.) The data transfer charge ranges from free to $0.12 per gigabyte, depending on the direction and monthly volume (inbound data transfer is free on all AWS services).

EC2 costs can be analyzed using the Amazon Cost and Usage Report. There are many different cost categories for EC2 including: hourly Instance Charges, Data Transfer, EBS Volumes, EBS Volume Snapshots, and Nat Gateway.

=== Free tier ===
As of December 2010 Amazon offered a bundle of free resource credits to new account holders. The credits are designed to run a "micro" sized server, storage (EBS), and bandwidth for one year. Unused credits cannot be carried over from one month to the next.

=== Reserved instances ===
Reserved instances enable EC2 or RDS service users to reserve an instance for one or three years. The corresponding hourly rate charged by Amazon to operate the instance is 35 to 75% lower than the rate charged for on-demand instances. Reserved instances can be purchased with three different payment options: All Upfront, Partial Upfront and No Upfront. The different purchase options allow for different structuring of payment models, with a larger discount given to customers that pay their reservation upfront.

Reserved Instances are purchased based on a resource commitment. These reservations are made based on an instance type and a count of that instance type. For example, you could reserve 100 i3.large instances for a 3-year term.

In September 2016, AWS announced several enhancements to Reserved instances, introducing a new feature called scope and a new reservation type called a Convertible. In October 2017, AWS announced the allowance to subdivide the instances purchased for more flexibility.

=== Spot instances ===
Cloud providers maintain large amounts of excess capacity they have to sell or risk incurring losses. Amazon EC2 Spot instances are spare compute capacity in the AWS cloud available at up to 90% discount compared to On-Demand prices. As a trade-off, AWS offers no SLA on these instances and customers take the risk that it can be interrupted with only two minutes of notification when Amazon needs the capacity back. Researchers from the Israeli Institute of Technology found that "they (Spot instances) are typically generated at random from within a tight price interval via a dynamic hidden reserve price". Some companies, like Spotinst, are using machine learning to predict spot interruptions up to 15 minutes in advance.

=== Savings Plans ===
In November 2019, Amazon announced Savings Plans. Savings Plans are an alternative to Reserved Instances that come in two different plan types: Compute Savings Plans and EC2 Instances Savings Plans. Compute Savings Plans allow an organization to commit to EC2 and Fargate usage with the freedom to change region, family, size, availability zone, OS and tenancy inside the lifespan of the commitment. EC2 Instance Savings plans provide a larger discount than Compute Savings Plans but are less flexible meaning a user must commit to individual instance families within a region to take advantage, but with the freedom to change instances within the family in that region.

AWS uses the Cost Explorer to automatically calculate recommendations for the commitments you should make how that commitment will look like as a monthly charge on your AWS bill. AWS Savings Plans are purchased based on hourly spend commitment. This hourly commitment is made using the discounted pricing of the savings plan you are purchasing. For example, you could commit to spending $5 per hour, on a Compute Savings Plan, for a 3-year term.

== Features ==
=== Operating systems ===
When it launched in August 2006, the EC2 service offered Linux and later Sun Microsystems' OpenSolaris and Solaris Express Community Edition. In October 2008, EC2 added the Windows Server 2003 and Windows Server 2008 operating systems to the list of available operating systems. In March 2011, NetBSD AMIs became available. In November 2012, Windows Server 2012 support was added.

Since 2006, Colin Percival, a FreeBSD developer and Security Officer, solicited Amazon to add FreeBSD. In November 2012, Amazon officially supported running FreeBSD in EC2. The FreeBSD/EC2 platform is maintained by Percival who also developed the secure deduplicating Amazon S3-cloud based backup service Tarsnap.

Amazon has their own Linux distribution based on Fedora and Red Hat Enterprise Linux as a low cost offering known as the Amazon Linux AMI. Version 2013.03 included: Linux kernel, Java OpenJDK Runtime Environment and GNU Compiler Collection.

On November 30, 2020, Amazon announced that it would be adding macOS to the EC2 service. Initial support was announced for macOS Mojave and macOS Catalina running on Mac Mini.

=== Managed Container and Kubernetes Services ===
Amazon Elastic Container Registry (ECR) is a Docker registry service for Amazon EC2 instances to access repositories and images.

Amazon Elastic Kubernetes Service (EKS) a managed Kubernetes service running on top of EC2 without needing to provision or manage instances.

=== Persistent storage ===
An EC2 instance may be launched with a choice of two types of storage for its boot disk or "root device". The first option is a local "instance-store" disk as a root device (originally the only choice). The second option is to use an EBS volume as a root device. Instance-store volumes are temporary storage, which survive rebooting an EC2 instance, but when the instance is stopped or terminated (e.g., by an API call, or due to a failure), this store is lost.

The Amazon Elastic Block Store (EBS) provides raw block devices that can be attached to Amazon EC2 instances. These block devices can then be used like any raw block device. In a typical use case, this would include formatting the device with a filesystem and mounting it. In addition, EBS supports a number of advanced storage features, including snapshotting and cloning. EBS volumes can be up to 16 TB in size. EBS volumes are built on replicated storage, so that the failure of a single component will not cause data loss. EBS was introduced to the general public by Amazon in August 2008.

Amazon EBS

EBS volumes provide persistent storage independent of the lifetime of the EC2 instance, and act much like hard drives on a real server. More accurately, they appear as block devices to the operating system that are backed by Amazon's disk arrays. The OS is free to use the device however it wants. In the most common case, a file system is loaded and the volume acts as a hard drive. Another possible use is the creation of RAID arrays by combining two or more EBS volumes. RAID allows increases of speed and/or reliability of EBS. Users can set up and manage storage volumes of sizes from 1 GB to 16 TB. The volumes support snapshots, which can be taken from a GUI tool or the API. EBS volumes can be attached or detached from instances while they are running, and moved from one instance to another.

Simple Storage Service (S3) is a storage system in which data is accessible to EC2 instances, or directly over the network to suitably authenticated callers (all communication is over HTTP). Amazon does not charge for the bandwidth for communications between EC2 instances and S3 storage "in the same region". Accessing S3 data stored in a different region (for example, data stored in Europe from a US East Coast EC2 instance) will be billed at Amazon's normal rates.

S3-based storage is priced per gigabyte per month. Applications access S3 through an API. For example, Apache Hadoop supports a special s3: filesystem to support reading from and writing to S3 storage during a MapReduce job. There are also S3 filesystems for Linux, which mount a remote S3 filestore on an EC2 image, as if it were local storage. As S3 is not a full POSIX filesystem, things may not behave the same as on a local disk (e.g., no locking support).

=== Elastic IP addresses ===
Amazon Elastic IP

Amazon's elastic IP address feature is similar to static IP address in traditional data centers, with one key difference. A user can programmatically map an elastic IP address to any virtual machine instance without a network administrator's help and without having to wait for DNS to propagate the binding. In this sense an Elastic IP Address belongs to the account and not to a virtual machine instance. It exists until it is explicitly removed, and remains associated with the account even while it is associated with no instance.

=== Amazon CloudWatch ===
Amazon CloudWatch

Amazon CloudWatch is a web service that provides real-time monitoring to Amazon's EC2 customers on their resource utilization such as CPU, disk, network and replica lag for RDS Database replicas. CloudWatch does not provide any memory, disk space, or load average metrics without running additional software on the instance. Since December 2017 Amazon provides a CloudWatch Agent for Windows and Linux operating systems included disk and previously not available memory information, previously Amazon provided example scripts for Linux instances to collect OS information. The data is aggregated and provided through AWS management console. It can also be accessed through command line tools and Web APIs, if the customer desires to monitor their EC2 resources through their enterprise monitoring software. Amazon provides an API which allows clients to operate on CloudWatch alarms.

The metrics collected by Amazon CloudWatch enables the auto-scaling feature to dynamically add or remove EC2 instances. The customers are charged by the number of monitoring instances.

Since May 2011, Amazon CloudWatch accepts custom metrics that can be submitted programmatically via Web Services API and then monitored the same way as all other internal metrics, including setting up the alarms for them, and since July 2014 Cloudwatch Logs service is also available.

Basic Amazon CloudWatch is included in Amazon Free Tier service.

=== Automated scaling ===
Auto-scaling

Amazon's auto-scaling feature of EC2 allows it to automatically adapt computing capacity to site traffic. The schedule-based (e.g. time-of-the-day) and rule-based (e.g. CPU utilization thresholds) auto scaling mechanisms are easy to use and efficient for simple applications. However, one potential problem is that VMs may take up to several minutes to be ready to use, which are not suitable for time critical applications. The VM startup time is dependent on image size, VM type, data center locations, etc. The convenience of using EC2 enables you to dynamically increase capacity in accordance with demand and access resources rapidly.

== Pricing ==
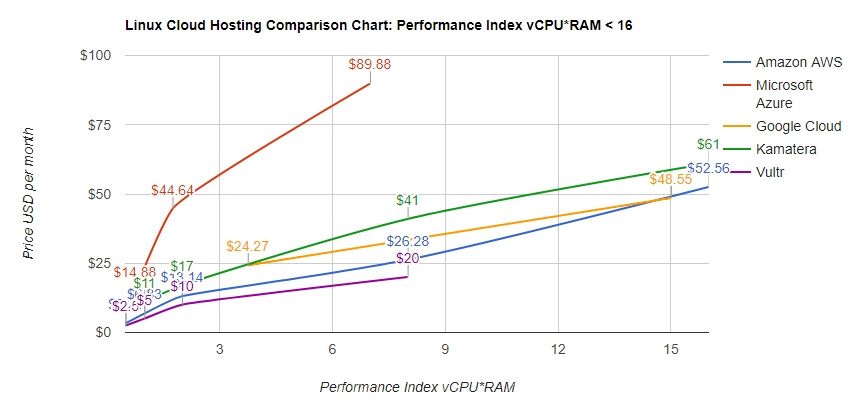
Linux cloud hosting: performance index below 16 ( < 2CPU, 8GB RAM)

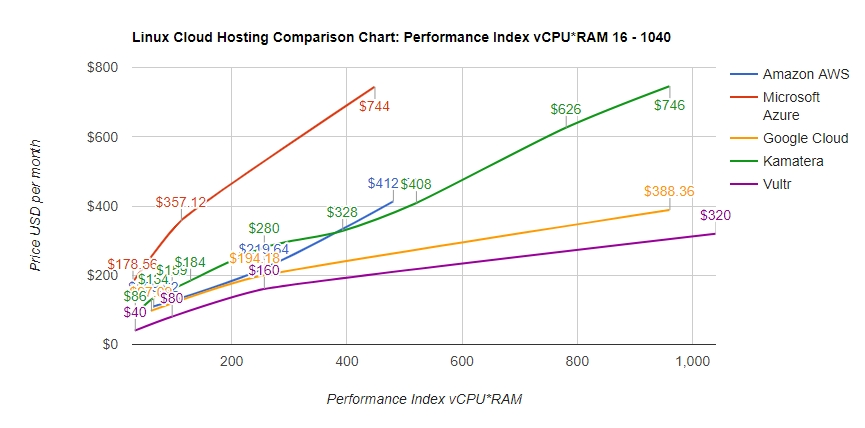
Linux cloud hosting: performance index 16 - 1040 (2CPU, 8GB RAM - 16CPU, 65GB RAM)

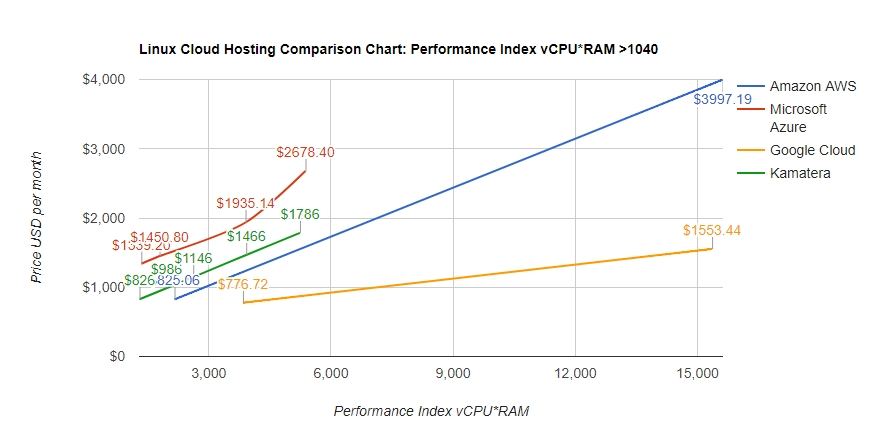
Linux cloud hosting: performance index ABOVE 1040 ( > 16CPU, 65GB RAM)

On Demand EC2 instances are priced per hour. An example of this pricing would be $0.096 per hour for a Linux, m5.large, EC2 instance in the us-east-1 region. Pricing will vary based on the instance type, region, and operating system of the instance. Public on-demand pricing for EC2 can be found on the AWS website.

The other pricing models for EC2 have different pricing models.

Spot instances also have a cost per instance hour, but the cost will change on a regular basis based on the supply of EC2 spot capacity.

Reserved Instances and Compute Savings plans are priced per hour. Each of these reservation tools has its own price per hour based on the payment option, term and reservation product being used. These prices are locked in for either a 1-year or 3-year term.

Amazon EC2 price varies from $2.5 per month for "nano" instance with 1 vCPU and 0.5 GB RAM on board to "xlarge" type of instances with 32 vCPU and 488 GB RAM billed up to $3997.19 per month.

The charts above show how Amazon EC2 pricing is compared to similar Cloud Computing services: Microsoft Azure, Google Cloud Platform, Kamatera, and Vultr.

Amazon EC2 compared to similar cloud computing services
	Amazon EC2	Microsoft Azure	Google Cloud Platform	Kamatera	Vultr
1vCPU 0.5 GB RAM	$3.29				$2.5
1vCPU 0.75 GB RAM		$14.88			
1vCPU 1 GB RAM	$6.83			$11	$5
1vCPU 1.75 GB RAM		$44.64			
1vCPU 2 GB RAM	$13.14			$17	$10
1vCPU 3.75 GB RAM			$24.27		
2vCPU 3.5 GB RAM		$89.88			
2vCPU 4 GB RAM				$41	$20
2vCPU 7.5 GB RAM			$48.55		
2vCPU 8 GB RAM	$52.56			$61	
4vCPU 7 GB RAM		$178.56			
4vCPU 8 GB RAM				$86	$40
4vCPU 15 GB RAM			$97.09		
4vCPU 15 GB RAM	$134			$134	
6vCPU 16 GB RAM				$159	$80
8vCPU 14 GB RAM		$357.12			
8vCPU 16 GB RAM				$184	
8vCPU 30 GB RAM			$194.18		
8vCPU 32 GB RAM	$219.64			$280	$160
8vCPU 49 GB RAM				$328	
8vCPU 56 GB RAM		$744			
16vCPU 32 GB RAM	$412.53				
8vCPU 65 GB RAM				$408	
12vCPU 65 GB RAM				$626	
16vCPU 32 GB RAM			$388.36	$746	
16vCPU 65 GB RAM					$320
20vCPU 65 GB RAM					$826
12vCPU 112 GB RAM		$1339.20			
16vCPU 112 GB RAM		$1450.80			
20vCPU 98 GB RAM					$986
36vCPU 60 GB RAM	$825.06				
20vCPU 131 GB RAM					$1146
32vCPU 120 GB RAM			$776.72		
16vCPU 224 GB RAM		$1935.1			
20vCPU 196 GB RAM					$1466
20vCPU 262 GB RAM					$1786
24vCPU 224 GB RAM		$2678.40			
64vCPU 240 GB RAM			$1553.44		
32vCPU 488 GB RAM	$3997.19				

== Reliability ==
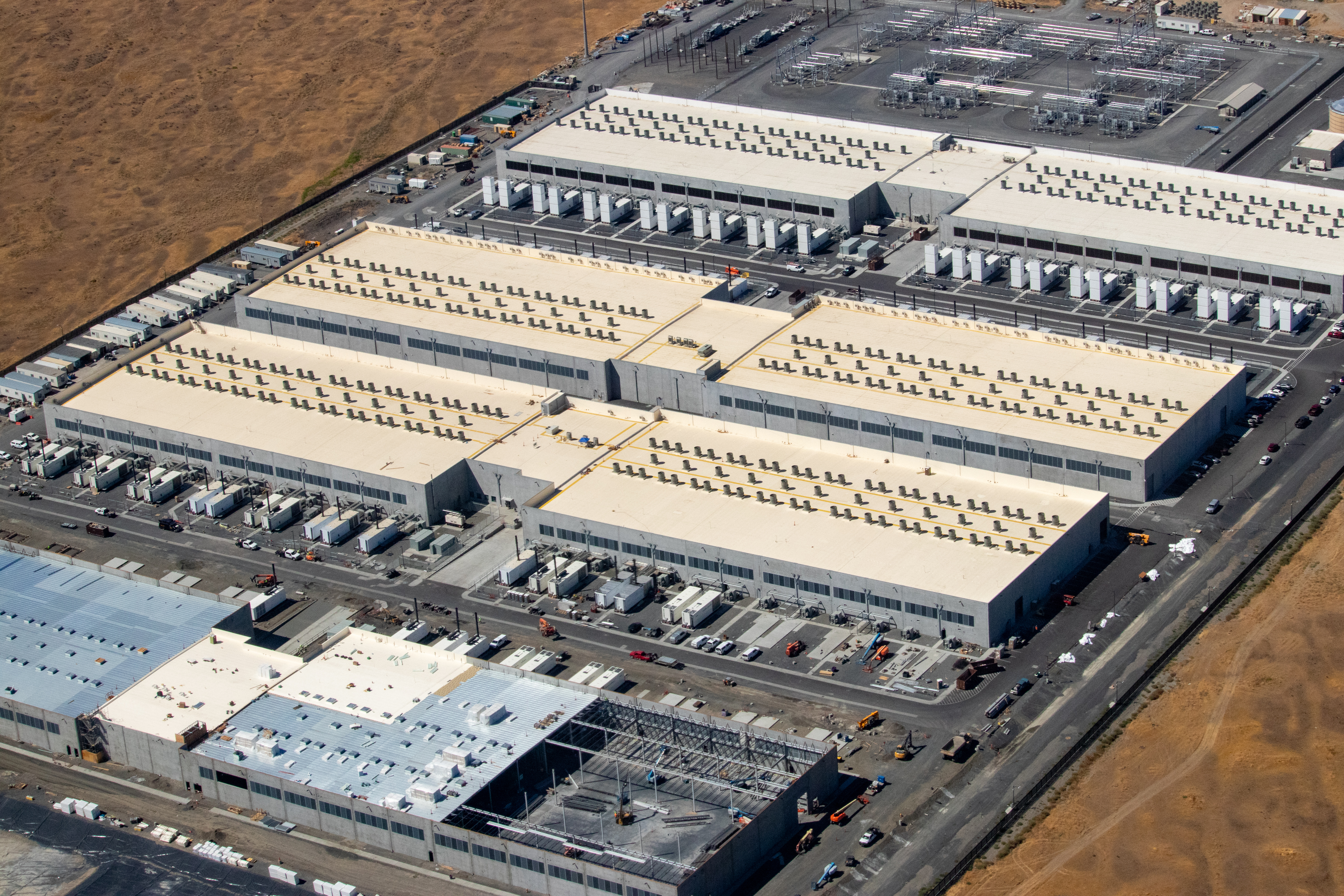
Part of an AZ in AWS's us-west-2 region, showing three datacenters with a fourth under construction

To make EC2 more fault-tolerant, Amazon engineered Availability Zones that are designed to be insulated from failures in other availability zones. Availability zones do not share the same infrastructure. Applications running in more than one availability zone can achieve higher availability.

EC2 provides users with control over the geographical location of instances that allows for latency optimization and high levels of redundancy. For example, to minimize downtime, a user can set up server instances in multiple zones that are insulated from each other for most causes of failure such that one backs up the other.

Higher-availability database services, like Amazon Relational Database Service run separately from EC2 instances.

== Issues ==
In early July 2008, the anti-spam organizations Outblaze and Spamhaus.org began blocking Amazon's EC2 address pool due to problems with the distribution of spam and malware.

On December 1, 2010, Amazon pulled its service to WikiLeaks after coming under political pressure in the US. Assange said that WikiLeaks chose Amazon knowing it would probably be kicked off the service "in order to separate rhetoric from reality". The Internet group Anonymous attempted to attack EC2 in revenge; however, Amazon was not affected by the attack.

Amazon's websites were temporarily offline on December 12, 2010, although it was initially unclear if this was due to attacks or a hardware failure. An Amazon official later stated that it was due to a hardware failure.

Shortly before 5 am ET on April 21, 2011, an outage started at EC2's Northern Virginia data center that brought down several websites, including Foursquare, Springpad, Reddit, Quora, and Hootsuite. Specifically, attempts to use Amazon's elastic-disk and database services hung, failed, or were slow. Service was restored to some parts of the data center (three of four "availability zones" in Amazon's terms) by late afternoon Eastern time that day; problems for at least some customers were continuing as of April 25. 0.07% of EBS volumes in one zone have also been lost; EBS failures were a part of normal operation even before this outage and were a risk documented by Amazon, though the number of failures and the number of simultaneous failures may find some EC2 users unprepared.

On Sunday August 6, 2011, Amazon suffered a power outage in one of their Ireland availability zones. Lightning was originally blamed for the outage; however, on August 11, Irish energy supplier ESB Networks dismissed this as a cause, but at time of writing, could not confirm what the cause of the problem was. The power outage raised multiple questions regarding Amazon's EBS infrastructure, which caused several bugs in their software to be exposed. The bugs resulted in some customers' data being deleted when recovering EBS volumes in a mid-write operation during the crash.

August 8, 2011, saw another network connectivity outage of Amazon's Northern Virginia data center, knocking out the likes of Reddit, Quora, Netflix and FourSquare. The outage lasted around 25 minutes.

Another Northern Virginia data center outage occurred on October 22, 2012, from approximately 10 am to 4 pm PT. Edmodo, Airbnb, Flipboard, Reddit, and other customers were affected. Anonymous claimed responsibility, but Amazon denied this assertion.

== See also ==
- Amazon Virtual Private Cloud
- Alibaba Cloud
- AppScale
- Bitnami
- CopperEgg
- ElasticHosts
- Eucalyptus (software)
- FlexiScale
- FUJITSU Cloud IaaS Trusted Public S5
- GoGrid
- Google App Engine
- Google Cloud Platform
- GreenQloud
- Internap
- Linode
- Lunacloud
- Microsoft Azure
- Nimbula
- OpenShift
- Oracle Cloud
- OrionVM
- OVHcloud
- Rackspace Cloud
- RightScale
- Savvis
- TurnKey Linux Virtual Appliance Library
- Zadara
