= PaaSage =

PaaSage is a project partially funded by the Seventh Framework Programme for Research and Technological Development, sometimes abbreviated to FP7. PaaSage is a European Union funded research project involving partners such as ERCIM, SINTEF, STFC, University of Stuttgart, INRIA, CETIC, FORTH, BE.WAN, EVRY, Sysfera, Flexiant, Lufthansa Systems, GWDG, ASCS, University of Ulm, University of Oslo, AGH, IBSAC and University of Cyprus that aims at creating a development and deployment platform together with an appropriate methodology for helping software engineers creating new applications and migrating old applications that can run on multiple Cloud platforms. PaaSage is a notable example of European research efforts in the field of Infrastructure as a Service (IaaS).

== Summary ==
PaaSage is a development and deployment platform, with an accompanying methodology, with which developers of enterprise systems can access services of cloud platforms in a technology neutral approach that abstracts the technical details while guiding them to configure their applications for best performance.

== Background ==
Conducting European research policies and implementing European research programmes is an obligation under the Amsterdam Treaty.

It has been suggested that the contribution of €7 billion/year in European research funding in 2006 might help generate an increase in GDP of some €200 billion/year by the 2030s.

There exist several open source and commercial offerings at the Infrastructure as a Service (IaaS) level. The open source Cloud technologies include OpenStack, Eucalyptus (software), OpenNebula and Apache CloudStack. Notable commercial offerings include Windows Azure, Amazon Elastic Compute Cloud, HP Cloud, Flexiant Flexiscale among others. Software developers targeting the Cloud may wish to reduce costs by developing their software once and deploy it on several of the available offerings, gaining the benefit of a competitive Cloud market without losing on performance, availability, or any other service properties.

Currently an impediment to this objective is that IaaS Cloud platforms are heterogeneous, and the services and Application Programmer Interfaces (APIs) that they provide are not standardised. These platforms even tend to impose a specific architecture on deployed applications. Accordingly, there is a significant dependency between client applications and the services provided by the platform, which is not well specified or appropriately communicated to the user. Knowledge with respect to which use case is most suited for which platform and how to exploit these features is therefore hard and costly to gain.

== Objective ==
PaaSage aims to create a flexible model to allow software developers wider access to cloud platforms and in particular allow European companies to positively affect their position.

From a research perspective PaaSage is seeking to leverage the situation with applications today essentially consisting of different logical units, or modules, and that development models like workflow-based composition, model-based application development, object-oriented programming, etc. exhibit different characteristics and requirements towards the infrastructure such as:

- Different dependencies with one another, with data, the user etc.
- Different quality requirements regarding these dependencies like interactivity, real-time response, bandwidth for communication etc.
- Different scalability behaviour under increasing load, i.e. growing number of users, requests etc.

These characteristics would then be used to define the deployment model and the execution behaviour, e.g. to exploit implicit concurrency or to provide the appropriate communication infrastructure. More importantly, however, this also gives insight into the degree of scalability, the potential distributions, and the way the whole application behaves under given conditions of horizontal and vertical scale.

Issues such as Scalability are generally considered to be vital in developing next generation HPC, mission-critical and resource demanding products. Research in this area is of great interest to industrial parties such as Lufthansa and Flexiant who are engaged in the PaaSage project. In PaaSage, industrial and academic partners work in close collaboration with Cloud provider partners to research, develop and deploy resource intensive applications which benefit greatly from model based management and leverages scalability according to custom requirements.

In June 2015, PaaSage announced a partnership with the OW2 Consortium, and in September 2015, the first version of the PaaSage product was released and the source code is available through the OW2 Community forge.
