= Jungle Disk =

Online backup software service

- Developers: Jungle Disk, LLC
- Release: 2007
- Operating system: Windows / macOS / Linux
- Available in: English
- Type: Remote backup service
- License: Proprietary
- Website: www.jungledisk.com

Jungle Disk is both the name of an online backup software service and a privately held data security company. It was one of the first backup services to use cloud storage and Amazon S3. In 2009 after being acquired by Rackspace the service added Rackspace Cloud Files. The name is a word association as the Amazon rainforest is a Jungle and Disk is a common shorthand for a hard disk drive.

In 2022, Jungle Disk (the company) rebranded as CyberFortress.

== Backup service overview ==
Jungle Disk backup is a monthly subscription software service that supports laptops, desktops, and servers for Microsoft Windows, macOS, and Linux operating systems. Data is backed up to an online disk using either continuous backup (a.k.a. sync) or scheduled backups of selected files, folders, or the entire system. Data can be accessed through the software client, a web browser, or mobile devices running Android or iOS. The service also provides a WebDAV server for integration with other applications. Customers can protect their data using AES-256 encryption with their own key so even Jungle Disk employees cannot access any records. Each subscription includes 10 gigabytes of storage, with additional data available on a pay-as-you-go basis.

== History ==
Jungle Disk was founded in Atlanta by Dave Wright in 2006. On October 22, 2008, Jungle Disk entered into an agreement to be acquired by Rackspace Hosting, Inc. Rackspace purchased Jungle Disk in order to expand their cloud hosting services. After the acquisition integration Dave left Rackspace to found SolidFire and then Jungle Disk was relocated to San Antonio in 2010. The pace of development slowed down as Rackspace focused on its Cloud infrastructure software platform which became OpenStack. In 2013, Rackspace revived Jungle Disk customer support going from ticket only service to include phone, chat and ticketing. On January 5, 2016, Jungle Disk spun out of Rackspace US, Inc. and is now a privately held company headquartered in San Antonio, TX.

On December 5, 2017, Jungle Disk announced it acquired SafetyNet, the first backup for QuickBooks Online, from Jobber.

In May 2022, it acquired online backup company ElephantDrive.

Later in 2022, Jungle Disk (the company) rebranded as CyberFortress.

== Criticism ==
The Jungle Disk client software did not receive an update from 2012 to 2014 and then while part of the Cloud Office portfolio a new version was released in December 2015.

On June 3, 2011, Colin Percival, owner of Tarsnap (a competitor of Jungle Disk), identified two potential weaknesses in Jungle Disk's security:

- The lack of a Message Authentication Code means that file corruption (accidental or deliberate) or arbitrary file content insertions will not be detected if the attacker can bypass Amazon or Rackspace security and directly modify data in S3 or Cloud Files.
- The use of MD5 as a Key derivation function makes it computationally feasible to perform a brute-force attack on a Jungle Disk password.

== See also ==
- List of online backup services
- Comparison of online backup services
