= Delta update =

Update that only requires the user to download changed code

A delta update is a software update that requires the user to download only those parts of the software's code that are new, or have been changed from their previous state, in contrast to having to download the entire program. The use of delta updates can save significant amounts of time and computing bandwidth. The name "delta" derives from the mathematical science use of the Greek letter delta, Δ or δ to denote change.

Another name for the underlying technology is binary delta compression. In any case, the combination of the old version and the downloaded delta is used to reconstruct the new version. For information on the technology used to produce the differences, see data differencing.

== Uses ==
=== Linux ===
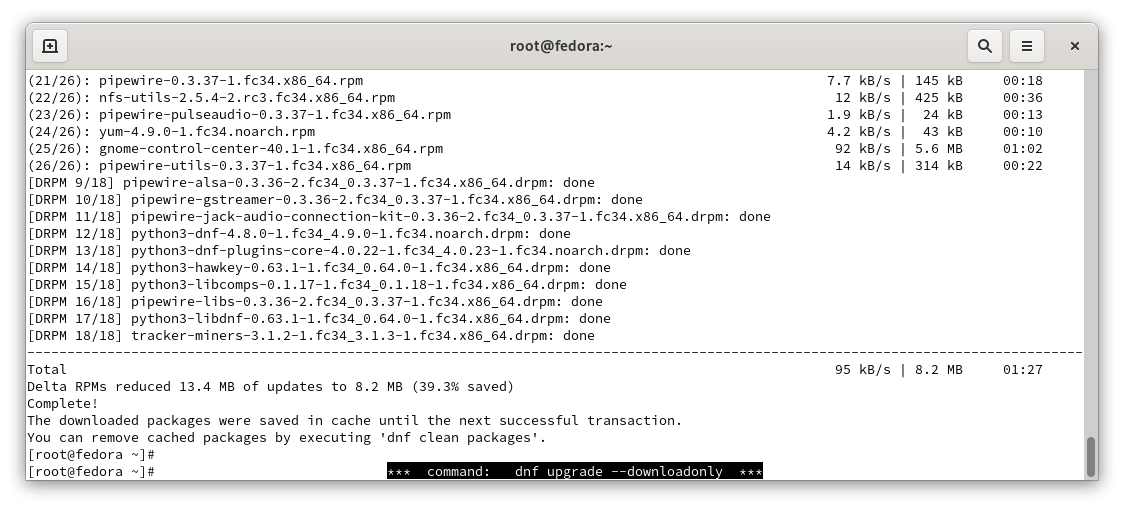
Delta update in Fedora Linux

Fedora Linux has supported binary delta updates by default using the yum presto plugin since June 2009. This is based on RPM Package Manager's deltarpm system (2004), which was in turn based on bsdiff. This functionality has been inherited by Fedora-derived operating systems, including RedHat Enterprise Linux and its variant, CentOS. From Fedora 40 onward, delta updates had been discontinued. openSUSE also uses delta-rpm's with its zypper manager. This is still in use, and the standard solution for the openSUSE Leap distribution today. A more primitive system, the SUSE patchrpm, worked by replacing changed files.

A similar system for the dpkg-APT package manager system of Debian is debdelta (2006); despite an apparent halt on the homepage, its package repository as well as the source code remains actively maintained. debdelta is not installed by default and not many mirrors have been set up for it. A member of the developer team has proposed yet another format that integrates directly into the currently mirrored main repositories called patch debs in 2018. It is intended to have more integrity checks.

A descendant of Debian, Ubuntu developers have tried many times to implement delta updates for their system. During 2006 they tried to create one, but were confronted with too many options and dropped the efforts. In 2011 they tried to just set up debdelta, but once again dropped the efforts in May of the same year.

The Arch Linux package manager pacman used to support a form of delta updating using VCDIFF (xdelta). It was scrapped due to an arbitrary command execution vulnerability (CVE-2019-18183) due to a lack of string escaping.

=== Windows ===
Windows Update has supported delta updates since Windows XP which are called express installation files. On redistributing updates, Windows Server Update Services has supported delta updates since Windows Server 2003.

=== FreeBSD ===
FreeBSD has supported delta updates using portsnap since November 2005. Given FreeBSD's traditional stance of focusing on source code updates, no method of delta binary updates currently exists.

=== Google ===
Google refers to delta updates as "smart updates." This has been implemented in Google's Android operating system devices that run on Android 2.3 or above. Google engineers have estimated that smart updates would be only about one third the size of a full update on average.

App APK updates in Android's Play Store use bsdiff since 2016, an efficient delta update algorithm introduced in 2003.

Google's open source project Chromium requires frequent updates to narrow the window of vulnerability. It uses a disassembly-based diffing algorithm called "courgette" to reduce diff size of two binary executable files, which reduces the diff patch from 6.7% (bsdiff) to 0.76% (bsdiff + courgette) for one version update. The technology helped Chrome to push its updates to 100% of users in less than 10 days.

=== Apple iOS ===
Apple's iOS is also capable of delta updates for operating system and application updates to reduce bandwidth usage.

== See also ==
- Data differencing
- Delta encoding
