= Van Biljon =

Van Biljon is an Afrikaans surname. Notable people with the surname include:

- Pite van Biljon (born 1986), South African cricketer
- Suzaan van Biljon (born 1988), South African swimmer, sister of Pite
- Willem van Biljon (born 1961), South African businessman
