= Bitange Ndemo =

Kenyan diplomat

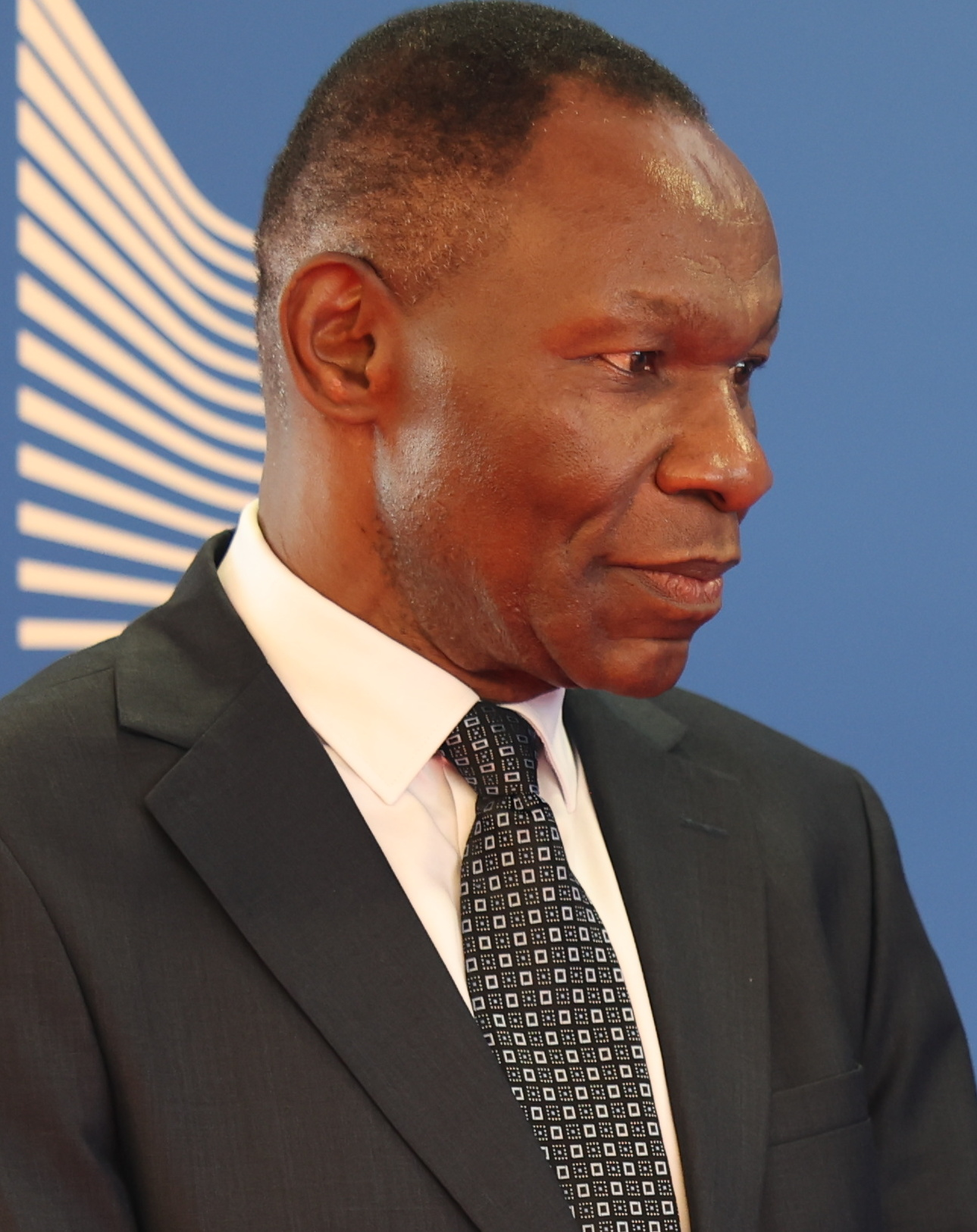
- Bitange Ndemo in 2023

Permanent Secretary for Ministry of Information and Communications (Former)
- In office 2005–2013
- President: Mwai Kibaki
- Succeeded by: Joseph Tiampati ole Musuni

Personal details
- Born: 4 December 1959 (age 66) Kisii
- Education: University of Sheffield (PHD); University of St. Thomas (Minnesota) (MBA Class of 1991); University of Minnesota (Bsc.Finance Class of 1988)
- Website: bitangendemo.me

Elijah Bitange Ndemo (born 4 December 1959 in Kisii County in South Western Kenya) is a global technocrat and professor currently serving as Kenya’s Ambassador to the Kingdom of Belgium and the European Union. Professor Ndemo is also an academic and newspaper columnist with the Kenyan newspaper Daily Nation and its sister publication, the Business Daily. He currently serves part-time as a Professor of Entrepreneurship at the University of Nairobi’s Business School. He teaches and researches entrepreneurship and research methods, with most of his research work being focused on ICT within small and medium enterprises, and their influence on economic development in Kenya. Previously served as the Permanent Secretary in the Ministry of Information and Communication, from 2005 to 2013 under the former Kenyan president Mwai Kibaki. He was awarded the prestigious presidential Chief of the Burning Spear of Kenya (CBS) for his distinguished services in 2006.

Ndemo is regarded as one of the key people who oversaw a transformation in the Kenyan ICT Sector. As the Ministry of Information and Communication Permanent Secretary, he accomplished this through various ICT policies and projects such as the installation of undersea submarine cables, the development of business process outsourcing industry, the reduction in mobile termination rates (MTRs), initiating Kenya Open Data, and the growth of tech hubs such as iHub and mLab in Kenya through effective regulation.

Prof. Ndemo holds a PhD in Industrial Economics from the University of Sheffield in the UK, an MBA from the University of St. Thomas (Minnesota) in the US and bachelor's degree in Finance from the University of Minnesota. He is the immediate past Honorary Chair of the Alliance for Affordable Internet (A4AI) and an Advisor to the Better than Cash Alliance, a global initiative to digitise payments.

== Early life and education ==
=== Education ===
1. PhD in Industrial Economics - University of Sheffield
2. Master of Business Administration - University of St. Thomas(Minnesota), Minnesota, USA, in 1991
3. Bachelor's degree in Finance - Carlson School of Management, University of Minnesota, USA, in 1988

== Career ==
1. Kenya’s Ambassador to the Kingdom of Belgium and the European Union, 2022 – Present
2. Professor of Entrepreneurship at the University of Nairobi . 2013–Present
3. Permanent Secretary in the Ministry of Information and Communication, Government of the Republic of Kenya. 2005 - 2013
4. Senior Advisor at the GINI Centre for Applied Sciences in Emerging Technologies. 2019–Present.

== Publications ==
1. Ndemo, E B (2015) Political Entrepreneurialism: Reflections of a Civil Servant on the Role of Political Institutions in Technology Innovation and Diffusion in Kenya. Stability: International Journal of Security and Development 4(1):15
2. Ndemo B and Smallbone D. (2015) Linkage Dynamics between MSEs and Multinational Corporations in Kenya. A longitudinal review of a 2005 conference paper –DBA Africa Management Review 1 2015.
3. Dennis M. A. and Ndemo B. (2014) What drives women out of Entrepreneurship? The joint role of culture and access to finance. DBA Africa Management Review 2 (2014).
4. Ndemo B. Rushda Majeed (2012) Case Study: Disseminating the Power of Information: Kenya Open Data Initiative. Innovation for Successful Societies. Princeton University Press (2012)
5. Ndemo E. B. (2007) Women entrepreneurs and strategic decision making. Management Decision 45(1), 118-130 (2007).
6. Ndemo B. (2006) Assessing sustainability of faith-based enterprises in Kenya. International Journal of Social Economics 33 (5/6), 446-462 (2006)
7. Ndemo B. (2005) Maasai Entrepreneurship and Change. Journal of Small Business & Entrepreneurship Vol. 18 No. 2. Spring 2005 pp 207–219. (2005)
1. Ndemo, B. and Aiko, D. (2020). ‘Mobile technology and development’. In: N. Cheeseman, K. Kanyinga and G. Lynch (eds.), Oxford Handbook of Kenyan Politics. Oxford: Oxford University Press.
2. Ndemo B. (2020) Slum Digitisation, Its Opponents and Allies in Developing Smart Cities: The Case of Kibera, Nairobi. In: Hawken S., Han H., Pettit C. (eds) Open Cities | Open Data. Palgrave Macmillan, Singapore
3. Ndemo, B., (2018) Toward the Transformative Power of Universal Connectivity. In Mark Graham Digital Economies at Global Margins. MIT Press.
