= Radek Maneuver =

The Radek Maneuver is a scale-up-then-scale-down tactic used in the administration of web services, specifically those deployed under a cloud computing paradigm (by a provider e.g. Amazon Elastic Compute Cloud or Microsoft Azure).

== History ==
Developed by Olivier "Radek" Dabrowski in the mid-2010s, the Radek Maneuver was originally conceived of in using and maintaining applications running on a PaaS system.

== Execution ==
The Radek Maneuver consists of a series of steps, usually executed via the PaaS or web portal interface.

The tactic should be used when a service is misbehaving or otherwise experiencing errors, and the suspected cause is the underlying cloud layer, rather than the application layer. This includes networking issues and other "bad box" problems.

The steps are as follows:

1. Identify the application or service which is misbehaving.
2. Increase the compute resource (number of CPU cores, amount of ram) for the instance on which the application is running. This is also known as scaling up.
3. Wait for the application to re-deploy and stabilize.
4. Scale back down to the original instance size.

== Principle of action ==
This scale-up-scale-down method is understood to shift the application to a different physical machine underlying the PaaS service or application virtual machine. While this layer of the cloud computing stack is generally out of the access of an application developer (instead in the hands of the cloud provider), the maneuver allows troubleshooting and dodging errors in that layer.
