= António Ferreira =

António Ferreira may refer to:

- António Ferreira (poet)
- António Ferreira (filmmaker)
- António Ferreira (sport shooter)
- Antônio Ferreira (hurdler)
- António Miguel Ferreira (born 1973), Portuguese businessman and writer
- Toninho Guerreiro (real name Antônio Ferreira; 1972–1990), Brazilian footballer
