= ElephantDrive =

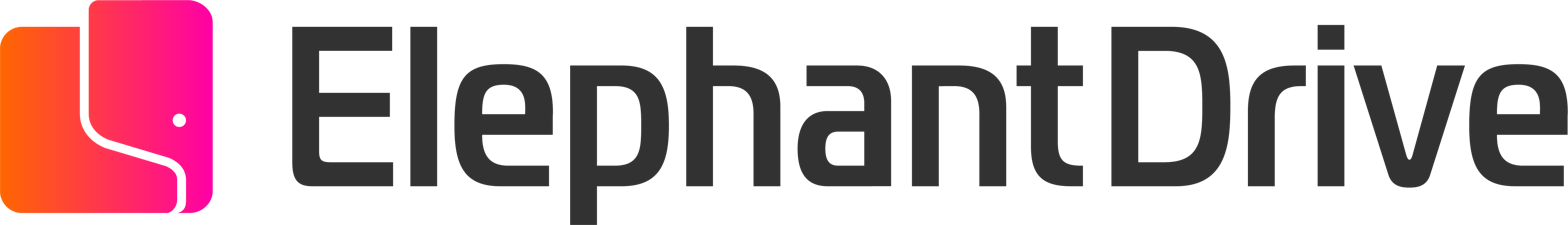
- Developer: ElephantDrive Inc.
- Release: April 2006
- Operating system: Windows: Vista, XP, 7, 2000 / Mac: OS X 10.4 and up
- Available in: English
- License: Proprietary
- Website: www.elephantdrive.com

ElephantDrive is a storage virtualization service used primarily as an online backup tool, but also as a remote access service/collaboration tool. The service runs on Windows, Mac, Linux, iOS, and Android platforms, and allows users to create simple automated backups for protecting data by moving it into cloud-based ElephantDrive account.

== Architecture ==
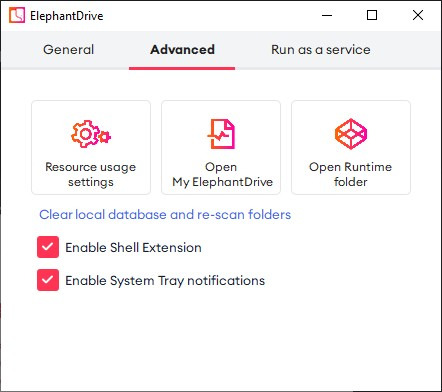
ElephantDrive Screenshot

ElephantDrive makes use of infrastructure-on-demand as part of its architecture, and is one of the first examples of the applications built on Amazon's S3 (Simple Storage Service). ElephantDrive initially utilized Amazon S3 as a tool for a datacenter migration, but quickly moved it into the production infrastructure.

== History ==
ElephantDrive, Inc. was founded by Michael Fisher and Ben Widhelm in 2005. ElephantDrive launched as a service in 2006. ElephantDrive's development was initially based in Westwood Village in Los Angeles, California.

ElephantDrive's first major product came in conjunction with the 2008 closing of early cloud storage provider and AOL property Xdrive when the service offered a free tool for migrating files off of the Xdrive platform, simplifying the process of switching providers.

The company then turned its focus to the Network Attached Storage (NAS) space, designing and deploying cloud storage optimized to run natively on NAS devices in a series of partnerships with the hardware makers themselves. The initial partnership was with NETGEAR's storage product line of ReadyNAS systems in the form of a co-branded embedded cloud backup service called the "ReadyNAS Vault." Additional cloud storage for NAS integration were launched with hardware makers QNAP and Thecus, both of which opted to use the ElephantDrive brand, as opposed to "Vault" co-branding. ElephantDrive is also integrated with NAS devices manufactured by Synology.

In May 2022, ElephantDrive was acquired by cybersecurity firm Jungle Disk.

== See also ==
- List of online backup services
