= Lunacloud =

Cloud computing service provider

- Type: Public
- Industry: Cloud computing provider Cloud computing Infrastructure as a Service; Web hosting
- Founded: November 21, 2011; 14 years ago Lisbon, Portugal
- Founder: António Miguel Ferreira; Charles Nasser
- Headquarters: Lisbon, Portugal
- Area served: Worldwide
- Key people: António Miguel Ferreira (CEO)
- Products: Cloud Server, Cloud Storage and Cloud Jelastic
- Services: E-commerce, Cloud computing
- Number of employees: 54
- Website: lunacloud.com (original UK. site) various national sites

Lunacloud is a cloud computing infrastructure service provider based in Lisbon, Portugal.

== History ==
Lunacloud was founded in 2011 by António Miguel Ferreira and Charles Nasser and launched its services to the general public on June 1, 2012. It provided cloud computing infrastructure as a service, such as cloud servers and cloud storage, and cloud hosting.

== Reception ==
TechWeekEurope TechRepublic and CloudSpectator have favorably rated the performance and cost of Lunacloud's services when compared to Rackspace and Amazon EC2.

== Locations ==
=== Headquarters ===
Lunacloud headquarters was in Lisbon, Portugal.

=== Customer service centers ===
- United Kingdom: London
- Portugal: Lisbon
- France: Paris
- Spain: Barcelona
- Russia: Moscow

== Website ==
Lunacloud localized storefronts differentiated by top-level domain and country code:

Region	Sovereignty	Domain name
Asia
Asia	China	lunacloud.cn
Europe
Europe	Portugal	lunacloud.pt
Europe	France	lunacloud.fr
Europe	Germany	lunacloud.de
Europe	Italy	lunacloud.it
Europe	Netherlands	lunacloud.nl
Europe	Spain	lunacloud.es
Europe	United Kingdom	lunacloud.co.uk
Europe	Russia	lunacloud.ru
North America
North America	United States	lunacloud.com
