= SDCH =

Dictionary-based compression algorithm

SDCH (Shared Dictionary Compression for HTTP), pronounced "sandwich", is a data compression algorithm created by Google, based on VCDIFF (RFC 3284).

SDCH achieves its effectiveness by using pre-negotiated dictionaries to "warm up" its internal state prior to encoding or decoding. These may either be already stored locally, or uploaded from a source and then cached.

It was supported natively in Google Chrome, Chromium, and Android, as well as on Google websites.

SDCH compression was removed from Google Chrome, and other Chromium products, in version 59 (2017-06-05).

Due to the diffing results and the data being compressed with the same coding, SDCH dictionaries aged relatively quickly and compression density became quickly worse than with the usual non-dictionary compression such as GZip. This created extra effort in production to keep the dictionaries fresh and reduced its applicability. Modern dictionary coding such as Shared Brotli has a more effective solution for this that fixes the dictionary aging problem.

== See also ==
- HTTP compression
- SPDY
