= António Miguel Ferreira =

Portuguese businessperson and writer (born 1973)

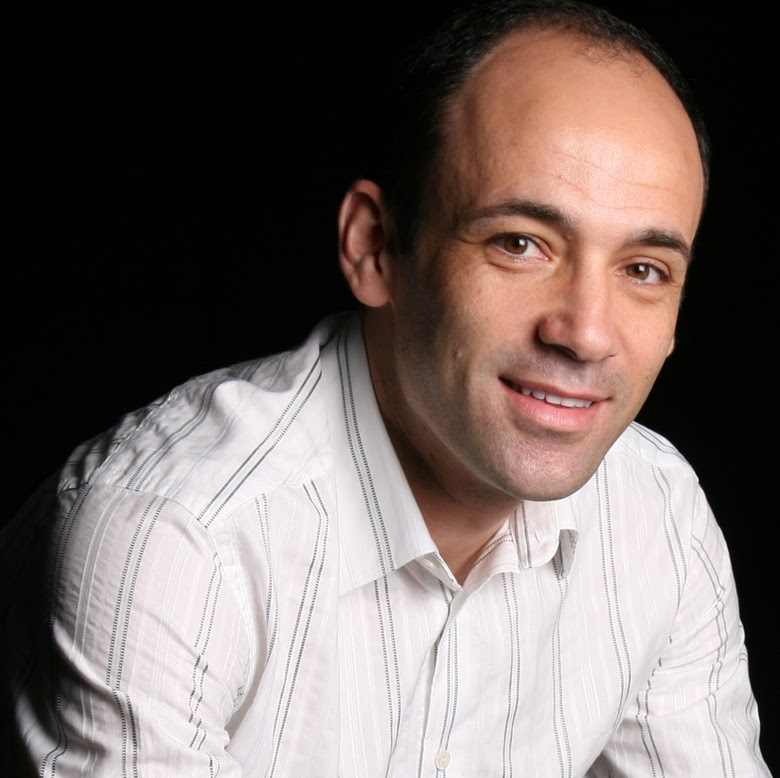
- Born: September 27, 1973 (age 53); S. João da Madeira, Porto, Portugal
- Education: INSA, Lyon (Computer Science Engineering)
- Occupations: Founder & CEO of Lunacloud, Managing Director of Claranet

António Miguel Ferreira (born September 27, 1973) is a Portuguese businessperson and writer.

== Career ==
Founder of Esoterica in 1994, the first private Internet service provider in Portugal, a business that he sold in 1999. Worked for VIA NET.WORKS Inc. (US-based Internet services multinational) as Director of European Network Services for Southern-Western Europe. Founder of Lunacloud in 2014. Joined the Claranet group in 2005, a cloud & cybersecurity managed services provider present in 11 countries. In the Claranet group he know serves as Group Executive Board member, Chairman of the operations in Iberia & Latin America.

== Bibliography ==
Title	Year	English title	Publisher
CGI Programming Unleashed	1996	CGI Programming Unleashed	Sams Publishing, USA
Web Programming Unleashed	1996	Web Programming Unleashed	Sams Publishing, USA
À procura do Ouro na Internet	1997	À procura do Ouro na Internet	FCA/Lidel, Portugal
Dicionário de Internetês	1997	Dicionário de Internetês	FCA/Lidel, Portugal
Internet de A a Z	1998	Internet de A a Z	FCA/Lidel, Portugal
Encontrar a informação certa na Web	1998	Encontrar a informação certa na Web	FCA/Lidel, Portugal
Programação na Web com CGIs	1999	Programação na Web com CGIs	FCA/Lidel, Portugal
Dicionet	2002	Dicionet	FCA/Lidel, Portugal
Introdução ao Cloud Computing	2015	Introdução ao Cloud Computing	FCA/Lidel, Portugal
