= Delta encoding =

Type of data transmission method

Delta encoding is a way of storing or transmitting data in the form of differences (deltas) between sequential data rather than complete files; more generally this is known as data differencing. Delta encoding is sometimes called delta compression, particularly where archival histories of changes are required (e.g., in revision control software).

The differences are recorded in discrete files called "deltas" or "diffs". In situations where differences are small – for example, the change of a few words in a large document or the change of a few records in a large table – delta encoding greatly reduces data redundancy. Collections of unique deltas are substantially more space-efficient than their non-encoded equivalents.

From a logical point of view, the difference between two data values is the information required to obtain one value from the other – see relative entropy. The difference between identical values (under some equivalence) is often called $0$ or the neutral element.

== Data differencing ==
In computer science and information theory, data differencing or differential compression is producing a technical description of the difference between two sets of data – a source and a target. Formally, a data differencing algorithm takes as input source data and target data, and produces difference data such that given the source data and the difference data, one can reconstruct the target data ("patching" the source with the difference to produce the target).

== Numeric example ==
Perhaps the simplest example is storing values of bytes as differences (deltas) between sequential values, rather than the values themselves. So, instead of $(2, 4, 6, 9, 7)$, we would store $(2, 2, 2, 3, -2)$. This reduces the variance (range) of the values when neighbor samples are correlated, enabling a lower bit usage for the same data. IFF 8SVX sound format applies this encoding to raw sound data before applying compression to it. Not even all 8-bit sound samples compress better when delta encoded, and the usability of delta encoding is even smaller for 16-bit and better samples. Therefore, compression algorithms often choose to delta encode only when the compression is better than without. However, in video compression, delta frames can considerably reduce frame size and are used in virtually every video compression codec. These frames require a different type of delta calculation.

== Definition ==
=== Numeric ===
The delta of numeric values is straightforwardly defined by subtraction, as shown in the example above. Due to the property of arithmetic operations, the numeric delta is symmetric: if the latter value $b$ is known, it is possible to apply the delta $b-a$ in reverse to obtain the previous value $a$.

It is also possible to produce a numeric "delta of deltas". This can be useful if the underlying data is generated by a process resembling $f(x) = ax + b$, as second-order delta would flatten the data to a string of zeros. Timestamps often behave this way. Even higher-order deltas may be useful for real-life data: for example, the measured distance (pseudorange) to a navigation satellite over time is best compressed using a third-order delta, a "delta of deltas of deltas".

In addition to subtraction, the bitwise exclusive or (XOR) also produces a symmetric delta. Time series databases often use the XOR operation as a delta between floating-point numbers as it produces easily compressible differences consisting of mostly zero bits.

Another variation is to change the distance between elements used for the delta operation: instead of calculating $b-a$ in the sequence $(a, b, c, d)$, a "distance-2" delta would calculate $c-a$. This is seen in the "delta" filter of xz.

==== Sample C code ====
The following C code performs a simple form of delta encoding and decoding on a sequence of characters:

void encode(uint8_t buffer[], size_t length) {
    uint8_t last = 0;
    for (size_t i = 0; i < length; ++i) {
        uint8_t current = buffer[i];
        buffer[i] = current - last;
        last = current;
    }
}

void decode(uint8_t buffer[], size_t length) {
    uint8_t last = 0;
    for (size_t i = 0; i < length; ++i) {
        uint8_t delta = buffer[i];
        buffer[i] = delta + last;
        last = buffer[i];
    }
}

=== Collections ===
For the difference between sequences or sets of values (e.g. character-strings and images), a delta can be defined in 2 ways, symmetric delta and directed delta. A symmetric delta between two sets includes enough information to make it reversible:

$$\Delta(\mathit{version}_1, \mathit{version}_2) = (\mathit{version}_1 \setminus \mathit{version}_2) \cup (\mathit{version}_2 \setminus \mathit{version}_1).$$

The difference between two sequences is analogously defined, except that information for locating the additions and removals are added. In computer implementations, it is exemplified by the output of diff (in the default, unified, and context modes): instructions in the form of "at position $x$, replace (old content) with (new content)".

A directed delta, also called a change, is a sequence of (elementary) change operations which, when applied to $\mathit{version}_1$, yields another, $\mathit{version}_2$ (note the correspondence to transaction logs in databases). In computer implementations, they typically take the form of a language with two commands: copy data from $\mathit{version}_1$ and write literal data. An example is the output of diff in the edit script mode.

==== Variants ====
A variation of delta encoding which encodes differences between the prefixes or suffixes of strings is called incremental encoding. It is particularly effective for sorted lists with small differences between strings, such as a list of words from a dictionary.

== Implementation issues ==
The nature of the data to be encoded influences the effectiveness of a particular compression algorithm.

Delta encoding performs best when data has small or constant variation; for an unsorted data set, there may be little to no compression possible with this method.

In delta encoded transmission over a network where only a single copy of the file is available at each end of the communication channel, special error control codes are used to detect which parts of the file have changed since its previous version. For example, rsync uses a rolling checksum algorithm based on Mark Adler's adler-32 checksum.

== Examples ==
One of the best-known examples of data differencing is the diff utility, which produces line-by-line differences of text files (and in some implementations, binary files, thus being a general-purpose differencing tool). Differencing of general binary files goes under the rubric of delta encoding, with a widely used example being the algorithm used in rsync. A standardized generic differencing format is VCDIFF, implemented in such utilities as Xdelta version 3. A high-efficiency (small patch files) differencing program is bsdiff, which uses bzip2 as a final compression step on the generated delta.

=== Binary delta compression ===
A delta update is a software update that requires the user to download only those parts of the software's code that are new, or have been changed from their previous state, in contrast to having to download the entire program. The use of delta updates can save significant amounts of time and computing bandwidth. The name "delta" derives from the mathematical science use of the Greek letter delta, Δ or δ to denote change.

Another name for the underlying technology is binary delta compression. In any case, the combination of the old version and the downloaded delta is used to reconstruct the new version. For information on the technology used to produce the differences, see data differencing.

=== Delta encoding in HTTP ===
Another instance of use of delta encoding is RFC 3229, "Delta encoding in HTTP", which proposes that HTTP servers should be able to send updated Web pages in the form of differences between versions (deltas), which should decrease Internet traffic, as most pages change slowly over time, rather than being completely rewritten repeatedly:

This document describes how delta encoding can be supported as a compatible extension to HTTP/1.1.

Many HTTP (Hypertext Transport Protocol) requests cause the retrieval of slightly modified instances of resources for which the client already has a cache entry. Research has shown that such modifying updates are frequent, and that the modifications are typically much smaller than the actual entity. In such cases, HTTP would make more efficient use of network bandwidth if it could transfer a minimal description of the changes, rather than the entire new instance of the resource.

[...] We believe that it might be possible to support rsync using the "instance manipulation" framework described later in this document, but this has not been worked out in any detail.

The suggested rsync-based framework was implemented in the rproxy system as a pair of HTTP proxies. Like the basic vcdiff-based implementation, both systems are rarely used.

=== Delta copying ===
Delta copying is a fast way of copying a file that is partially changed, when a previous version is present on the destination location. With delta copying, only the changed part of a file is copied. It is usually used in backup or file copying software, often to save bandwidth when copying between computers over a private network or the internet. One notable open-source example is rsync.

==== Online backup ====
Many of the online backup services adopt this methodology, often known simply as deltas, in order to give their users previous versions of the same file from previous backups. This reduces associated costs, not only in the amount of data that has to be stored as differing versions (as the whole of each changed version of a file has to be offered for users to access), but also those costs in the uploading (and sometimes the downloading) of each file that has been updated (by just the smaller delta having to be used, rather than the whole file).

==== Delta updates ====
For large software packages, there is usually little data changed between versions. Many vendors choose to use delta transfers to save time and bandwidth.

=== Diff ===
Diff is a file comparison program, which is mainly used for text files. By default, it generates symmetric deltas that are reversible. Two formats used for software patches, context and unified, provides additional context lines that allow for tolerating shifts in line number.

=== Git ===
The Git source code control system employs delta compression in an auxiliary "git repack" operation. Objects in the repository that have not yet been delta-compressed ("loose objects") are compared against a heuristically chosen subset of all other objects, and the common data and differences are concatenated into a "pack file" which is then compressed using conventional methods. In common use cases, where source or data files are changed incrementally between commits, this can result in significant space savings. The repack operation is typically performed as part of the " git gc" process, which is triggered automatically when the numbers of loose objects or pack files exceed configured thresholds.

The format is documented in the pack-format page of the Git documentation. It implements a directed delta.

=== VCDIFF ===
One general format for directed delta encoding is VCDIFF, described in RFC 3284. Free software implementations include Xdelta and open-vcdiff.

=== GDIFF ===
Generic Diff Format (GDIFF) is another directed delta encoding format. It was submitted to W3C in 1997. In many cases, VCDIFF has better compression rate than GDIFF.

=== bsdiff ===
Bsdiff is a binary diff program using suffix sorting. For executables that contain many changes in pointer addresses, it performs better than VCDIFF-type "copy and literal" encodings. The intent is to find a way to generate a small diff without needing to parse assembly code (as in Google's Courgette). Bsdiff achieves this by allowing "copy" matches with errors, which are then corrected using an extra "add" array of bytewise differences. Since this array is mostly either zero or repeated values for offset changes, it takes up little space after compression.

Bsdiff is useful for delta updates. Google uses bsdiff in Chromium and Android. The deltarpm feature of the RPM Package Manager is based on a heavily modified bsdiff that can use a hash table for matching. FreeBSD also uses bsdiff for updates.

Since the 4.3 release of bsdiff in 2005, various improvements or fixes have been produced for it. Google maintains multiple versions of the code for each of its products. FreeBSD takes many of Google's compatible changes, mainly a vulnerability fix and a switch to the faster divsufsort suffix-sorting routine. Debian has a series of performance tweaks to the program.

ddelta is a rewrite of bsdiff proposed for use in Debian's delta updates. Among other efficiency improvements, it uses a sliding window to reduce memory and CPU cost.

== Concerns ==
Main concerns for data differencing are usability and space efficiency (patch size). If one simply wishes to reconstruct the target given the source and patch, one may simply include the entire target in the patch and "apply" the patch by discarding the source and outputting the target that has been included in the patch; similarly, if the source and target have the same size one may create a simple patch by XORing source and target. In both these cases, the patch will be as large as the target. As these examples show, if the only concern is reconstruction of target, this is easily done, at the expense of a large patch, and the main concern for general-purpose binary differencing is reducing the patch size.

For structured data especially, one has other concerns, which largely fall under "usability" – for example, if one is comparing two documents, one generally wishes to know which sections have changed, or if some sections have been moved around – one wishes to understand how the documents differ. For instance "here 'cat' was changed to 'dog', and paragraph 13 was moved to paragraph 14". One may also wish to have robust differences – for example, if two documents A and B differ in paragraph 13, one may wish to be able to apply this patch even if one has changed paragraph 7 of A. An example of this is in diff, which shows which lines changed, and where the context format allows robustness and improves human readability.

Other concerns include computational efficiency, as for data compression – finding a small patch can be very time and memory intensive. Best results occur when one has knowledge of the data being compared and other constraints: diff is designed for line-oriented text files, particularly source code, and works best for these; the rsync algorithm is used based on source and target being across a network from each other and communication being slow, so it minimizes data that must be transmitted; and the updates for Google Chrome use an algorithm customized to the archive and executable format of the program's data.

== Connection with data compression ==
Data compression can be seen as a special case of data differencing – data differencing consists of producing a difference given a source and a target, with patching producing a target given a source and a difference, while data compression consists of producing a compressed file given a target, and decompression consists of producing a target given only a compressed file. Thus, one can consider data compression as data differencing with empty source data, the compressed file corresponding to a "difference from nothing". This is the same as considering absolute entropy (corresponding to data compression) as a special case of relative entropy (corresponding to data differencing) with no initial data.

When one wishes to emphasize the connection, one may use the term differential compression to refer to data differencing.

A dictionary translating between the terminology of the two fields is given as:

compression	differencing
none	source
uncompressed	target
compressed	difference, delta
compression	differencing
decompression	patching

== See also ==
- Data differencing – Method for compressing changes over time
- Interleaved deltas
- Source Code Control System – Version control system for source code
- String-to-string correction problem
- Xdelta: open-source delta encoder
