= Kamatera =

US cloud provider

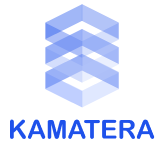
- Industry: Cloud computing
- Founded: 1995; 31 years ago
- Founder: Assaf Azulay, Yohay Azulay
- Headquarters: United States
- Parent: The OMC Group
- Website: www.kamatera.com

Kamatera is a US-based cloud provider founded in 1995. Kamatera provides infrastructure as a Service (IaaS) platforms to deploy virtual private servers (VPS) across their network of data centers.

== History ==
Kamatera's parent company, The OMC Group, was founded in 1995 by brothers Assaf and Yohay Azulay. The OMC Group owns several subsidiaries operating in the fields of cloud computing and software development, including ReutOne, which provides CRM software, Tyco, a website development company, and several cloud infrastructure companies including ClubVPS, GNS Cloud Solutions, VPSServer.com, CaaB-Cloud as a Business, JetServer, and Kamatera. In 2023, Kamatera acquired VPSServer.com, a Netherlands-based cloud hosting provider that had been operating for over six years. VPSServer.com operated out of 16 data centers in North America, Europe, and the Asia-Pacific region. As of 2026, Kamatera operates 25 data centers in locations across North America, Europe, the Middle-East, Asia, and Australia.

== Reviews ==
TechRadar noted that Kamatera offers flexible, affordable cloud VPS hosting with a global data center network, but it's best for experienced users ZDNET reviewed Kamatera as a highly scalable VPS hosting provider, however backups cost extra. A review by Website Planet noted its loading speeds as being "twice as fast in some instances" compared to Microsoft Azure. Cybernews highlighted that while the platform is user-friendly, deploying a server requires a degree of technical expertise. Techradar rated Kamatera the best IaaS provider for enterprise companies, citing the wide range of services and global data center distribution. A review by Forbes described Kamatera as a good option for SMBs needing access to enterprise-level resources without the enterprise pricing.

== Products ==
Kamatera provides cloud servers, virtual private cloud, cloud firewalls, load balancers, block storage options, and managed cloud. Kamatera's server infrastructure is built on Intel Xeon Scalable platinum processors, with NVMe storage, DDR5 RAM, 25Gbit/s network interfaces, and customizable memory configurations. It supports multiple operating systems, including Windows Server operating systems (versions 2008–2022). It also provides support for Linux and Linux-based operating systems, including AlmaLinux, CentOS, CloudLinux, Debian, FreeBSD, Rocky Linux, and Ubuntu. The company maintains a 99.9% uptime guarantee.
