= Xdelta =

Computer program

- Original author(s): Joshua MacDonald
- Developer(s): Joshua MacDonald
- Initial release: October 12, 1997; 27 years ago
- Stable release: 3.1.0 / 8 January 2016; 9 years ago
- Repository: github.com/jmacd/xdelta
- Written in: C and C++
- Operating system: Unix-like, Microsoft Windows
- Type: Utility software
- License: Apache License 2.0

Xdelta is a command line tool for delta encoding, which stores or transmits the difference (deltas) between sequential data, instead of entire files. This is similar to diff and patch, except diff computes and shows the difference between two complete files, while patch is primarily designed for human-readable text files; Xdelta is designed for binary files and does not generate human readable output.

Xdelta was first released sometime before October 12, 1997 by Joshua MacDonald, who currently maintains the program. The algorithm of xdelta1 was based on the algorithm of rsync, developed by Andrew Tridgell, though it uses a smaller block size.

Xdelta version 3 is primarily designed to work with streams following the standardized VCDIFF format, and it realized the compatibility among other delta encoding software which supports the VCDIFF format. It runs on Unix-like operating systems and Microsoft Windows. xdelta can handle up to 2^{64} byte files, and it is suitable for large backups.
