= Springpad =

Defunct task management application

- Website type: Online information capture and organization service
- Owner: Spring Partners
- Website: www.springpad.com
- Commercial: No, supported via lead generation
- Registration: Yes
- Launched: November 12, 2008
- Current status: Defunct

Springpad was a free online application and web service that allowed its registered users to save, organize and share collected ideas and information. As users added content to their Springpad accounts, the application automatically identified and categorized it, then generated additional snippets based on the types of objects added—for example, listing price comparisons for products and showtimes for movies.

Springpad was also available as apps on the iPad, iPhone and Android that synchronized with the Web interface. Springpad was bundled on new Toshiba notebook computers through a Web application subscription service.

On May 23, 2014, Springpad announced that it would cease operations on June 25, 2014. The company then allowed users to export their data (as JSON and read-only HTML formats), or to automatically migrate it to Evernote accounts before the expiration date.

== Features ==
Springpad users could use the main site interface which uses HTML5 from most browsers or use the smartphone app to capture notes, tasks, or lists which were then added to the user's "My Stuff", the user's personal database or collection. Additionally Springpad let users look up items of interest which were then automatically categorized based on type or manually categorized by the user. Category types included recipes, movies, products, restaurants and wine. Events could also be added to Springpad, and if the user used Google Calendar, they could opt to sync the event to it.

In addition to the smartphone app and site, Springpad could be used via browser extension for Google Chrome, or the Springpad Clipper, a bookmarklet to analyze webpages and clip relevant information from them—for example, the ingredients needed for a recipe—or to add the site as a normal bookmark. Another way users could add content to their Springpad "My Stuff" was by emailing entries to an email address specified on Springpad registration.

Springpad's smartphone apps could be used to scan barcodes to identify products, save them to the user's "My Stuff", and automatically generate additional product information and links. The mobile app could also save images taken with the phone's camera, and locate nearby businesses.

With most of the content added to a user's "My Stuff", relevant news, useful links and other helpful information could be viewed. Users could also attach additional notes and images to content they had already saved, and could add reminders and alerts which could be emailed to the user or texted to their phone. Springpad also added alerts to its own Alerts section for relevant news, deals or coupons for specific products users added.

For additional organization, anything added to Springpad could also be tagged. Users could also add entries to "Notebooks" to separate content by projects, or any other way they wished. Each Notebook included a section called a "Board", which acted as a pin board where users could "pin" content they'd added to the Notebook, allowing them to visually lay out items. If the user added a map to the Board and had entries that included an address, Springpad could automatically point out entries on the map.

By default, everything added to Springpad was private. However users could change the privacy settings for each of the types of items added, decide to make specific items public and shareable on Facebook and Twitter, add them to their public page, or keep them private but links to them with specific people.

== See also ==
- Comparison of notetaking software
- List of personal information managers
- Evernote, a similar notetaking tool that is often compared to Springpad
- Google Keep
