= Claranet =

British technology company

- Type: Private
- Industry: Technology
- Founded: November 1996; 29 years ago
- Headquarters: London, England, UK
- Key people: Charles Nasser (CEO)
- Website: www.claranet.com

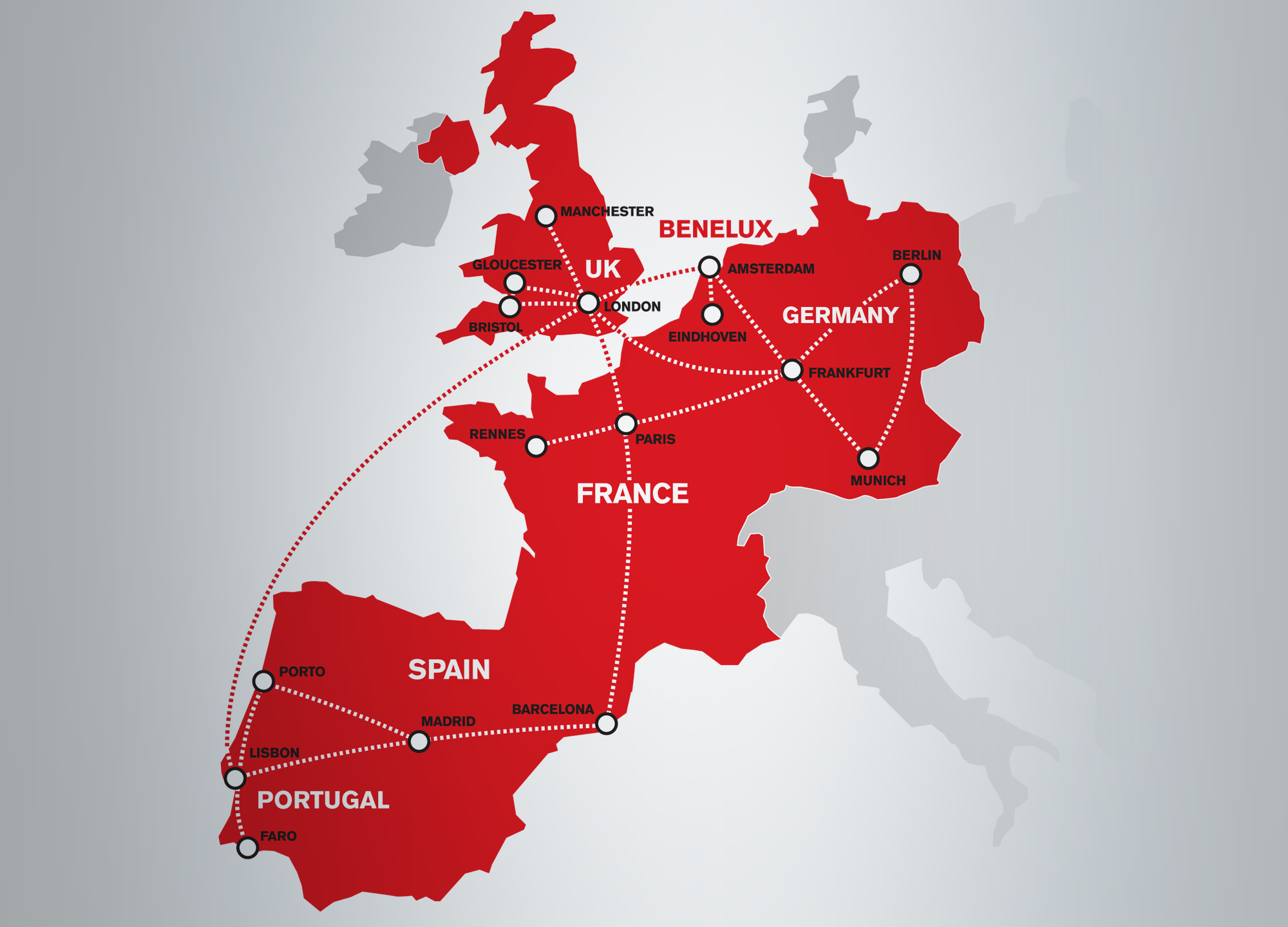
Claranet network as of 2013

Claranet is a business which provides network, hosting and managed application services in the UK, France, Germany, The Netherlands (Benelux), Portugal, Spain, Italy and Brazil.

== History ==
Charles Nasser founded the ISP in 1996 and by 1999 had 150,000 subscribers.

The company has annualised revenues of circa £375 million, over 6,500 customers and over 2,200 employees.

In 2012 ABRY Partners and Ares Private Equity Group invested in Claranet with ABRY later selling their minority stake in 2017

In 2017, Tikehau Capital invested a £80 million minority stake in Claranet.

== Acquisitions ==
Company acquired	Country	Date	Business	Reference
Netscalibur GmbH	(Germany)	2002	Internet Service Provider	
Netscalibur UK	(United Kingdom)	2003	Internet Service Provider	
VIA net.works	(United Kingdom)	2004	Internet Service Provider and Managed Hosting	
VIA net.works International / Amen Group	(United States) (Netherlands) (Portugal)	2005	Internet Service Provider	
Artful	(France)	2005	Managed Hosting Provider	
Star Technologies	(United Kingdom)	2012	Internet Service Provider and Managed Hosting	
Typhon	(France)	2012	Managed Hosting	
Cgest S.A	(Portugal)	2014	Managed Hosting	
Celigest SL	(Spain)	2014	Managed Hosting	
Grita	(France)	2014	Managed Hosting	
Echiron	(Portugal)	2014	Application Management	
NovaData	(Netherlands)	2014	Managed Hosting	
Rede VF (Visual Fusion)	(Portugal)	2015	Managed Hosting	
LinuxIT	(United Kingdom)	2015	Managed Hosting	
TechGate	(United Kingdom)	2015	Managed Hosting	
Morea	(France)	2015	Managed Hosting	
Runiso	(France)	2015	Managed Hosting	
Aspaway	(France)	2015	Managed Hosting	
Inok Consulting	(Portugal)	2015	Managed Hosting	
Bashton Ltd	(United Kingdom)	2016	Managed Hosting	
Diademys	(France)	2016	Managed Hosting	
Ardenta	(United Kingdom)	2016	Managed Hosting	
Credibility	(Brazil)	2016	Managed Hosting	
Rely	(Netherlands)	2017	Managed Hosting	
Oxalide	(France)	2017	Managed Hosting	
ITEN Solutions	(Portugal)	2017	Managed Hosting and Security Services	
Sec-1	(United Kingdom)	2017	Security Services	
Union Solutions	(United Kingdom)	2018	Managed Hosting	
NotSoSecure	(United States)	2018	Penetration Testing and Security Training	
XPeppers	(Spain)	2018	Managed Hosting	
Quinfox	(Netherlands)	2018	Managed Hosting	
CorpFlex	(Brazil)	2020	Managed Hosting, Security Services	
ID Grup	(Spain)	2021	Managed Hosting, Security Services	
Mandic Cloud Solutions	(Brazil)	2021	Managed Hosting	
BizDirect	(Portugal)	2021	Managing Hosting	
KHETO	(Germany)	2021	SAP Consulting	
Geko Cloud	(Spain)	2022	Managed Hosting	
Addon AG	(Germany) (Switzerland)	2022	SAP Managed Services	
Pictime Groupe	(France)	2022	Application Management	
Flowing	(Italy)	2022	Application Development	
ADTsys	(Brazil)	2023	Managed Hosting	
Six Degrees	(United Kingdom)	2026	Managed Hosting	
