= Willem van Biljon =

South African businessman

- Born: 29 December 1961 (age 64); Pretoria, South Africa
- Education: University of Cape Town
- Occupation: Entrepreneur

Willem van Biljon (born 1961) is an entrepreneur and technologist born, raised and educated in South Africa.

Van Biljon graduated from the University of Cape Town with a degree in Computer Science. He held engineering and research positions at LinkData, the Institute for Applied Computer Science and the National Research Institute for Mathematical Sciences.

Van Biljon co-founded Mosaic Software. Mosaic built the Postilion payment system, the first high-end payment transaction switch for commodity hardware and operating systems (Windows). Mosaic's investors included GE and Paul Maritz. The company became one of the top three payment processing software vendors in the world and was sold in 2004 to S1 Corp.

Van Biljon worked for Amazon.com where he, along with Chris Pinkham and Christopher Brown, led the team that developed Amazon's Elastic Compute Cloud (EC2). Willem built the business plan for the service and was responsible for product management and marketing for the public cloud service.

In 2006, van Biljon left Amazon Web Services and later started a venture with Chris Pinkham. The company, Nimbula, was focused on cloud computing software and was funded by Sequoia Capital and Accel Partners. In March 2013, Nimbula was acquired by Oracle Corporation.

Van Biljon co-authored seven patents in cloud computing including "Managing Communications Between Computing Nodes", "Managing Execution of Programs by Multiple Computing Systems".

== Publications ==
- Hirsch, M, SR Schach, and WR van Biljon, "High-Level Debugging Systems for Pascal: Interpreter versus Compiler," Quaest. Informaticae 3 (3), pp 9–13, August 1987.
- Van Biljon WR, "A geographic database system", Proceedings Auto Carto 8, Baltimore USA, pp 689–700, March 1987.
- Van Biljon WR, "Towards a fuzzy mathematical model of data quality in a GIS", Proceedings EDIS '87 Conference, Pretoria SA, 11 pp, September 1987.
- Van Biljon, WR, DA Sewry, and MA Mulders. "Register allocation in a pattern matching code generator." Software: Practice & Experience, 17(8):521–531, August 1987.
- Van Biljon, WR, "Extending Petri Nets for Specifying Man-Machine Dialogues", Int. J. Man-Machine Studies, Vol. 28, pp 437–455. 1988.
