= FlexiScale =

Utility computing platform

FlexiScale logo

FlexiScale is a utility computing platform launched by XCalibre Communications in the summer of 2007, and subsequently acquired by Flexiant. Launched shortly after Amazon's EC2 service, it was Europe's first and the world's second cloud computing platform. Users are able to create, start, and stop servers as they require allowing rapid deployment where needed. Both Windows and Linux are supported on the FlexiScale platform.

FlexiScale uses the open source Xen hypervisor. Backend storage comes from a highly redundant SAN, although the level of redundancy was called into question in August 2008, with more than 2 days of downtime resulting from an engineer mistake. The storage system previously consisted of a dual head NetApp storage array with the disk shelves connected to both heads. This was replaced with the launch of FlexiScale 2.0 in June 2010 with an "Amber Road" based storage solution from Sun Microsystems.

There have been a few revisions of the FlexiScale platform, from publicly available information the first version was based on the Virtual Iron VM management software. The second revision (called FlexiScale v1.5) of the platform was based on a in-house developed VM control system, now known as Extility. The most recent release (called FlexiScale v2.0) contributed an extensively revised User Interface.
