= Zadara =

American cloud computing company

- Industry: Cloud computing
- Founded: March 2011
- Headquarters: Irvine, California
- Key people: Yoram Novick (CEO))
- Products: Computer storage; IAAS
- Website: www.zadara.com

Zadara is a cloud computing company headquartered in Irvine, California providing managed cloud services for compute, storage, and networking.

== History ==
Zadara was co-founded in March 2011 by Nelson Nahum, Eli Shapira, Robi Hartman, and Yair Hershko. The company initially focused on providing storage-as-a-service solutions compatible with Amazon Web Services (AWS).

In 2021, Zadara acquired NeoKarm, a Tel Aviv-based developer of AWS-compatible cloud systems.

Around that time, Zadara rebranded from Zadara Storage to simply Zadara.

In 2022, Zadara acquired ZVS, a Brazilian cloud services provider.

In April 2023, Yoram Novick was appointed as CEO, with co-founder Nelson Nahum transitioning to the roles of Chief Technology Officer and Chairman of the Board.

In October 2023, Nelson Nahum officially departed the company.
