= CopperEgg =

American cloud computing systems management company

CopperEgg Corporation
- Type: Private
- Founded: 2010
- Headquarters: Austin, Texas
- Key people: Scott Johnson; Eric Anderson; Bob Quillin; Boris Milanovic
- Parent: Idera, Inc.

CopperEgg Corporation is a cloud computing systems management company based out of Austin, Texas. It provides various Software as a Service-based cloud monitoring services for public and private cloud environments, including server monitoring, website monitoring, and web application monitoring. In 2013, the company was recognized with the North America Frost & Sullivan Award for New Product Innovation within Cloud Monitoring Solutions. The company has strategic partnerships with companies such as Amazon AWS, Rackspace and SolarWinds.

== History ==
Scott Johnson and Eric Anderson co-founded CopperEgg in 2010. Johnson previously co-founded Thomas-Conrad, a networking hardware company that was acquired by Compaq Computer Corp. in 1995. He went on to co-found Surgient Networks in 2000, where he was the chief technology officer. Anderson was formerly a software consultant and has held engineering roles at Austin-based Centaur Technology. He had previously worked with Johnson on a startup in Austin called StorSpeed Inc.

The CopperEgg name is a reference to the Columbus Egg and pays homage to Nikola Tesla, who demonstrated the principles of a rotating magnetic field and induction motor by demonstrating how to make a copper egg stand on end.

In 2013, Idera, Inc. announced the acquisition of CopperEgg Corporation. The company stated the acquisition would combine Idera's database monitoring and CopperEgg's server and application performance management software to give its customers better visibility and control over their IT environments with SaaS-based management. As of 2016, CopperEgg Corporation's web site ceases operational, and redirected to IDERA, Inc.'s page. CopperEgg's monitoring software was renamed to Uptime Cloud Monitor.

== Venture capital ==
CopperEgg raised a total of $4,100,000 Series A funding and was backed by Austin-based Silverton Partners and Webb Investment Network. The company raised their initial round of $2,000,000 in funding in July 2011. They raised an additional $2,100,000 in May 2012 and hired a new CEO, Bob Quillin, to lead an expansion push with product build out and accelerate sales and marketing.

== Technology ==
The company's flagship product is a server monitoring solution called RevealCloud. Originally launched in July 2011, RevealCloud provides real-time server monitoring for Linux, Windows, FreeBSD and Mac OS X servers. The 5-second on-screen performance updates are visible through the SaaS application. Some of the key features include a less than 10-second install and a Web 2.0 graphical interface. CopperEgg introduced server application process monitoring in an update in 2012.

The company launched a second product in July 2012, a Website monitoring solution called RevealUptime. RevealUptime provides up to a 15-second response time, uptime and health updates on Websites, Web applications, Web services and TCP ports, visible through a SaaS application. These performance metrics can be viewed together with the corresponding servers monitored by the RevealCloud product.

In October 2012, CopperEgg added a management API that provides open programmatic access for automating and orchestrating server monitoring, website uptime analysis, and cloud infrastructure management. This update also added software-defined monitoring with DevOps integration into third-party automation tools such as Chef and Puppet.
