= MLab =

American software company, 2011–2019

mLab
- Formerly: MongoLab (2011–2016)
- Industry: Database software
- Founded: 2011
- Founder: Will Shulman; Jared Cottrell; Angela Kung Shulman
- Defunct: January 31, 2019
- Fate: Acquired by MongoDB Inc.
- Headquarters: San Francisco, California
- Area served: Worldwide
- Products: MongoDB (as a service)
- Owner: MongoDB Inc.
- Website: mlab.com

mLab (originally MongoLab) was a San Francisco-based cloud database service which hosted fully-managed MongoDB databases. mLab ran on cloud providers such as Amazon Web Services, Google Cloud, Microsoft Azure, as well as various platform-as-a-service providers.

== History ==
In May 2011, MongoLab secured $3 million in first-round funding from Foundry Group, Baseline Ventures, Upfront Ventures, Freestyle Capital, and David Cohen.

In October 2012, MongoLab received a follow-on investment of $5 million and shortly thereafter, mLab was named by Network World as one of the 10 most useful cloud databases along with Amazon Web Services, Google Cloud SQL, Microsoft Azure, Rackspace, and others.

In June 2014, MongoDB Inc. announced a fully managed MongoDB-as-a-Service add-on offering on the Microsoft Azure store, delivered in collaboration with Microsoft and MongoLab.

In February 2016, MongoLab changed its name to mLab.

In October 2018, mLab announced that it would be acquired by MongoDB Inc. All engineers at mLab were invited to join MongoDB Inc and existing customers will be transitioned to MongoDB Atlas instances. The acquisition closed on January 31, 2019.

== Data centers ==
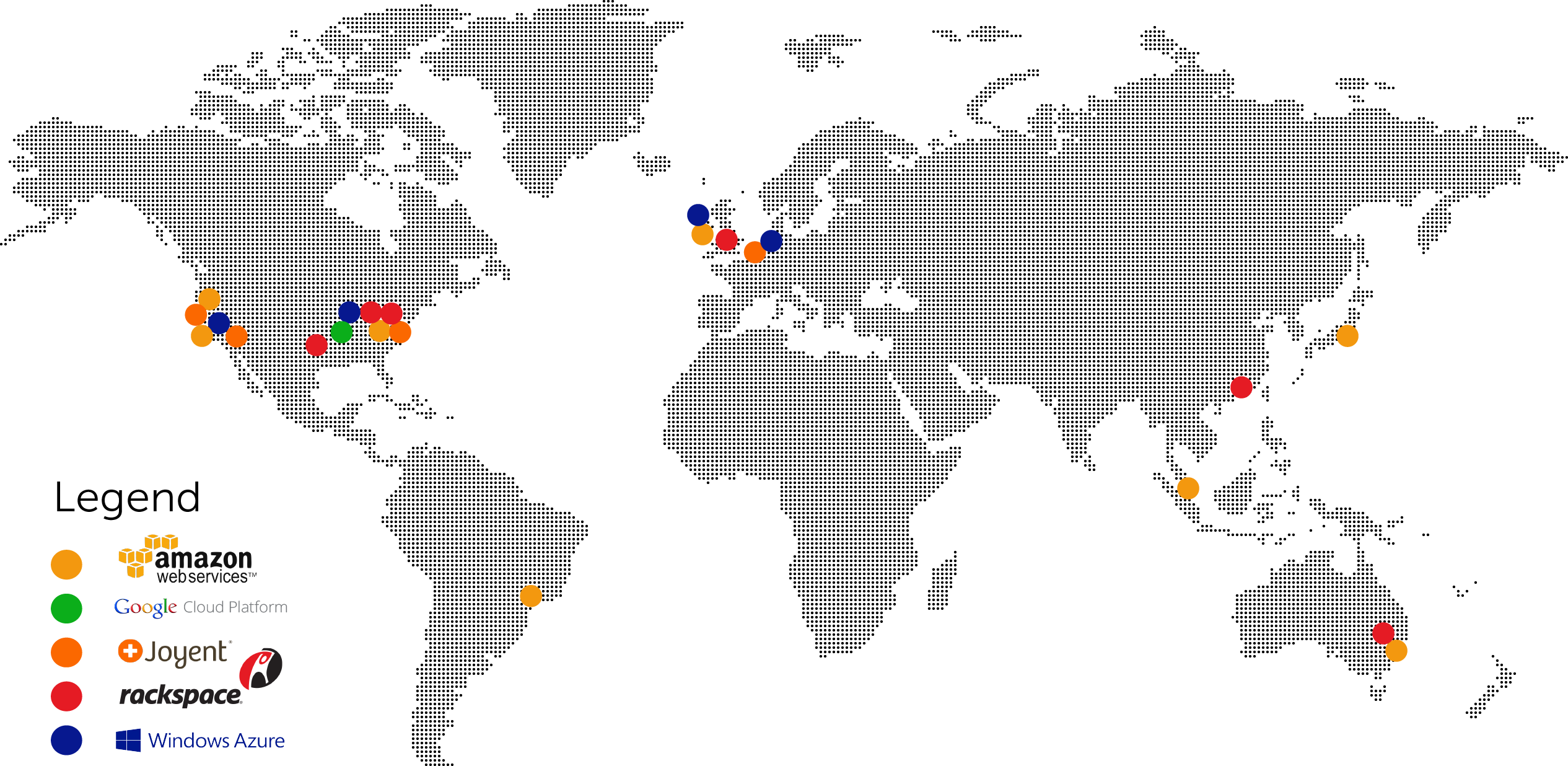
mLab serviced 25 data centers across the world

=== Infrastructure-as-a-Service (IaaS) ===
- Amazon Web Services (AWS)
- Google Cloud Platform
- Microsoft Azure

=== Platform-as-a-Service (PaaS) ===
- Heroku
