= Stuart Lipton =

British property developer

Sir Stuart Lipton
- Born: Stuart Anthony Lipton; 9 November 1942 (age 83)
- Education: Berkhamsted School
- Occupation: Property developer
- Known for: Founder of Stanhope plc Co-founder of Chelsfield
- Spouse: Ruth (m. 1966)
- Children: 3

Sir Stuart Anthony Lipton (born 9 November 1942) is a British property developer, a co-founder of Stanhope plc in 1983. In 2006, he was co-founder and deputy chairman of the property company Chelsfield with Elliott Bernerd, In January 2013, he co-founded, with Peter Rogers, Lipton Rogers Developments LLP.

== Early life ==
Stuart Lipton was born in 1942 to a Jewish family, the son of Bertram Green and Jeanette Lipton (née Lipton). He was educated at Berkhamsted School. His mother co-founded, with her brother Gerald Lipton MBE, the retailer Chinacraft in 1951.

== Career ==
Lipton is responsible for over 40 million sq ft of development in London, including Broadgate, Stockley Park, Chiswick Business Park, and Paternoster Square. He developed 22 Bishopsgate the tallest skyscraper in the City of London and the largest office building in Europe.

In 2000, he was awarded the Royal Society of Arts Bicentenary Medal for Services to Industrial Art. In 2007 he was awarded the Urban Land Institute (ULI) J.C. Nichols Prize for Visionaries in Urban Development. In 2008 he was awarded the British Construction Industry 21st Anniversary Hall of Fame Outstanding Contribution Award. In 2009 he was made a Life Trustee, of The Urban Land Institute.

Lipton was knighted in the 2000 Birthday Honours for services to the Property Industry and to the Environment.

== Personal life ==
He has been married to Ruth since 1966.
