= Chiswick (disambiguation) =

Chiswick is a district of west London, England.

Chiswick may also refer to:

- Chiswick, New South Wales, a suburb of Sydney, Australia
- Chiswick (ship), two ships
- Chiswick House, a Palladian villa in Chiswick, London
- Chiswick Press, an English publishing company
- Chiswick Records, an English record label 1975–1983
- Lord Chiswick, a character from the 1983–1989 British sitcom Blackadder
- Barry Chiswick, an American Professor of Economics

== See also ==
- Chiswick Park (disambiguation)
- Cheswick (disambiguation)
- Keswick (disambiguation)
