= Chiswick Park =

Chiswick Park may refer to:

- Chiswick Business Park
- Chiswick House§Gardens
- Chiswick Park Footbridge
- Chiswick Park tube station
