= Elliott Bernerd =

British property developer, the co-founder (born 1945)

- Born: 23 May 1945 (age 81); Maida Vale, London, England
- Occupation: property developer
- Spouse: 3 ex-wives
- Children: 2

Elliott Bernerd (born 23 May 1945) is a British property developer, the co-founder of the property company Chelsfield with Sir Stuart Lipton.

== Early life ==
He was born in Maida Vale, London on 23 May 1945, the only child of a film producer father. His parents divorced when he was 7. He was educated at various schools, leaving Davies Tutorial College, Holland Park, at the age of 15.

== Career ==
Aged 15, Bernerd went to work for Dorrington Investment Trust, with his heart "set on a career in property".

In 1983, he began the development of Stockley Park in west London (he paid £8 million for the site; in 1988, the development sold for £365 million, of which £20 million went to Bernerd). In 1986, he co-founded Chelsfield, which, in 1988, bought Wentworth Golf Club for £17.7 million (also reported as £20 million). Bernerd sold 40% of the club to Japanese investors, raising £32 million, in 1989. In 2004, Chelsfield sold the remaining 60% share, as Richard Caring bought the club for £130 million.

In 1993, Chelsfield acquired the Merry Hill Shopping Centre project, putting up £35 million, alongside £120 million from a group of Saudi Arabian investors (from whom Bernerd received a £6 million finder's fee). Chelsfield later bought out the Saudi investors. By 2004, Merry Hill's value was close to £2 billion.

In 2008, the Qatar Investment Authority purchased a 20% stake in Bernerd's property group, Chelsfield, which owned London's Camden Market.

According to Institutional Investor, Bernerd was a client of a Jersey-based offshore trust company La Hougue which engaged in tax minimisation through legal as well as illegal loopholes and other avoidance measures.

== Personal life ==
He had two adult daughters with his ex-wife, from whom he was divorced sometime before 1992. His daughter Tara Bernerd is a London-based interior designer.

In 1993, Bernerd was living in Surrey, with his third wife.
