= List of rail transport systems using third rail =

Third rail railways predominantly operates in urban areas. Notable exceptions are (or were) mainline electrics of the former Southern Region of British Railways and a few interurban railways in the US. In Europe top contact third rail tends to be limited to early electrified urban railways (the current conductor is normally left naked on top), contrary to North America where it usually has a protecting cover. Considered safe, the covered top contact conductor also appeared at most North American systems built relatively recently. Modern European systems predominantly make use of bottom or side contact power rails.

There are numerous urban rail systems, including these running mostly in tunnels, which do not use third rail at all. Such systems can be found in Asia, which may have been influenced by the overhead power supply formula followed by Tokyo Metro after 1960. All South Korean systems use overhead wires (or rigid conductors), as do most modern mainland Chinese metros. In Europe all significant Spanish systems now have overhead power supply. Modern Latin America urban rail also uses overhead wires, though with some important exceptions.

Special group of bottom power supplied railways are rubber-tyred systems. In fact, it may be difficult to classify them beyond any doubt. They may be trains but are they still railways? And do they still have 'third' rails? Despite doubts, such guided systems have been included in the list below.

The list does not include conduit system trams (trolleys), once quite popular in some countries, but none survive.

	Notes:
t/c	top contact; others have bottom or side contact power rails (or rail type not known)
gr/c	combined with guiding rail on rubber-tyred systems (including light metros such as VAL)
b/c	b/c – bottom contact

== Europe ==
Country	Location	Name of System	Notes	Link
Armenia	Yerevan	Yerevan Metro		
Austria	Vienna	Vienna U-Bahn	(b/c) Except line U6	
Azerbaijan	Baku	Baku Metro		
Belarus	Minsk	Minsk Metro		
Belgium	Brussels	Brussels Métro/Metro (STIB-MIVB)		STIB-MIVB
Bulgaria	Sofia	Sofia Metro		
Czech Republic	Prague	Prague Metro	(b/c)	
Denmark	Copenhagen	Copenhagen Metro		Metro
Finland	Helsinki	Helsinki Metro		
France	Paris	Paris Metro	(all lines on rails: t/c) (all lines on tyres: gr/c)	
France	Paris	Orlyval	(gr/c)	
France		Culoz–Modane railway	(gr/c)	1925–1976
France	Lyon	Lyon Metro	Line C is a rack railway and thus uses overhead wires	
France	Marseille	Marseille Metro	(gr/c)	
France	Rennes	Rennes VAL	(gr/c)	
France	Toulouse	Toulouse VAL	(gr/c)	
France	Lille	Lille VAL	(gr/c)	
France	Bordeaux	Tramway de Bordeaux	(partly)	
France	Villefranche-de-Conflent	Yellow Train	(t/c)	
France	Haute-Savoie	Ligne de Saint Gervais - Vallorcine	(t/c, covered occasionally)	
Georgia	Tbilisi	Tbilisi Metro		
Germany	Berlin	Berlin S-Bahn		
Germany	Berlin	Berlin U-Bahn	(small profile lines: t/c)	
Germany	Hamburg	Hamburg S-Bahn	(side contact)	
Germany	Hamburg	Hamburg U-Bahn		
Germany	Munich	Munich U-Bahn		
Germany	Nuremberg	Nuremberg U-Bahn		
Germany	Frankfurt	Frankfurt/Main Airport de:SkyLine PM	(gr/c)	
Greece	Athens	Athens Metro	t/c except Line 3 between Doukissis Plakentias and Athens Airport.	
Greece	Thessaloniki	Thessaloniki Metro	b/c	
Hungary	Budapest	Budapest Metro	(t/c) except 'Földalatti' (now Line M1)	
Italy	Brescia	Brescia Metro	AnsaldoBreda Driverless Metro	
Italy	Milan	Milan metro line 1	4 rails	
Italy	Milan	Milan metro line 5	AnsaldoBreda Driverless Metro	
Italy	Milan	Ferrovie Varesine	Former System (1901–1951), t/c)	
Italy	Turin	Turin VAL	(gr/c)	
Italy	Turin	Superga Rack Railway		
Italy	Naples	"metropolitana FS"	Former system (1925–1935), t/c	
Netherlands	Amsterdam	Amsterdam Metro	(b/c) Except Sneltram alignments	
Netherlands	Rotterdam	Rotterdam Metro	(b/c) Except Sneltram alignments	
Norway	Oslo	Oslo T-bane		T-bane
Poland	Warsaw	Warsaw Metro	(b/c)	
Portugal	Lisbon	Lisbon Metro	(t/c)	
Romania	Bucharest	Bucharest Metro	(b/c), except sidings where overhead wire is used	
Russia	Moscow	Moscow Metro		
Russia	Saint Petersburg	Saint Petersburg Metro		
Russia	Novosibirsk	Novosibirsk Metro		
Russia		Kazan Metro		
Russia		Yekaterinburg Metro		
Russia		Nizhny Novgorod Metro		
Russia		Omsk Metro		
Russia		Samara Metro		
Spain	Madrid	Madrid Barajas International Airport PM	(gr/c)	
Spain	Barcelona	Barcelona Metro	Former System (until 2002): Line 1 (t/c, covered) and lines 3 and 4 (b/c)	
Sweden	Stockholm	Stockholm T-bana	(t/c, covered)	
Switzerland		Chemin de Fer de Martigny au Châtelard	partly 3rd rail	
Turkey	İzmir	İzmir Metro		
Turkey	Ankara	Ankara Metro		
Turkey	Istanbul	Istanbul Metro		
Ukraine	Kyiv	Kyiv Metro		
Ukraine	Kharkiv	Kharkiv Metro		
Ukraine	Dnipro	Dnipro Metro		
United Kingdom	Brighton	Volk's Electric Railway	(t/c)	
United Kingdom	Glasgow	Glasgow Subway	(t/c)	
United Kingdom	Hythe	Hythe Pier Railway		
United Kingdom	London	Docklands Light Railway	(b/c)	
United Kingdom	London	London Underground	(four-rail, t/c)	
United Kingdom	London	LNWR suburban electrification	(four-rail, t/c at inception, but now three-rail, t-c between Harrow & Wealdstone and Watford Junction, three-rail, t-c between Acton Central and Gunnersbury, third-rail, t-c between Shoreditch and Highbury & Islington, and overhead electrified between Dalston and Acton Central. Adjacent sections of overhead and third rail, t-c between Dalston and Highbury & Islington. Still four-rail, t-c on sections shared with London Underground (Gunnersbury-Richmond, Queens Park-Harrow & Wealdstone). Shoreditch to Broad Street section now closed)	
United Kingdom	London	Northern City Line	(t/c)	
United Kingdom	Liverpool	Merseyrail	(t/c)	
United Kingdom	Southern England	Southern Region	(t/c), (large area covering most of the current South Western, Island Line, Southern and Southeastern TOCs )	
United Kingdom	Stansted Airport	Airport people mover	Transfer between terminals	

United Kingdom

Former:

- Giant's Causeway Tramway (elevated third rail; later replaced by overhead wire)
- Bessbrook and Newry Tramway (t/c)
- Liverpool Overhead Railway (t/c)
- Manchester Victoria - Bury (by the Lancashire and Yorkshire Railway) (side contact)
- Tyneside Electrics (t/c)

Switzerland
Former:

- Chemin de fer Fribourg–Morat–Anet (1903–1947)

== Asia ==
Country	Location	Name of System	Notes
China		Beijing Subway	
China		Tianjin Metro	t/c, covered
China		Wuhan Metro	
China		Guangzhou Metro Line 4&5	
India		Kolkata Metro	t/c
India		Kanpur Metro	b/c
India		Namma Metro	b/c
India		Kochi Metro	b/c
India		Rapid Metro Gurgaon	b/c
India		Ahmedabad Metro	b/c
Indonesia	Palembang	Palembang LRT	
Indonesia	Jakarta	Jakarta LRT	
Iran		Tehran Metro	
Japan	Hiroshima	Astram Line	(gr/c)
Japan	Kobe	Portliner	(gr/c)
Japan	Kobe	Rokkoliner	(gr/c)
Japan	Nagoya	Nagoya Municipal Subway	Higashiyama, Meijō and Meikō lines
Japan	Osaka	Osaka Municipal Subway	Midōsuji, Tanimachi, Yotsubashi, Chūō and Sennichimae lines
Japan	Osaka	Kita-Osaka Kyūkō Railway	reciprocal service with Midōsuji Line
Japan	Osaka	Keihanna Line	reciprocal service with Chūō Line
Japan	Osaka	New Tram	(gr/c)
Japan	Sapporo	Sapporo Municipal Subway	Namboku Line
Japan	Tokyo	Yamaman Yukarigaoka Line	(gr/c)
Japan	Tokyo	Tokyo Metro	Ginza and Marunouchi Lines (t/c, covered)
Japan	Tokyo	Yurikamome Line	(gr/c)
Japan	Tokyo	Seibu Yamaguchi Line	(gr/c)
Japan	Tokyo	Saitama New Shuttle	(gr/c)
Japan	Yokohama	Yokohama Municipal Subway	Blue Line
Japan	Yokohama	Kanazawa Seaside Line	(gr/c)
Malaysia	Kuala Lumpur	Ampang Line	
Malaysia	Kuala Lumpur	Kelana Jaya Line	
North Korea	Pyongyang	Pyongyang Metro	
Philippines	Metro Manila	MRT-7	Under construction;;
Singapore	Singapore	Light Rail Transit (LRT)	Three separate systems
Singapore	Singapore	Mass Rapid Transit (MRT)	Except North East Line
South Korea	Busan	Busan-Gimhae Light Rail Transit	(b/c)
South Korea	Seoul	Ui LRT	(b/c)
South Korea	Uijeongbu	U Line	(gr/c)
South Korea	Yongin	Everline	(t/c)
Taiwan	Taipei	Taipei MRT	(VAL Line: gr/c)
Taiwan	Kaohsiung	Kaohsiung MRT	
Thailand	Bangkok	MRT	
Thailand	Bangkok	BTS skytrain	
United Arab Emirates	Dubai	Dubai Metro	
Uzbekistan	Tashkent	Tashkent Metro	

Japan

- Sapporo Chikatetsu - Namboku Line: rubber-tyred with central guiding/return rail and a flat power rail (t/c) which is also one of the rollways for the rubber tyres; Tōzai and Tōhō Lines: rubber-tyred with o/h power supply, a flat return rail which is also one of the rollways for the rubber tyres and a central guiding rail
- Nagoya Chikatetsu - Higashiyama, Meijō, Meikō Lines (t/c, covered)
- Osaka Chikatetsu - except Sakaisuji, Nagahori Tsurumi-ryokuchi and Imazatosuji Lines (t/c, covered)
- Kinki Nippon Tetsudō - Keihanna Line (t/c, covered)
- Kita-Osaka Kyuko Railway (t/c, covered)

Former:

- Shin'etsu Line at Usui Pass (Yokokawa-Karuizawa) - mainline system
- Komaki Peachliner (rubber-tyred, but power supply separate from guiding rail; closed in 2006)

== Africa ==
Country	Location	Name of System	Notes
Egypt	Cairo	Cairo Metro	Line 2 (Shobra - El Mounib); Line 3 (Attaba - Al Ahram)
Nigeria	Lagos	Lagos Rail Mass Transit	Blue Line

== North America ==
Country	Location	Name of System	Notes
Canada	Montreal	Montreal Métro	(gr/c)
Canada	Toronto	Toronto subway and RT	(t/c, covered)
Canada	Vancouver	Vancouver SkyTrain	(t/c, covered)
Mexico	Mexico City	Mexico City Metro	All lines (gr/c), except Line A (overhead)
United States	Chicago	Chicago 'L'	Chicago 'L' and Subway, (t/c)
United States	New York City	Airtrain JFK	
United States	New York City	Amtrak	Penn Station complex, north and east river tunnels on Northeast Corridor, Empire tunnel and Sunnyside Yard for diesel/electric engines and LIRR service to Penn Station (t/c, covered)
United States	New York City	Long Island Rail Road	NYC commuter system (t/c, covered); (Portions run on diesel & diesel/electric hybrid)
United States	New York City	Metro-North Railroad	NYC commuter system (b/c); (Portions run on diesel & diesel/electric hybrid); (New Haven Line trains switch between third rail and overhead catenary power between Mount Vernon East and Pelham, at speed)
United States	New York City	New York City Subway	(t/c, covered)
United States	New York City	PATH	(t/c, covered)
United States	New York City	Staten Island Railway	(t/c, covered)
United States	San Francisco	BART	
United States	San Francisco	AirTrain SFO	(gr/c)
United States	Washington DC	Washington Metro	(t/c, covered)
United States	Boston	Massachusetts Bay Transportation Authority (MBTA)	Red, Orange and Blue (partly) Lines (t/c)
United States	Philadelphia	SEPTA Metro	(t/c, covered) (B, L, M)
United States	Philadelphia	PATCO	(t/c, covered)
United States	Atlanta	MARTA	(t/c, covered)
United States	Atlanta	Atlanta International Airport PM	(gr/c)
United States	Los Angeles	Metro Rail	Red Line (t/c, covered)
United States	Miami	Miami Metrorail	(t/c, covered)
United States	Miami	Miami Metromover	(gr/c)
United States	Baltimore	Baltimore Metro Subway	(t/c, covered)
United States	Detroit	Detroit People Mover	
United States	Chicago	O'Hare International Airport	Transit System (gr/c)
United States	Tampa	Tampa International Airport PM	(gr/c)
United States	Denver	Denver International Airport PM	(gr/c)
United States	Seattle	Satellite Transit System PM in Airport	(gr/c)
United States	Dallas	Dallas/Fort Worth International Airport PM	(gr/c)
United States	San Juan, Puerto Rico	Tren Urbano	Semi-suspended inverted collector rail (b/c?)

United States

Former:

- World's Columbian Exposition (Chicago, 1893) railway (t/c)
- Pennsylvania Railroad, suburban network New York - New Jersey (t/c, covered)
- Albany & Hudson Railroad (t/c)
- Baltimore Belt Line, Baltimore and Ohio Railroad
- Scioto Valley Traction Co. (Ohio) (t/c?)
- Oneida Railway (NY Central RR) (b/c)
- Detroit River Tunnel (Detroit - Windsor), Michigan Central Railroad
- Michigan Rly.: Grand Rapids - Kalamazoo and branch lines
- Central California Traction Co., Sacramento – Stockton (b/c)
- Sacramento Northern Railway (t/c)
- Laurel Line (Scranton/Wilkes-Barre, PA)
- Aurora Elgin & Chicago Railroad (t/c)
- Key System - on San Francisco–Oakland Bay Bridge (t/c, covered)
- Jacksonville VAL (gr/c)
- Nantasket Beach Branch; Greenbush Line Braintree-Cohasset, suburban New Haven Railroad, (t/c, center of track)

== South America ==
Country	Location	Name of System	Notes
Argentina		Trenes de Buenos Aires	Mitre and Sarmiento railways
Argentina	Buenos Aires	Metrovías	Urquiza railway, Buenos Aires subway line B (t/c, covered)
Brazil		São Paulo Metro	(b/c), except Line 5 (overhead) and 15 (monorail)
Brazil		Rio de Janeiro Metro	(t/c, partly covered)
Brazil		Federal District Metro	(b/c)
Chile		Santiago Metro	Line 1, Line 2 and Line 5 (gr/c), Line 4 and Line 4A (t/c)
Venezuela	Caracas	Caracas Metro	
