= Gunnersbury =

Area of west London, England

Coordinates: 51.4927°N 0.2777°W

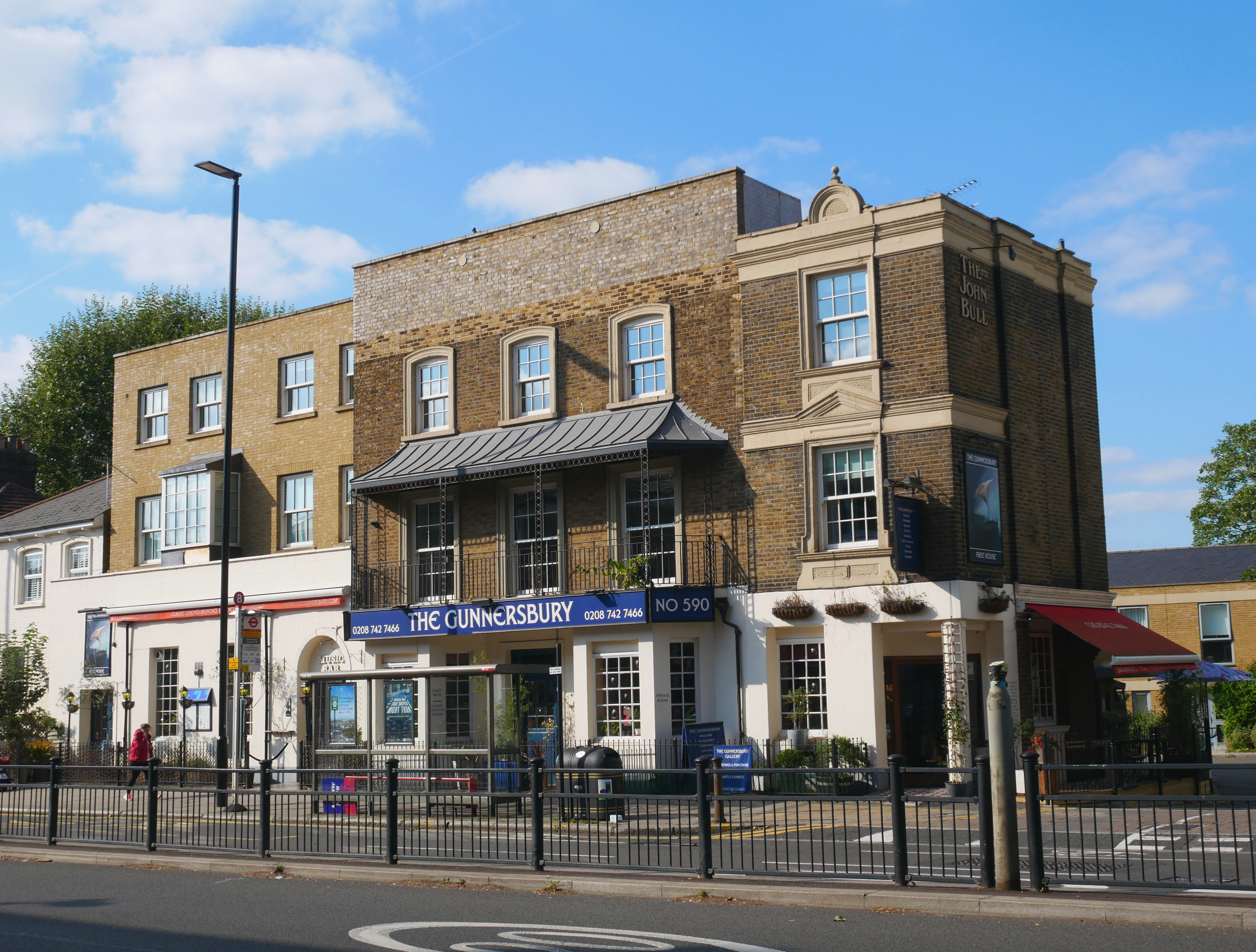
- The Gunnersbury public house

- Location within Greater London
- OS grid reference: TQ195785
- London borough: Hounslow; Ealing
- Ceremonial county: Greater London
- Region: London
- Country: England
- Sovereign state: United Kingdom
- Post town: LONDON
- Postcode district: W3, W4, W5
- Post town: BRENTFORD
- Postcode district: TW8
- Dialling code: 020
- Police: Metropolitan
- Fire: London
- Ambulance: London
- UK Parliament: Hammersmith and Chiswick
- London Assembly: South West; Ealing and Hillingdon

Gunnersbury is an area of West London, England.

== Toponymy ==
The name "Gunnersbury" originally meant "Gunner's (Gunnar's) fort", and is a combination of an old Scandinavian personal name + Middle English -bury, meaning, "fort", or "fortified place".

== Politics ==
Gunnersbury is part of the Hammersmith and Chiswick constituency for elections to the House of Commons of the United Kingdom.

Gunnersbury is part of the Chiswick Gunnersbury ward for elections to Hounslow London Borough Council.

== Development ==
Gunnersbury consists mainly of pre-war housing of a variety of types, including flats, terrace, semi detached, and detached houses, some of which are ex-local authority built.

The defining symbol of Gunnersbury is the 18-storey high BSI (British Standards Institution) building on Chiswick High Road. Between 1966 and 1992 the block housed a divisional headquarters of IBM UK. Below this building Gunnersbury station serves the Richmond branch of the District line and the London Overground's Mildmay line to Stratford.

On the north side of the High Road is The Gunnersbury, formerly the John Bull pub, built in 1853, with a billiards saloon built a little later. It became a music venue, visited by bands including The Who.

In August 1921, London General Omnibus Company established a bus overhaul facility off Chiswick High Road. It incorporated a Training School with a bus skidpan. In 1989, London Transport closed the works. In 2001 the site was redeveloped as the Chiswick Business Park with 12 medium density office buildings. It houses companies including SBS Broadcasting Networks, CBS News, Technicolor, Discovery Channel Europe, Intelsat, Singapore Airlines, Qantas, Foxtons, and a Virgin Active health club.

Immediately to the east is Gunnersbury Triangle nature reserve. An area of woodland, it supports many species of birds, plants, and animals. It has free admission and its entrance is on the south of Bollo Lane, a few yards from Chiswick Park tube station.

Just to the north of Gunnersbury Triangle, the Chiswick Park Footbridge connects Gunnersbury's Chiswick Business Park with Chiswick Park tube station. It was designed by Expedition Engineering and Useful Studios.

Gunnersbury lends its name to a nearby secondary school, formerly a grammar school, in Brentford. Gunnersbury Catholic School is a boys-only Catholic comprehensive with a co-educational sixth form. It used to be located on Gunnersbury Avenue and it backed on to Gunnersbury Park. Since 1984, it has been located in The Ride, Brentford.

In 1886, Gunnersbury was given its own parish church, dedicated to Saint James. The church stood on Chiswick High Road, near Chiswick Roundabout. The church was decommissioned just over a century later, in 1987, and demolished soon afterwards. The parish was united with that of St Paul's, Brentford.

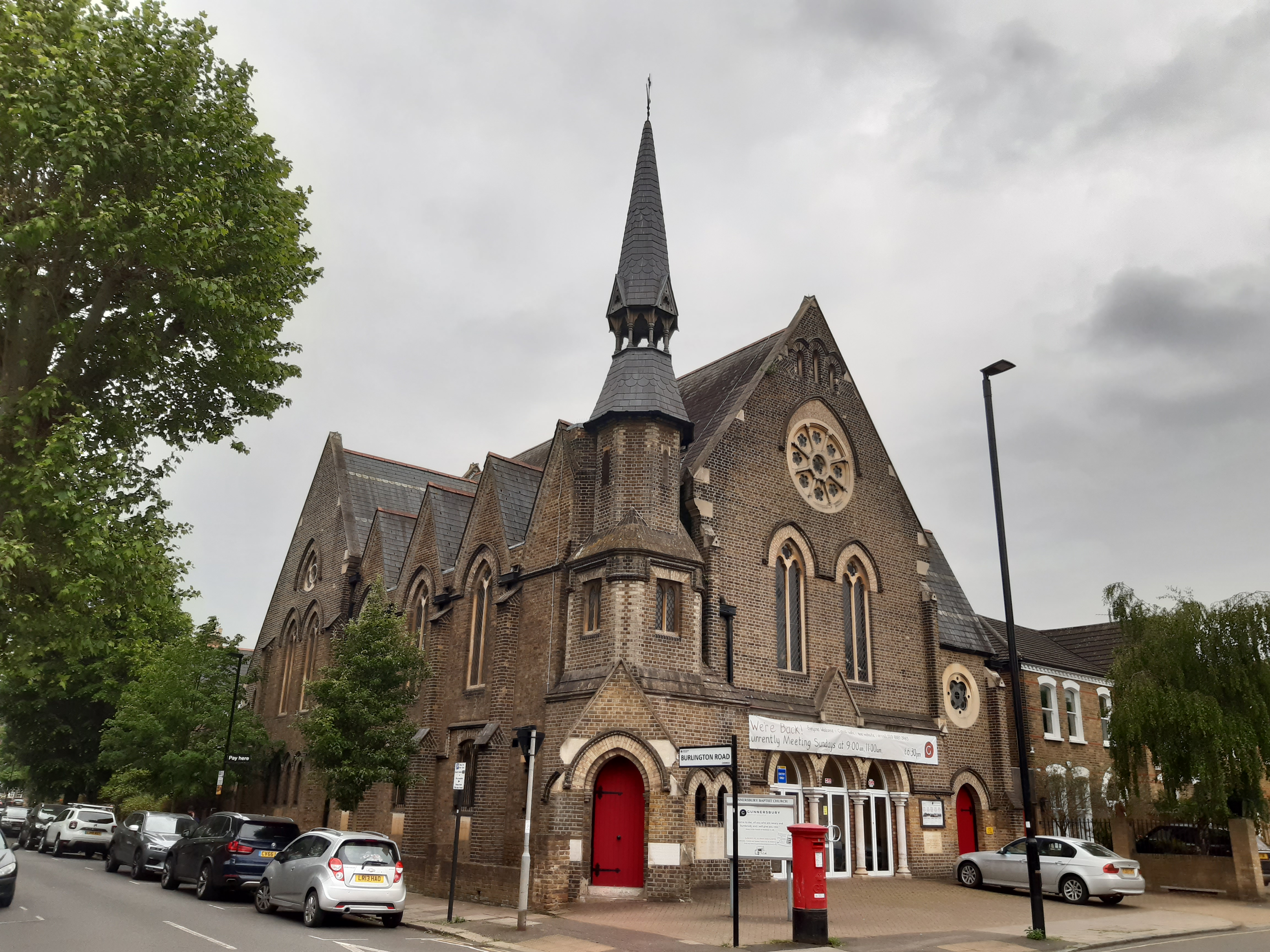
Gunnersbury Baptist Church

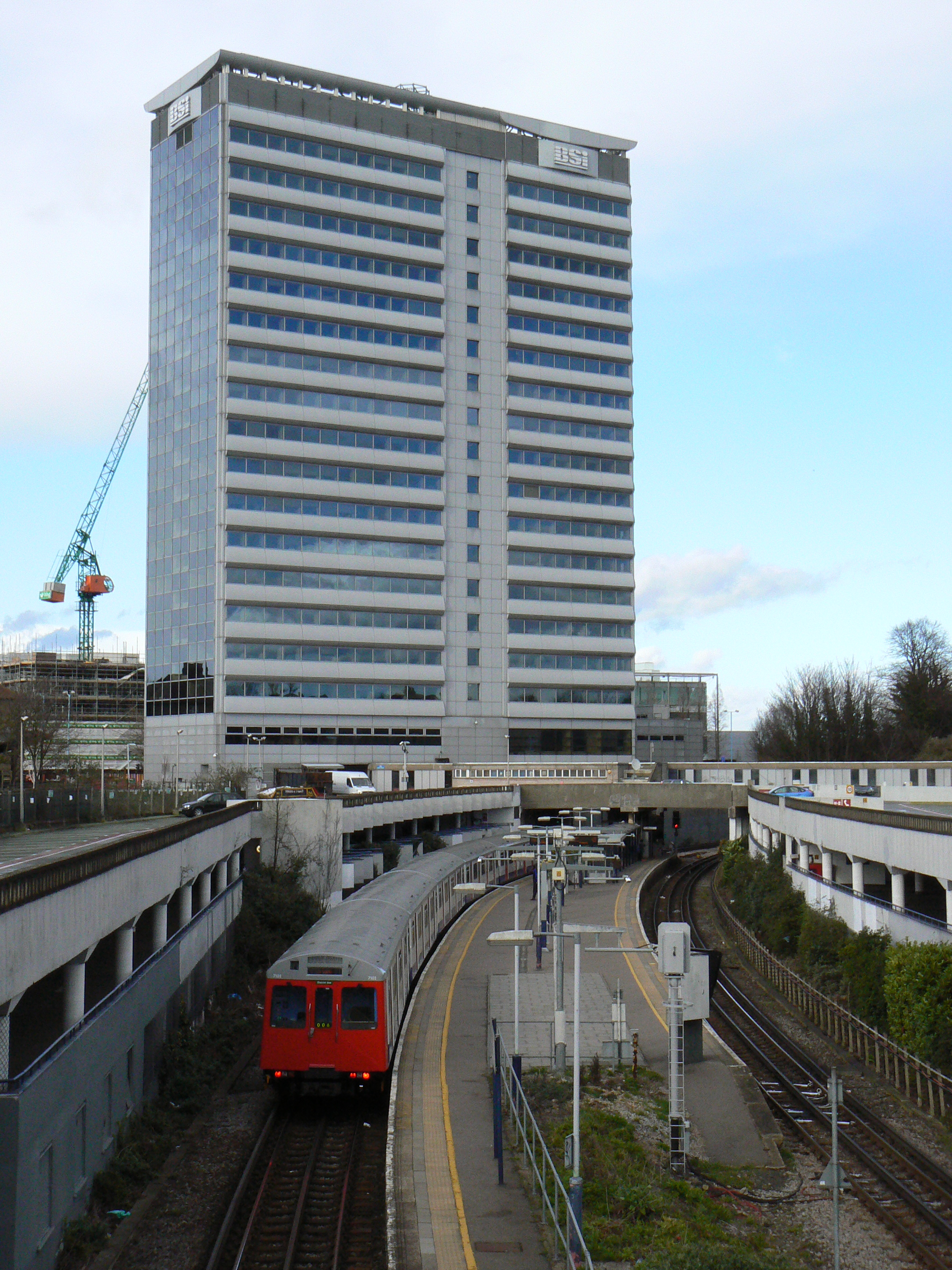
BSI building over Gunnersbury station

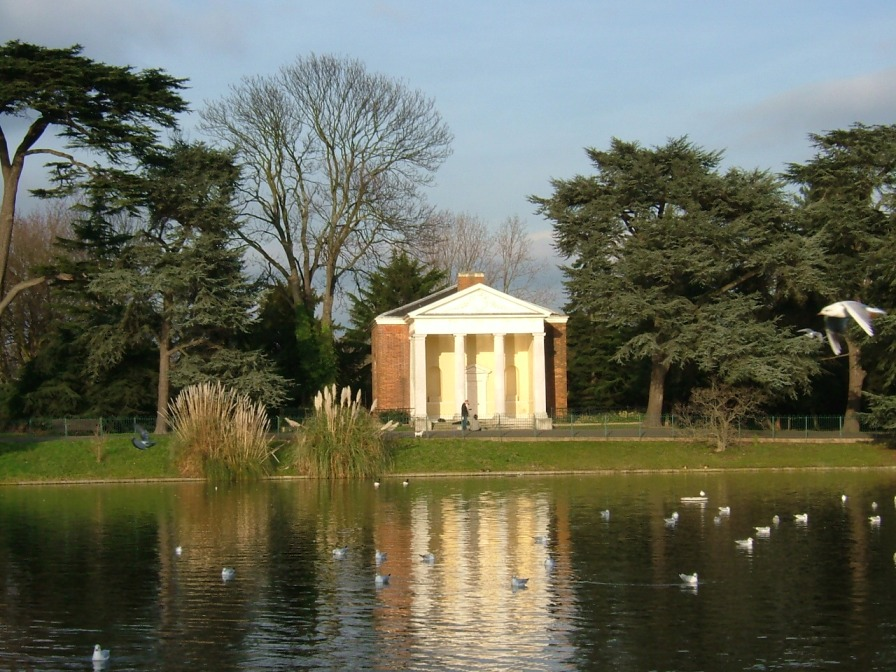
18th-century mock temple in Gunnersbury Park

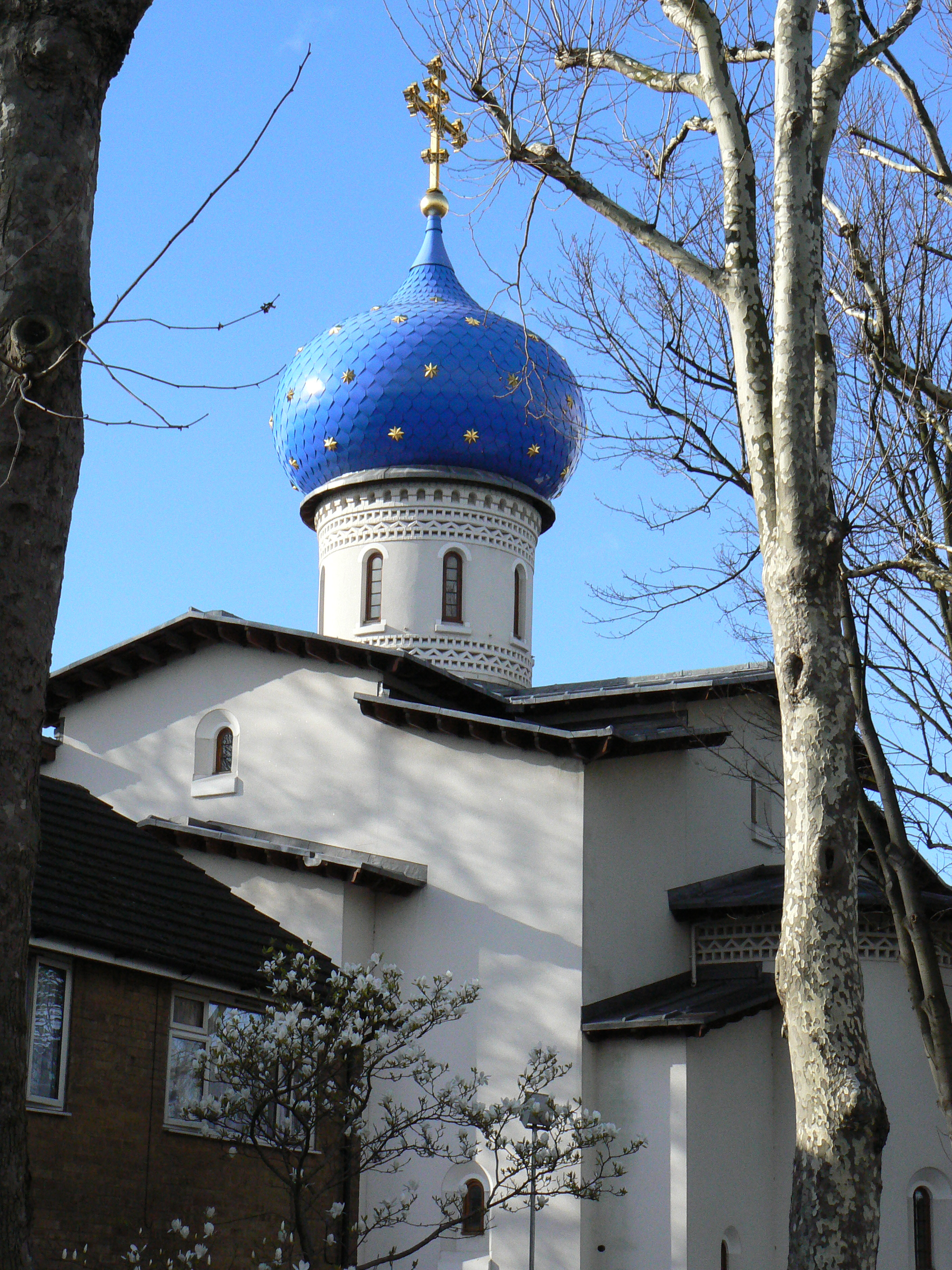
Russian Orthodox Church Abroad, Harvard Road

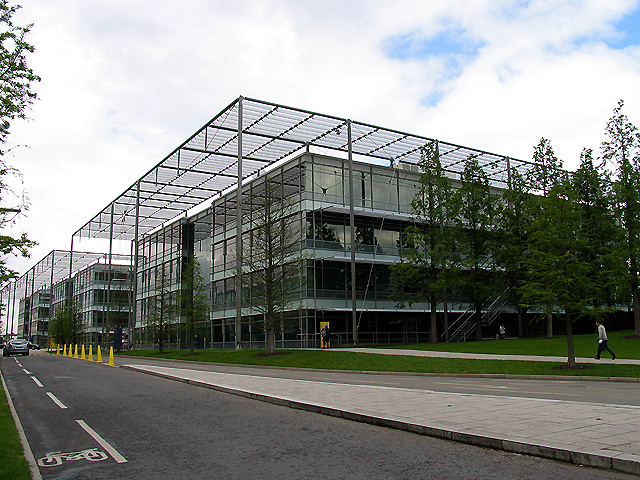
Chiswick Business Park

== Transport ==
=== Nearest tube stations ===
- Acton Town tube station
- Gunnersbury station

=== Nearest railway station ===
- Gunnersbury station
- South Acton railway station
