= Stanhope plc =

Property development company in England

- Type: Limited company
- Industry: Real Estate
- Founded: 1983
- Founder: Stuart Lipton; Peter Rogers
- Headquarters: London
- Area served: England
- Key people: David Camp (CEO)
- Revenue: £32 million (2024)
- Net income: £11 million (2024)
- Parent: AIMCo; Cadillac Fairview (25%); Mitsui Fudosan
- Website: www.stanhopeplc.com

Stanhope plc is a large property development company based in London, England. Its developments have included Broadgate and Television Centre at White City.

== History ==
Stanhope was founded by Stuart Lipton and Peter Rogers in 1983. It pioneered the development of modern offices at Stockley Park in West London which opened in June 1986. At Stanhope, Lipton relied heavily on a key group of advisers including architects Peter Foggo at Arup and Frank Duffy at DEGW. Stanhope was, in a 50:50 joint venture with Rosehaugh, the developer of the Broadgate complex in the 1980s and early 1990s, as well as of the major office scheme near St Paul's Cathedral in Ludgate Place, EC4.

In 1995, the company developed Gresham St Paul's (previously Garrard House) in Gresham Street, London, for Schroders. The company went on to develop Paternoster Square, in partnership with Mitsubishi Estate, in the late 1990s.

In 2000, Stanhope, along with British Gas, Lendlease, Chelsfield plc and Hambros Bank formed Exchequer Partnership plc, a special purpose vehicle, which successfully bid for the PFI contract for the refurbishment of Government Offices Great George Street, London to house HM Treasury.

Lipton sold his share in the company to the chief executive, David Camp, in December 2005. In July 2012, in partnership with Mitsui Fudosan and AIMCo, the company acquired Television Centre at White City for £200 million and, 2019, in partnership with Mitsubishi Estate, the company started work on the 51-storey 8 Bishopsgate tower block.

As at December 2022, AIMCo, Cadillac Fairview and Mitsui Fudosan held a combined 80% of the shares with management owning the remainder.

== Notable projects ==
Notable projects Stanhope has been involved in include:

- BFI IMAX
- Broadgate
- Central Saint Giles
- Chiswick Works redevelopment as Chiswick Business Park
- Gloucester Transport Hub
- Ludgate Place, EC4
- Station Hill, Reading
- Stockley Park
- Television Centre, London
- 8 Bishopsgate
