= Keswick =

Keswick may refer to:

== Places ==
=== Australia ===
- Keswick, South Australia, a suburb of Adelaide
  - Keswick railway station, Adelaide
  - Adelaide Parklands Terminal (formerly Keswick Rail Terminal)

=== Canada ===
- Keswick, Edmonton, Alberta
- Keswick, Ontario
- Keswick, New Brunswick, on the Saint John River near Fredericton
- Keswick Ridge, New Brunswick

=== United Kingdom ===
- Keswick, Cumbria
- Keswick, North Norfolk, part of Bacton
- Keswick, South Norfolk

=== United States ===
- Keswick, California
- Keswick, Iowa
- Keswick, Baltimore, Maryland
- Keswick, Michigan
- Keswick, Pennsylvania, see Keswick Theatre
- Keswick, Virginia
  - Keswick (Powhatan, Virginia), listed on the National Register of Historic Places

== People ==
- Keswick family, descendants of the founders of Jardine Matheson

== Other uses ==
- Keswick Christian School, Florida
- Keswick Convention, an annual gathering of evangelical Christians in Keswick, Cumbria
- Keswick (T.U.F.F. Puppy), a fictional secret agent in the animated series T.U.F.F. Puppy

== See also ==
- Cheswick (disambiguation)
- Chiswick (disambiguation)
