= Chiswick (ship) =

Several ships have been named Chiswick for Chiswick:

- Chiswick (1799 ship) (or Cheswick) was built at Batavia for Dutch owners but quickly fell into British hands. She became a West Indiaman. The French captured her but she quickly returned to British hands. She was wrecked at Aux Cayes in 1809.
- Chiswick, a steamship of 1,261grt, ran aground on 5 February 1891 in calm weather on the northeast ledges of the Seven Stones Reef. The captain and ten crew drowned; the Sevenstones Lightship's lifeboat picked up eight survivors.
