= Third rail =

Method of providing electric power to a railway train

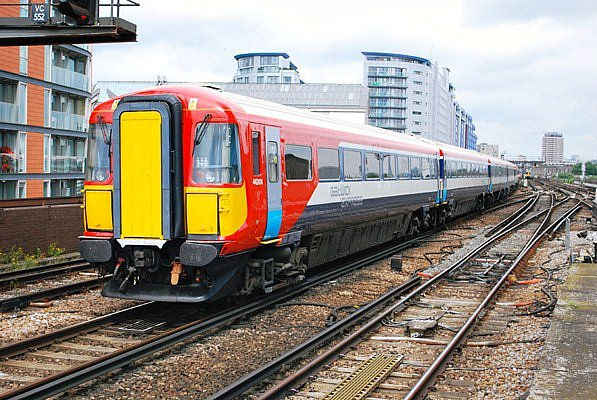
A British Rail Class 442 third-rail electric multiple unit in Battersea. The Class 442 holds the speed record for a third-rail EMU, being set at 109 mph (175 km/h).

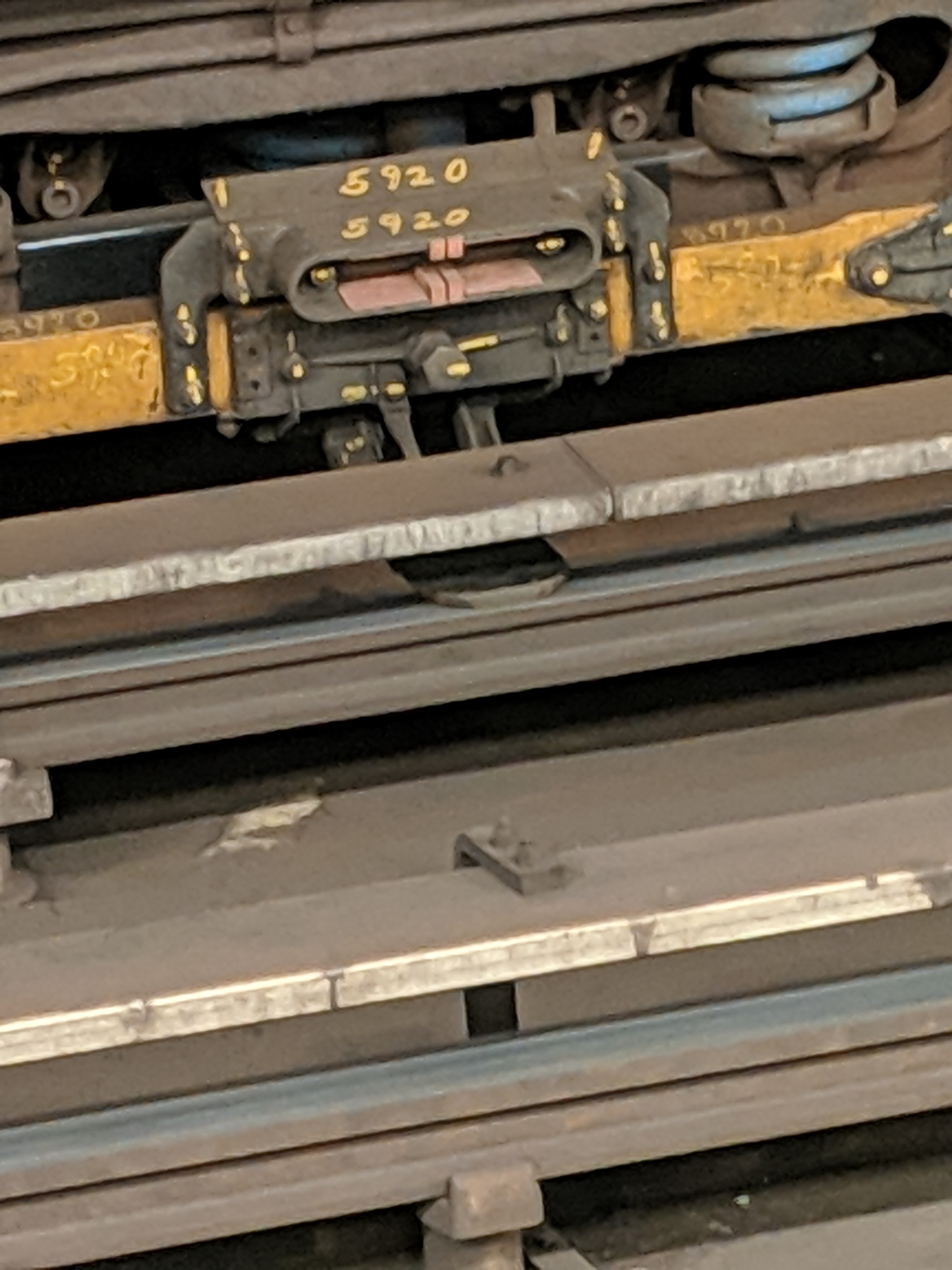
The contact shoe of a New York City Subway car making contact with the third rail. In the foreground is the third rail for the adjacent track.

A third rail, also known as a conductor rail, electric rail, live rail, or power rail, is a method of providing electric power to a railway locomotive or train, through a semi-continuous rigid conductor placed alongside or between the rails of a railway track. It is used typically in a mass transit or rapid transit system, which has alignments in its own corridors, fully or almost fully segregated from the outside environment. Third-rail systems are usually supplied with direct current.

Modern tram systems with street running avoid the electrical injury risk of the exposed electric rail by implementing a segmented ground-level power supply, where each segment is electrified only while covered by a vehicle which is using its power.

The system is generally associated with a low voltage (rarely above 750 V) and is far less used for main lines than overhead line which, with a higher voltage, permit more distance between the substations. Also, for safety reasons, third-rail systems are generally fully grade-separated. Third rail found its niche in metro systems, where a smaller tunnel is more important than having fewer substations; however, some main lines use third rail, like lines in Southern England, Merseyrail, Long Island Rail Road, Hudson and Harlem lines of Metro North Railroad, and Mitre, Sarmiento, and Urquiza lines in Greater Buenos Aires.

== Description ==
Third-rail systems are a means of providing electric traction power to trains using an additional rail (called a "conductor rail") for the purpose. On most systems, the conductor rail is placed on the sleeper ends outside the running rails, but in some systems a central conductor rail is used. The conductor rail is supported on ceramic insulators (known as "pots"), at top contact or insulated brackets, at bottom contact, typically at intervals of around 10 feet (3.0 m).

The trains have metal contact blocks called collector shoes (also known as contact shoes or pickup shoes) which make contact with the conductor rail. The traction current is returned to the generating station through the running rails. In North America, the conductor rail is usually made of high-conductivity steel or steel bolted to aluminium to increase the conductivity. Elsewhere in the world, extruded aluminium conductors with stainless steel contact surface or cap, is the preferred technology due to its lower electrical resistance, longer life, and lighter weight. The running rails are electrically connected using wire bonds or other devices, to minimise resistance in the electric circuit. Contact shoes can be positioned below, above, or beside the third rail, depending on the type of third rail used: these third rails are referred to as bottom-contact, top-contact, or side-contact, respectively.

The conductor rails have to be interrupted at level crossings, crossovers, and substation gaps. Tapered rails are provided at the ends of each section to allow a smooth engagement of the train's contact shoes.

The position of contact between the train and the rail varies: some of the earliest systems used top contact, but later developments use side or bottom contact, which enabled the conductor rail to be covered, protecting track workers from accidental contact and protecting the conductor rail from frost, ice, snow and leaf-fall.

=== Gallery ===
Descriptions

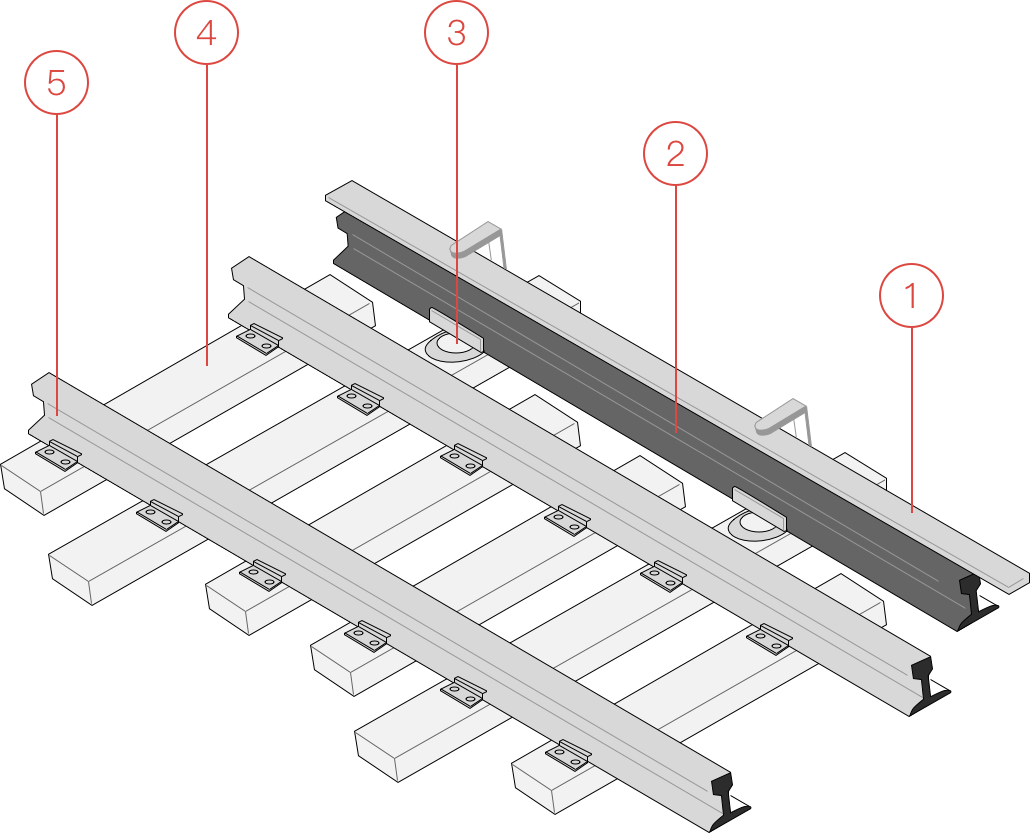
Third rail layout:
1: coverboard 2: power rail 3: insulator 4: sleeper 5: rail

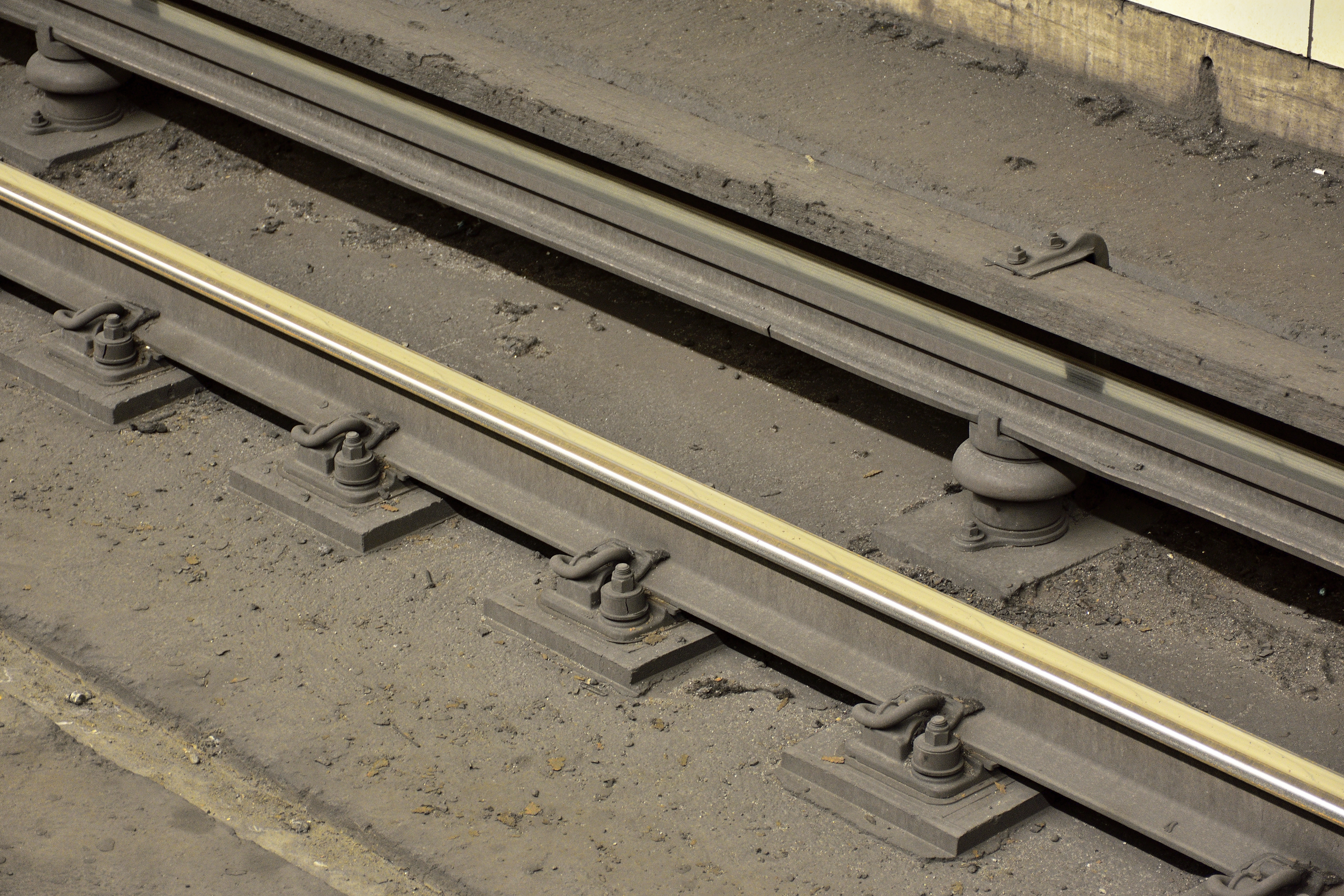
Third rail (top) at Bloor-Yonge station (Line 1) on the Toronto subway. Energized at 600 volts DC, the third rail provides electrical power to the power-train, and ancillaries of the subway cars.

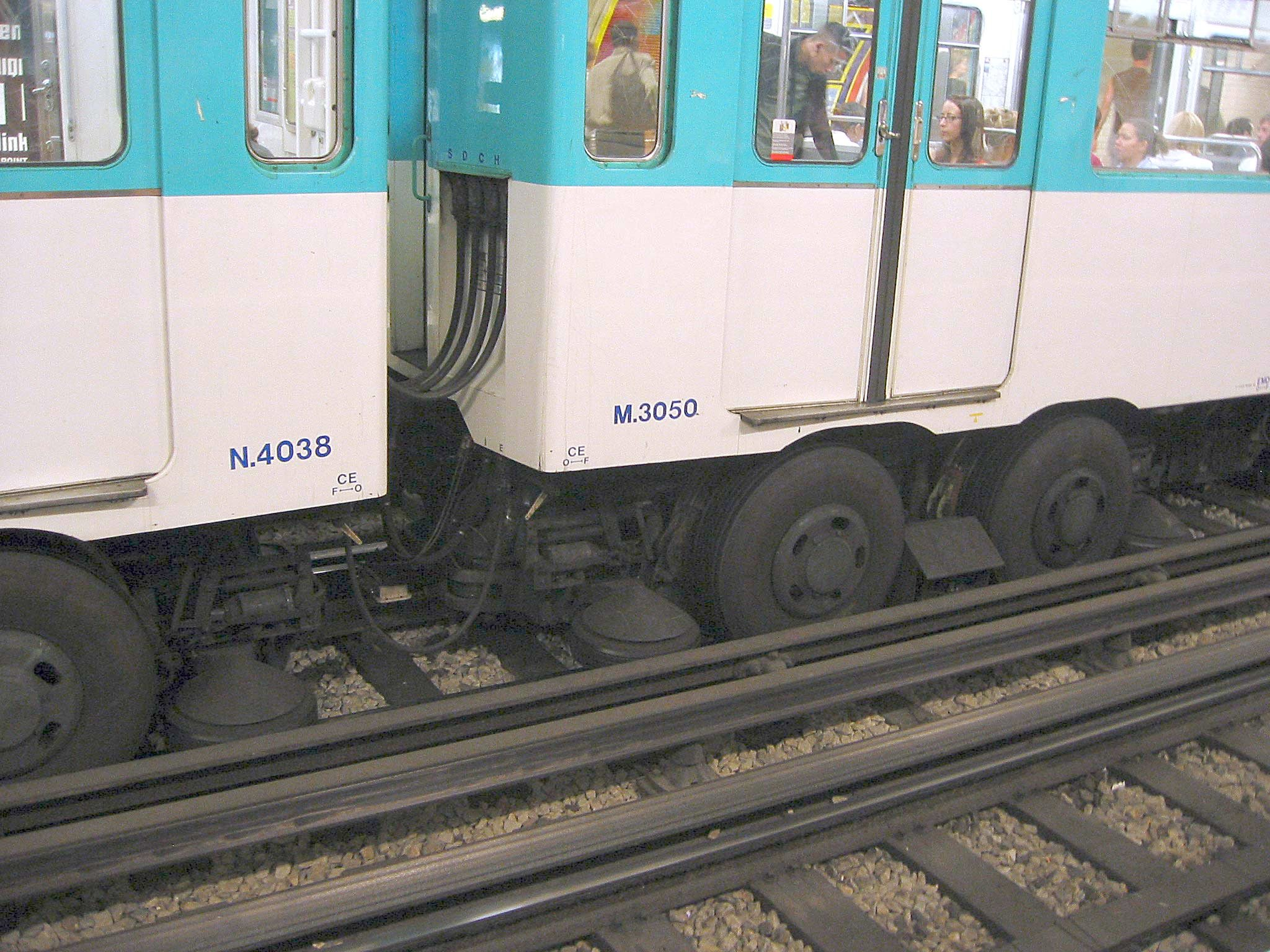
Paris Métro. The guide rails on the rubber-tyred lines also function as current conductors. The horizontal contact shoe is between the pair of rubber wheels.

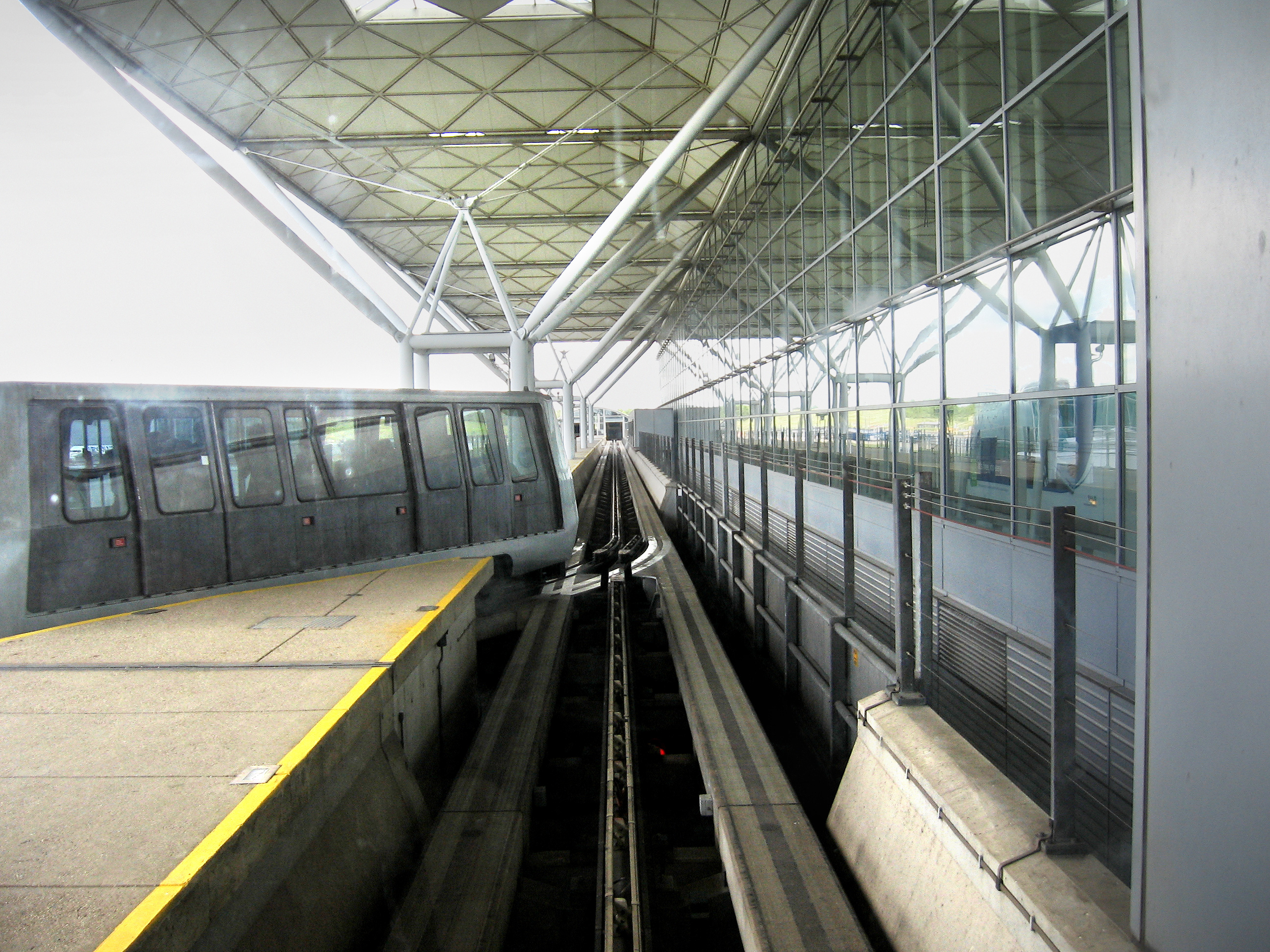
London Stansted Airport people mover, showing rail switch

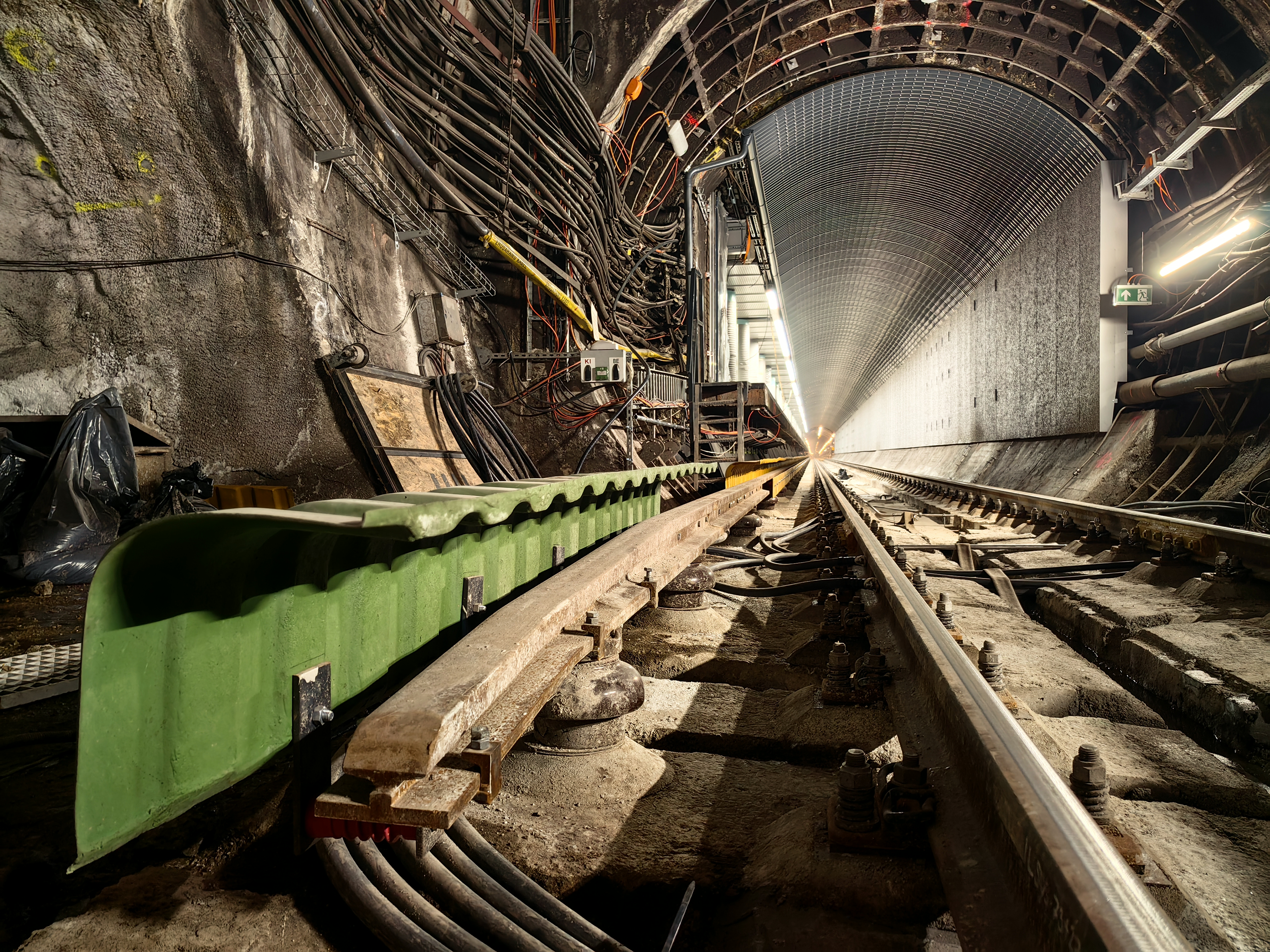
Budapest Metro

== Advantages and disadvantages ==
=== Structure gauge ===
For the same vehicle size, third-rail electrification requires a smaller vertical structure gauge as compared to overhead line electrification. This consideration becomes especially important for urban underground railways, where a smaller structure gauge allows for smaller tunnel cross sections and corresponding savings on construction cost.

=== Safety ===
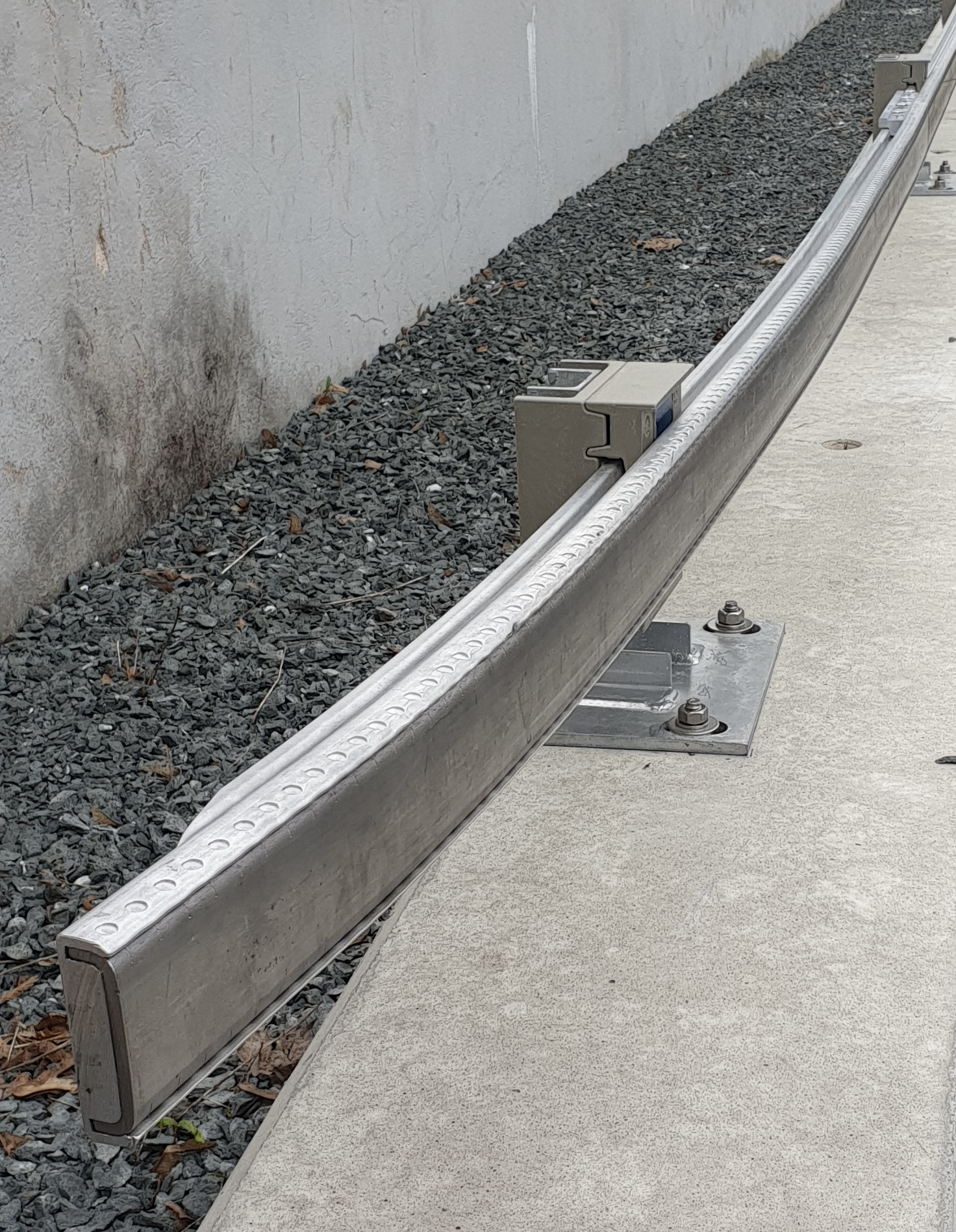
Entry ramp for side-contact third rail.

Because third-rail systems, which are close to the ground, present electric shock and fire hazards, high voltages (above 1500 V) are not considered safe. A very high current must therefore be used to supply adequate power to the train, resulting in high resistive losses, and requiring relatively closely spaced feed points from lineside electrical substations.

The electric conductor rail is a hazard to anyone on the tracks. The risks can be mitigated by using platform screen doors, or by placing the conductor rail on the side of the track away from the platform edge, where allowed by the station layout, or by covering the conductor rail with a coverboard, a long wooden plank or plastic cover supported by brackets. However, coverboards often cannot be used because they reduce the structure gauge near the top of the rail and thereby also the loading gauge. In the United States, Chicago "L" and MBTA Subway third rails are not covered.

There is also a risk of pedestrians walking onto the tracks at level crossings and touching the third rail, unless grade separation is fully implemented. In the United States, a 1992 Supreme Court of Illinois decision affirmed a $1.5 million verdict against the Chicago Transit Authority for failing to stop an intoxicated person from walking onto the tracks at a level crossing at the Kedzie station in an apparent attempt to urinate.

The end ramps of conductor rails (where they are interrupted, or change sides) present a practical limitation on speed due to the mechanical impact of the shoe, and 161 km/h (100 mph) is considered the upper limit of practical third-rail operation. The world speed record for a third-rail train is 175 km/h (109 mph) attained on 11 April 1988 by a British Class 442 EMU.

In the event of a collision with a foreign object, the bevelled end ramps of bottom-running systems can facilitate the hazard of having the third rail penetrate the interior of a passenger car. This is believed to have contributed to the death of five passengers in the Valhalla train crash of 2015.

Modern systems, such as ground-level power supply (first used in the tramway of Bordeaux in 2003), avoid the safety problem by segmenting the powered rail, with each segment being powered only when completely covered by the vehicle which utilizes its power.

=== Weather effects ===
Third-rail systems using top contact are prone to accumulations of snow, or ice formed from refrozen snow, and this can interrupt operations. Some systems operate dedicated de-icing trains to deposit an oily fluid or antifreeze (such as propylene glycol) on the conductor rail to prevent the frozen build-up. The third rail can also be heated to alleviate the problem of ice.

Unlike overhead line equipment, third-rail systems are not susceptible to strong winds or freezing rain, which can bring down overhead wires and hence disable all trains. Thunderstorms can also disable the power with lightning strikes on systems with overhead wires, disabling trains if there is a power surge or a break in the wires.

=== Gaps ===
Depending on train and track geometry, gaps in the conductor rail (e.g., at level crossings and junctions) could allow a train to stop in a position where all of its power pickup shoes are in gaps, so that no traction power is available. The train is then said to be "gapped". Another train must then be brought up behind the stranded train to push it on to the conductor rail, or a jumper cable may be used to supply enough power to the train to get one of its contact shoes back on the live rail. Avoiding this problem requires a minimum length of trains that can be run on a line. Locomotives have either had the backup of an on-board diesel engine system (e.g., British Rail Class 73), or have been connected to shoes on the rolling stock (e.g. Metropolitan Railway).

=== Running rails for power supply ===
The first idea for feeding electricity to a train from an external source was by using both rails on which a train runs, whereby each rail is a conductor for each polarity, and is insulated by the sleepers. This method is used by most scale model trains; however, it does not work as well for large trains as the sleepers are not good insulators. Furthermore, the electric connection requires insulated wheels or insulated axles, but most insulation materials have poor mechanical properties compared with metals used for this purpose, leading to a less stable train vehicle. Nevertheless, it was sometimes used at the beginning of the development of electric trains. The oldest electric railway in the world, Volk's Railway in Brighton, England, was originally electrified at 50 volts DC using this system (it is now a three-rail system). Other railway systems that used it were the Gross-Lichterfelde Tramway and the Ungerer Tramway.

=== Shoe contact ===
The third rail is usually located outside the two running rails, but on some systems it is mounted between them. The electricity is transmitted to the train by means of a sliding shoe, which is held in contact with the rail. On many systems, an insulating cover is provided above the third rail to protect employees working near the track; sometimes the shoe is designed to contact the side (called "side running") or bottom (called "bottom running" or "under-running") of the third rail, allowing the protective cover to be mounted directly to its top surface. When the shoe slides along the top surface, it is referred to as "top running". When the shoe slides along the bottom surface, it is less affected by the build-up of snow, ice, or leaves, and reduces the chances of a person being electrocuted by coming in contact with the rail. Examples of systems using under-running third rail include Metro-North in the New York metropolitan area; the SEPTA Market–Frankford Line in Philadelphia; and London's Docklands Light Railway.

==== Contact shoe gallery ====
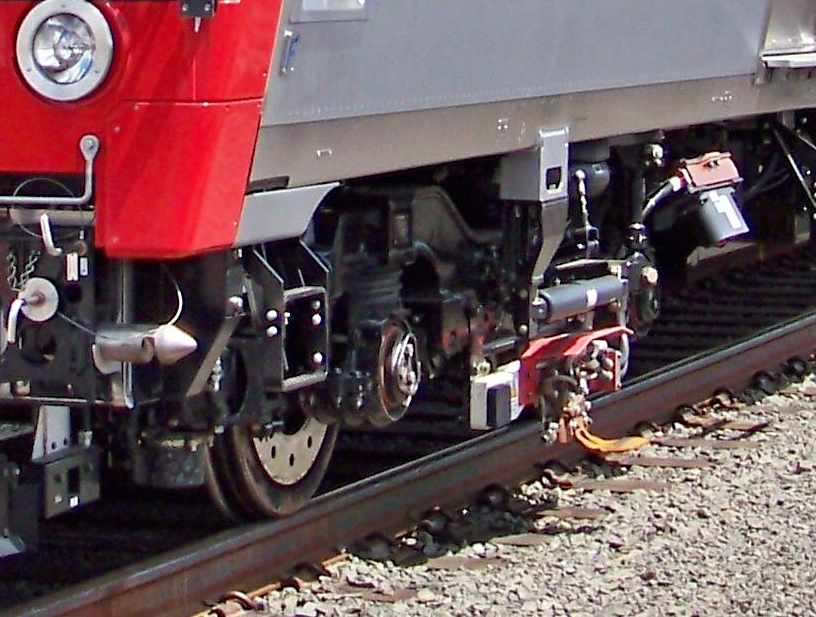
Contact shoe on Metro-North M8 railcar, designed for both over- and under-running third rail.

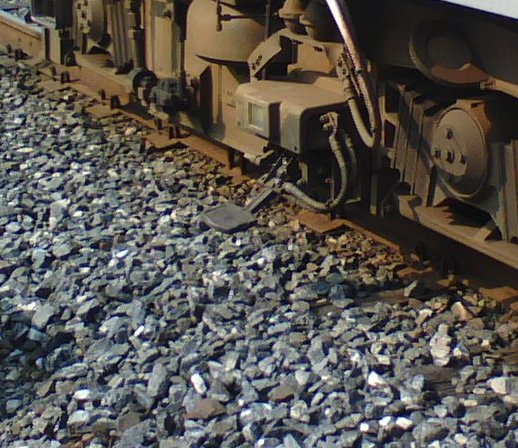
A contact shoe for top-contact third rail on SEPTA's Norristown High Speed Line (third rail not visible)

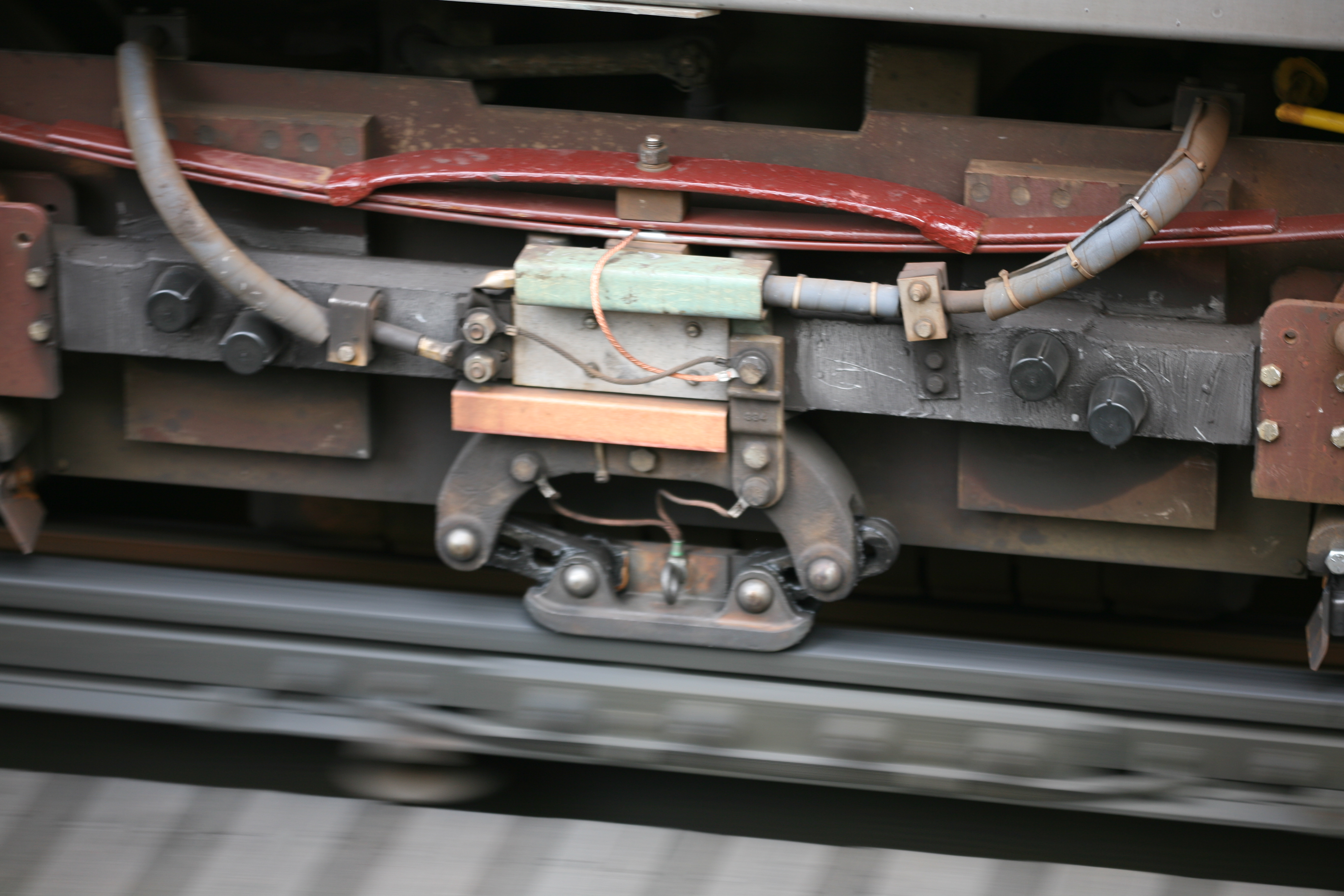
Third rail contact shoe of CTA Chicago "L" subway car

=== Electrical considerations and alternative technologies ===
Electric traction trains (using electric power generated at a remote power station and transmitted to the trains) are considerably more cost-effective than diesel or steam units, where separate power units must be carried on each train. This advantage is especially marked in urban and rapid transit systems with a high traffic density.

Because of mechanical limitations on the contact to the third rail, trains that use this method of power supply achieve lower speeds than those using overhead electric wires and a pantograph. Nevertheless, they may be preferred inside cities as there is no need for very high speed and they cause less visual pollution.

The third rail is an alternative to overhead lines that transmit power to trains by means of pantographs attached to the trains. Whereas overhead-wire systems can operate at 25 kV or more, using alternating current (AC), the smaller clearance around a live rail imposes a maximum of about 1200 V, with some systems using 1500 V (Line 4, Guangzhou Metro, Line 5, Guangzhou Metro, Line 3, Shenzhen Metro), and direct current (DC) is used. Trains on some lines or networks use both power supply modes (see § Mixed systems below).

All third-rail systems throughout the world are energised with DC supplies. Some of the reasons for this are historical. Early traction engines were DC motors, and the then-available rectifying equipment was large, expensive and impractical to install onboard trains. Also, transmission of the relatively high currents required results in higher losses with AC than DC. Substations for a DC system will have to be (typically) about 2 kilometres (1.2 miles) apart, though the actual spacing depends on the carrying capacity, maximum speed, and service frequency of the line.

One method for reducing current losses (and thus increase the spacing of feeder/substations, a major cost in third-rail electrification) is to use a composite conductor rail of a hybrid aluminium/steel design. The aluminium is a better conductor of electricity, and a running face of stainless steel gives better wear.

There are several ways of attaching the stainless steel to the aluminium. The oldest is a co-extruded method, where the stainless steel is extruded with the aluminium. This method has suffered, in isolated cases, from de-lamination (where the stainless steel separates from the aluminium); this is said to have been eliminated in the latest co-extruded rails. A second method is an aluminium core, upon which two stainless steel sections are fitted as a cap and linear welded along the centre line of the rail. Because aluminium has a higher coefficient of thermal expansion than steel, the aluminium and steel must be positively locked to provide a good current collection interface. A third method rivets aluminium bus strips to the web of the steel rail.

=== Return current mechanisms ===
As with overhead wires, the return current usually flows through one or both running rails, and leakage to ground is not considered serious. Where trains run on rubber tyres, as on parts of the Lyon Metro, Paris Métro, Mexico City Metro, Santiago Metro, Sapporo Municipal Subway, and on all of the Montreal Metro and some automated guideway transit systems (e.g. the Astram Line), a live rail must be provided to feed the current. The return is effected through the rails of the conventional track between these guide bars (see rubber-tyred metro).

Another design, with a third rail (current feed, outside the running rails) and fourth rail (current return, midway between the running rails), is used by a few steel-wheel systems. The London Underground is the largest of these (see railway electrification in Great Britain). The main reason for using the fourth rail to carry the return current is to avoid this current flowing through the original metal tunnel linings which were never intended to carry current, and which would suffer electrolytic corrosion should such currents flow in them.

Another four-rail system is line M1 of the Milan Metro, where current is drawn by a lateral, flat bar with side contact, with return via a central rail with top contact. Along some sections on the northern part of the line an overhead line is also in place, to allow line M2's trains (that use pantographs and higher voltage, and have no contact shoes) to access a depot located on line M1. In depots, line M1 trains use pantographs because of safety reasons, with transition made near the depots away from revenue tracks.

=== Aesthetic considerations ===
Third-rail electrification is less visually obtrusive than overhead electrification.

== Mixed systems ==
Several systems use a third rail for part of the route, and other motive power such as overhead catenary or diesel power for the remainder. These may exist because of the connection of separately owned railways using the different motive systems, local ordinances, or other historical reasons.

=== United Kingdom ===
Several types of British trains have operated on both overhead and third-rail systems, including British Rail Class 313, 319, 325, 350, 365, 375/6, 377/2, 377/5, 377/7, 378/2, 387, 373, 395, 700, and 717 EMUs, as well as Class 92 locomotives.

Network Rail claims to run the world's largest third-rail network.

On the Southern Region of British Rail, freight yards had overhead wires to avoid the electrocution hazards of a third rail. The locomotives were fitted with a pantograph as well as pick-up shoes.

==== Eurostar/High Speed 1 ====
The Class 373 used for international high-speed rail services operated by Eurostar through the Channel Tunnel runs on overhead wires at 25 kV AC for most of its journey, with sections of 3 kV DC on Belgian lines between the Belgian high-speed section and Brussels Midi station or 1.5 kV DC on the railway lines in the south of France for seasonal services. As originally delivered, the Class 373 units were additionally fitted with 750 V DC collection shoes, designed for the journey in London via the suburban commuter lines to Waterloo. A switch between third-rail and overhead collection was performed while still moving at speed, initially at Continental Junction near Folkestone, and later on at Fawkham Junction after the opening of the first section of the Channel Tunnel Rail Link. Between Kensington Olympia railway station and North Pole depot, further switchovers were necessary.

However, the dual-voltage system did cause some problems. Failure to retract the shoes when going into France caused severe damage to the trackside equipment, causing SNCF to install a pair of concrete blocks at the Calais end of both tunnels to break off the third rail shoes if they had not been retracted. An accident occurred in the UK when a Eurostar driver failed to lower the pantograph before entering the third-rail system, damaging a signal gantry and the pantograph.

On 14 November 2007, Eurostar's passenger operations were transferred to St Pancras railway station and maintenance operations to Temple Mills depot, making the 750 V DC third rail collection equipment redundant and the third rail shoes were removed. The trains themselves no longer have a speedometer showing the speed in miles per hour (the indication used to automatically change when the collector shoes were deployed).

In 2009, Southeastern began operating domestic services over High Speed 1 trackage from St Pancras using its new Class 395 EMUs. These services operate on the High Speed line as far as Ebbsfleet International or Ashford International, before transferring to the main lines to serve north and mid Kent. As a consequence, these trains are dual-voltage enabled, as the majority of the routes along which they travel are third-rail electrified.

==== North London Line ====
In London, the North London Line changes from third rail to overhead electrification between Richmond and Stratford at Acton Central. The entire route originally used third rail, but several technical electrical earthing problems, plus the fact that there are already overhead electric wires on part of the route for freight and Regional Eurostar services, led to the change.

==== West London Line ====
Also in London, the West London Line changes power supply between Shepherd's Bush and Willesden Junction, where it meets the North London Line. South of the changeover point, the WLL is third-rail electrified; north of there, it is overhead.

==== Thameslink ====
The cross-city Thameslink service runs on the Southern Region third rail network from Farringdon southward and on overhead line northward to Bedford, Cambridge, and Peterborough. The changeover is made while stationary at Farringdon when heading southbound, and at City Thameslink when heading northbound.

==== Northern City ====
On the Moorgate to Hertford and Welwyn suburban service routes, the East Coast Main Line sections are 25 kV AC, with a changeover to third rail made at Drayton Park railway station. A third rail is still used in the tunnel section of the route, because the size of the tunnels leading to Moorgate station was too small to allow for overhead electrification.

==== North Downs Line ====
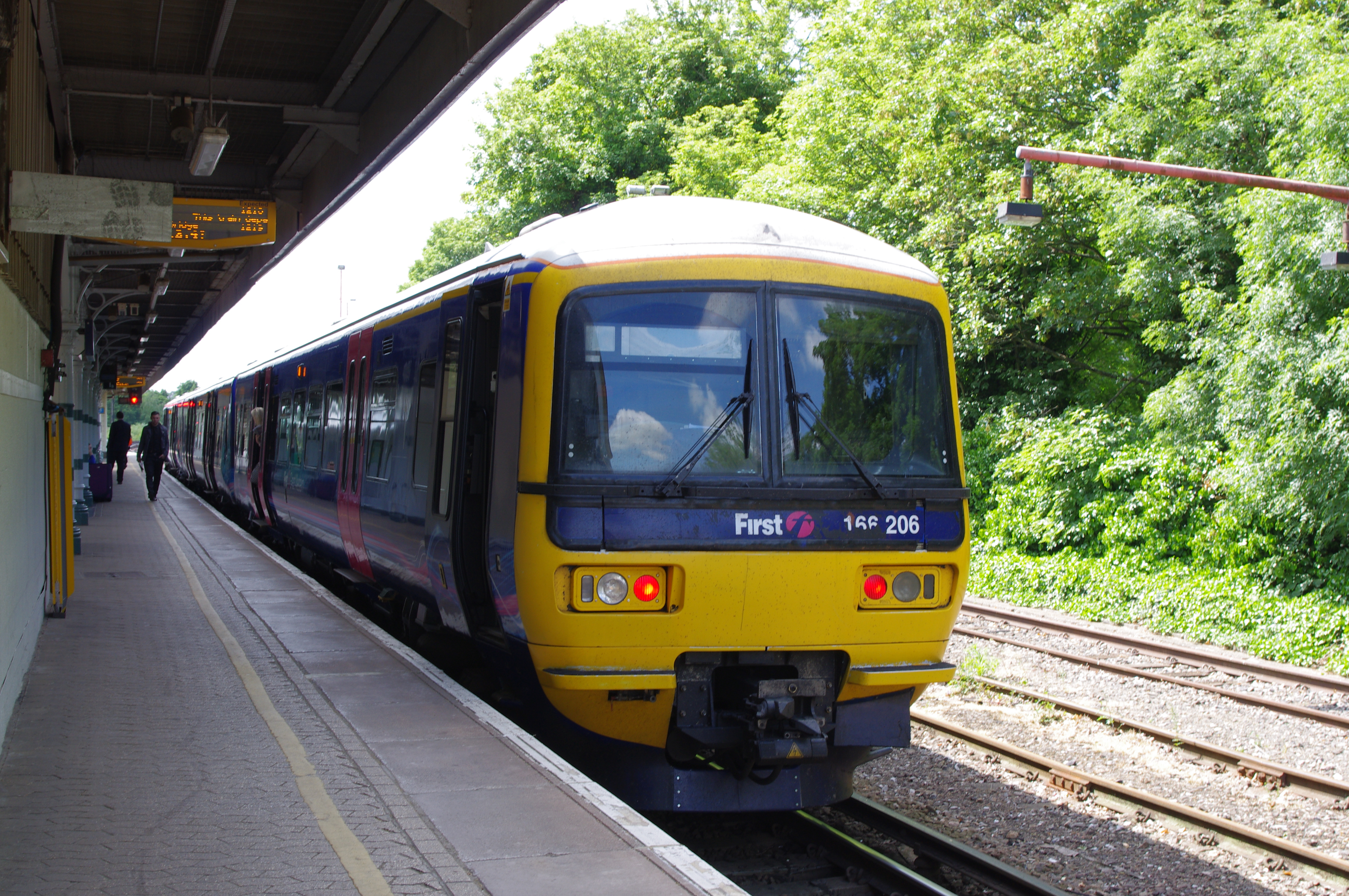
Redhill with the diesel Class 166 service run by First Great Western to Reading as the North Downs Line only has third-rail electrification on shared sections.

The North Downs Line is not electrified on those parts of the line where the North Downs service has exclusive use.

The electrified portions of the line are:

- Redhill to Reigate – Allows Southern Railway services to run to Reigate. This saves having to turn around terminating services at Redhill where due to the station layout, as the reversal would block nearly all the running lines.
- Shalford Junction to Aldershot South Junction – line shared with South Western Railway electric Portsmouth and Aldershot services.
- Wokingham to Reading – line shared with South Western Railway electric services from Waterloo.

=== France ===
The new tramway in Bordeaux (France) uses a novel system with a third rail in the centre of the track. The third rail is separated into 10 m (32 ft 9 3/4 in) long conducting and 3 m (9 ft 10 1/8 in) long isolation segments. Each conducting segment is attached to an electronic circuit which will make the segment live once it lies fully beneath the tram (activated by a coded signal sent by the train) and switch it off before it becomes exposed again. This system (called Alimentation par Sol (APS), meaning 'current supply via ground') is used in various locations around the city but especially in the historic centre: elsewhere the trams use the conventional overhead lines (see also ground-level power supply). In summer 2006 it was announced that two new French tram systems would be using APS over part of their networks. These will be Angers and Reims, with both systems expected to open around 2009–2010.

The French Culoz–Modane railway was electrified with 1500 V DC third rail, later converted to overhead wires at the same voltage. Stations had overhead wires from the beginning.

The French branch line which serves Chamonix and the Mont Blanc region (Saint-Gervais-le-Fayet to Vallorcine) is third rail (top contact) and metre gauge. It continues in Switzerland, partly with the same third-rail system, partly with an overhead line.

The 63 km (39 mi) long Train Jaune line in the Pyrenees also features a third rail.

Many suburban lines that ran out of the Paris Saint Lazare station used third-rail (bottom contact) feed.

=== Netherlands ===
To mitigate investment costs, the Rotterdam Metro, a third-rail-powered system, has sections on outlying branches built on surface tracks as light rail (called sneltram in Dutch), with numerous level crossings protected with barriers and traffic lights. These branches have overhead wires. The RandstadRail project also requires Rotterdam Metro trains to run under wires along the former mainline railways to The Hague and Hook of Holland.

Similarly, in Amsterdam one sneltram route went on Metro tracks and passed to surface alignment in the suburbs, where it shared tracks with standard trams. In Amsterdam, the Sneltram lightrail uses a third rail and switches to overhead wires when it moves onto the traditional tramway shared with trams in Amsterdam. Line 51 to Amstelveen ran metro service between Amsterdam Centraal and Station Zuid. At Amsterdam Zuid it switched from third rail to pantograph and catenary wires. From there to Amstelveen Centrum it shared its tracks with tram line 5. The light rail vehicles on this line were capable of using both 600 V DC and 750 V DC. As of March 2019 this metro line has been decommissioned, partly because of issues regarding switching between third rail and overhead wires. Its line number 51 has been assigned to a new metro line running partly the same route from Amsterdam Central railway station to Station Zuid and then following the same route as metro line 50 to Amsterdam Sloterdijk railway station.

=== United States ===
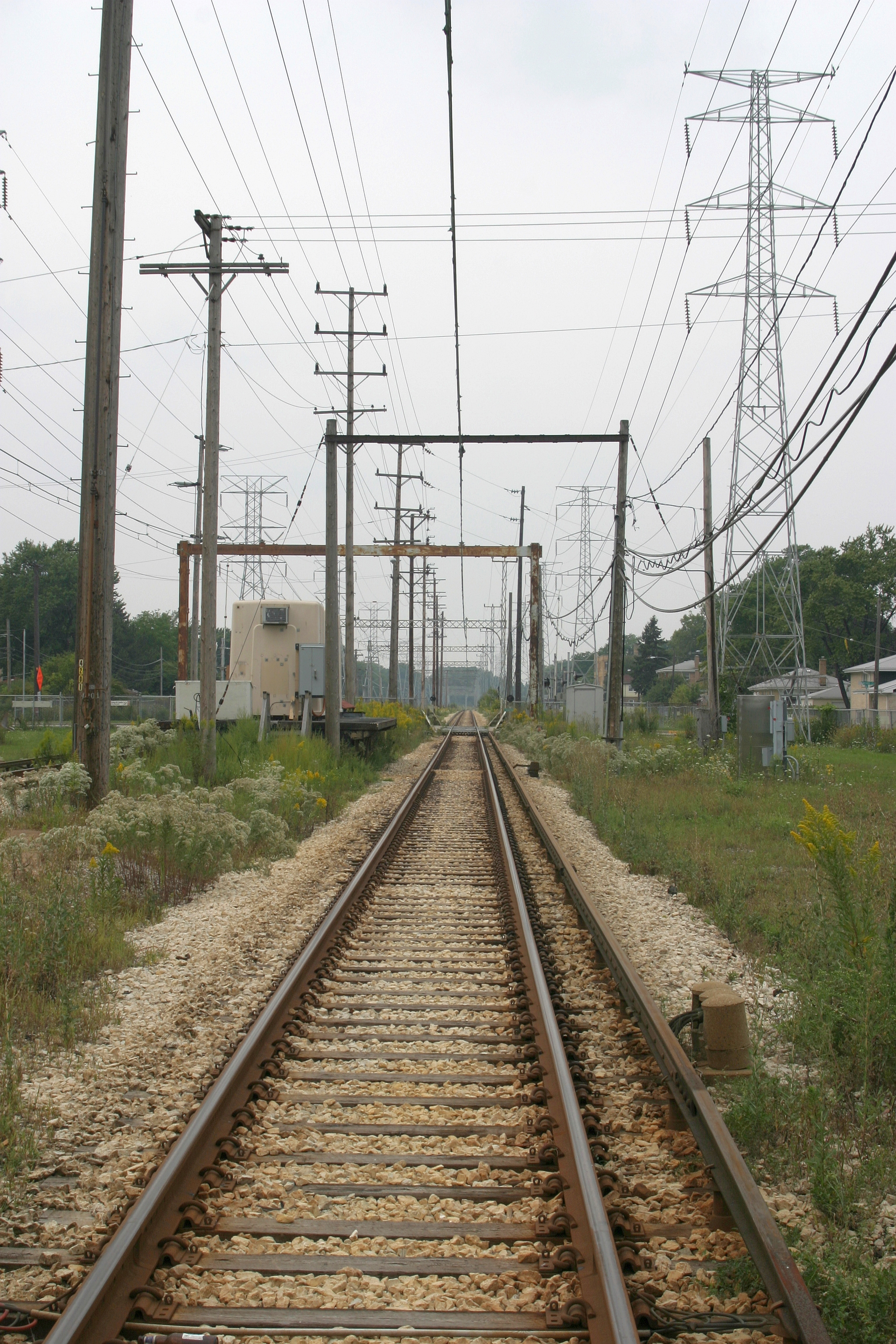
Third rail to overhead wire transition zone on the Skokie Swift

In New York City, the New Haven Line of Metro–North Railroad operates electric trains out of Grand Central Terminal that use third rail on the former New York Central Railroad but switch to overhead lines in Pelham to operate out onto the former New York, New Haven and Hartford Railroad. The switch is made "on the fly" (at speed), and controlled from the engineer's position.

The main two stations in New York City – Grand Central and Pennsylvania Station – do not permit diesel locomotives to operate in their tunnels due to the health hazard from the exhaust. As such, diesel service on Metro-North, Long Island Rail Road, and Amtrak uses dual-mode/electro-diesel locomotives (the P32AC-DM and the DM30AC) that can use the third-rail power in the stations and approaches. When under third rail operation, these locomotives are less powerful, so on open-air (non-tunnel) trackage the engines typically run in diesel mode, even where third-rail power is available. New Jersey Transit also makes use of ALP-45DP dual mode locomotives for operation into Penn Station alongside their normal electric fleet. However, their dual mode locomotives make use of the overhead power supply instead, as it is available elsewhere on much of their network.

In New York City (on most of the island of Manhattan) and in Washington, D.C., local ordinances once required electrified street railways to draw current from a third rail and return the current to a fourth rail, both installed in a continuous vault underneath the street and accessed by means of a collector that passed through a slot between the running rails. When streetcars on such systems entered territory where overhead lines were allowed, they stopped over a pit where a man detached the collector (plow) and the motorman placed a trolley pole on the overhead. In the US, all these conduit-feed powered systems have been discontinued, and either replaced or abandoned altogether.

Some sections of the former London tram system also used the conduit current collection system, also with some tramcars that could collect power from both overhead and under-road sources.

The Blue Line of Boston's MBTA uses third-rail electrification from the start of the line downtown to Airport station, where it switches to overhead catenary for the remainder of the line to Wonderland station. The outermost section of the Blue Line runs very close to the Atlantic Ocean, and there were concerns about possible snow and ice buildup on a third rail so near to the water. Overhead catenary is not used in the underground section because of tight clearances in the 1904 tunnel under Boston Harbor. The MBTA Orange Line's Hawker Siddeley 01200 series rapid transit cars (essentially a longer version of the Blue Line's 0600s) had their pantograph mounting points removed during a maintenance program midway through their lifespan; these mounts would have been used for pantographs which would have been installed had the Orange Line been extended north of its current terminus.

Dual power supply method was also used on some US interurban railways that made use of newer third rail in suburban areas, and existing overhead streetcar (trolley) infrastructure to reach downtown. For example, the Chicago "L" Yellow Line (which uses tracks originally used by the North Shore Line) used overhead wires on the western half of the route, which transitioned into third rail for the eastern half of the route. The entire line was converted to third rail in 2004 in order to reduce maintenance costs and allow better compatibility with rolling stock.

=== Post-Soviet countries ===
In countries formerly part of the Soviet Union, the third rail is called the contact rail. It is manufactured according to a single standard from low-carbon steel to improve its conductive properties. Current is collected from below, and the third rail is covered above with a plastic casing. The standard length of a contact rail is 12.5 metres. On straight and curved sections with a radius of 300 metres or more in tunnels, contact rails are welded into 100-metre-long strings; on above-ground sections, the string length is 37.5 metres; and on yard tracks and curves with a radius of less than 300 metres, the length is 12.5 metres. The third rail itself is mounted using brackets.

== Simultaneous use with overhead wire ==
A railway can be electrified with an overhead wire and a third rail at the same time. This was the case, for example, on the Hamburg S-Bahn between 1940 and 1955. A modern example is Birkenwerder Railway Station near Berlin, which has third rails on both sides and overhead wires. Most of the Penn Station complex in New York City is also electrified with both systems.

== Non-standard voltages ==
Some high third rail voltages (1000 volts and more) include:

- Hamburg S-Bahn: 1200 V, since 1940
- Manchester–Bury, England: 1200 V (side contact) (Until Metrolink conversion to 750 V overhead in 1991)
- Culoz–Modane railway, France: 1500 V, 1925–1976
- Guangzhou Metro Lines 4 and 5: 1500 V
- Bay Area Rapid Transit, San Francisco: 1000 V
- Paris Métro Line 18: 1500 V

In Nazi Germany, a railway system with a 3,000 mm (9 ft 10 1/8 in) gauge width was planned. For this Breitspurbahn railway system, electrification with a voltage of 100 kV taken from a third rail was considered, in order to avoid damage to overhead wires from oversize rail-mounted anti-aircraft guns. However, such a power system would not have worked as it is not possible to insulate a third rail for such high voltages in close proximity to the rails. The whole project did not progress any further owing to the onset of World War II.

== History ==
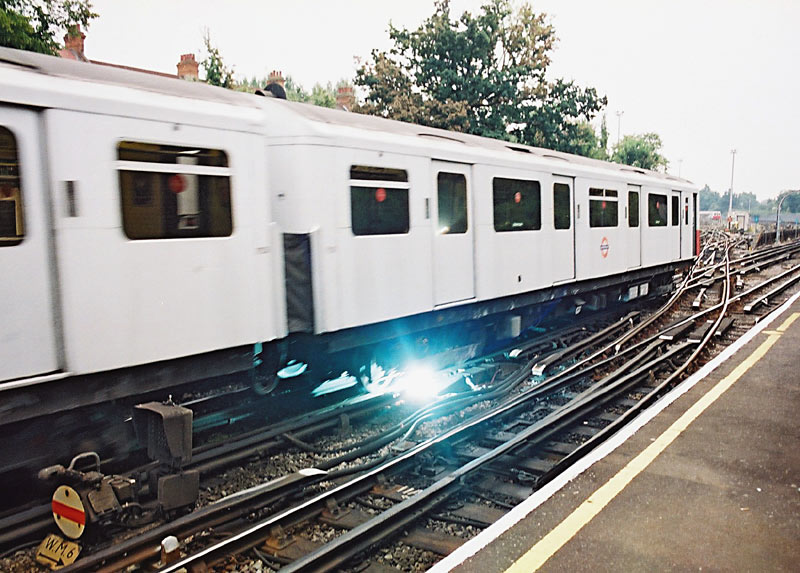
The London Underground uses a four-rail system where both conductor rails are live relative to the running rails, and the positive rail has twice the voltage of the negative rail. Arcs like this are normal and occur when the electric power collection shoes of a train that is drawing power reach the end of a section of conductor rail.

Third-rail electrification systems are, apart from on-board batteries, the oldest means of supplying electric power to trains on railways using their own corridors, particularly in cities. Overhead power supply was initially almost exclusively used on tramway-like railways, though it also appeared slowly on mainline systems.

An experimental electric train using this method of power supply was developed by the German firm of Siemens & Halske and shown at the Berlin Industrial Exposition of 1879, with its third rail between the running rails. Some early electric railways used the running rails as the current conductor, as with the 1883-opened Volk's Electric Railway in Brighton. It was given an additional power rail in 1886, and is still operating. The Giant's Causeway Tramway followed, equipped with an elevated outside third rail in 1883, later converted to overhead wire. The first railway to use the central third rail was the Bessbrook and Newry Tramway in Ireland, opened in 1885 but now, like the Giant's Causeway line, closed.

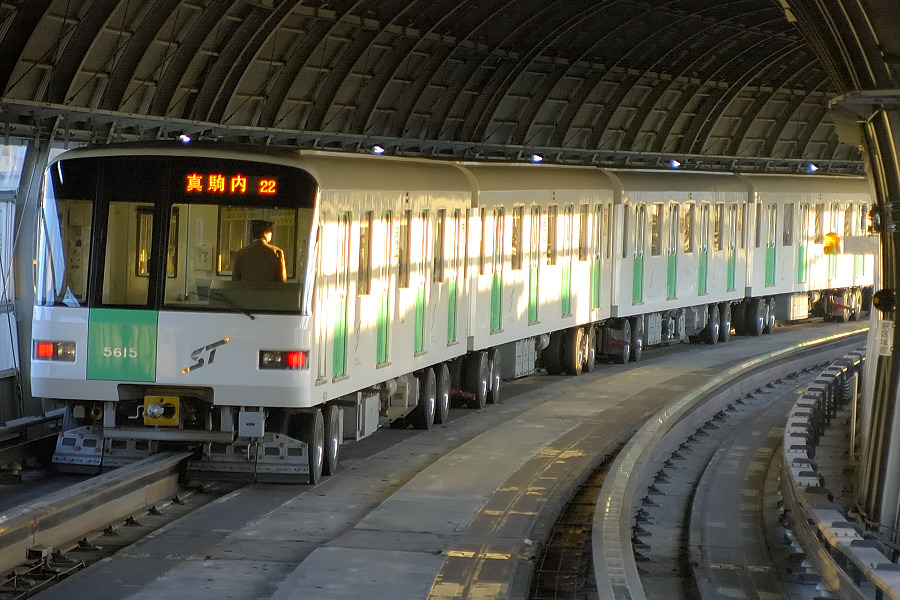
Sapporo Subway with a centrally placed guiding/return rail

Also in the 1880s, third-rail systems began to be used in public urban transport. Trams were first to benefit from it: they used conductors in conduit below the road surface (see conduit current collection), usually on selected parts of the networks. This was first tried in Cleveland (1884) and in Denver (1885) and later spread to many big tram networks (e.g. New York; Chicago; Washington, DC; London; Paris, all of which are closed) and Berlin (the third-rail system in the city was abandoned in the early 20th century after heavy snowfall.) The system was tried in the beachside resort of Blackpool, UK, but was soon abandoned as sand and saltwater were found to enter the conduit and cause breakdowns, and there was a problem with voltage drop. Some sections of tramway track still have the slot rails visible.

A third rail supplied power to the world's first electric underground railway, the City & South London Railway, which opened in 1890 (now part of the Northern line of the London Underground). In 1893, the world's second third-rail powered city railway opened in Britain, the Liverpool Overhead Railway (closed 1956 and dismantled). The first US third-rail powered city railway in revenue use was the 1895 Metropolitan West Side Elevated, which soon became part of the Chicago "L". In 1901, Granville Woods, a prominent African-American inventor, was granted a U.S. patent 687,098, covering various proposed improvements to third-rail systems. This has been cited to claim that he invented the third-rail system of current distribution. However, by that time there had been numerous other patents for electrified third-rail systems, including Thomas Edison's U.S. patent 263,132 of 1882, and third rails had been in successful use for over a decade, in installations including the rest of Chicago "elevateds", as well as those used in Brooklyn Rapid Transit Company, not to mention the development outside the US.

In Paris, a third rail appeared in 1900 in the main-line tunnel connecting the Gare d'Orsay to the rest of the CF Paris-Orléans network. Main-line third-rail electrification was later expanded to some suburban services.

The Woodford haulage system was used on industrial tramways, specifically in quarries and strip mines in the early decades of the 20th century. This used a 250-volt center third rail to power remotely-controlled self-propelled side dump cars. The remote control system was operated like a model railroad, with the third rail divided into multiple blocks that could be set to power, coast, or brake by switches in the control center.

Top contact or gravity type third rail seems to be the oldest form of power collection. Railways pioneering in using less hazardous types of third rail were the New York Central Railroad on the approach to New York's Grand Central Terminal (1907 – another case of a third-rail mainline electrification), Philadelphia's Market–Frankford Line (1907), and the Hochbahn in Hamburg (1912) each had bottom contact rail, also known as the Wilgus-Sprague system. However, the Manchester-Bury Line of the Lancashire & Yorkshire Railway tried side contact rail in 1917. These technologies appeared in wider use only at the turn of the 1920s and in the 1930s on, e.g., large-profile lines of the Berlin U-Bahn, the Berlin S-Bahn and the Moscow Metro. The Hamburg S-Bahn has used a side contact third rail at 1200 V DC since 1939.

In 1956, the world's first rubber-tyred railway line, Line 11 of Paris Metro, opened. The conductor rail evolved into a pair of guiding rails required to keep the bogie in proper position on the new type of track. This solution was modified on the 1971 Namboku Line of Sapporo Subway, where a centrally placed guiding/return rail was used plus one power rail placed laterally as on conventional railways.

In 2004, the third-rail technology at street tram lines was in the new system of Bordeaux (2004). This is a completely new technology (see below).

Third-rail systems are not considered obsolete. There are, however, countries (particularly Japan, South Korea, Spain) more eager to adopt overhead wiring for their urban railways. But at the same time, there were (and still are) many new third-rail systems built elsewhere, including technologically advanced countries (e.g. Copenhagen Metro, Taipei Metro, Wuhan Metro). Bottom-powered railways (it may be too specific to use the term third-rail) are also usually used with systems having rubber-tyred trains, whether it is a heavy metro (except two other lines of Sapporo Subway) or a small capacity people mover (PM). New electrified railway systems tend to use overhead for regional and long-distance systems. Third-rail systems using lower voltages than overhead systems still require many more supply points.

== Model railways ==
In 1906, the Lionel electric trains became the first model trains to use a third rail to power the locomotive. Lionel track uses a third rail in the center, while the two outer rails are electrically connected together. This solved the problem two-rail model trains have when the track is arranged to loop back on itself, as ordinarily this causes a short circuit. (Even if the loop was gapped, the locomotive would create a short and stop as it crossed the gaps.) Lionel electric trains also operate on alternating current. The use of alternating current means that a Lionel locomotive cannot be reversed by changing polarity; instead, the locomotive sequences among several states (forward, neutral, backward, for example) each time it is started.

Märklin three-rail trains use a short pulse at a higher voltage than is used for powering the train, to reverse a relay within the locomotive. Märklin's track does not have an actual third rail; instead, a series of short pins provide the current, taken up by a long "shoe" under the engine. This shoe is long enough to always be in contact with several pins. This is known as the stud contact system and has certain advantages when used on outdoor model railway systems. The ski collector rubs over the studs and thus inherently self cleans. When both track rails are used for the return in parallel there is much less chance of current interruption due to dirt on the line.

Many model train sets today use only two rails, usually associated with Z, N, HO, or G-Gauge systems. These are typically powered by direct current (DC) where the voltage and polarity of the current controls the speed and direction of the DC motor in the train. A growing exception is Digital Command Control (DCC), where bi-polar DC is delivered to the rails at a constant voltage, along with digital signals that are decoded within the locomotive. The bi-polar DC carries digital information to indicate the command and the locomotive that is being commanded, even when multiple locomotives are present on the same track. The aforementioned Lionel O-Gauge system remains popular today as well with its three rail track and AC power implementation.

Some model railroads realistically mimic the third rail configurations of their full-sized counterparts although nearly all do not draw power from the third rail.

== See also ==
- Conduit current collection
- Initial Electrification Experiments NY NH HR
- Ground-level power supply
- Insulator (electricity)
- Light rail#Ground-level power supply
- Linear motor
- List of rail transport systems using third rail
- List of railway electrification systems
- List of suburban and commuter rail systems
- Online electric vehicle
- Overhead conductor rails
- Railway electrification in Great Britain
- Rubber-tyred metro
- Stud contact system
- Third rail (model rail)
