= Cheswick =

Cheswick may refer to:

== Places ==
- Cheswick, Gloucestershire, England
- Cheswick, Northumberland, England
- Cheswick, Pennsylvania, United States

== People ==
- William Cheswick, computer security and networking researcher
- Charles Cheswick, a fictional character in the novel One Flew Over the Cuckoo's Nest

== See also ==
- Chiswick (disambiguation)
- Keswick (disambiguation)
