= Chiswick (1799 ship) =

History

Batavian Republic
- Launched: 1798
- Captured: 1798

Great Britain
- Name: Chiswick
- Namesake: Chiswick
- Acquired: 1799 by purchase of a prize
- Fate: Wrecked 19 July 1808

General characteristics
- Tons burthen: 380, or 387 (bm)
- Propulsion: Sails
- Complement: 45
- Armament: 1799:6 × 4-pounder guns; 1805:20 × 9&12-pounder carronades; 1808:16 × 6-pounder guns
- Notes: Teak-built

Chiswick (or Cheswick) was built at Batavia in the Netherlands East Indies for Dutch owners but quickly fell into British hands. She became a West Indiaman. The French captured her in 1804 but she quickly returned to British hands. She was wrecked at Aux Cayes in 1808. Her loss gave rise to an interesting case in cargo insurance.

== Career ==
Cheswick first appeared in Lloyd's Register (LR) in 1799 with J. Pointer, master, L. Bruce, owner, and trade London–Jamaica.

On 4 December 1803 Chiswick, Pondler, master, sailed from Gravesend for Jamaica. Lloyd's List reported on 1 May 1804 that Chiswick, Pondler, master, had been captured in the West Indies as she was sailing from London to Jamaica. Her captors had sent her into Saint Martin. On 11 or 12 August, however, Chiswick, Williams, master, returned to Gravesend from Saint Kitts. How she returned to British hands is unclear.

Lloyd's Register for 1805 shows Cheswick with J. Ponter, master, changing to J. Kerslake; L.Bruce, owner, changing to Swann & Co.; and trade London–Jamaica changing to Liverpool–Barbados.

Captain James Kerslake acquired a letter of marque on 19 July 1805.

Lloyd's Register for 1808 showed Cheswick with J. Kerslake, master, changing to P. Callan; Swan & Co., owners, changing to Forbes & Co.; and trade Liverpool–Barbados.

== Fate ==
Cheswick, of Liverpool, Callan, master, was wrecked on 19 July 1808 at Aux Cayes in the West Indies. She was on her way from Liverpool to Cap Francois. The Royal Navy fifth rate HMS Diamond salvaged much of her cargo.

== Court case ==
Chiswick carried insurance on her freight from Haiti to Liverpool. After her loss, "Forbes and Another" sued the insurer, Aspinall, for the entire cargo loss, not just the portion aboard Chiswick intended for Liverpool. The case revealed that she had left Liverpool with goods to barter at Haiti for goods to bring back. She had arrived at Jacmel, Haiti, on 4 July 1808 and exchanged some goods for 55 bales of cotton that she would take back. She was on her way to Aux Cayes when she was wrecked. She was still carrying outward-bound cargo when she was wrecked and it was some of this that Diamond had salvaged. Twelve days after the wreck, the salvaged cargo was exchanged for 250 tons of coffee and 100 tons of wood. Forbes & Co. was suing for coverage of the lost outward bound cargo. However, the court ruled that the insurance only covered homeward-bound cargo, i.e., the 55 bales.
