= Chiswick Park Footbridge =

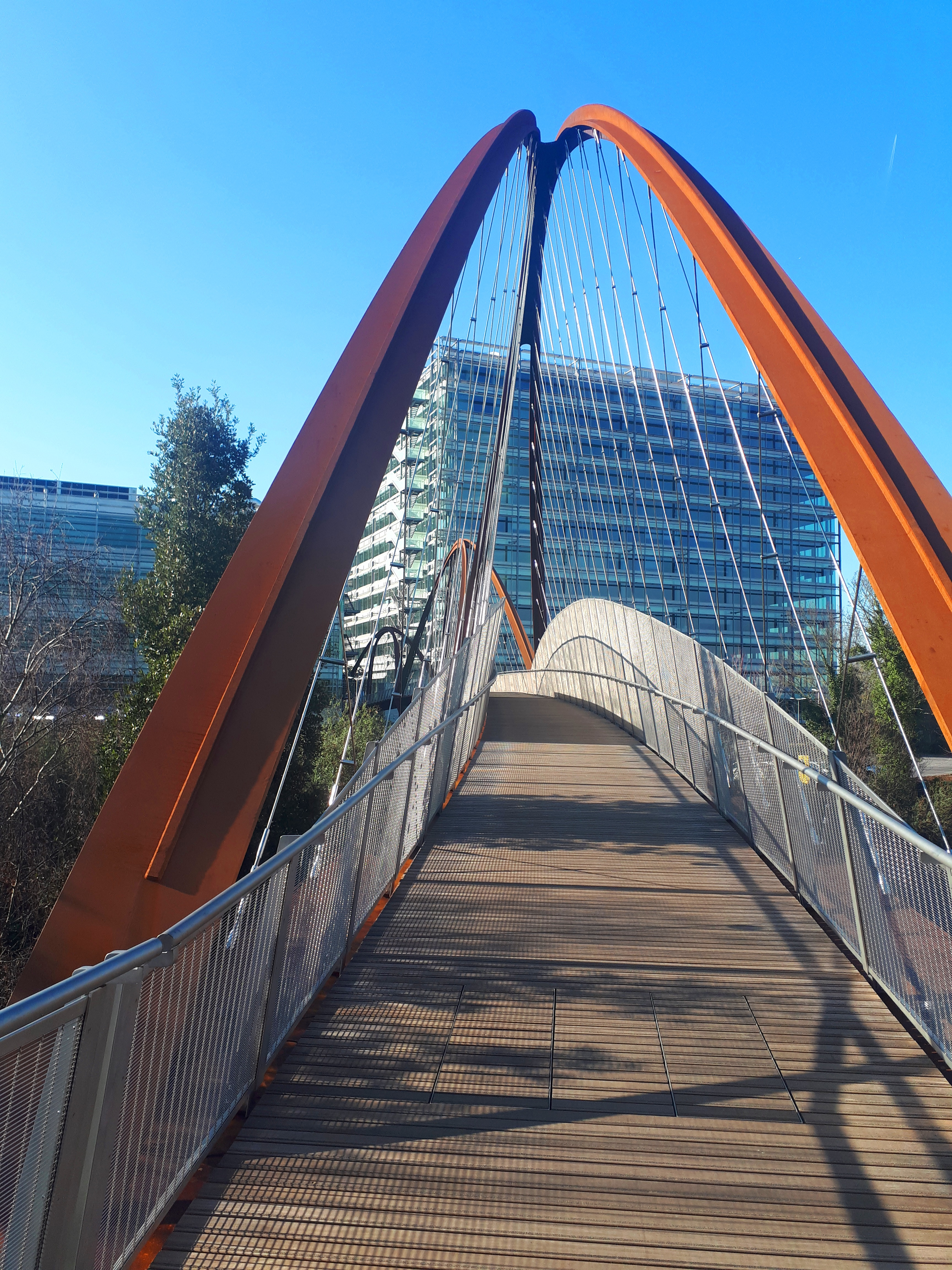
- Coordinates: 51.495934°N 0.272289°W
- Carries: Pedestrian
- Crosses: North London line
- Locale: Chiswick, England

Characteristics
- Design: Arch
- Material: Weathering steel
- Total length: 135 metres
- No. of spans: 3

History
- Designer: Expedition Engineering; Useful Studios
- Constructed by: Lendlease
- Fabrication by: Severfield
- Opened: 24 January 2019

Chiswick Park Footbridge is a pedestrian bridge north of Gunnersbury Triangle Nature Reserve in Chiswick, London that connects Chiswick Business Park with Chiswick Park tube station, crossing a railway line and the adjacent car park.

== Construction ==
The bridge was designed by London-based companies Expedition Engineering and Useful Studios. It has three spans of Corten steel, which weathers to a rust-orange colour, requiring no painting. The walking surface is made of hardwood, and the balustrade is of stainless steel. It was constructed by Lendlease and cost seven million pounds. It opened on 24 January 2019. The bridge won in the best infrastructure category in the 2019 AJ Architecture Awards.
