= Stockley Park =

Suburban business and public park in the United Kingdom

Coordinates: 51.510°N 0.444°W

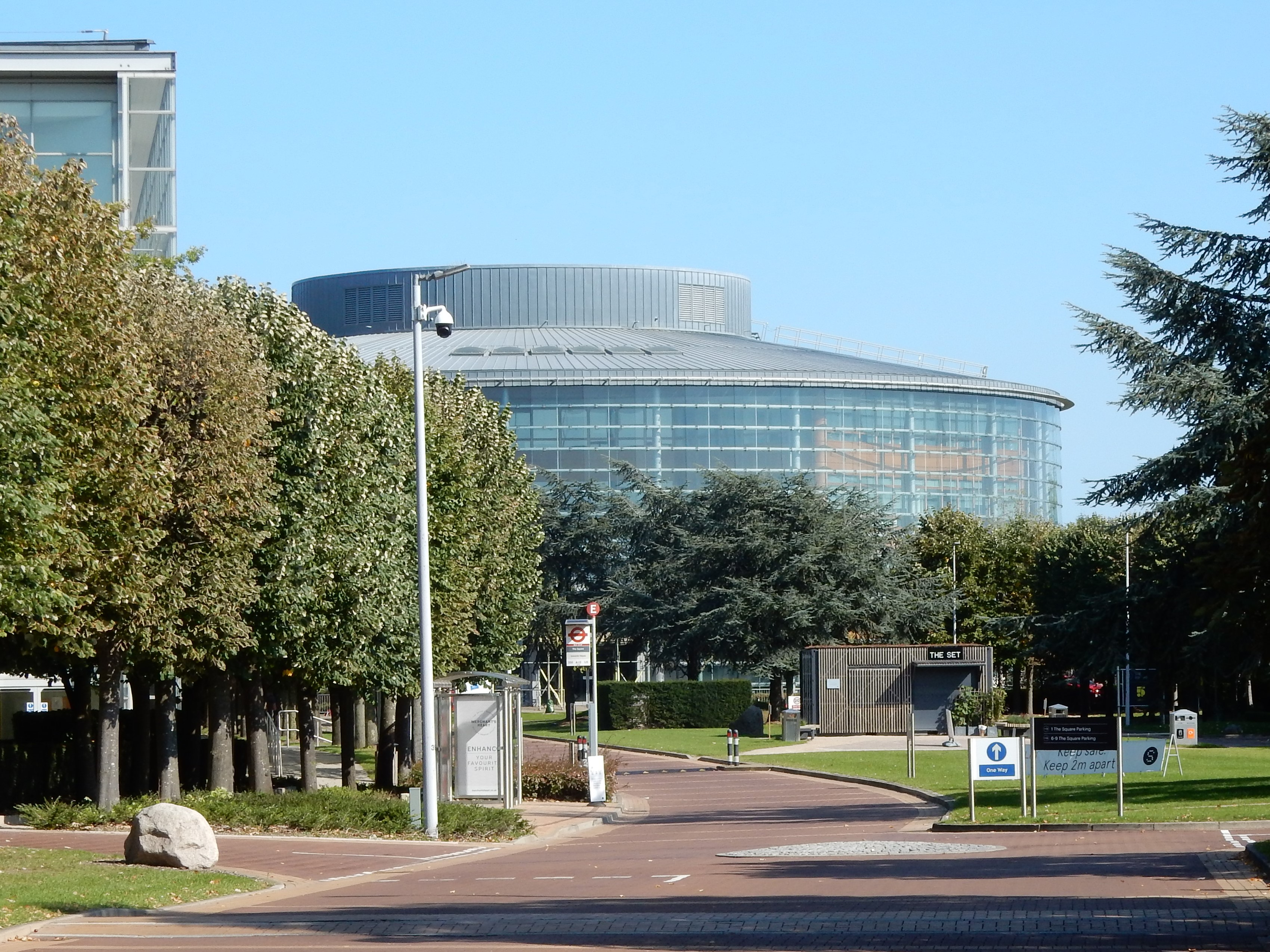
- Stockley Business Park
- London borough: Hillingdon
- Ceremonial county: Greater London
- Region: London
- Country: England
- Sovereign state: United Kingdom
- Post town: UXBRIDGE
- Postcode district: UB11
- Dialling code: 020
- Police: Metropolitan
- Fire: London
- Ambulance: London
- UK Parliament: Hayes & Harlington, Uxbridge & South Ruislip
- London Assembly: Ealing and Hillingdon

Stockley Park is a business estate and public country park located between Hayes, Yiewsley, and West Drayton in the London Borough of Hillingdon. In August 2020, it was listed in the Register of Historic Parks and Gardens of Special Historic Interest in England as Grade II.

== Residents ==
Stockley Park is home to over twenty companies and corporations including Gilead Sciences, Canon Inc., Sharp Corporation, Mitsubishi, Samsonite, Marks and Spencer and IMG Studios.

=== Video Assistant Referee (VAR) Hub ===
In 2019, IMG Studios became the location of the video assistant referee (VAR) hub for English domestic football. The hub is operated by the Professional Game Match Officials Limited (PGMOL) and is responsible for officiating decisions during matches. As a result, "Stockley Park" is sometimes used as a metonym for the VAR officials or the decisions made during football matches.

== Facilities ==
The Stockley Park Quayside area has the following amenities:

- Travelodge London Stockley Park 80-room hotel that includes a café for guests.
- Nuffield Health Fitness and Wellbeing Centre
- The Glass Pencil Art Gallery
- Food and beverage outlets Costa Coffee, Greggs, and Subway.

Stockley Country Park spans 274 acres (111 ha) of parkland and offers a network of footpaths and bridleways for public use. Within the park is the Stockley Park Golf Club which features an 18-hole championship golf course, along with a bar and restaurant.

== Transport Links ==
=== Buses ===
The park is served by three London bus routes:

- A10: Uxbridge station to Heathrow Central bus station
- 350: Millington Road, Hayes to Heathrow Terminal 5
- U5: Uxbridge station to Hayes & Harlington station

=== Rail ===
The Great Western Main Line runs to the south of Stockley Park. Hayes & Harlington railway station is located 1.2 miles (1.9 km) to the southeast. The Elizabeth line operates a stopping service between Reading and Shenfield or Abbey Wood as well as to Heathrow Terminal 4. West Drayton railway station is located 1.1 miles (1.7 km) southwest of Stockley Park. It has the same services as Hayes & Harlington station with the exception of the service to Heathrow Terminal 5.

=== Air ===
Heathrow Airport lies 3.5 miles (5.6 km) south of Stockley Park.

== History ==
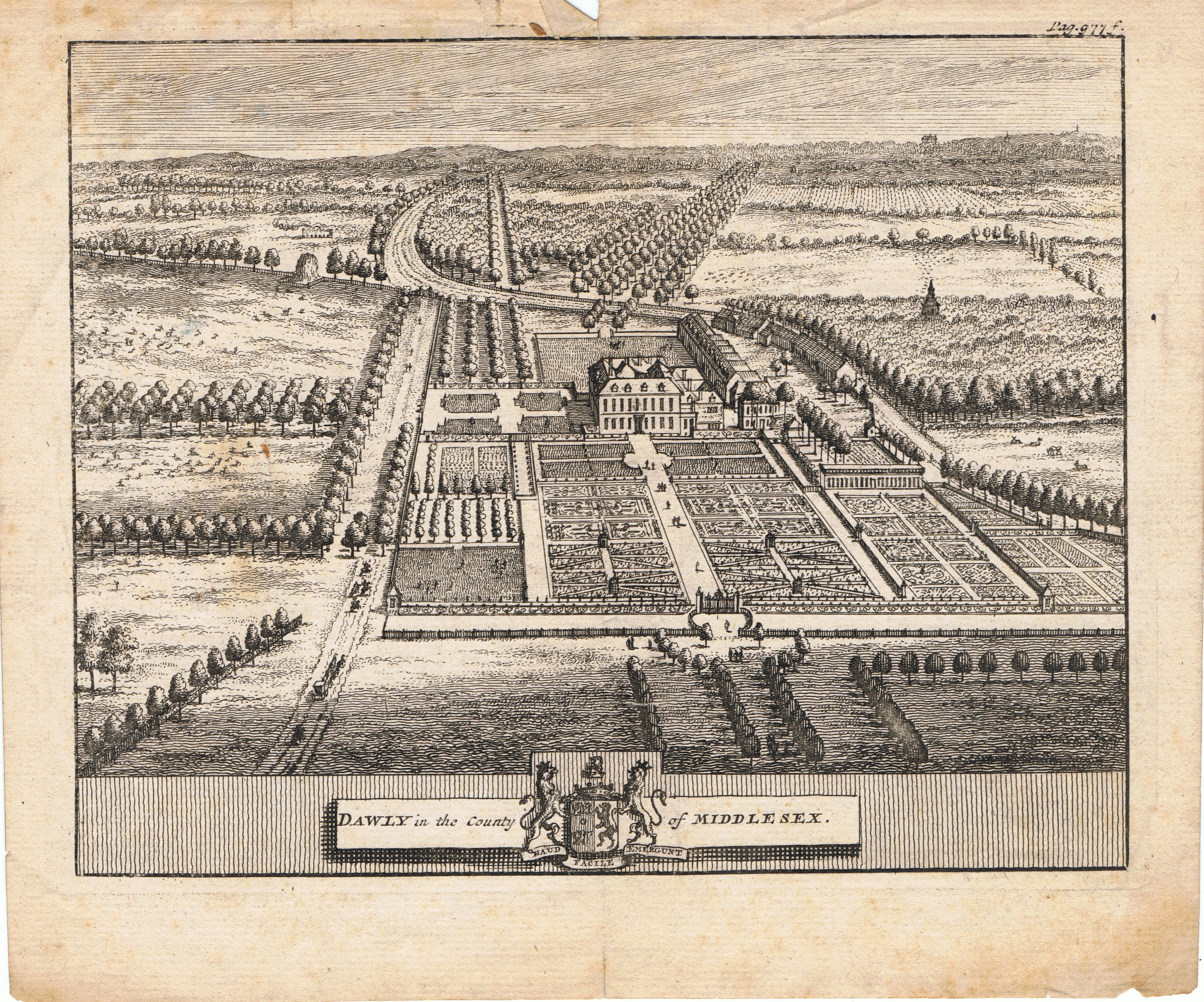
Lysons' reproduction of Kip's c.1707 original of Dawley House, which lay to the south of Stockley Park

The land which became Stockley Park lay in two ancient Middlesex parishes, Hillingdon Parish in the west and Harlington Parish in the east. In the Harlington Parish what became the eastern part of Stockley Park was within the estate of Dawley Manor and later the Dawley Wall farm. In Hillingdon Parish the land lay within Colham Manor.

After the cutting of the Grand Junction Canal (renamed Grand Union Canal in 1929) land was leased for brick-earth and later gravel and sand extraction. When deposits were exhausted some of the pits that were produced were used to deposit waste by barge from London. With the development of the Park in 1984-1985 approximately five million tonnes of waste was moved in the creation of the business park, the largest civil engineering contract involving landfill transfer in Europe.

The estate was developed by Stanhope and designed by Arup Group from 1984. A Phase II development was added between 1990 and 1998.

=== Renaming of Starveall (Starvhall/Starvehall) to Stockley ===
Stockley Park takes its name from the former hamlet of Stockley. "Stockley" is believed to be a portmanteau word derived from Cowley stock, the generic name given to the locally produced brick in West Middlesex. The hamlet of Stockley came into being with the renaming of the hamlet of Starveall (or Starvhall/Starvehall) in 1912.

Starveall was located in the ancient parish of Hillingdon, lying south of the Grand Junction Canal. The name is a common and possibly humorous description in central southern England for land of poor fertility - (Starve all).

By the middle of the 19th century, a significant brickfield has been established to the west of Starveall farm. An arm known as Starveall dock (and also as Pocock's or Broad's dock) was cut from the Grand Junction Canal to service the brickfield. In 1872 it was extended south of the farm into the Parish of West Drayton, reaching a distance of 1120 yards from the mainline of the canal. In 1879 the leaseholder of Starveall, Samuel Pocock, stated he made 15-20 million bricks per year there. In 1884 Pocock conveyed his interests to Clement Burgess Broad and George Harris, of South Wharf, Paddington.

The hamlet of Starveall continued to grow. By 1885 a church mission room with services held in affiliation with St. Matthew's Church, Yiewsley had been built. By 1888 a branch of St Matthew's Church Infant School had also been established at Starveall. On 2 February 1890 Broad Harris and Co. entertained their tenants and employees at the inaugural opening of the Starvehall Mission Hall. The mission hall would become known as St. Mary's Church.

However, by 1911 Starveall's descriptive name must have been of concern to its inhabitants as on 1 January 1912 the now Broad and Co. issued a circular stating the following:

The Directors of Broad and Co., Ltd beg to inform you that in response to the general desire of their tenantry, and others concerned at Starvhall, West Drayton, to have a 'more suitable designation of the place and works than that of "Starvhall" and "Starvhall Brickfields," they have decided, as from this date, to rename the place "Stockley" and the works to be known as "Stockley Works."

Starveall was located within the Yiewsley Urban District and Broad & Co unilateral renaming of Starveall caused some disquiet at the Council meeting on Tuesday 9 January 1912. It was pointed out that Broad & Co. had thought that they could rename Starveall without sanction and afterwards had realised their mistake and had written to the council asking them to pass a resolution confirming their action. Council member Mr J.A. Holland stated "It is entirely out of order: they ought first to have applied to this Council." However, there was general agreement with the name change. Vice-chairman of the council Mr T. Hancock stated "he saw no reason why the name should not be altered. Starveall was not a correct name, for nobody had been starved there."

Starveall was subsequently expunged, with Starveall Road, Starveall Farm, Starveall Infant School, Starveall Church Mission Hall, Starveall Football Club and Starveall Brickworks all being renamed Stockley. The only reference to Starveall today lies on the canal network managed by the Canal & River Trust. The Grand Union Canal Bridge 195 is still known as Starveall Bridge.

In January 1918 three hundred Royal Naval Air Service (RNAS) personnel were stationed at Stockley. A depot was established as the main base for the RNAS Air Construction Corps (ACC). The depot had a Repair Shop, two Stores, Packing and Receiving Rooms, Officers' Mess and Quarters, Executive Office, Sergeants' Mess and Quarters for the men. With the formation of the RAF on 1 April 1918 the depot became RAF West Drayton.

Approximately 70 men of Stockley served in the armed forces in the First World War with 11 giving their lives in the conflict. A war memorial tablet bearing their names was erected outside the mission hall which was unveiled in a ceremony on 6 January 1921.

Stockley continued to be a centre of brick production through the 1920s. However the resources of brick-earth began to become depleted. By 1930 the Stockley brickworks were producing only two million bricks a year. In 1935 the brickworks was closed down.

In 1949-50 the Stockley housing estate was constructed to the west of the hamlet by the Yiewsley and West Drayton Urban District Council. However without its brickmaking raison d'être, the hamlet itself was razed with the Stockley Close Industrial estate today lying where the hamlet was situated. To the industrial estate's east and south lies a truncated 409-yard section of the former canal arm. Some of the buildings of Stockley Farm remain and to its west lies a small local park, Stockley Recreation Ground, which serves the Stockley housing estate.

== See also ==
- Heathrow Junction railway station
