= Chiswick Business Park =

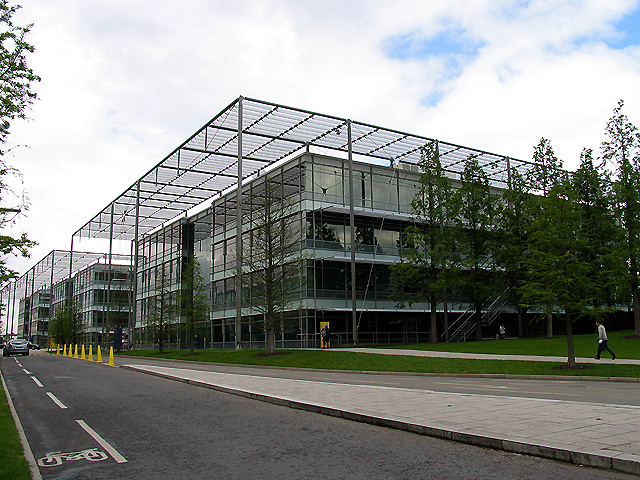
- View from Chiswick High Road in May 2005 with building 12 in the foreground
- Interactive map of the Chiswick Business Park area

General information
- Type: Business park
- Location: Chiswick High Road, Gunnersbury, England
- Coordinates: 51.495°N 0.275°W
- Current tenants: See below
- Completed: September 2015
- Owner: China Investment Corporation

Design and construction
- Architecture firm: Rogers Stirk Harbour + Partners
- Developer: Stanhope
- Structural engineer: Arup
- Main contractor: Lendlease

Website
- www.enjoy-work.com

Chiswick Business Park is a business park in Gunnersbury, West London, fronting on to Chiswick High Road.

== History ==
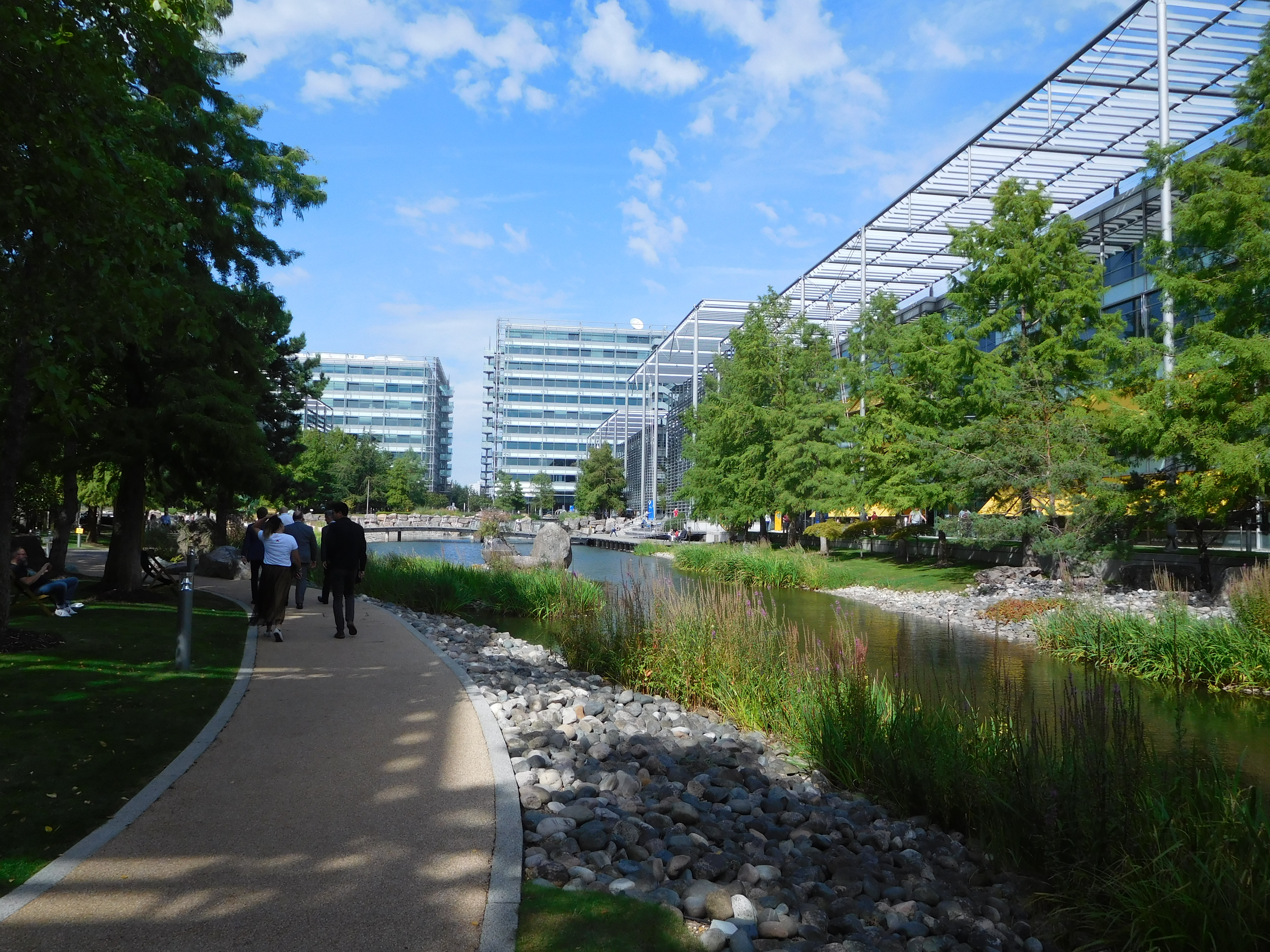
Lake and landscaping in August 2019

=== Bus maintenance site ===
The land on which the Chiswick Business Park was built had been owned by the Rothschild family and planted as orchards in the 19th century. In 1921, the London General Omnibus Company opened a 33-acre bus maintenance facility on a site bounded by Chiswick High Road to the south, the North London line to the east and the Piccadilly line to the north. At its peak it employed 3,500 men, by 1985 it was down to 700. It was closed by London Regional Transport in 1990.

=== Design and construction ===
In 1990–1991, architects Terry Farrell & Partners designed a master plan for a Stanhope and Trafalgar House consortium for the site with buildings designed by Foster Associates and Peter Foggo around the main piazza, and others by Rogers Stirk Harbour + Partners and ABK Architects around a smaller square to one side. Outline planning permission was granted in 1991 for 11 buildings to be built.

In 1996, Kværner took ownership of the site, selling it in 1999 to the Chiswick Park Unit Trust led by Schroders and Aberdeen Property Investors with Stanhope as development manager. Rogers Stirk Harbour + Partners was commissioned to prepare a new master plan. The first building was completed at the Chiswick High Road end in December 2000 with a further 11 built in stages, the last being completed in September 2015. Buildings range in height from four to twelve floors.

The Chiswick Park Unit Trust sold the park to the Blackstone Group in January 2011. Blackstone sold the property to China Investment Corporation in January 2014. Blackstone retained ownership of building 7, until selling it in February 2020 to Stanhope, while building 8 is owned by Abrdn.

=== Footbridge ===
Chiswick Park Footbridge, to the north of the Gunnersbury Triangle Nature Reserve, was opened in January 2019 to connect the business park with Chiswick Park tube station.

== Reception ==
The Buildings of England calls the architectural lineup "a galaxy of famous names", contrasting the park's coherent layout with the unplanned office blocks that had "sprouted up haphazardly" in the rest of Gunnersbury.

== Tenants ==
Tenants in 2021 include CBS, Danone, Ericsson, Foxtons, IMG, Intelsat, Otis, Paramount Pictures, PepsiCo, Seadrill, Singapore Airlines, Starbucks, Tullow Oil and United International Pictures. Richmond, The American International University in London announced they would be moving into the business park in September 2022.
