= Computer Entrepreneur Award =

The Computer Entrepreneur Award was created in 1982 by the IEEE Computer Society, for individuals with major technical or entrepreneurial contributions to the computer industry. The work must be public, and the award is not given until fifteen years after the developments. The physical award is a chalice from sterling silver and under the cup a gold-plated crown.

== Recipients ==
Following people received the Computer Entrepreneur Award:

- 2011: Diane Greene and Mendel Rosenblum, founders of VMware, for "creating a virtualization platform".
- 2009: Sandy Lerner and Len Bosack, founders of Cisco Systems, for "pioneering routing technology".
- 2008: John E. Warnock and Charles M. Geschke, founders of Adobe Systems, PostScript and PDF inventors, for the "desktop publishing revolution".
- 2008: Edwin E. Catmull, Pixar, for many important contributions in computer graphics.
- 2004: Bjarne Stroustrup, C++ inventor, for contributions to "object-oriented programming technologies".
- 2000: Michael Dell, founder of Dell Inc., for "revolutionizing the personal computer industry".
- 1999: Clive Sinclair, home computers pioneer, for "inspiring the computer industry".
- 1998: Bill Gates, Paul Allen, Steve Jobs and Steve Wozniak, founders of Microsoft and Apple Inc., for their contributions to the "personal computer industry".
- 1998: George Schussel, founder of Digital Consulting Institute (DCI), for "leadership in professional development, continuing education, and technology assessment".
- 1997: Andrew S. Grove, former CEO and chairman of Intel Corporation, for "contributions to the computing industry and profession".
- 1996: Daniel S. Bricklin, "the father of the spreadsheet", for pioneering work on the spreadsheet.
- 1995: William Hewlett and David Packard, founders of Hewlett-Packard, for their "role model for the entire computing industry".
- 1990: J. Presper Eckert, co-inventor ENIAC (together with John Mauchly), for "pioneering design work" for the first general-purpose electronic digital computer.
- 1989: Gene M. Amdahl, for "entrepreneurial efforts" in the "mainframe industry".
- 1987: Erwin Tomash, for "pioneering work" on computer peripherals.
- 1986: Gordon Moore and Robert Noyce, for "early contributions to microcomputers and silicon components".
- 1985: Kenneth Olsen and William Norris, for "pioneering work" on minicomputers.

== See also ==
- List of computer-related awards
