= VCloud Air =

Public cloud computing service

vCloud Air was a public cloud computing service built on vSphere from VMware. vCloud Air has three "infrastructure as a service" (IaaS) subscription service types: dedicated cloud, virtual private cloud, and disaster recovery. vCloud Air also offers a pay-as-you-go service named Virtual Private Cloud OnDemand.

In Q2 2017, VMware sold vCloud Air to French cloud service provider OVH.

== History ==
VMware announced the vCloud initiative at the 2008 VMworld conference in Las Vegas and garnered significant press attention.

At the 2009 VMworld conference in San Francisco vCloud was featured in the vCloud Pavilion. vCloud was also a subject at the 2010 VMworld conference.

On May 21, 2013, the early access program for vCloud Hybrid Service was launched. On August 26, 2013, general availability was announced for vCloud Hybrid Service including features such as DRaaS and Direct Connect.

vCloud Hybrid Service was rebranded to vCloud Air on August 21, 2014. vCloud Air provides a hybrid cloud—a public IaaS that functions as an extension of existing data centers running VMware vSphere, with common management and networking. With the rebrand of the service, they also announced a cloud computing On-Demand program that allows users to pay only for what each user needs to use for resources.

vCloud Air Mobile was announced on August 25, 2014, which added the integration of AirWatch and Pivotal Cloud Foundry.

On 4 April 2017 French cloud provider OVH announced its intent to acquire VMware vCloud Air Business and all personnel. The acquisition was completed in Q2 2017.

== Data center locations ==
Similar to other public cloud providers, vCloud Air supports the concept of regions - or locations, in vCloud terminology - which are typically used for better pricing, to increase application performance, or as disaster recovery. vCloud Air is offered to the public in California, Nevada, Texas, Virginia and New Jersey in the United States. Internationally, it is available in the United Kingdom, Germany, Japan, and Australia.

Government users have access to two additional locations: one in Arizona, and another in Virginia.

== Architecture ==
vCloud Air supports more than 5,000 applications and 90+ operating systems certified to run on vSphere. The use of vCloud Air allows seamless workload portability and migration due to vSphere, which means no rewrites or recoding when moving workloads from an on-premises data center to the cloud and vice versa.

Network virtualization allows users to configure firewalls and network to mirror on-site networks, including NAT rules and firewall rules, networks, and public IPs.

== Virtual Private Cloud OnDemand ==
Virtual Private Cloud OnDemand is self-service on-demand cloud computing platform from vCloud Air. This infrastructure-as-a-service (IaaS) pay-as-you-go offering allows users to consume specific vCPU, storage, vRAM, Network, and IP as needed. Additionally, the service allows adjusting of powered-on state virtual machines.

VMware announced plans for a vCloud Air Virtual Private Cloud OnDemand early access program on October 14, 2014. The program was officially launched on November 17, 2014. It included $1,000 in-service credits for approved users.

Virtual Private Cloud OnDemand was officially released publicly on January 20, 2015, An initial offering of $300 in-service credits to be used in the first 90 days after signing up was also announced.

== Configurations ==
The most basic configuration includes a virtual machine with 1GB RAM, 1 vCPU, and 20GB SSD storage at $0.07 / hour. Currently the service offers the choices of these three operating systems:

- CentOS
- Microsoft Windows Server Standard Edition
- Ubuntu

Additionally, users can consume up to 16 vCPUs and 120 GB of memory. Storage options include:

- 2 TB standard storage
- 2 TB of SSD-accelerated storage

Users can also have up to 20 public IP addresses and support levels vary, with online support being 7% of the total invoice and production support being $100 or 12%, whichever is greater.
