= John Marshall (entrepreneur) =

American entrepreneur and inventor

- Born: Wisconsin, USA
- Education: Georgia Institute of Technology
- Occupation: Co-chairman OneTrust
- Known for: Founder, President and CEO of AirWatch
- Awards: 2013 Ernst & Young Entrepreneur of the Year
- Website: https://onetrust.com/

John D. Marshall is an American entrepreneur and inventor. He is the co-founder and former president and CEO of AirWatch, which VMware acquired for $1.54 billion in 2014. He served as co-chairman at a software start-up called OneTrust till March 2023.

== Career ==
In 1996, Marshall was hired as an implementation consultant at Manhattan Associates, a supplier of field inventory management software. He spent 18 months helping to launch the company's presence in Europe and assisted in the design of multiple software modules relating to transportation, load planning and global logistics.

Celarix later hired Marshall as vice president for marketing strategy in 1999. He was responsible for designing the company's product solutions and developing the go-to-market strategy. GXS Worldwide, Inc., formerly GE Information Systems, acquired Celarix in 2003.

Marshall founded Wandering WiFi in 2003. The company started by setting up hospitality businesses with internet hot spots and Marshall grew the customer base and extended the software to monitor and manage other types of network infrastructure.

In 2006, Alan Dabbiere, founder and former president of Manhattan Associates, joined the business and together they launched AirWatch to accelerate development on managing Windows Mobile devices. After the launch of the iPhone, they pivoted the company to develop software to manage smartphones.

During a press conference with Georgia Governor Nathan Deal on Jan. 25, 2013, Marshall and Dabbiere announced that AirWatch would create 800 additional jobs in Georgia over two years and invest more than $4 million in new equipment. In three years, the company grew from 100 employees to more than 1,500.

In February 2013, AirWatch secured a $200 million Series A funding round, the largest Series A round of any software company in history, from Insight Venture Partners and Accel Partners. AirWatch also stated the company's revenues had grown 40 percent quarter over quarter for the previous eight quarters.

In July 2013, AirWatch acquired Motorola Solutions' MSP (Mobility Services Platform) to extend management capabilities to ruggedized devices.

In January 2014, VMware acquired AirWatch for $1.54 billion, the largest acquisition to-date for VMware. During the Q4 2014 earnings call, VMware announced that AirWatch reached $200 million in 2014 bookings, 2,000 employees and more than 15,000 customers as of January 2015, making it the largest enterprise mobility management provider in terms of revenue, customers and employees. Some of the companies using AirWatch include Wal-Mart Stores Inc., The Home Depot Inc., Walgreens, Delta Air Lines, and the Department of Justice. As of February 2015, the AirWatch app was ranked as the second top free business application.

As of March 2016 he stepped down as CEO and took up a position as an Advisory Board Member, a position which he held until December 2016. After stepping down from his role at VMWare AirWatch, John became co-chairman alongside long-time colleague and former chairman at AirWatch Alan Dabbiere at OneTrust, a privacy management software platform.

Marshall is a board member on the Georgia Tech Information Security Center (GTISC) Industry Advisory Board.
