= Pivotal Labs =

Software development consulting firm

- Type: Division of Pivotal Software
- Industry: Software development
- Founded: 1989
- Headquarters: San Francisco, California
- Products: Pivotal Tracker
- Website: pivotal.io/labs

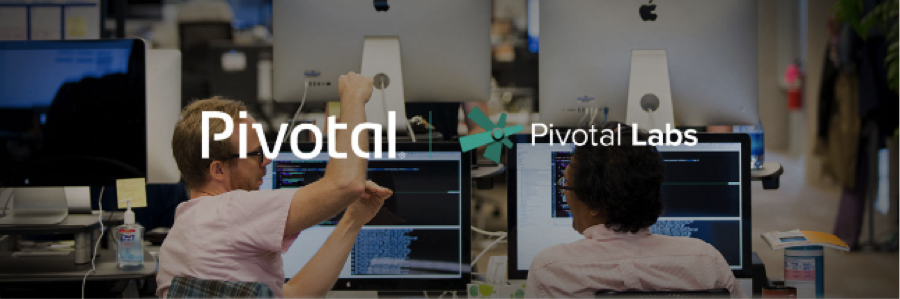
Engineers pairing at Pivotal Labs

Pivotal Labs (later VMware Tanzu Labs) was an agile software development consulting firm headquartered in San Francisco, California. The company developed Pivotal Tracker workflow software. It was a division of Pivotal Software.

== History ==
The company was founded in 1989 by Rob Mee and Sherry Erskine. In 2008 Pivotal Labs released Pivotal Tracker, which was used as their internal project management and collaboration software. EMC acquired Pivotal Labs, and in March 2013, Pivotal Software was formed after spinning out of EMC and VMware.

In October 2013, Pivotal acquired Toronto-based Xtreme Labs, a mobile app development company. Xtreme Labs' clients included Microsoft and Groupon.

In December 2019, Pivotal Labs was acquired by VMware and renamed VMware Tanzu Labs.

In November 2023, VMware was acquired by Broadcom and Tanzu Labs was subsequently shut down in January 2025, with Pivotal Tracker retired in April 2025.

In 2022, Rob Mee founded Mechanical Orchard, a company focused on modernizing legacy systems through incremental rewrites and AI-assisted development. Several early team members were also former Pivotal engineers, and the company draws heavily on Pivotal’s engineering practices, including test-driven development, pair programming, and iterative delivery. While Pivotal Labs primarily helped startups and enterprises build new software products, Mechanical Orchard applies similar principles to the challenge of transforming complex, business-critical systems. The startup has secured significant funding to support its mission, including a $24 million Series A round led by Emergence Capital in early 2024, and a $50 million Series B round led by GV (Google Ventures) in August 2024.

== Products and services ==
The company used pair programming while doing its software development and also consulted with other companies to help them use the method. The company provided consulting programming for several large technology organizations worldwide.

== See also ==
- Agile Lab
