= Grameen Foundation =

Non-profit organization

- Founded: 1997; 29 years ago
- Founder: Alex Counts
- Type: 501(c)(3)
- Purpose: Poverty
- Location(s): Washington, D.C., USA; 38.9039°N 77.0345°W
- Region served: Asia, Africa, the Americas
- Method: Social Enterprise, Microfinance, Technology
- Key people: Zubaida Bai – President & CEO; Peter Cowhey – Chair; Muhammad Yunus – Founding Board Member
- Website: www.grameenfoundation.org

Grameen Foundation, founded as Grameen Foundation USA, also known as "GFUSA", is a global 501(c)(3) non-profit organization based in Washington, DC, that uses digital technology and data to understand very poor people, in detail, and offer them—and the entire ecosystem of agencies and actors surrounding them—empowering tools that meet and elevate their everyday realities. Its CEO is Zubaida Bai. Grameen Foundation's mission is, "To enable the poor, especially women, to create a world without poverty and hunger." According to the OECD, Grameen Foundation’s financing for 2019 development increased by 33% to US$45.5 million.

It is separate from organizations called "Grameen Foundation" in different countries, such as Grameen Foundation Australia.

== History ==
The Grameen Foundation was founded by author and independent consultant to nonprofit organizations Alex Counts in 1997. He established the foundation with $6,000 in seed funding from Muhammad Yunus. The mission was to facilitate the expansion of banks modeled after the Grameen Bank beyond the borders of Bangladesh and increase the access of poor people to microfinance by millions worldwide. After 18 years, he resigned from his position as president and CEO in 2015. He was replaced by former executive vice president for global programs David Edelstein. Grameen (গ্রামীণ) is a Bengali word meaning "rural" or "village."

Nobel prize winner Professor Muhammad Yunus is founder and managing director of Grameen Bank, sat on the Board of Directors for 12 years and is now a director emeritus. Immediate past chairs of the board are Paul Maritz, formerly CEO of VMWare and formerly a senior executive at Microsoft, and Robert Eichfeld, a retired executive at Citibank. The current chair of the board is Peter Cowhey, the UC San Diego Interim Executive Vice Chancellor for Academic Affairs, Qualcomm Endowed Chair in Communications and Technology Policy, and the dean of the School of Global Policy and Strategy.

== Programs ==
The Grameen Foundation has been noted for its use of technology and data to understand the poor, especially women and girls. IT offers them tools that allow them to show up with their full power to end poverty and hunger.

Working with local and global allies, Grameen Foundation also develops and distributes mobile phone-based applications to help the poor to better manage:

- Their health, through such programs as the Mobile Technology for Community Health (MOTECH) initiative in Ghana
- Their crops, through such programs as the Community Knowledge Worker initiative in Uganda
- Their finances, though such programs as the Mobile Money initiative in Uganda

Grameen Foundation forayed into open source core banking systems by launching the website mifosx. The Mifos project was formally launched by Grameen Foundation in 2006.
