= Apture =

Web service

Apture was a service that allowed publishers and bloggers to link and incorporate multimedia into a dynamic layer above their pages.

Apture was used by several large organizations and publishers including The Washington Post, The Economist, Scribd, and the World Wide Fund for Nature as well as individual bloggers.

Apture announced its first round of funding in March, 2009. It received $4.1 million in a round led by Clearstone Venture Partners as well as angel investors Paul Maritz (CEO of VMware) and Steve Taylor (former executive VP of the Boston Globe).

In August 2010, Apture announced their browser extension, Apture Highlights, which enabled users to instantaneously search for content from around the web without leaving the page. The Firefox version of Apture Highlights was downloaded about 500,000 times.

On November 12, 2011, Apture announced that it had been acquired by Google.

On December 20, 2011, Apture disabled its scripts and discontinued its products and services.
