= Lynnfield, Massachusetts =

- Town
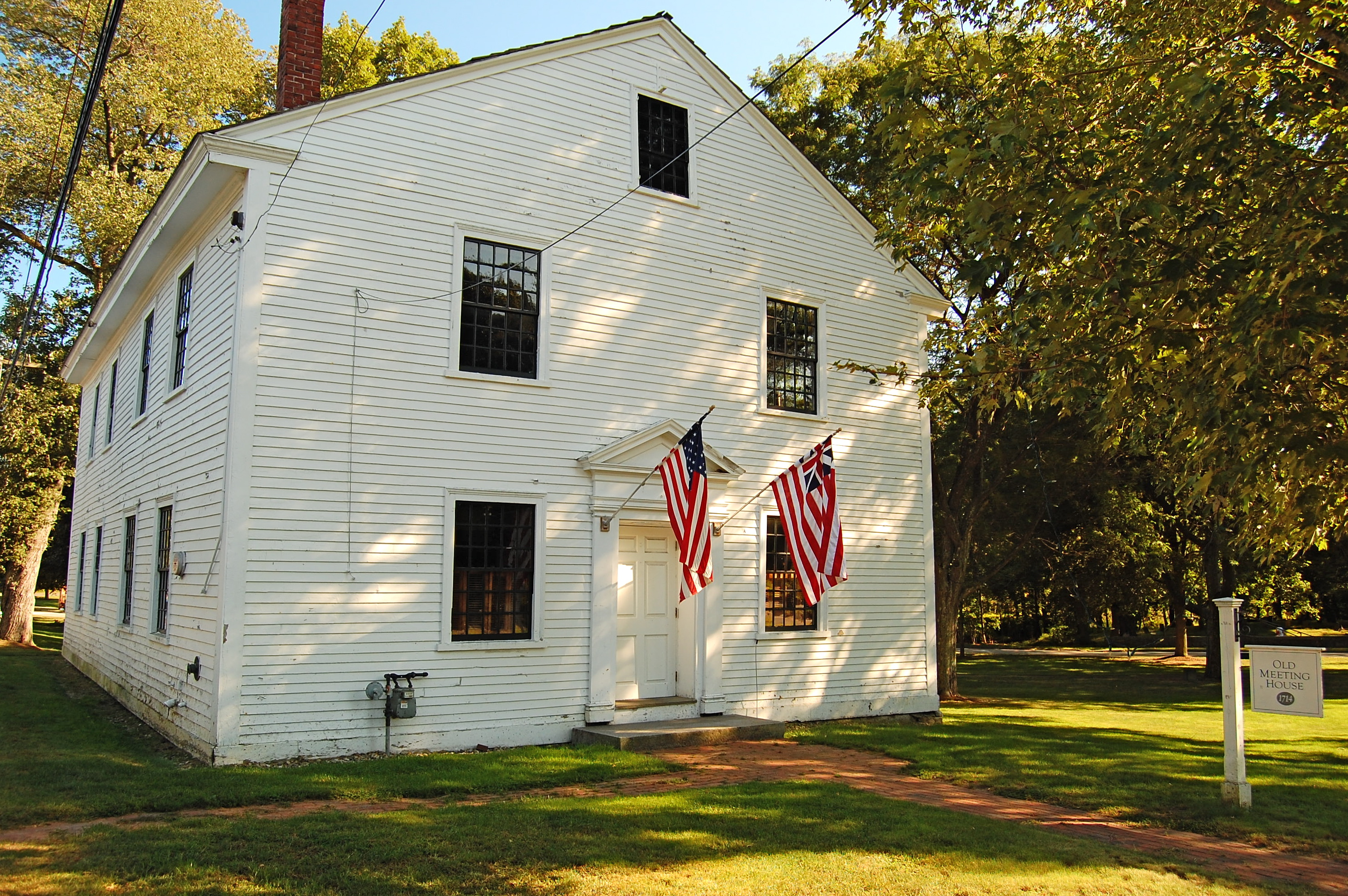
- Lynnfield Old Meeting House

- Seal

- Location in Essex County and the state of Massachusetts.
- Coordinates: 42°32′20″N 71°02′55″W
- Country: United States
- State: Massachusetts
- County: Essex
- Settled: 1638
- Incorporated: 1814

Government
  - Type: Open town meeting

Area
  - Total: 10.5 sq mi (27.1 km^{2})
  - Land: 9.9 sq mi (25.6 km^{2})
  - Water: 0.58 sq mi (1.5 km^{2})
- Elevation: 98 ft (30 m)

Population (2020)
  - Total: 13,000
  - Density: 1,300/sq mi (510/km^{2})
- Time zone: UTC-5 (Eastern)
  - Summer (DST): UTC-4 (Eastern)
- ZIP code: 01940
- Area code: 339 / 781
- FIPS code: 25-37560
- GNIS feature ID: 0618299
- Website: www.lynnfieldma.gov

Lynnfield is a town in Essex County, Massachusetts, United States. At the 2020 census, the town population was 13,000.

Lynnfield initially consisted of two distinct villages with a single governing body. Lynnfield Center had a mostly agricultural population, while South Lynnfield had a mixed culture. Together, the two towns evolved into one of the most prosperous suburbs in the North Shore region of Massachusetts.

== History ==
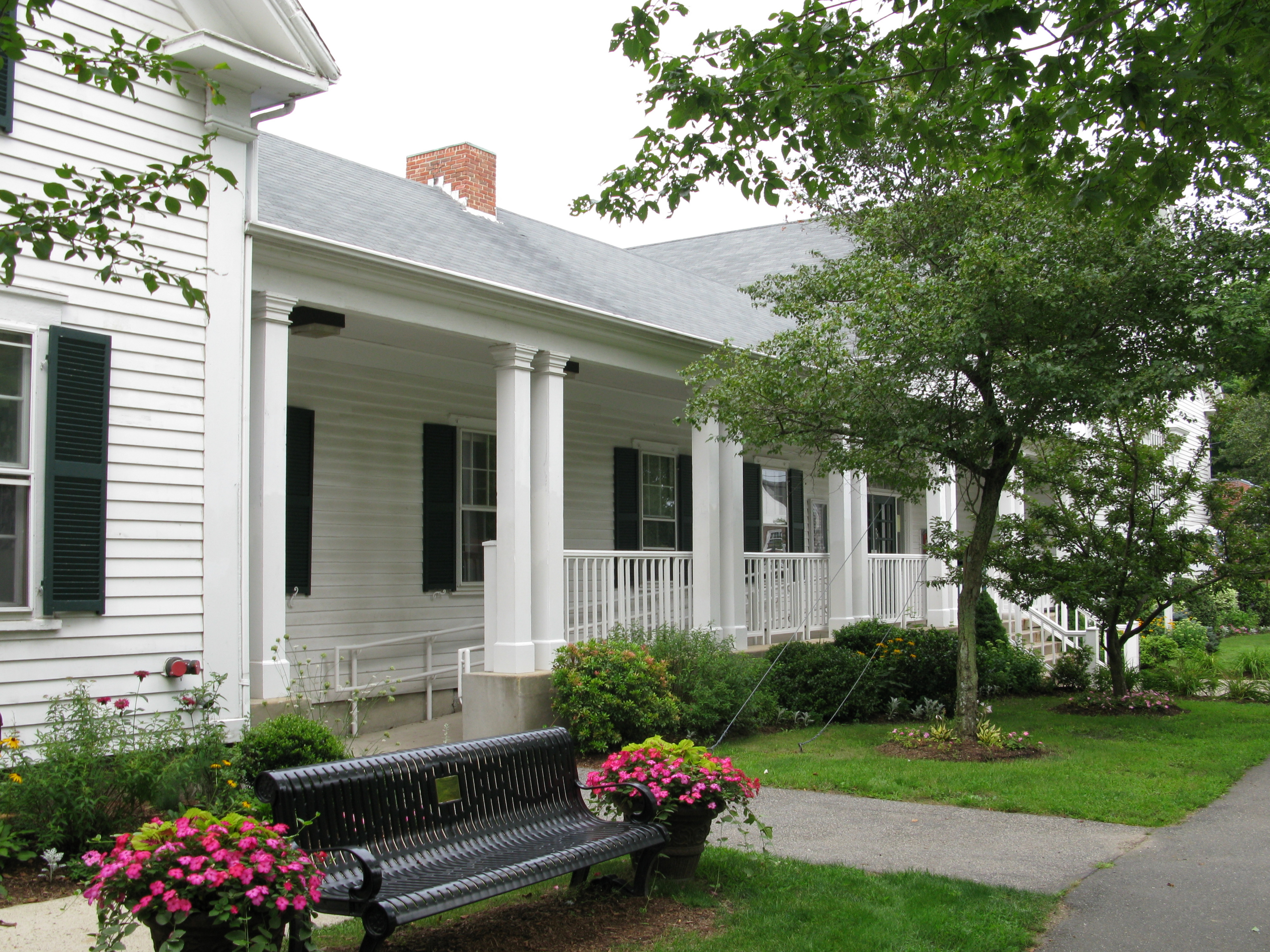
Lynnfield Public Library

The town of Lynnfield was first settled in 1638 and was made a district separate from Lynn in 1782. It was later officially incorporated in 1814. Historically, Lynnfield functioned as two separate villages connected by one governing body: in Lynnfield Center resided a mostly agricultural population, while South Lynnfield was a crossroad situated amongst neighboring larger towns. During this time, the town had two inns, a granite rock quarry, a small, carbonated beverage bottler, and various eating institutions.

The stagecoach line north from Boston to Portsmouth, New Hampshire, known locally as the "Newburyport Turnpike", ran through South Lynnfield. Later this roadway became U.S. Route 1, the route which brought many people north to the small town during the post-World War II population surge. Lynnfield had attractions such as horse shows and ballroom dancing. Lynnfield has since become a modern, chiefly residential suburb of Boston.

Along with the communities of Chelsea, Lynn, Salem, Marblehead, Danvers, Middleton, Andover, Methuen, Haverhill, Amesbury and Salisbury, Lynnfield was a part of "The Gerry-mander" so described by the Boston Gazette on March 26, 1812.

Lynnfield Center retained limited commuter rail service, via the Boston & Maine Railroad, into the late 1950s/early 1960s with a small railroad boarding platform located not far from the current Town Hall offices.

When, in the 1960s, the United States Post Office implemented the Zone Improvement Program with five-digit numerical codes, Lynnfield was assigned two ZIP codes, 01940 and 01944, for the Lynnfield Center and the South Lynnfield post offices, respectively. Later, 01944 was reassigned to Manchester (now Manchester-by-the-Sea); South Lynnfield currently shares Zip Code 01940 with Lynnfield Center.

== Geography and transportation ==
Lynnfield is located at 42°31′40″N 71°1′42″W (42.527895, −71.028348). According to the United States Census Bureau, the town has a total area of 10.5 square miles (27.1 km^{2}), of which 9.9 square miles (25.6 km^{2}) is land and 0.58 square miles (1.5 km^{2}), or 5.58%, is water. The Ipswich River forms the northern border of the town, and several brooks cross through town. Several lakes and ponds dot the town, including Suntaug Lake, Reedy Meadow, Pillings Pond, and Walden Pond (a less famous cousin of the one in Concord). A portion of the Lynn Woods Reservation is located in the southeastern corner of town, and in the northwestern part of town lies part of Camp Curtis Guild, a Massachusetts National Guard base which also contains lands in the neighboring towns. The highest part of town lies on Middleton Hill in the northern part of town.

Lynnfield lies along the western border of Essex County, and is bordered by the Middlesex County towns of Wakefield to the southwest, Reading to the west, and North Reading to the north and northwest. Within Essex County, the town is bordered by Middleton to the north, Peabody to the northeast, Lynn to the southeast, and Saugus to the south. The town common lies 9 miles (14 km) west of Salem, 14 miles (23 km) north of Boston, and 15 miles (24 km) south of Lawrence.

Interstate 95 and Massachusetts State Route 128 pass concurrently through town twice, becoming separate just over the Peabody line. U.S. Highway Route 1 and Massachusetts State Route 129 also enter the town concurrently, separating in the southeast corner of town at the Lynnfield Tunnel, a local traffic landmark. No other state routes pass through the town. The Springfield Terminal Railroad passes through town, but is no longer in service. There is no MBTA Commuter Rail service within Lynnfield; the nearest train station is off to the west in the neighboring town of Wakefield, which serves the Haverhill Commuter Rail Line. MBTA Bus Route 436 clips the extreme southeastern corner of Lynnfield with a bus stop available at the intersection of Lynnfield Street and Lookout Terrace; the stop is located just two blocks southeast of Condon Circle (sometimes referred to as Goodwin Circle). Inbound service on MBTA Bus Route 436 travels to Central Square, Lynn to connect with the Newburyport/Rockport Commuter Rail Line; outbound buses provide service to the Northshore Mall in Peabody and the Liberty Tree Mall in Danvers. The nearest general aviation airport is Beverly Municipal Airport to the east; the nearest commercial airport for domestic and international service can be found at Boston's Logan International Airport.

== Demographics ==
Historical population
Year	Pop.	±%
1790	491	—
1800	468	−4.7%
1810	509	+8.8%
1820	596	+17.1%
1830	617	+3.5%
1840	707	+14.6%
1850	794	+12.3%
1860	866	+9.1%
1870	818	−5.5%
1880	686	−16.1%
1890	787	+14.7%
1900	888	+12.8%
1910	911	+2.6%
1920	1,165	+27.9%
1930	1,594	+36.8%
1940	2,287	+43.5%
1950	3,927	+71.7%
1960	8,398	+113.9%
1970	10,826	+28.9%
1980	11,267	+4.1%
1990	11,274	+0.1%
2000	11,542	+2.4%
2010	11,596	+0.5%
2020	13,000	+12.1%
2022*	12,951	−0.4%
* = population estimate. Source: United States census records and Population Estimates Program data.

As of the census of 2010, there were 11,596 people, 4,179 households, and 3,267 families residing in the town. The population density was 1,143 inhabitants per square mile (441/km^{2}). There were 4,354 housing units at an average density of 429.2 per square mile (165.7/km^{2}). The racial makeup of the town was 94.7% White, 0.5% Black or African American, 3.3% Asian, 0% Pacific Islander, 0.4% from other races, and 1% from two or more races. Hispanic or Latino of any race were 1.7% of the population.

There were 4,179 households, out of which 35.2% had children under the age of 18 living with them, 68.5% were married couples living together, 7.1% had a female householder with no husband present, 2.5% a male householder with no wife present, and 21.8% were non-families. 18.8% of all households were made up of individuals, and 11.6% had someone living alone who was 65 years of age or older. The average household size was 2.77 and the average family size was 3.20.

In the town, the population was spread out, with 25.3% under the age of 18, 5.7% from 18 to 24, 19.6% from 25 to 44, 31.7% from 45 to 64, and 17.7% who were 65 years of age or older. The median age was 43 years. For every 100 females, there were 96.2 males. For every 100 females age 18 and over, there were 92.2 males.

The median income for a household in the town was $136,101, and the median income for a family was $95,804, which are both well over the national averages. Males had a median income of $82,386 versus $50,589 for females. The per capita income for the town was $50,916. The average household net worth is $966,273.

== Government ==
The town is more conservative than much of the rest of Massachusetts. In the 2008 Presidential election, John McCain received 55% of the town's vote, up slightly from the George W. Bush's 53% in 2004. In the 2012 Presidential election, former Governor Mitt Romney received 60.9% of the town's vote. However, in a reflection of Donald Trump's weakness in wealthy white suburban areas, the Republican presidential vote share in the town dropped to 51.5% in 2016. The Republican vote share under Donald Trump dipped further in 2020 and allowed Joe Biden to win the town with 50.5% of the vote, becoming the first Democratic presidential nominee to win the town since 1996. In the 2024 Presidential election, Donald Trump received 50.9% of the town's vote.

=== Local government ===
Lynnfield uses the open town meeting model common in New England with a Board of Selectmen overseeing the operation of the town.

=== State and federal representation ===
Lynnfield is part of Massachusetts's 6th congressional district, represented by Seth Moulton, effective January 2015. In the Massachusetts Senate, Lynnfield lies within the Third Essex district and is currently represented by Democrat Brendan Crighton. In the Massachusetts House of Representatives, the town is located within the 20th Middlesex district, represented by Republican Bradley Jones, Jr.

== Education ==
Lynnfield Public Schools operates area public schools. Lynnfield High School is the district's public high school. The area is also served by Lynnfield Middle School, Huckleberry Hill Elementary School and Summer Street Elementary School. Our Lady of the Assumption is a private Catholic school located in the town.

The public school system consistently has one of the highest standardized test scores in the state. In 2020, Lynnfield High School was ranked 11th overall and seventh in math and reading proficiency in Massachusetts by U.S. News & World Report. Lynnfield High receives an overall A grade on Niche.com

== Economy ==
The dairy company HP Hood is based in Lynnfield.

Market Street is based in Lynnfield and opened in 2013. The outdoor shopping plaza has over 80 stores, including restaurants and shops. An ice rink is operated during the winter.

== Notable people ==
- Eddie Andelman, former sports talk show host, TV personality and founder of the Hot Dog Safari
- Garnet "Ace" Bailey, former Boston Bruins player, killed on 9/11
- E. Florence Barker (1840–1897), first president of the National Woman's Relief Corps
- Johnny Bucyk, former Boston Bruin
- Anson Carter, former Bruins player who lived in town while with the team
- Jon Casey, former Boston Bruins goaltender
- Theodore Conrad, bank robber and fugitive who became a car dealer under the name Thomas Randele; his identity remained a secret for 52 years
- John Connolly, former FBI agent, depicted in the movie The Departed
- Billy Costa, host of Boston radio station Kiss 108's morning show Matty in the Morning, also host of New England Cable News TV Diner and of the annual Federal Reserve Cup of Boston
- Brandon Greenstein, electronic dance music producer known as The BreakBomb Project
- Byron Dafoe, former Bruins goaltender
- Phil Esposito, Bruins center 1967–1976
- Dwight Evans, Boston Red Sox outfielder 1972–1990
- Hank Finkel, former Boston Celtics center
- Brian Flynn, Montreal Canadiens forward
- Chris Ford, former Celtics coach and player
- Kevin Gamble, former Boston Celtic and director of player development at Providence College
- Ted Green, Boston Bruins defenseman
- Ken Harrelson, former Boston Red Sox outfielder and sportscaster
- Sib Hashian, drummer, formerly of the band Boston
- David Hewes, (born in Lynnfield, Essex County, Massachusetts May 16, 1822, born into one of the "old families" of the state that trace back seven generations to the patriot Joshua Hewes.- provided the golden spike marking completion of the rail and he also planned connecting the railroad company's wires to Western Union so the taps of the silver hammer driving the golden spike in Promontory Point, Utah could be heard in San Francisco.
- Ken Hodge, Bruins' right winger 1967–1976
- Doug Houda, current New York Islanders assistant coach; longtime NHL player
- Dwayne Johnson, former WWE wrestler and actor.
- Alexei Kasatonov, former Bruins defenseman
- Steve Kasper, former Bruins player and coach
- Dennis Kenney, stage performer, and singer
- Nancy Kerrigan, Olympic figure skater
- Reggie Lemelin, former Bruins goaltender
- Pedro Martínez, former Red Sox player who lived in town during playing career
- John "Pie" McKenzie, former Boston Bruins player
- Mike Milbury, former Bruins player and coach, former GM of NY Islanders, current commentator for NHL on NBC
- Andy Moog, Boston Bruins goalie
- Philip Nel, scholar and author
- Brad Park, former New York Rangers and Bruins defenseman
- Rico Petrocelli, former Red Sox player
- Dana Quigley, professional golfer, born in Lynnfield Center
- Jean Ratelle, former New York Rangers and Boston Bruins center and NHL scout
- Dave Reid, former Bruins forward
- George Schussel, founder and former chairman of Digital Consulting Institute, founder of Jellicle Investments, Inc.
- Don Sweeney, former Boston Bruins defenseman and current general manager of the Boston Bruins
- Tim Thomas, former Bruins goaltender, once winner of the Vezina Trophy
- Richard R. Tisei, former State Senate minority leader and 2012 congressional candidate
- Bob Tufts (1955–2019), San Francisco Giants and Kansas City Royals pitcher
- Rogie Vachon, former Bruins goaltender
- Thomas Wellman, early Puritan settler during the great migration
- Carl Yastrzemski, Red Sox outfielder; Major League Baseball's Triple Crown winner in 1967
- Glen Featherstone, Former NHL Defenseman
