= Hybrid SaaS =

If a software product is offered as Hybrid SaaS or Hybrid Cloud, it means that it combines elements of both Software-as-a-Service (SaaS) and on-premises software deployment models.

In the case of a hybrid model, the software product offers a combination of cloud-based SaaS functionality and on-premises capabilities. It allows organizations to deploy the software partly in the cloud, and partly on their local infrastructure or inside their Virtual Private Cloud depending on their specific requirements and preferences.

== Benefits ==
The hybrid approach can be beneficial in certain scenarios. For example:

- Customization and control: Some organizations may have unique requirements or security concerns that require them to have greater control over their data and infrastructure. By offering a hybrid model, the software vendor allows organizations to maintain certain aspects of the software on-premises while still leveraging the benefits of the cloud-based SaaS functionality.
- Connectivity and latency: In certain industries or regions with limited internet connectivity or high latency, running critical parts of the software on-premises can ensure reliable access and faster response times.
- Compliance and data sovereignty: In industries with strict regulatory requirements or data sovereignty concerns, a hybrid approach can enable organizations to keep sensitive data on-premises while utilizing the cloud for non-sensitive operations.

By offering a Hybrid SaaS model, software vendors aim to provide flexibility and cater to a wider range of customer needs, allowing them to balance cloud-based convenience and on-premises control.

== Hybrid SaaS vs. Hybrid Cloud ==
Hybrid SaaS (Software-as-a-Service) and hybrid cloud are related but distinct concepts in the realm of cloud computing.

- Hybrid SaaS refers to a deployment model where a software application is delivered as a service and combines elements of both on-premises and cloud-based infrastructure. In this model, some components or data reside on the customer's local infrastructure (on-premises) while others are hosted in the cloud. It offers a blend of the flexibility and scalability of the cloud with the control and customization options of on-premises deployment.
- Hybrid cloud refers to a computing environment that combines both private cloud infrastructure and public cloud services. It involves the integration and orchestration of resources from multiple cloud environments, including a private cloud (on-premises infrastructure) and at least one public cloud provider, such as Amazon Web Services (AWS), Microsoft Azure, or Google Cloud Platform.

In summary, the main difference between hybrid SaaS and hybrid cloud lies in their focus. Hybrid SaaS primarily refers to a software deployment model combining on-premises and cloud-based components, while hybrid cloud refers to the integration and utilization of both private and public cloud environments, encompassing infrastructure and services beyond just software applications.

== See also ==
- Adobe Experience Cloud
