= The BreakBomb Project =

American electronic dance music project

- Origin: Lynnfield, Massachusetts, U.S.
- Genres: Electronic dance music; future bass; house
- Years active: 2018–present
- Label: Overdrive
- Website: www.breakbomb.com

The BreakBomb Project (also known as BreakBomb or TBBP) is an American electronic dance music project founded by producer Brandon Greenstein in July 2018. Based in the Boston area, the project is known for narrative-driven concept albums combining electronic and alternative styles. In 2026, the project won the Electronic Dance Music Award for Music Video of the Year for "Too Late" featuring Ryan Violet.

== Early life ==
Greenstein, a native of Lynnfield, Massachusetts, began producing music as The BreakBomb Project at age 15. His father, Randy Greenstein, is a principal of Big Night Entertainment Group, a Boston hospitality company. Greenstein has cited his father's background as a DJ as an early influence. He graduated from the Pingree School in 2021 and studied media arts production at Emerson College.

== Career ==
=== 2018–2021: Early singles ===
In 2020, the project's single "Deep End" became a viral hit on TikTok and other social media platforms. Greenstein followed with "WHY", a collaboration with singer-songwriter Ava Petrillo that received radio play and Spotify editorial playlist placement. In May 2021, he released "Drugs Don't Work" featuring Massachusetts vocalist Ryan Violet through the New York-based label Overdrive. By June 2021, the project's releases had collectively surpassed one million streams on Spotify.

=== 2023: Pretaped ===
In May 2023, The BreakBomb Project released its second studio album, Pretaped, which Greenstein produced, wrote, and conceptualized as the first installment in a series of narrative-driven albums. The album featured vocalists including Maxine and drew coverage noting a Boston Music Awards nomination for the project. That same month, the project performed in support of Hardwell.

=== 2024–present: "Too Late" and EDMA recognition ===
The project's single "Too Late", featuring Ryan Violet, was nominated for Music Video of the Year at the 2026 Electronic Dance Music Awards, alongside videos by Martin Garrix, Dom Dolla, PinkPantheress, Zara Larsson, Madeon, and Alison Wonderland. The video won the category at the ceremony held during Miami Music Week in March 2026.

== Musical style ==
The BreakBomb Project's music has been described as experimental electronic dance music emphasizing storytelling. Greenstein has described a cinematic approach to songwriting, saying he approaches music like making a soundtrack to a film.

== Discography ==
Studio albums

- Pretaped (2023)

Selected singles

- "Deep End" (2020)
- "WHY" (featuring Ava Petrillo) (2020)
- "Unsaid, Unspoken" (2023)
- "Too Late" (featuring Ryan Violet)

== Awards and nominations ==
Year	Award	Category	Work	Result
2021	Boston Music Awards	Dance/Electronic Artist of the Year	The BreakBomb Project	Nominated
2026	Electronic Dance Music Awards	Music Video of the Year	"Too Late" (feat. Ryan Violet)	Won
