= Virsto =

- Type: Private
- Industry: Software
- Founded: 2007
- Headquarters: Sunnyvale, California
- Key people: Mark Davis, CEO, Alex Miroshnichenko, CTO, Serge Pashenkov, VP of Engineering
- Products: Virsto VSI, Virsto VDI
- Website: www.virsto.com

Virsto develops a VM-centric storage hypervisor. The company is privately funded and headquartered in Sunnyvale, California. On February 11, 2013, VMware announced that it had signed a definitive agreement to acquire Virsto.

== History ==
Virsto was founded in 2007 by Mark Davis, Alex Miroshnichenko and Serge Pashenkov. In 2009, the company announced a $7 million series A funding round. In 2011, the company announced a $17 million series B funding round.

== See also ==
- Storage hypervisor
- Storage virtualization
- Software defined storage
