= Pivotal Software =

American technology company

Pivotal Software, Inc.
- Type: Subsidiary
- Industry: Computer software
- Founded: April 2013
- Defunct: December 2019
- Fate: Acquired by VMware
- Headquarters: San Francisco, California, U.S.; Palo Alto, California, U.S.
- Key people: Paul Maritz (Chairman); Rob Mee (CEO); Bill Cook (President); Jason Hurst (Chief of Staff, at founding)
- Revenue: US$509.4M (2017)
- Net income: -US$163.5M (2017)
- Owner: Michael Dell (70%)
- Number of employees: 2,971 (1Q 2020)
- Parent: Broadcom
- Website: pivotal.io

Pivotal Software, Inc. was an American multinational software and services company based in San Francisco that provided cloud platform hosting and consulting services. Since November 2023, Pivotal has been part of Broadcom.

== History ==
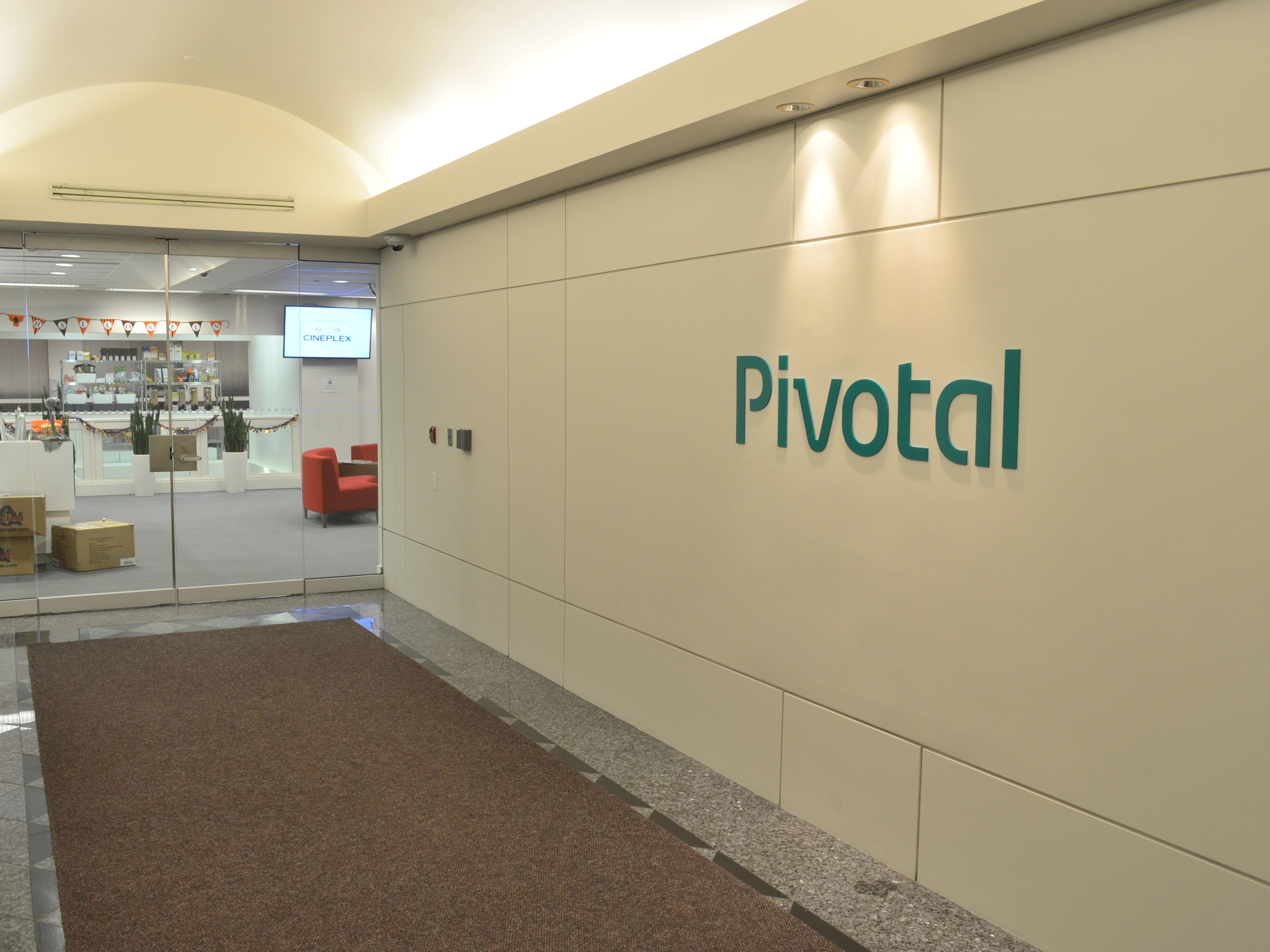
Pivotal office in Toronto

Pivotal Software was formed in 2012 after spinning out of EMC Corporation and VMware (which was majority-owned by EMC). The name came from the Pivotal Labs LLC which had been acquired by EMC, and briefly used the name GoPivotal, Incorporated. On April 24, 2013, the organization announced a US$105 million investment from General Electric (for 10% equity) and Pivotal One, including Cloud Foundry for cloud computing.

Paul Maritz became Pivotal's chief executive immediately after the spin-out. Maritz had joined EMC in February 2008 when Pi Corporation, a company he co-founded, was acquired. He was previously the CEO of VMware. The Greenplum Database (acquired by EMC in 2010) formed the basis of a division selling software for the big data market.

In March 2013, a distribution of Apache Hadoop called Pivotal HD was announced, including a version of the Greenplum software for it called Hawq.

Paul Maritz became Pivotal's Chairman and Rob Mee, founder of Pivotal Labs, became chief executive officer of Pivotal Software on August 18, 2015. In May 2016, a US$253 million round of funding was announced, including an investment from Ford Motor Company. EMC also converted US$400 million of debt into equity at that time.

In March 2018, the company filed for an initial public offering, debuting on the NYSE on April 20, 2018. The trading price began at $15 a share, and closed with a 5% increase on its first day. The company raised $555 million in the IPO.

On August 14, 2019, VMware announced merger discussions with Pivotal, and a definitive agreement to acquire Pivotal Software was signed on August 22, 2019. The merger was completed on December 30, 2019. VMware folded Pivotal into the Tanzu application suite, with the Pivotal Labs consulting group rebranding to become VMware Tanzu Labs in January 2021.

== See also ==
- Pivotal Labs
- Cloud Foundry
- Greenplum
- RabbitMQ
- Spring Framework
