= Bracket Computing =

Bracket Computing was a cloud computing company. It was founded in 2011 by Tom Gillis and Jason Lango, both previously of Ironport Systems, and was based in Mountain View, California. In 2015, the company raised $45 million in an investment round led by Fidelity and Goldman Sachs, bringing its funding total to $130 million. Its primary software offering was called the Computing Cell. As of October 2015, the company employed about 70 people, but planned to hire more software engineers.

On 1 May 2018, VMware announced that Tom Gillis will lead VMware's Network and Security Business Unit. VMware intends to acquire Bracket Computing's intellectual property and other members of Bracket's staff. The Bracket Computing website now redirects to a "403 Forbidden" page.
