= Virtual private cloud =

Pool of shared resources allocated within a public cloud environment

A virtual private cloud (VPC) is an on-demand configurable pool of shared resources allocated within a public cloud environment, providing a certain level of isolation between the different organizations (denoted as users hereafter) using the resources. The isolation between one VPC user and all other users of the same cloud (other VPC users as well as other public cloud users) is achieved normally through allocation of a private IP subnet and a virtual communication construct (such as a VLAN or a set of encrypted communication channels) per user. In a VPC, the previously described mechanism, providing isolation within the cloud, is accompanied with a virtual private network (VPN) function (again, allocated per VPC user) that secures, by means of authentication and encryption, the remote access of the organization to its VPC resources. With the introduction of the described isolation levels, an organization using this service is in effect working on a "virtually private" cloud (that is, as if the cloud infrastructure is not shared with other users), and hence the name VPC.

VPC is most commonly used in the context of cloud infrastructure as a service. In this context, the infrastructure provider, providing the underlying public cloud infrastructure, and the provider realizing the VPC service over this infrastructure, may be different vendors.

== Implementations ==
=== Amazon Web Services ===
Amazon Web Services launched Amazon Virtual Private Cloud on 26 August 2009, which allows the Amazon Elastic Compute Cloud service to be connected to legacy infrastructure over an IPsec VPN. In AWS, the basic VPC is free to use, with users being charged by usage for additional features. EC2 and RDS instances running in a VPC can also be purchased using Reserved Instances, however will have a limitation on resources being guaranteed.

=== Google Cloud ===
Google Cloud resources can be provisioned, connected, and isolated in a virtual private cloud (VPC) across all Google Cloud regions. With Google Cloud, VPCs are global resources and subnets within that VPC are regional resources. This allows users to connect zones and regions without the use of additional networking complexity as all data travels, encrypted in transit and at rest, on Google's own global, private network. Identity management policies and security rules allow for private access to Google's storage, big data, and analytics managed services. VPCs on Google Cloud leverage the security of Google's data centers.

=== IBM Cloud ===
IBM Cloud launched IBM Cloud VPC on 4 June 2019, provides an ability to manage virtual machine-based compute, storage, and networking resources. Pricing for IBM Cloud Virtual Private Cloud is applied separately for internet data transfer, virtual server instances, and block storage used within IBM Cloud VPC.

=== Microsoft Azure ===
Microsoft Azure offers the possibility of setting up a VPC using Virtual Networks.

== See also ==
- Amazon Elastic Compute Cloud
- Cloud computing
- Google Cloud
- Oracle Cloud
- vCloud by VMware
- Virtual private server
