= Diane Greene =

American businesswoman

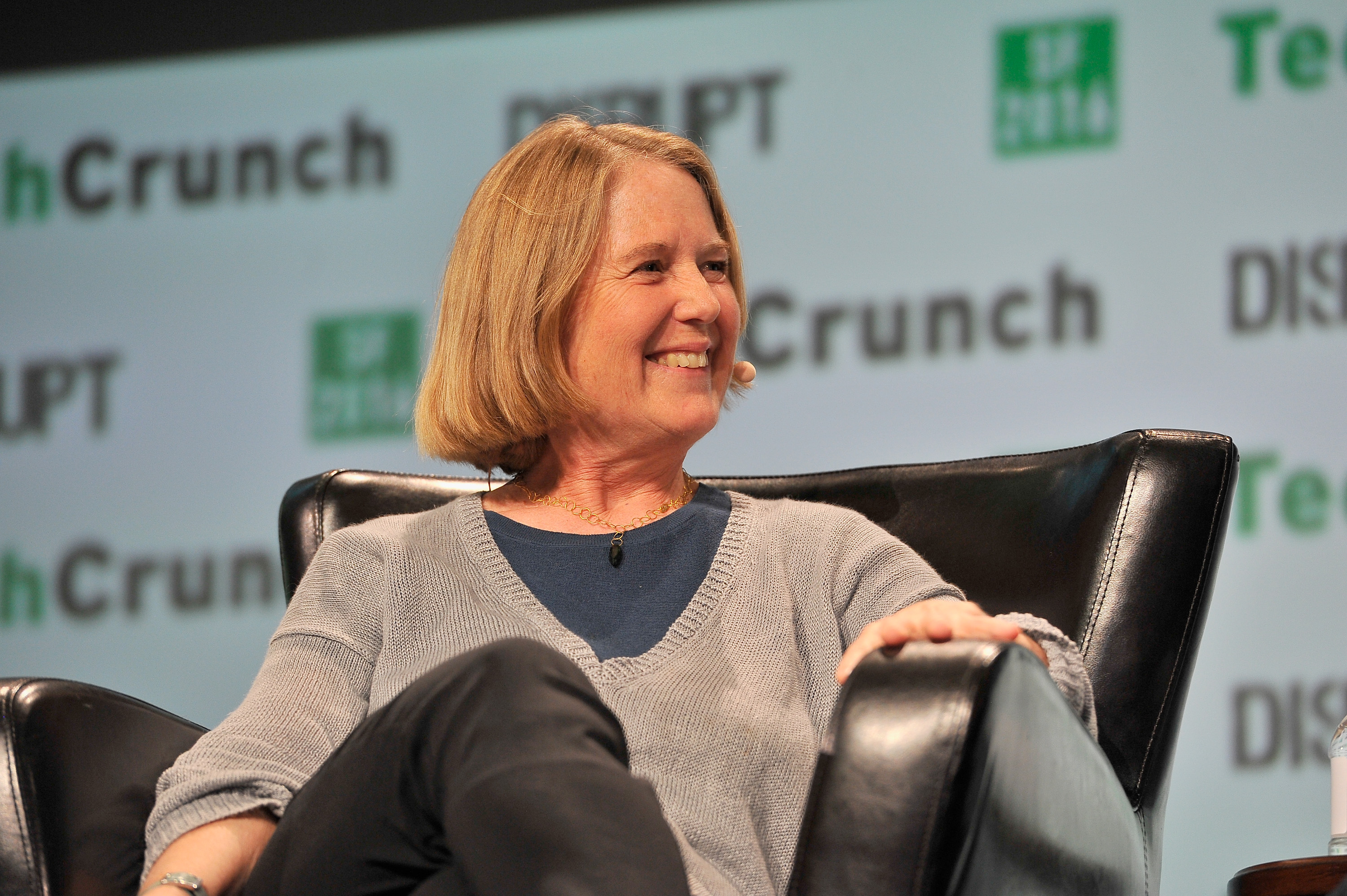
- Greene in 2016
- Born: June 9, 1955 (age 71); Annapolis, Maryland, U.S.
- Education: University of Vermont (BS); Massachusetts Institute of Technology (MArch); University of California, Berkeley (MS)
- Occupations: Board member of SAP; Board member of Stripe; Board member of Wix.com; Board member of A.P. Moller - Maersk
- Known for: Co-founding VMware, leadership at Google
- Spouse: Mendel Rosenblum
- Children: 2

Diane B. Greene (born June 9, 1955) is an American technology entrepreneur and executive. Greene started her career as a naval architect before transitioning to the tech industry, where she was a founder and CEO of VMware from 1998 until 2008. She was a board director of Google and CEO of Google Cloud from 2015 until 2019. She was also the co-founder and CEO of two startups, Bebop and VXtreme, which were acquired by Google and Microsoft, for $380 million and $75 million.

== Early life and education ==
Born in Annapolis, Maryland to an engineer and a teacher, Greene received a bachelor's degree in mechanical engineering from the University of Vermont in 1976 and a master's degree in Naval Architecture from MIT in 1978.

In 1987, she attended and graduated with a master's degree in computer science from the University of California, Berkeley, where she met her future husband and co-founder of VMware, Mendel Rosenblum.

== Career ==
At age 19, Greene ran the first Windsurfing World Championship and won the national women's dinghy championship in 1976. Early in her career, Greene worked as a naval architect, where she designed ocean-going vessels and offshore structures. She also ran engineering for Windsurfing International. After getting her second master's degree in computer science, she transitioned to the tech industry and worked as an engineer and manager at Sybase, Tandem Computers, and Silicon Graphics. She also co-founded and was CEO of VXtreme, which was acquired by Microsoft and became the basis for Microsoft's movie player.

=== VMware ===
In 1998, Greene, Mendel Rosenblum, Scott Devine, Edward Wang and Edouard Bugnion founded VMware. With Greene as CEO, VMware created the market for mainstream virtualization and pioneered x86 virtualization. They first introduced the technology on the desktop as a way to run multiple operating systems side by side without requiring a reboot. They then introduced virtualization on the server as a way to simplify system management, increase server utilization, and save power. Today, virtualization is the ubiquitous way to run servers.

In 2004, VMware was acquired by EMC Corporation for $635 million, and Greene continued as CEO. VMware functioned as a subsidiary, keeping its name, brand, and products and achieving a $2 billion run rate. In 2007, VMware went public to a $19.1 billion valuation, making it the largest tech IPO of 2007. On July 8, 2008, Greene was fired as president and CEO by the VMware board of directors and replaced by Paul Maritz, a retired 14-year Microsoft veteran who was running the cloud computing business of VMware parent company EMC. Greene was asked to stay on and take a significant role in the company, but she declined.

Greene has spoken about her experience founding and scaling VMware at Stanford, at YCombinator's Startup School, on (Linkedin co-founder) Reid Hoffman's "Masters of Scale" podcast series, and more.

=== Google ===
On January 12, 2012, Greene was appointed to the Google board of directors. Greene filled the 10th seat on Google's board of directors, a seat that had previously been filled in October 2009 by Arthur D. Levinson.

In November 2015, Greene was named CEO of Google Cloud following the acquisition of her startup, Bebop. As CEO of Google Cloud, Greene created Google's first enterprise-capable business unit. A few months after she stepped down as CEO of Google Cloud in January 2019, Google reported that the company's cloud unit had reached $8 billion in annualized revenue. Greene was succeeded as CEO of Google Cloud by former Oracle executive Thomas Kurian. She retained a seat on the board of Alphabet until June of the same year.

=== Board memberships ===
Greene has served as a board member of Alphabet, Intuit, Khan Academy, SAP, Stripe, A.P. Moller - Maersk, and Wix.com. In 2020, she was elected chair of the MIT board of directors. She has also served as co-chair of the advisory board at the University of California, Berkeley's College of Engineering.

== Awards ==
- In 2007, Fortune named Greene as one of America's 50 Most Powerful Women.
- Greene and Mendel Rosenblum received the IEEE Computer Society's Computer Entrepreneur Award in 2011 for "creating a virtualization platform" as founders of VMware.
- Greene was a judge for the Queen Elizabeth Prize for Engineering in 2013.
- In 2017, Greene was listed on Bloomberg's 50 List of the world's most influential people.
- In 2017, Greene was recognized with Abie Award for Technical Leadership from the Anita Borg Institute as "one of the most iconic technology leaders of the last 20 years."
- In 2017, Greene received an Honorary Doctor of Science from the University of Vermont.
- In 2018, Greene was named one of America's Top 50 Women in Tech by Forbes.
- In 2018, Greene was elected a member of the US National Academy of Engineering for contributions in transforming virtualization from a concept to an industry.
- In 2024, Greene received an Honorary Doctorate from Webb Institute.

== Personal life ==
Greene met her husband, Mendel Rosenblum, while at Berkeley. The couple has two children together, a son and a daughter, and live in Stanford, California. Greene is also an expert crabber and sailor, having grown up doing both in Maryland.

== See also ==
- VMware
- EMC Corporation
- Google
- Alphabet
- Intuit
- SAP
- Stripe
- A.P. Moller - Maersk
- Wix.com
