= SimOS =

SimOS was a full system simulator, developed in the Stanford University in the late 1990s in the research group of Mendel Rosenblum. It was enabled to run IRIX 5.3 on MIPS, and Unix variants on Alpha.

== Derivatives ==
=== SimOS-PPC ===
SimOS-PPC was forked from the original SimOS as IBM's internal project, running a modified AIX kernel and userland in an emulator, developed by Tom Keller and his team in the Austin lab of IBM. IBM used SimOS to facilitate development of new systems. The software used in this project is now publicly available for download for AIX 4.3 licensees.

=== Linux/SimOS ===
Linux/SimOS was "...a Linux operating system port to SimOS, which is a complete machine simulator from Stanford. The motivation for Linux/SimOS is to alleviate the limitations of SimOS, which only supports proprietary operating systems."

=== SimBCM ===
SimBCM is an open source full system simulator based on SimOS. It simulates BCM1250, a dual-core MIPS64 SOC of Broadcom. The entire source code of SimBCM is distributed under GPL. It is capable of running the Linux kernel or the NICTA::Pistachio L4 microkernel.

== Similar products ==
=== Simics ===
The currently available commercial product, Virtutech Simics was derived from the work of the Swedish Institute of Computer Science, and was originally developed to run a full system simulation of Solaris on SPARC platform. Simics was used by IBM to help develop AIX 6.1 on a simulation of the POWER6 hardware.

=== RSIM ===
RSIM was the "Rice Simulator for ILP Multiprocessors", developed at the Rice University in the late 1990s. It was able to run on Solaris, IRIX and HP-UX. The simulator is available under the University of Illinois/NCSA Open Source License agreement. The development is finished.

M5 Developed at the University of Michigan, M5 simulates Alpha and SPARC hardware, with support for other architectures in progress. [10]
