= Mifos Initiative =

American financial software nonprofit

- Founded: October 2011
- Type: 501(c)(3)
- Purpose: Microfinance; Financial inclusion
- Location: Mountain View, California, United States
- Origins: Grameen Foundation
- Products: Mifos X Payment Hub EE; Mifos Gazelle; Mifos X Mobile Applications
- Key people: Ed Cable (CEO)
- Website: mifos.org

The Mifos Initiative is a U.S.-based non-profit that exists to support and collectively lead the open source Mifos X project, alongside its other projects Payment Hub Enterprise Edition, Mifos Gazelle and Mifos X Mobile Applications. Founded in October 2011, the organization encompasses a community of financial service providers, technology specialists, financial services experts and open source developers working together to grow the Mifos X open source platform for financial services. Its goal is to speed the elimination of poverty by enabling financial service providers to more effectively and efficiently deliver responsible financial services to the world's 2.5 billion poor and unbanked.

== History ==
Development of the software began as an initiative of the Grameen Foundation in 2004. It was initiated by James Dailey and Tapan Parikh, and launched as open-source software Mifos in 2006. The name "Mifos" originally came from an acronym "Micro Finance Open Source", but is now used as the brand, rather than an acronym. Mifos existed within Grameen Foundation until 2011, when it was decided that Mifos would split off to be an independent, open-source entity.

On June 1, 2011, Grameen Foundation announced that it would be ending its direct involvement with the Mifos Initiative and transitioning the project to a new organization, the Mifos Initiative, which then controlled the Mifos and Mifos X projects.

In 2015, Mifos contributed the core Mifos X platform to Apache Software Foundation and the project is now called Apache Fineract(R).

Since 2015 Mifos continued to maintain Mifos X as a number of modules and applications that worked on top of the Fineract(R) backend. Mifos X was recognised as a Digital Public Good since the CoP for Financial Inclusion identified 7 key DPGs in their technical assessment in 2021. Mifos X has maintained this recognition since.

Mifos Initiative also stewards a number of other open-source projects that focus on financial services (Core Banking, Payment Orchestration).

Payment Hub EE - A payment orchestration system which supports DFSP connections to instant inclusive payment rails, account management systems, Payment Schemas and Fraud Detection systems. Payment Hub EE was recognised as a Digital Public Good in 2024. Payment Hub EE is also recognised by GovStack as a Level 1 Payments Building Block Solution.

Mifos Gazelle - A DPI as a Solution Deployment Tool, launched in 2024.

A range of Mobile Applications that work with Mifos Projects.

== Community ==
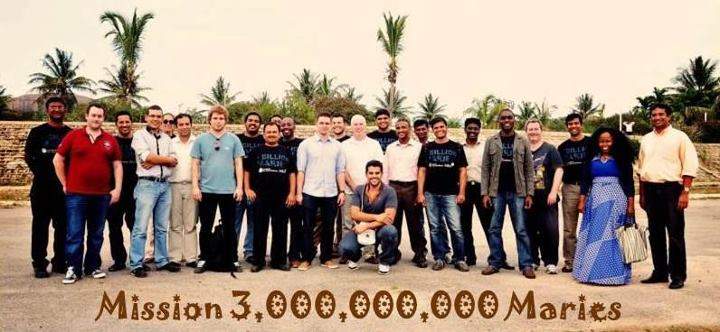
Mifos Initiative community group photo during October 2012 summit in Bangalore

The Mifos community includes developers, implementers, and users from various countries who collaborate through mailing lists, Slack, working groups, internships, attendance and promotion of DPGs and Open Source at conferences. Previously Mifos has organised annual conferences.

Mifos previously organized an annual summit for developers and users with conferences, exhibitions and other audience-oriented events. The 2012 summit was held in Bangalore, and in 2013, it was held at Jaipur in the month of October. Held in Kuampala, Uganda, the 2014 Summit was a four-day event with a large focus on hands-on training for partners and users, collaborative tech sessions for contributors, and educational sessions focussing on fin-tech and the financial inclusion sector.

Mifos has also participated in several other independent events. In 2013, Mifos has participated in Google Summer of Code as well as Random Hacks of Kindness during RHoK Global December 2012. Moreover, Mifos has been part of the FinDEVr San Francisco 2014 event, acting as a sponsor. One of Mifos' members, James Dailey (board member and Chief Innovation Officer), took the stage to discuss the reinvention of banking. On the first of November, Mifos Initiative also took part in the Global Islamic Microfinance Forum, held in Dubai, UAE.

== Management ==
President/CEO of Mifos Initiative is Edward Cable.

=== Board of directors ===
- Allison Baller
- Zaheda Bhorat
- Min Tha Gyaw
- Shashi Raghunandan
- Andreas Vagelaötos
- Edward Cable (Current CEO & President)

Previously serving Board members

- Craig Chelius
- Suresh Krishna (managing director of Grameen Financial Services Private Ltd)
- Paul Maritz (Chairman of the Board and CEO of Pivotal)
- Michael Vorburger
- Dave Neary
- James Dailey

=== Advisors to Board ===
- Diego Francisco Moncayo Miño
- Simone Tarantino
- Marie Valdez
- Deepa Prahalad
- Vincent Alimi
- Ali Hussein Kassim

== Qualifications and prizes ==
- Mifos earns high ratings on CGAP Software Listings
- Mifos won a Duke's Choice Award in 2009 for "Java Technology for the Open Source Community"
- Mifos participated in the Google Summer Of Code 2009, 2010, 2013, 2014, 2016, 2017, 2018, 2019, 2020, 2022, 2023, 2024, 2025.
- Mifos also came as a runner up to the 'Fintech for Good' award, coming second after Deutsche Bank – Community Hackathons.
- Mifos was shortlisted for the 11:FS Fintech for Good Award in 2024,
