= Theodore John Conrad =

American thief and fugitive (1949–2021)

Theodore Conrad
- Born: Theodore John Conrad; July 10, 1949; Denver, Colorado, U.S.
- Disappeared: July 14, 1969; Cleveland, Ohio, U.S.
- Died: May 18, 2021 (aged 71); Lynnfield, Massachusetts, U.S.
- Other name: Thomas Randele
- Education: Lakewood High School, New England College, Cuyahoga Community College
- Occupations: Bank teller, golf pro, car salesman
- Known for: Evaded capture for 52 years after embezzling $215,000 from a bank
- Criminal charges: Embezzlement, falsifying bank records
- Capture status: Deceased (never captured)
- Wanted by: U.S. Marshals Service
- Time at large: July 11, 1969–May 18, 2021

Theodore John Conrad (July 10, 1949 – May 18, 2021) was an American bank teller who stole $215,000 (equivalent to $1.89 million in 2025) in cash from the vault of a Cleveland bank in July 1969. He was never apprehended or convicted, but he privately admitted to the crime on his deathbed. He assumed the name of Thomas Randele and eventually settled in Massachusetts, where he lived the rest of his life. Conrad avoided capture for more than five decades. Conrad confessed to his family before his death; shortly after his death, his identity was discovered by the son of one of the original investigators using details from the obituary of Thomas Randele.

== Early life ==
Conrad was born in Denver, Colorado, the son of Edward and Ruthabeth (née Krueger) Conrad. His parents divorced while Conrad was in elementary school. He moved with his mother and sister to Lakewood, Ohio after the divorce and attended Lakewood High School, graduating in 1967. Conrad was popular in high school and was elected to the student council; he was very bright, with an IQ of 135. He went on to attend New England College, where his father, a retired captain in the Navy, was an assistant professor of political science. Conrad left the college after one semester and attended Cuyahoga Community College.

== Theft and flight ==
In early 1969, Conrad went to work at the Society National Bank headquarters at 127 Public Square in Cleveland. (Note: Society Bank remains in operation today as the direct predecessor to the modern-day KeyBank, having assumed that name in 1994. Despite being the bank in which Conrad stole the money, the modern-day KeyCorp did not comment on the posthumous identification of Conrad.) He worked in the cash vault as a teller, and his job involved "packaging money to be delivered to Society branches around town. It was a position for a trusted employee." According to a summary report compiled years later by the U.S. Marshals Service, "To all appearances, Conrad was that All-American boy whose character was not questioned and seemed to be a model of responsibility during a turbulent time."

On Friday, July 11, 1969, Conrad, then 20 years old, went to the vault and stuffed $215,000 in cash (equivalent to $1.89 million in 2025) into a paper bag and walked off with it. The loss was discovered only the following Monday, giving him a two-day head start to flee and hide. There was little security at the bank, and Conrad had never been fingerprinted. Immediately after his disappearance was discovered, a warrant was issued for his arrest on charges of embezzlement and misappropriating funds. In September 1969, Conrad was indicted in federal court on charges of embezzlement and making a false entry in the records of the bank.

Prior to the theft, Conrad had been obsessed with the 1968 film The Thomas Crown Affair, starring Steve McQueen as a millionaire bank robber. Conrad "saw it more than a half dozen times" and "bragged to his friends about how easy it would be to take money from the bank and even told them he planned to do so". In 1969, Conrad confessed to his role in the theft in a letter to his girlfriend and expressed regret for the crime.

Conrad first went to Washington D.C. after the theft before moving to Los Angeles and, in 1970, settling in Massachusetts. After moving to the state, Conrad assumed the name "Thomas Randele". He married in 1982 and the couple had a daughter. Conrad worked as a golf pro at the Pembroke Country Club, rising to manager, and worked for luxury automotive dealerships for 40 years. It was only after he had died that police found out he was the thief. He was well-liked by local police and led a law-abiding life in disguise. This, and the lack of fingerprints, hampered the hunt for him.

== Investigation and postmortem discovery ==
While Conrad raised his family in Massachusetts, law enforcement was hunting unsuccessfully for him. Agents from all FBI field offices joined in the search, compiling notes and documentation that filled 20 binders. The search for Conrad spanned 52 years, as investigators followed leads that took them to Washington D.C., Inglewood, California, West Texas, Oregon, and Honolulu. The case was featured on the true crime television program America's Most Wanted.

The hunt for Conrad went on for so long that one of the deputy U.S. marshals involved in the original investigation, John K. Elliott, was succeeded on the case by his son Peter J. Elliott, who became U.S. Marshal of the Northern District of Ohio in 2003. John Elliott retired in 1990 and never stopped hunting for Conrad. He died in March 2020.

The case remained cold until November 2021, when Peter Elliott determined that Conrad had been living as Randele in Lynnfield, Massachusetts, 16 miles (26 km) north of Boston. Conrad had died of lung cancer on May 18, 2021, telling his daughter his real identity after his first chemotherapy session in March 2021. Elliott was tipped off to Conrad's whereabouts by an obituary for Randele, which listed his birth date as July 10, 1947, exactly two years earlier than his real birth date of July 10, 1949. His parents' first names in the obituary, Edward and Ruthabeth, and college, New England College, were the same as Conrad's, and his mother's maiden name of Krueger was the same as well. Conrad's signature, obtained by investigators from a college application, was also highly similar to Randele's. His family were not charged for not alerting authorities to his confession. Elliott has not disclosed how he learned of the obituary.
