= OneTrust =

American software company

OneTrust, LLC
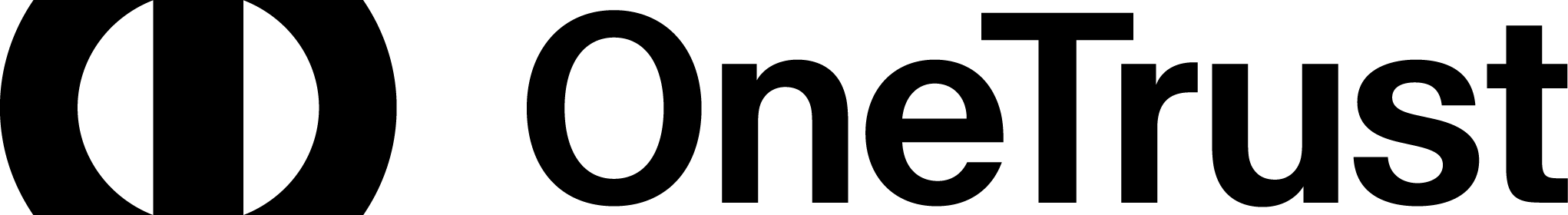
- Type: Private
- Industry: Software
- Founded: 2016; 10 years ago
- Founder: Kabir Barday
- Headquarters: Atlanta, Georgia
- Key people: Kabir Barday, Alan Dabbiere
- Products: Privacy and security software
- Number of employees: 2,300
- Website: www.onetrust.com

OneTrust, LLC is an American software company headquartered in Atlanta, Georgia. It develops governance, risk, and compliance (GRC) software with a focus on privacy, security, data protection, and AI governance. Its platform includes tools for consent management, data mapping, third-party risk assessments, and regulatory compliance automation. As of 2025, the company reports more than 14,000 customers worldwide and over 300 patents. The company occupies a 74,000-square-foot headquarters along the Atlanta Beltline and maintains regional offices in London, Bangalore, Madrid, Paris, Munich, Singapore and Melbourne.

== History ==
OneTrust was founded in 2016 by Kabir Barday in Atlanta, Georgia, initially focusing on software to help organizations comply with emerging global privacy laws such as the General Data Protection Regulation (GDPR) and the California Consumer Privacy Act (CCPA).

The company expanded its product offerings and entered adjacent markets such as third-party risk and security assurance through acquisitions. It also attracted investment to support international expansion and development of new tools related to compliance automation and data governance.

In March 2026, the company announced a new brand positioning on AI-Ready Governance.

In June 2022, OneTrust laid off approximately 950 employees, or 25% of its workforce, citing changing investor priorities and market conditions.

== AI capabilities and governance ==
In 2025, OneTrust launched the Privacy Breach Response Agent, built with Microsoft Security Copilot, designed to automate incident evaluation and breach notification mapping. The company also integrated with Azure OpenAI to support compliance transparency and model governance functions. In 2024, AI-based features were added to the DataGuidance regulatory research platform, enabling regulatory text search and summarization.

== Acquisitions ==
OneTrust has acquired several companies to expand its software offerings:

- March 2019: DataGuidance, a UK-based regulatory intelligence platform.
- June 2020: Integris Software, focused on data discovery and classification.
- April 2021: Docuvision (AI redaction), Tugboat Logic (security compliance), Convercent (ethics and whistleblowing), and Planetly (carbon tracking).

== Global Partners ==
Chile: https://alayiatrust.com
