= Zubaida Bai =

Indian Social Entrepreneur

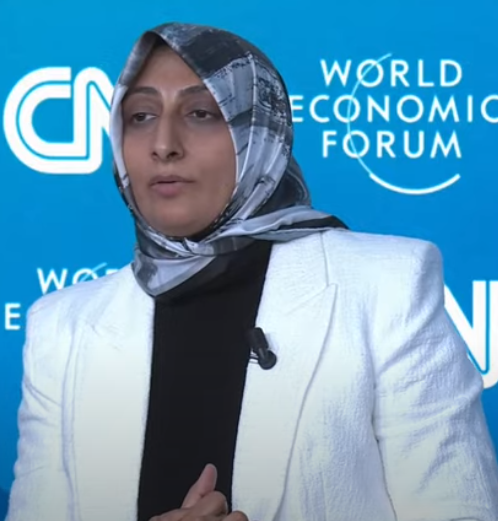
- Speaking at the World Economic Forum's Growth Summit 2023
- Born: Chennai, India
- Education: Dalarna University College; Colorado State University
- Occupations: Social entrepreneur, president and CEO of Grameen Foundation
- Website: www.ayzh.com; www.zubaidabai.com

Zubaida Bai is an Indian social entrepreneur, an expert in the field of health products for the developing world, and the president and CEO of Grameen Foundation. Her company, Ayzh, designs healthcare products for women and girls living in poverty.

== Biography ==
Bai was raised in Chennai, India. She was the first person in her family to pursue post-secondary education; her female relatives typically married in adolescence. Bai holds a master's degree in Mechanical Engineering Specializing in Development of Modular Products, and an MBA in Social and Sustainable Enterprises.

== Career ==
Due to unsanitary birth conditions, Bai developed an infection after giving birth to her first child, Yasin. which "caused her to suffer for years." This inspired her to help rural women who needed access to healthcare.

Bai founded the company Ayzh in 2010, with the goal of bringing simplicity, dignity, and access to the poorest women in India via their Clean Birth Kit in a Purse by ensuring a safe and sanitary delivery.

In November 2022, Bai was named president and CEO of Grameen Foundation, an international development nonprofit that works with women and girls to end poverty and hunger.

== Awards ==
Bai was named a TED Fellow in 2009, an Ashoka Maternal Health fellow in 2010–2011, and an Echoing Green fellow in 2012. In 2011, her design for JANMA, a clean birth kit, was selected by INDEX Awards as one of 61 products "globally designed to improve life."

In June 2016, Zubaida was named an SDG Pioneer at the UN's SDG Global Compact Summit for her work.
