= Mendel Rosenblum =

American computer scientist (born 1962)

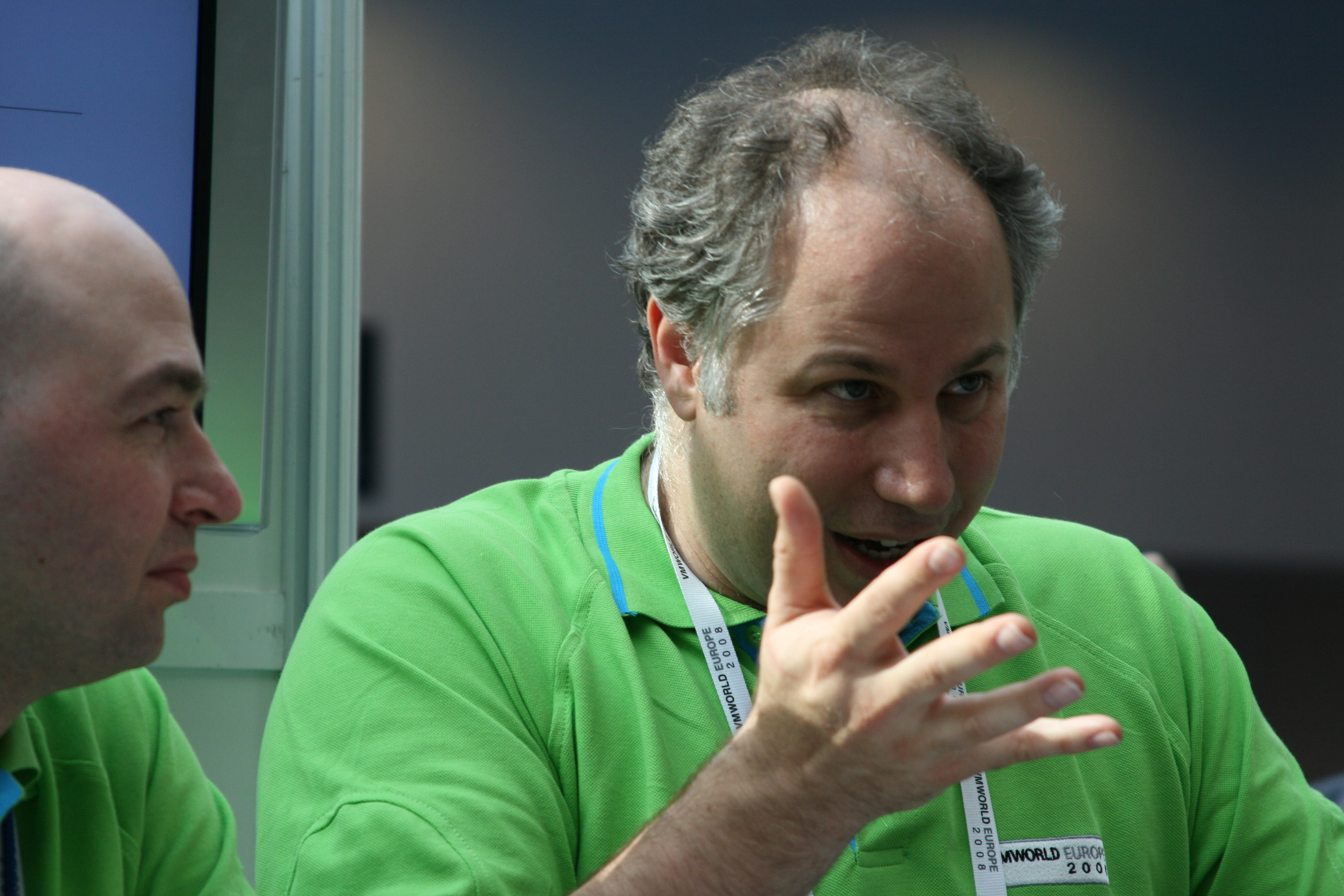
- Rosenblum at VMworld Europe 2008
- Born: 1962 (age 63–64)
- Education: University of California, Berkeley; University of Virginia
- Spouse: Diane Greene

Mendel Rosenblum (born 1962) is a professor of computer science at Stanford University and co-founder of VMware.

== Early life ==
Mendel Rosenblum was born in 1962. He attended the University of Virginia, where he received a degree in mathematics. While at UVA, he was a member of Phi Sigma Kappa.

He graduated with a Ph.D. in computer science from the University of California, Berkeley, where he met his future wife and co-founder of VMware, Diane Greene.

== Career ==
Rosenblum is a professor of computer science at Stanford University. His research group developed SimOS.

Rosenblum is a co-founder of VMware. He served as its chief scientist until his resignation on September 10, 2008, shortly after his wife Diane Greene stepped down as the company's CEO.

Since 2008, Rosenblum is a Fellow of the Association for Computing Machinery "for contributions to reinventing virtual machines", and had previously received the ACM SIGOPS Mark Weiser Award (2002).

In 2009, he was elected as a member into the National Academy of Engineering for fundamental contributions to computer operating systems and virtual machines.
