= George Schussel =

American businessman and entrepreneur (born 1941)

- Born: 1941 (age 84–85); Occupied France
- Occupations: Businessman and entrepreneur
- Known for: Founder and chairman of the Digital Consulting Institute and computer conferences and expos
- Spouse: Sandra "Sandy" Schussel (m. 1964)

George Schussel (born 1941) is an American businessman, entrepreneur, and writer. Schussel became best known as the founder and chairman of the Digital Consulting Institute (DCI) and promoting computer technology in conferences and expos.

Schussel's expertise on database, computing architectures, the internet and information management issues inspired him to travel to many countries presenting lectures that gave his views on the latest computer technologies and probable directions for the future of computer technology. As of 2004, Schussel had given over 1,000 seminars for other technology professionals in countries such as France, UK, Belgium, Venezuela, Canada, Mexico, South Africa, Japan, and Australia.

George Schussel was the inventor and chairperson of computer industry trade shows such as Database World, Client/Server World, and Creating the Real Time Enterprise. His lectures had scored 9 on a 10-point scale and were noted for underlining and explaining technical issues, while focusing on the business benefits and uses of technology.

Schussel wrote the 1985 book Data Management: Past, present and future (Critical technology report), as well as co-authored the 1994 book Rightsizing Information Systems (Professional Reference). He has also authored or co-authored over 100 articles or columns in leading computer industry journals such as Computerworld, Datamation, Client Server Today and Data Based Advisor.

== Early life and education ==
Schussel was born 1941 in occupied France during World War II. In 1942, Schussel's father brought the family out of German-occupied territory into Spain, and subsequently into the United States.

Schussel received his bachelor's degree from the University of California in physics and mathematics in 1961. Afterwards, he was accepted into Harvard University, and there received his master's degree in applied mathematics and computer science in 1962. In 1966 he received his doctorate from Harvard Business School in marketing and computer science. After graduation, he spent time lecturing and held a faculty appointment at the University of Southern California, Harvard, MIT, and the University of Alabama.

== Career ==
Prior to founding DCI in 1983, Schussel was vice president and CIO at the American Mutual Group of insurance companies in Wakefield, Massachusetts. There he was the senior manager for the administration of a multimillion-dollar computer budget and 200 full-time personnel handling all data processing for the American Mutual Group.

=== Digital Consulting Institute ===
George Schussel was the founder, as well as the chairman of Digital Consulting Institute (DCI), which was started in 1982 in his Lynnfield, Massachusetts, home.

As of 1998, DCI was the largest American-owned information systems conference and trade show company, holding small to large seminars across the world intended for professional audiences. As chairman, Schussel forecasted industry trends as well as identified new fields of opportunity for DCI trade shows. His input was crucial in the company's compounded growth rate of 30% per year through the 1990s. DCI's revenue was generated from ticket sales to participants who attended their seminars, trade shows, and other events, as well as from the contracting and selling of booth space to vendors participating in their shows. DCI also ran trade show events for other companies such as Sybase, IBM and Microsoft.

During his time at DCI, Schussel was credited as having consulted major clients such as Cullinet, Computer Associates, Revelation Technologies, Hewlett Packard, Sybase, AT&T/NCR, DEC, Sequent Computer Systems, Borland and IBM.

=== Tax dispute ===
In 2001, the IRS investigated DCI's 1995 tax filings, a period during which Schussel had been company CEO, later concluding that DCI had violated US tax laws. DCI's position, backed by tax counsel, was that its reporting on international income had been handled in accordance with US laws similar to other companies with foreign subsidiaries. In 2004, Schussel, as CEO, was charged with conspiracy and tax evasion. By 2017, all civil and criminal issues resulting from this case had been settled.

== Recognition and memberships ==
In 1998, Schussel was a recipient of the IEEE Computer Society's Computer Entrepreneur award for his important contributions to the computing industry and profession as an entrepreneurial leader, advisor, and member. Other recipients of the Computer Entrepreneur award that year were Bill Gates, Paul Allen, Steve Jobs, and Steve Wozniak. Schussel was also the recipient of the Outstanding Industrial Engineer of the Year award from the Institute of Industrial Engineers.

Additionally, Schussel was a fellow of the American Association for the Advancement of Science, and had CDP certification from the Data Processing Management Association.

== Philanthropy ==
=== Brigham and Women's Hospital & Harvard Medical School ===
In December 2025, Dr. Benjamin Gewurz, Associate Program Head, PhD Program in Virology at Harvard Medical School (HMS), became the George and Sandra K. Schussel Associate Professor of Medicine in the Field of Infectious Diseases. The Gewurz lab researches the Epstein-Barr virus (EBV) which is implicated in many cancers including various lymphomas, nasopharyngeal carcinomas, and nearly 10% of all stomach cancers. EBV is also a strong suspect in autoimmune diseases, notably lupus and multiple sclerosis (MS). Since EBV infects more than 90% of the global population and is currently understood to be correlated with multiple malignancies and autoimmune diseases, better understanding and possible prevention of EBV infection through vaccination, could represent a monumental advance in modern medicine.

Schussel and his wife Sandra chose to support the Gewurz Lab at Brigham and Women's Hospital (BWH) partly since Sandra received her education in nursing at Peter Bent Brigham Hospital, which in 1980 merged with two other HMS teaching hospitals, Robert Breck Brigham Hospital and the Boston Hospital for Women, to form today's BWH. Schussel also has Harvard University connections since receiving graduate degrees there in both 1962 and 1966.

=== MIT Sloan School of Management ===
In March 2000, Schussel was recognized by MIT Sloan School of Management for his philanthropic contribution in 1998 for the endowment of a Professorship of Management Science chair. Currently, the chair is held by Hazhir Rahmandad who is the Schussel Family Professor of Management Science and System Dynamics. The inaugural chair was held by Dr. Jack Rockart as the George and Sandra Schussel distinguished senior lecturer of information technology. Subsequently, beginning in 2001, the chair was held by Erik Brynjolfsson whose book ‘Race Against the Machine’ was CIO Insight's No. 1 pick for the top 10 IT-Business Books of 2011. Schussel has also served on the Dean's Leadership Council at the MIT Sloan School.

Although Schussel is not an alumnus of MIT, while a graduate student at Harvard, the classes he took at MIT gave him an early foundation in computer storage and retrieval techniques, which later proved valuable as he became expert in database technology. In addition, Schussel's family members held six degrees from the school, while one of his daughters met her husband there.

=== Dana Farber Cancer Institute ===
Beginning in 2016, the Schussels created the Schussel Family Fund which provides research funds to the Weinstock Laboratory of the Dana Farber Cancer Institute in Boston. A primary goal of the laboratory was to understand and develop clinical treatments for T-cell lymphomas. In 2017, George and Sandra became members of DFCI's Joint Visiting Committee on Basic Science. Additional funds have gone towards supporting research at the Smilow Cancer Hospital on T-cell lymphomas.

== Prison Justice for America (PJA) ==
In 2013 Schussel founded Prison Justice for America, a non-profit, resource website to connect mentors with former inmates to aid in their reintegration. As the US incarcerates a higher percentage of its citizens than any other country in the world, PJA's belief was that the "tough on crime" approach had failed society. Over 100 individuals received assistance before the site closed in 2017.
