= VMworld =

Global multi-cloud conference

VMworld is a global multi-cloud conference, hosted by VMware. It is the largest multi-cloud-specific event. It has been held in San Diego, California in 2004; Las Vegas, Nevada in 2005, 2008, 2011, 2016, 2017, and 2018; Los Angeles, California in 2006; and San Francisco, California in 2007, 2009, 2010, 2012, 2013, 2014, 2015 and 2019. Due to the COVID-19 pandemic, it converted to a fully digital event in 2020.

The conference was renamed VMware Explore in 2022.

There is also an annual VMworld conference that has been held since 2008 in Europe, usually in October or November following the US conference. The European conference has been held in France, Denmark, and Spain.

The conference normally lasts between three and five days and consists of breakout sessions, panels, exhibit hall, and hands-on labs. The first conference was held in the Fall of 2004 and attracted more than 1,600 attendees and over the years has attracted over 20,000 attendees annually.

Sponsors and partners include AWS, Cisco, NetApp, Intel, HPE, Dell EMC, Hitachi, IBM, Sandisk, and Samsung.

== Events ==
2021
Date:	Global: October 5–7, 2021
Facility:	Online Event
Attendance:	TBD
Marketing Tagline:	"Imagine That"

2020
Date:	Global: September 29 - October 1, 2020
Facility:	Online Event
Attendance:	TBD
Marketing Tagline:	"Possible Together"

2019
Date:	US: August 25–29, 2019 EMEA: November 4–7, 2019
City:	US: San Francisco, CA EMEA: Barcelona, SP
Facility:	US: The Moscone Center EMEA: Fira de Barcelona- Gran Via
Attendance:	US: TBD EMEA: TBD
Marketing Tagline:	"Make your mark..."
Band:	US: OneRepublic EMEA: Stereophonics

2018
Date:	US: August 26–30, 2018 EMEA: November 5–8, 2018
City:	US: Las Vegas, NV EMEA: Barcelona, SP
Facility:	US: Mandalay Bay Convention Center EMEA: Fira de Barcelona- Gran Via
Attendance:	US: 23,000+ EMEA: ~13,000
Marketing Tagline:	"Possible Begins with You..."
Band:	US: Royal Machines + Fred Durst + Macy Gray EMEA: The Kooks + Counterfeit Stones

2017
Date:	US: August 27–31, 2017 EMEA: September 11–14, 2017
City:	US: Las Vegas, NV EMEA: Barcelona, SP
Facility:	US: Mandalay Bay Convention Center EMEA: Fira de Barcelona- Gran Via
Attendance:	US: Estimated 19,500 per discussions with VMware employees at VMworld EMEA: ?
Marketing Tagline:	"I am..."
Band:	US: Blink182 & Bleachers EMEA: Kaiser Chiefs
Media:	Backpack Show Graphics

2016
Date:	US: August 28-September 1, 2016 EMEA: October 17–20, 2016
City:	US: Las Vegas, NV EMEA: Barcelona, SP
Facility:	US: Mandalay Bay Convention Center EMEA: Fira de Barcelona- Gran Via
Attendance:	US: 23,000 EMEA: 10,000
Marketing Tagline:	"be_Tomorrow"
Band:	US: Fall Out Boy & Capital Cities EMEA: Empire of the Sun
Media:	Backpack Presentation Template Show Graphics

2015
Date:	US: August 30-September 3, 2015 EMEA: October 12–15, 2015
City:	US: San Francisco, CA EMEA: Barcelona, SP
Facility:	US: Moscone Center EMEA: Fira de Barcelona- Gran Via
Attendance:	US: 23,000 EMEA: 10,000
Marketing Tagline:	"Ready for Any"
Band:	US: Neon Trees & Alabama Shakes EMEA: Faithless
Media:	Backpack Presentation Template Show Graphics

2014
Date:	US: August 24–28, 2014 EMEA: October 12–15, 2014
City:	US: San Francisco, CA EMEA: Barcelona, SP
Facility:	US: Moscone Center EMEA: Fira de Barcelona- Gran Via
Attendance:	US: 26,000 EMEA: 11,000
Marketing Tagline:	"No Limits"
Band:	US: The Black Keys EMEA: Simple Minds
Media:	Backpack Presentation Template Show Graphics

2013
Date:	US: August 25–29, 2013 EMEA: October 13–16, 2013
City:	US: San Francisco, CA EMEA: Barcelona, SP
Facility:	US: Moscone Center EMEA: Fira de Barcelona- Gran Via
Attendance:	US: 22,500 EMEA: 8,600
Marketing Tagline:	"Defy Convention"
Band:	US: Train & Imagine Dragons EMEA: Taio Cruz
Media:	Backpack Presentation Template Show Graphics

2012
Date:	US: August 26–30, 2012 EMEA: October 9–11, 2012
City:	US: San Francisco, CA EMEA: Barcelona, SP
Facility:	US: Moscone Center EMEA: Fira de Barcelona- Gran Via
Attendance:	US: 21,000 EMEA: 8,200
Marketing Tagline:	"Right Here Right Now"
Band:	US: Jon Bon Jovi and the Kings of Suburbia EMEA: N/A
Media:	Backpack Presentation Template Show Graphics

2011
Date:	US: August 29-September 1, 2011 EMEA: October 18–20, 2011
City:	US: Las Vegas, NV EMEA: Copenhagen, DK
Facility:	US: Sands Convention Center EMEA: Bella Center
Attendance:	US: 19,000 EMEA: 6,500
Marketing Tagline:	"Your Cloud. Own It."
Band:	US: The Killers EMEA: N/A
Media:	Backpack Presentation Template Show Graphics

2010
Date:	US: August 30-September 2, 2010 EMEA: October 11–13, 2010
City:	US: San Francisco, CA EMEA: Copenhagen, DK
Facility:	US: Moscone Center EMEA: Bella Center
Attendance:	US: 17,000 EMEA: 5,700
Marketing Tagline:	"Virtual Roads, Actual Clouds"
Band:	US: INXS EMEA: Bjorn Again (Cover Band)
Media:	Backpack Presentation Template Show Graphics

2009
Date:	US: August 31-September 3, 2009 EMEA: February 24–26, 2009
City:	US: San Francisco, CA EMEA: Cannes, FR
Facility:	US: Moscone Center EMEA: Palais des Festivals et des Congrès
Attendance:	US: 12,500 EMEA: 5,300
Marketing Tagline:	"Hello Freedom"
Band:	US: Foreigner EMEA: N/A
Media:	Backpack Presentation Template Show Graphics

2008
Date:	US: September 15–18, 2008 EMEA: February 26–28, 2008
City:	US: Las Vegas, NV EMEA: Cannes, FR
Facility:	US: Sands Convention Center EMEA: Palais des Festivals et des Congrès
Attendance:	US: 14,000 EMEA: 4,500
Marketing Tagline:	"Virtually Anything is Possible"
Band:	US: Tainted Love (cover band) EMEA: N/A
Media:	Backpack Presentation Template Show Graphics

2007
Date:	September 10–13, 2007
City:	San Francisco, CA
Facility:	Moscone Center
Attendance:	10,800
Marketing Tagline:	"Embracing Your Virtual World"
Band:	Smash Mouth
Media:	Backpack Presentation Template Show Graphics

2006
Date:	November 7–9, 2006
City:	Los Angeles, CA
Facility:	Los Angeles Convention Center
Attendance:	6,700
Marketing Tagline:	N/A
Media:	Backpack Presentation Template Show Graphics

2005
Date:	August 31-September 3, 2005
City:	Las Vegas, NV
Facility:	Mandalay Bay Convention Center
Attendance:	3,500
Marketing Tagline:	"Virtualize Now"
Media:	Backpack Presentation Template Show Graphics

2004
Date:	November 17–20, 2004
City:	San Diego, CA
Facility:	Hyatt Convention Center
Attendance:	1,500
Marketing Tagline:	“Join the Virtual Evolution”
Media:	Backpack Presentation Template Show Graphics
