= AirWatch =

Enterprise mobility management software company, acquired by VMware in 2014

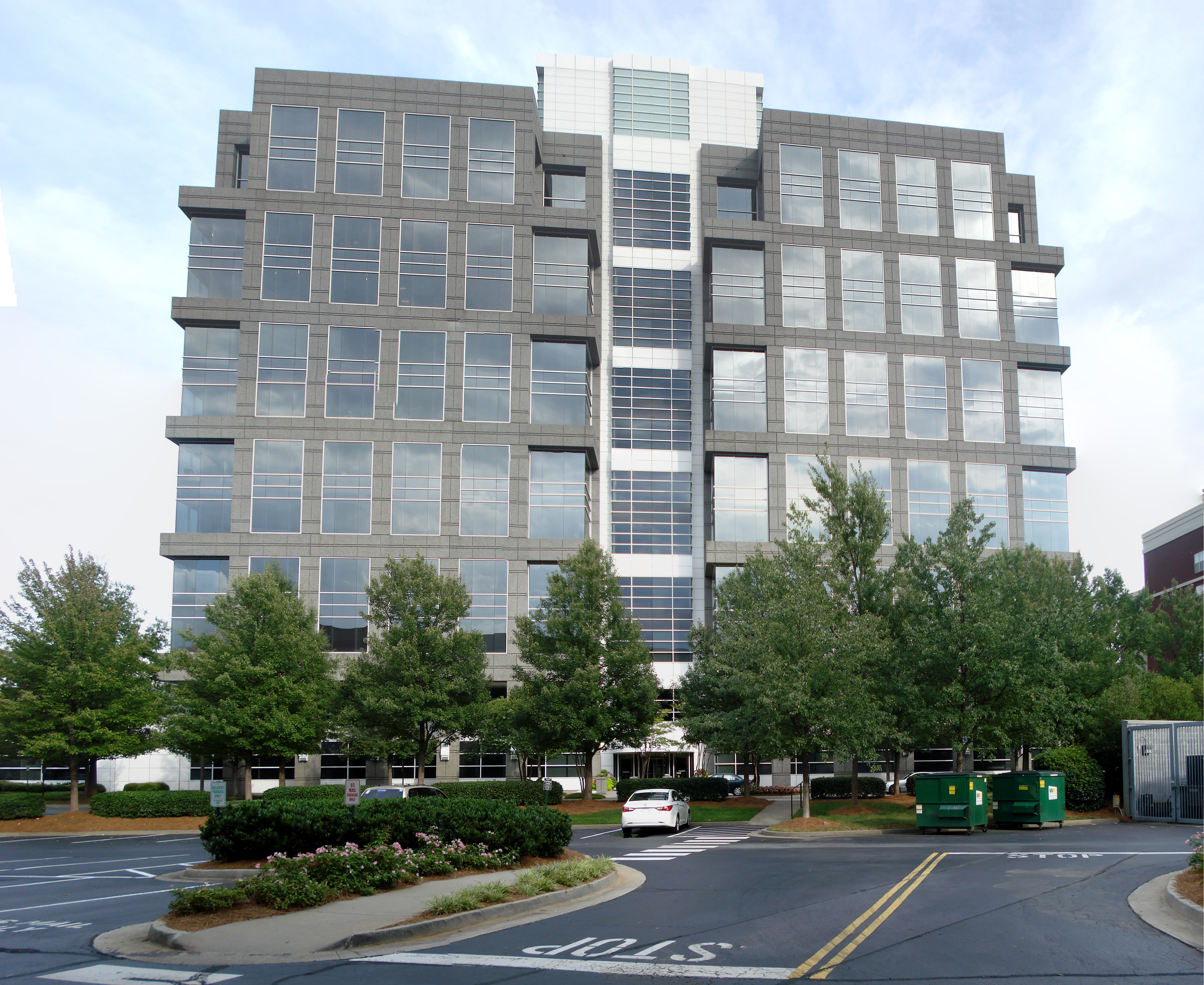
- Headquarters in Sandy Springs, Georgia
- Formerly: Wandering WiFi
- Traded as: VMW
- Industry: Enterprise mobility management software
- Founded: 2003 in Atlanta, Georgia, US
- Founder: John Marshall
- Fate: Acquired by VMware, Inc.
- Headquarters: Atlanta, Georgia, US
- Key people: Alan Dabbiere, John Marshall
- Products: AirWatch
- Brands: AirWatch, AirWatch by VMware, VMware AirWatch, Wandering WiFi
- Parent: VMware
- Website: www.airwatch.com

AirWatch was an Atlanta-based provider of enterprise mobility management (EMM) software. VMware acquired AirWatch in 2014 and rebranded the product as Workspace ONE Unified Endpoint Management (UEM) in 2018. After Broadcom acquired VMware in 2023, the End-User Computing division was sold to KKR and rebranded as Omnissa in 2024, which now develops Workspace ONE UEM.

== History ==
AirWatch was founded in 2003 as Wandering WiFi by John Marshall, who served as president and CEO. Alan Dabbiere has been the chairman since 2006. In February 2013, AirWatch received its first round of funding from Insight Venture Partners and Accel. In July 2013, the company acquired Motorola Solutions's MSP (Mobility Services Platform) seeking to extend its portfolio to ruggedized devices.

On February 24, 2014, the company was acquired by VMware, Inc for 1.5 billion, and the EMM product eventually was rebranded as AirWatch by VMware and then VMware AirWatch. In May 2018 the enterprise product was rebranded to Workspace ONE Unified Endpoint Management with the release of version 9.4. The product continued to sometimes be referred to as VMware Workspace ONE UEM powered by AirWatch.

AirWatch UK Limited was dissolved on 24 April 2018 with the company's final absorption into VMware as a business unit rather than a wholly owned entity.
