= Agile Lab =

Italian data and AI solutions provider

- Type: Private
- Industry: Software Development/Data Engineering
- Founded: 2013
- Founder: Alberto Firpo (CEO) and Paolo Platter (CTO)
- Headquarters: Milan, Italy
- Owner: Poste Italiane
- Website: www.agilelab.it

Agile Lab is a Europe-based data and AI solutions provider company, focused on data-intensive environments and across diverse data practices.

== History ==
Agile Lab was founded by Paolo Platter and Alberto Firpo in Turin in 2013. In 2015, the company started creating Witboost, Agile Lab's platform (formerly WASP). In 2018, Agile Lab started working within the Data Mesh environment—a sociotechnical approach to data management. The company garnered success in the IoT category at the 2019 Digital360 Awards. In 2020, the company started providing Big Data Analysis and DevOps services for the implementation of the Italian National Digital Data Platform. In 2021 and 2022, Agile Lab won awards as Europe's Fastest Growing Company and was also named a Champion of Growth in both 2022 and 2023.

In October 2022, Poste Italiane became the majority partner of the Agile Lab group by acquiring a 70% stake in the company, in exchange for approximately 18 million euros. The founding partners, Alberto Firpo and Paolo Platter, retain the roles of Chief Executive Officer and Chief Technology Officer, respectively, while holding the remaining 30% of the capital.

Simultaneously, Agile Lab launched the Data Mesh Italia Meetup, the first community in Italy dedicated entirely to the Data Mesh paradigm.

In the same year, Agile Lab became a member of IFAB International Foundation, an independent platform for the scientific and cultural discourse on global human development, sustainability, and emerging sciences.

In June, at the CIO/CISO Dach Summit in Frankfurt, Agile Lab launched next-generation Witboost 1.0, with a strong focus on Data Governance.

In September, at Big Data London 2023, the company released an open-source Witboost's platform Starter Kit.

Before the year's end, Agile Lab also received recognition as the South EMEA Partner of the Year from Cloudera, and it was recognized among the Top 10 Data Governance Solution Providers by GRC Outlook.
