= Digital Consulting Institute =

Digital Consulting Institute (DCI) was a seminar company launched in 1982 by George Schussel and his wife Sandi from their home in Massachusetts. It evolved out of a series of database seminars taught by Schussel in the 1970s.

== Early development ==
In the early 1980s the United States was coming out of a steep recession, and the DCI grew quickly as demand for improved knowledge about the use of information technology (IT) soared. Experts in other IT fields were drawn to DCI as a way to spread knowledge about the IT discipline.

== Success ==
DCI's business model underwent two significant paradigm shifts in the two decades following its inception. In the late 1980s, the company began to launch larger multi-speaker conferences. Then, around 1990, DCI began to serve a larger constituency by sponsoring trade show expositions as well as educational events. This expansion of DCI's model was responsible for dramatic growth experienced in the 1990s.

In 1990, the company moved into the historic Ballardvale Mill (1835) in Andover, Massachusetts. At the mill, DCI experienced good fortune as the company's revenues grew from $12 million to $45 million during the 1990s. DCI produced an average of 120 seminar, conference, and exposition events a year. The majority were held in the United States, but the company also had a significant presence in Canada, Germany, and Australia. It held a smaller number of events around the world in mostly European and Asian venues.

DCI was a leader in creating and producing high-technology conferences and tradeshows. Most of the company's events were about the management of computer-based systems for improved business efficiency. The company's events were market leaders in the fields of database management systems (DBMS), eBusiness, application development, sales force automation (SFA), data warehouse, and customer relationship management (CRM) areas. DCI produced approximately 120 conferences, seminars, and expositions annually.

As the 1990s wore on, the Internet became of ever-increasing importance in communicating with IT professionals. DCI evolved a product line of online communities and web sessions for business professionals to serve this need.

DCI's products served on the order of 200,000 business professionals annually from a customer database of over one million. The events were highly regarded for their content, educational focus, and ability to draw important industry exhibitors and qualified speakers. DCI events consistently drew real users and companies that needed to purchase software solutions, and, for that reason, the events were popular with the software vendor community.

Examples of conferences and expositions run by DCI included:

- Business Intelligence World Conference & Expo
- CASE World
- Client/Server World
- Corporate Portals Conference
- Customer Relationship Management Conference & Exposition
- Database World
- Downsizing Expo
- eB2B World
- eCRM University
- eCustomer Conference & Exposition
- Information Architecture Conference & Expo
- Internet Expo
- Managing Enterprise Networks and Systems
- Microsoft TechNet Symposium
- National Software Re-engineering Conference
- OSF/DCE Developer's Conference
- Summit on Wireless Computing
- Sybase User Group Annual Conference
- The Enterprise Architecture Conference
- The IT Outsourcing Conference

== Recognition ==
Supporting DCI's effort each year were many key IT industry professionals who participated as speakers at events. Just a few of the industry celebrities who keynoted DCI included: Fran Tarkenton, Ed Yourdon, Charles Wang, John Cullinane, Larry Ellison, Marc Benioff, Chris Date, Edgar Codd, Steve Jobs, and Dave Duffield. DCI had STARS, an internally developed speaker database that contained the names of about 4,000 speaker/consultants who regularly spoke at DCI events. In addition to book authors, independent consultants and experts, many of the company's presenters came from industry leaders as IBM, Microsoft, Computer Associates, Compaq, Hewlett Packard, Oracle, Siebel, Salesforce, and Sybase. Because of its reputation, DCI was frequently able to get leading industry companies to provide financial support for new DCI programs.

== Closing of operations ==
DCI's operations wound down in the early 2000s after its founder, George Schussel, and former president, Ron Gomes had retired from the business. The precipitous decline of the NASDAQ market in 2000 was the first indicator that DCI's business model had peaked. More users sought to obtain information from the Internet instead of DCI's conferences as the first decade in the 21st century began. In addition, after the 9/11/2001 World Trade disaster, people immediately drastically reduced their travel to conferences. At its peak, the company had employed 180 staff, although the typical employment total in the 1990s was around 120. In July 2004, DCI ceased operations as the final group of employees were relocated into new positions with successor firm, SharedInsights.

DCI's operations were negatively impacted by tax evasion charges that lead to the conviction of its two most senior executives.

From 1992 through 1996, DCI diverted over $8 million of its gross receipts to Digital Consulting International, Ltd. (DCIL), a corporation set up in Bermuda, for the purpose of evading the payment of taxes on that income.
