= VMware =

American cloud computing and virtualization company

Coordinates: 37.4021124°N 122.1445973°W

VMware LLC

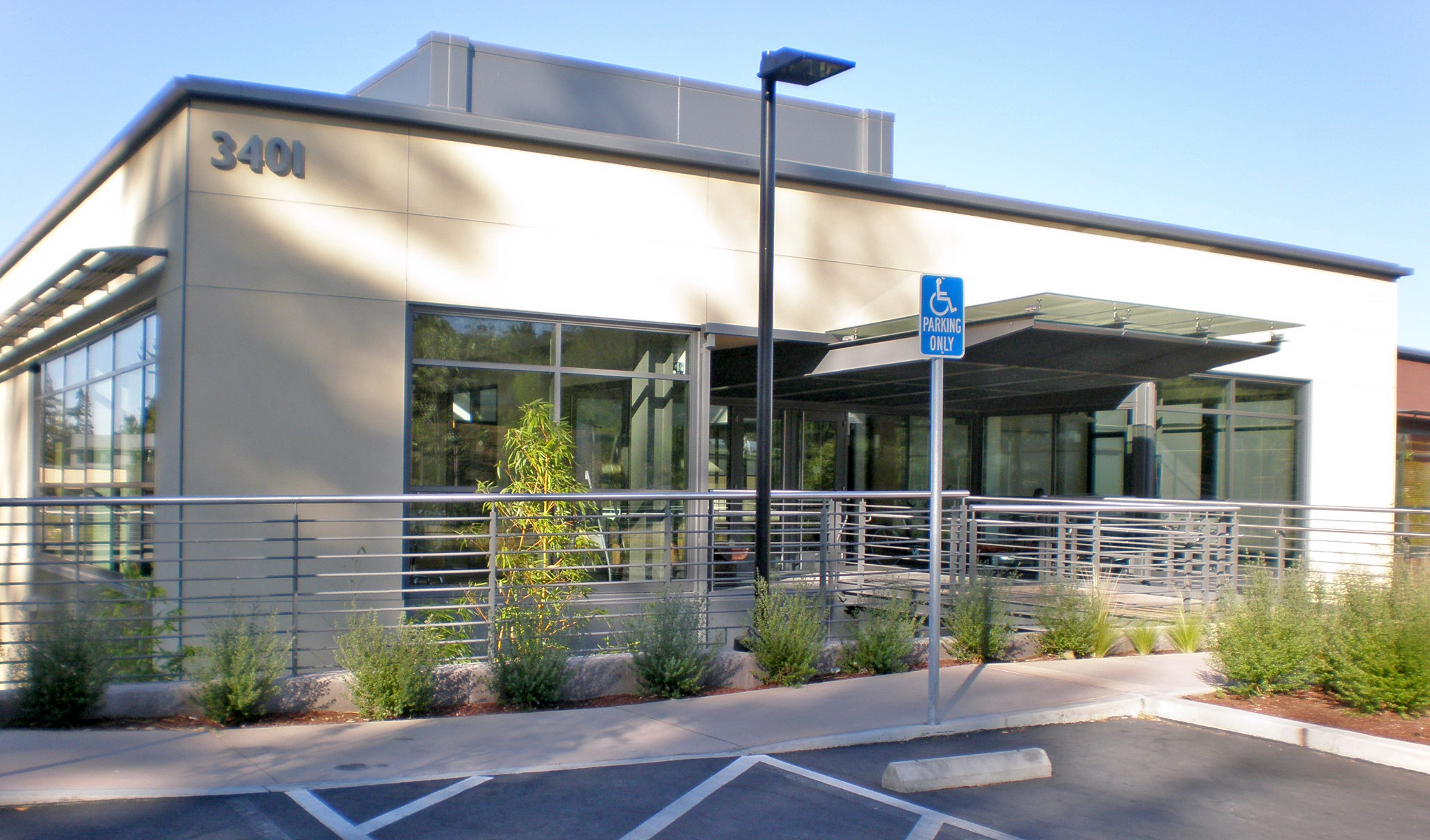
- Entrance to campus headquarters, Palo Alto, California
- Formerly: VMware, Inc. (1998–2023)
- Type: Subsidiary
- Traded as: NYSE: VMW (2007–2023)
- Industry: Cloud computing; Virtualization; Computer software
- Founded: February 10, 1998; 28 years ago Palo Alto, California, U.S.
- Founders: Mendel Rosenblum; Diane Greene; Scott Devine; Ellen Wang; Edouard Bugnion
- Headquarters: Stanford Research Park; Palo Alto, California, U.S.
- Key people: Raghu Raghuram (CEO)
- Products: ESXi; Fusion; Horizon; Infrastructure; Player; ThinApp; vSphere
- Revenue: ▲US$13.4 billion (2023)
- Operating income: ▼US$2.0 billion (2023)
- Net income: ▼US$1.3 billion (2023)
- Total assets: ▲US$31.2 billion (2023)
- Total equity: ▲US$1.5 billion (2023)
- Number of employees: 38,300 (2023)
- Parent: Broadcom
- Website: vmware.com
- Footnotes; Financials as of February 3, 2023

VMware LLC is an American cloud computing and virtualization technology company headquartered in Palo Alto, California. On November 22, 2023, Broadcom acquired VMware in a cash-and-stock transaction valued at $69 billion, with the end-user computing division of VMware then sold to KKR and rebranded to Omnissa. VMware was the first commercially successful company to virtualize the x86 architecture.

VMware's desktop software runs on Microsoft Windows, Linux, and macOS. VMware ESXi, its enterprise software hypervisor, is an operating system that runs on server hardware.

== History ==
Original logo from 1998 to 2009

=== Early history ===
==== Technical background ====
Virtualizing the x86 architecture was widely considered impractical in the late 1990s. Unlike the IBM System/370 mainframe architecture, which had supported virtualization since the 1960s, the x86 instruction set contained seventeen instructions that did not meet the Popek and Goldberg requirements for classical virtualization, behaving differently in privileged and unprivileged modes without generating traps that a virtual machine monitor could intercept.

VMware's technical approach grew out of the Disco research project at Stanford University, led by Mendel Rosenblum, which had virtualized the MIPS architecture for large ccNUMA multiprocessors in the mid-1990s. The founders' key insight was that x86 could be virtualized by combining direct execution of user-mode code with binary translation of kernel-mode code, dynamically rewriting problematic instructions at runtime.

==== Founding ====
VMware was founded in 1998 by Stanford computer science professor Mendel Rosenblum; his wife Diane Greene, who became the company's CEO and had previously led several technology startups; Rosenblum's Stanford graduate students Edouard Bugnion and Scott Devine; and Edward Wang, an associate of Greene's from the University of California, Berkeley. (Note: Wang's first name is given as "Edward" in the International Directory of Company Histories and in the 2012 ACM paper co-authored by Wang himself, but is frequently reported as "Ellen" in other sources.) According to Greene, early fundraising was difficult, as investors of the period were focused on consumer internet startups and did not understand the value of virtualization on commodity PC hardware. VMware operated in stealth mode for its first year, with roughly 20 employees by the end of 1998, and launched publicly at the DEMO conference in February 1999.

==== Early products and growth ====
Logo as of 2000

VMware's first product, VMware Workstation, was released in May 1999 and was marketed primarily to software developers and quality-assurance engineers, who used it to run multiple operating systems simultaneously on a single desktop computer for development and testing.

In 2001, VMware entered the server market with two products: the hosted VMware GSX Server, which ran on top of a conventional operating system, and VMware ESX Server, a "bare-metal" hypervisor that ran directly on server hardware without an underlying host operating system. ESX addressed a widely recognized inefficiency in enterprise data centers of the period, where servers typically operated at low utilization rates because individual applications were deployed on dedicated physical hardware for isolation and administrative reasons. By consolidating multiple workloads onto a single physical host, ESX offered substantial reductions in hardware, power, cooling, and data-center floor space.

In 2003, VMware introduced VMware VirtualCenter for centralized management of ESX hosts, along with vMotion and Virtual Symmetric Multi-Processing (SMP). vMotion enabled the live migration of running virtual machines between physical hosts with no perceptible downtime, allowing administrators to perform hardware maintenance without interrupting services. 64-bit guest support was added in 2004.

=== Acquisition by EMC ===
On January 9, 2004, under the terms of the definitive agreement announced on December 15, 2003, EMC (now Dell EMC) acquired the company with US$625 million in cash. On August 14, 2007, EMC sold 15% of VMware to the public via an initial public offering. Shares were priced at US$29 per share and closed the day at US$51.

On July 8, 2008, after disappointing financial performance, the board of directors fired VMware co-founder, president and CEO Diane Greene, who was replaced by Paul Maritz, a 14-year Microsoft veteran who was heading EMC's cloud computing business unit. Greene had been CEO since the company's founding, ten years earlier. On September 10, 2008, Mendel Rosenblum, the company's co-founder, chief scientist, and the husband of Diane Greene, resigned.

On September 16, 2008, VMware announced a collaboration with Cisco Systems. One result was the Cisco Nexus 1000V, a distributed virtual software switch, an integrated option in the VMware infrastructure.

In April 2012, EMC transferred control of the Mozy backup service to VMware.

On April 12, 2011, VMware released an open-source platform-as-a-service system called Cloud Foundry, as well as a hosted version of the service. This supported application deployment for Java, Ruby on Rails, Sinatra, Node.js, and Scala, as well as database support for MySQL, MongoDB, Redis, PostgreSQL, and RabbitMQ.

In August 2012, Pat Gelsinger was appointed as the new CEO of VMware, coming over from EMC. Paul Maritz went over to EMC as Head of Strategy before moving on to lead the Pivotal spin-off.

In March 2013, VMware announced the corporate spin-off of Pivotal Software, with General Electric investing in the company. Most of VMware's application- and developer-oriented products, including Spring, tc Server, Cloud Foundry, RabbitMQ, GemFire, and SQLFire were transferred to this organization.

In May 2013, VMware launched its own IaaS service, vCloud Hybrid Service, at its new Palo Alto headquarters (vCloud Hybrid Service was rebranded vCloud Air and later sold to cloud provider OVH), announcing an early access program in a Las Vegas data center. The service is designed to function as an extension of its customer's existing vSphere installations, with full compatibility with existing virtual machines virtualized with VMware software and tightly integrated networking. The service is based on vCloud Director 5.1/vSphere 5.1.

In September 2013, at VMworld San Francisco, VMware announced the general availability of vCloud Hybrid Service and expansion to Sterling, Virginia, Santa Clara, California, Dallas, Texas, and a service beta in the UK. It announced the acquisition of Desktone in October 2013.

=== Acquisition by Dell ===
In January 2016, in anticipation of Dell's acquisition of EMC, VMware announced a restructuring to reduce about 800 positions, and some executives resigned. The entire development team behind VMware Workstation and Fusion was disbanded and all US developers were immediately fired. On April 24, 2016, maintenance release 12.1.1 was released. On September 8, 2016, VMware announced the release of Workstation 12.5 and Fusion 8.5 as a free upgrade supporting Windows 10 and Windows Server 2016.

In April 2016, VMware president and COO Carl Eschenbach left VMware to join Sequoia Capital, and Martin Casado, VMware's general manager for its Networking and Security business, left to join Andreessen Horowitz. Analysts commented that the cultures at Dell and EMC, and at EMC and VMware, are different, and said that they had heard that impending corporate cultural collisions and potentially radical product overlap pruning, would cause many EMC and VMware personnel to leave; VMware CEO Pat Gelsinger, following rumors, categorically denied that he would leave.

In August 2016 VMware introduced the VMware Cloud Provider website.

Mozy was transferred to Dell in 2016 after the merger of Dell and EMC.

In April 2017, according to Glassdoor, VMware was ranked 3rd on the list of highest paying companies in the United States.

In Q2 2017, VMware sold vCloud Air to French cloud service provider OVH.

On January 13, 2021, VMware announced that CEO Pat Gelsinger would be leaving to step in at Intel. Intel is where Gelsinger spent 30 years of his career and was Intel's first chief technology officer. CFO Zane Rowe became interim CEO while the board searched for a replacement.

=== Spinoff from Dell ===
On April 15, 2021, it was reported that Dell would spin off its remaining stake in VMware to shareholders and that the two companies would continue to operate without major changes for at least five years. The spinoff was completed on November 1, 2021. On May 12, 2021, VMware announced that Raghu Raghuram would take over as CEO.

In May 2022, VMware announced that the company had partnered with Formula One motor racing team, McLaren Racing.

=== Acquisition by Broadcom ===
On May 26, 2022, Broadcom announced its intention to acquire VMware for approximately $61 billion in cash and stock in addition to assuming $8 billion of VMware's net debt, and that Broadcom Software Group would rebrand and operate as VMware.

In November 2022, the UK's Competition and Markets Authority regulator announced it would investigate whether the acquisition would "result in a substantial lessening of competition within any market or markets in the United Kingdom for goods or services".

The transaction closed on November 22, 2023, after a prolonged delay in getting approval from the Chinese regulator on an additional condition that VMware's server software should maintain compatibility with third-party hardware and not require the use of Broadcom's hardware products. On completion, Broadcom reorganized the company into four divisions: VMware Cloud Foundation, Tanzu, Software-Defined Edge, and Application Networking and Security, and subsequently laid off over 2,800 employees. Broadcom also relocated its headquarters from North San Jose to VMware's headquarters campus in Palo Alto.

On December 13, 2023, VMware ended availability for perpetually licensed products such as vSphere and Cloud Foundation, moving exclusively to subscription-based offerings. The company stated that the change was planned prior to the Broadcom acquisition.

In February 2024 private equity firm KKR and Broadcom agreed for KKR to acquire Broadcom's End-User Computing (EUC) Division, formerly a division of VMware, for about $4 billion. The EUC division, renamed to Omnissa, includes the desktop and app virtualization product Omnissa Horizon (formerly VMware Horizon) and the device management suite Omnissa Workspace ONE (formerly VMware Workspace ONE).

In May 2024, VMware announced that VMware Workstation Pro and VMware Fusion Pro would be made free for personal use, with commercial use still requiring payment. In November 2024, VMware announced that commercial use would be free too.

=== Acquisitions ===
Announcement date	Company	Description	Ref(s).
October 2005	Asset Optimization Group	Specialized in capacity planning.	
June 2006	Akimbi Systems	Specialized in lab management.	
April 2007	Propero	London-based VDI provider.	
September 2007	Dunes Technologies	VMware acquired the Switzerland-based company for an undisclosed sum.	
October 2007	Sciant	VMware acquired the Bulgaria-based outsourcing company for an undisclosed sum.	
January 2, 2008	Foedus	VMware acquired the New Hampshire (U.S.) based professional services company for an undisclosed sum.	
July 2008	B-hive Networks	VMware acquired the Israel-based start-up for an undisclosed sum. Following the acquisition VMware opened an R&D center in Israel, based initially on B-Hive's facilities and team in Israel.	
October 2008	Trango Virtual Processors	Was a Grenoble-based ARM hypervisor developer.	
October 2008	Blue Lane Technologies	Virtual firewall. Was integrated into vCloud networking but ultimately replaced by the much broader NSX virtual networking capabilities.	
November 26, 2008	Tungsten Graphics	Core expertise in 3D graphics driver development.	
August 10, 2009	SpringSource	Inventors of Spring Java open source, the most popular enterprise Java app framework for building web apps and microservices. The acquisition expanded VMware's education services to include SpringSource University and its authorized training partners such as Spring People in India. Spring became part of the Pivotal Software spin-out, spin-in.	
January 12, 2010	Zimbra (software)	Open source email system looking to challenge Exchange et al. Acquired from Yahoo and (later sold in July 2013 to Telligent Systems).	
May 6, 2010	GemStone Systems	A highly scalable, distributed in-memory database. The Java product was included in the Pivotal spin-out and ultimately open sourced as Apache Geode. The Smalltalk product was bought by GemTalk Systems.	
Jan 2011	NeoAccel Inc	Incorporated into NSX.	
April 26, 2011	SlideRocket	A startup which developed a SaaS application for building business presentations that are stored online. Through a Web-based interface, users can handle all parts of the process, from designing slides and compiling content, to reviewing documents and publishing and delivering them. VMware subsequently sold SlideRocket to ClearSlide on March 5, 2013.	
May 31, 2011	Socialcast	"Like Facebook, but private and for your own employees". Enterprise Social Networking and Collaboration.	
August 2011	PacketMotion	User Activity Monitoring startup. Its PacketSentry product was planned to be incorporated into VMware vCloud Networking and Security but then it was discontinued by the end of 2012.	
May 22, 2012	Wanova		
July 2, 2012	DynamicOps	A cloud management system originally spun out of Credit Suisse. VMware rebranded products as vRealize Automation and vRealize Orchestrator, and ultimately incorporated into the vRealize Suite—now branded as VMware Aria Automation.	
July 23, 2012	Nicira	Software for network virtualization, rebranded as VMware NSX. Acquired for $1.2 billion. Nicira was founded in 2007 by Martin Casado, Nick McKeown and Scott Shenker.	
February 11, 2013	Virsto		
October 15, 2013	Desktone	Desktop-as-a-service provider	
January 22, 2014	AirWatch and Wandering WiFi	System for managing the security, audit and configuration of mobile devices in enterprises. Acquired for US$1.54 billion.	
March 6, 2014	ThirdSky	ITIL/ITSM Consulting.	
August 20, 2014	CloudVolumes (formerly SnapVolumes)	Real-time application delivery and virtualization to virtual desktop infrastructure	
October 29, 2014	Continuent	Database clustering and replication software	
October 2014	MomentumSI	Austin, Texas–based professional services firm specializing in cloud migration and DevOps expertise	
June 13, 2016	Arkin Net	vRealize Network Insight - Discover, Optimize and Troubleshoot App Security and Network Connectivity	
April 12, 2017	Wavefront	Cloud-based metrics and monitoring (now VMware Tanzu Wavefront Observability)	
May 15, 2017	Apteligent	Mobile application performance.	
December 12, 2017	VeloCloud Networks	Software-defined wide area network (SD-WAN).	
February 18, 2018	CloudCoreo	Cloud configuration-management	
February 22, 2018	CloudVelox	Hybrid cloud automation and orchestration software	
March 28, 2018	E8 Security	Software for protecting employee devices from online threats.	
May 14, 2018	Bracket Computing	Security virtualization technology.	
August 27, 2018	CloudHealth Technologies	Cloud cost, usage, security, and governance management platform.	
Nov 6, 2018	Heptio	Kubernetes Software and Services.	
February 2019	Aetherpal	Remote support capabilities for the Workspace ONE platform.	
May 15, 2019	BitRock	Cross platform installer creation tool.	
July 2019	Avi Networks	Cloud application services, including Load Balancer, WAF, and Service Mesh.	
July 18, 2019	Bitfusion	computing, artificial intelligence and machine learning.	
August 20, 2019	Intrinsic	application and serverless security.	
October 8, 2019	Carbon Black	Cloud-native endpoint security software that is designed to detect malicious behavior and to help prevent malicious files from attacking an organization.	
December 30, 2019	Pivotal Software	Cloud-native platform provider of digital transformation technology and services.	
July 31, 2020	Lastline	Cyber security and breach detection platform provider.	
September 29, 2020	SaltStack	Automation and configuration management software.	

=== Litigation ===
In March 2015, the Software Freedom Conservancy announced it was funding litigation by Christoph Hellwig in Hamburg, Germany against VMware for alleged violation of his copyrights in its ESXi product. Hellwig's core claim is that ESXi is a derivative work of the GPLv2-licensed Linux kernel 2.4, and therefore VMware is not in compliance with GPLv2 because it does not publish the source code to ESXi. VMware publicly stated that ESXi is not a derivative of the Linux kernel, denying Hellwig's core claim. VMware said it offered a way to use Linux device drivers with ESXi, and that code does use some Linux GPLv2-licensed code and so it had published the source, meeting GPLv2 requirements.

The lawsuit was dismissed by the court in July 2016 and Hellwig announced he would file an appeal. The appeal was decided February 2019 and again dismissed by German court, on the basis of not meeting "procedural requirements for the burden of proof of the plaintiff."

In May 2023, VMware was ordered to pay $84.5 million for patent infringement on two patents belonging to Densify, a Canadian software company.

In August 2024, AT&T filed a lawsuit alleging that Broadcom broke contract by refusing to provide a one-year renewal for perpetually licensed VMware software support and that it increased prices by 1,050%.

== Current products ==
VMware's most notable products are its hypervisors. VMware became well known for its first type 2 hypervisor known as VMware Workstation. This product has since evolved into two additional hypervisor product lines: VMware's type 1 hypervisors running directly on hardware (ESX/ESXi) and its discontinued hosted type 2 hypervisors (GSX).

VMware software provides a completely virtualized set of hardware to the guest operating system. VMware software virtualizes the hardware for a video adapter, a network adapter, and hard disk adapters. The host provides pass-through drivers for guest USB, serial, and parallel devices. In this way, VMware virtual machines become highly portable between computers, because every host looks nearly identical to the guest. In practice, a System administrator can pause operations on a virtual machine guest, move or copy that guest to another physical computer, and there resume execution exactly at the point of suspension. Alternatively, for enterprise servers, a feature called vMotion allows the migration of operational guest virtual machines between similar but separate hardware hosts sharing the same storage (or, with vMotion Storage, separate storage can be used, too). Each of these transitions is completely transparent to any users on the virtual machine at the time it is being migrated.

VMware's products predate the virtualization extensions to the x86 instruction set, and do not require virtualization-enabled processors. On newer processors, the hypervisor is now designed to take advantage of the extensions. However, unlike many other hypervisors, VMware still supports older processors. In such cases, it uses the CPU to run code directly whenever possible (as, for example, when running user-mode and virtual 8086 mode code on x86). When direct execution cannot operate, such as with kernel-level and real-mode code, VMware products use binary translation (BT) to re-write the code dynamically. The translated code gets stored in spare memory, typically at the end of the address space, which segmentation mechanisms can protect and make invisible. For these reasons, VMware operates dramatically faster than emulators, running at more than 80% of the speed that the virtual guest operating system would run directly on the same hardware. In one study VMware claims a slowdown over native ranging from 0–6 percent for the VMware ESX Server.

=== Desktop software ===
- VMware Workstation, introduced in 1999, was the first product launched by VMware. This software suite allows users to run multiple instances of x86 or x86-64-compatible operating systems on a single physical personal computer. Version 17.0 was released on November 17, 2022. Originally a commercial app, VMware Workstation has become freeware in December 2024.
- VMware Fusion provides similar functionality for users of the Intel Mac platform, the Apple Silicon platform built on ARM, along with full compatibility with virtual machines created by other VMware products. Originally a commercial app, VMware Fusion has become freeware in December 2024.

=== Server software ===
- VMware ESXi, an enterprise software product, can deliver greater performance than the freeware VMware Server, due to lower system computational overhead. VMware ESXi, as a "bare-metal" product, runs directly on the server hardware, allowing virtual servers to also use hardware more or less directly. In addition, VMware ESXi integrates into VMware vCenter, which offers extra services.

=== Cloud management software ===
- VMware vRealize Suite – a cloud management platform purpose-built for a hybrid cloud. VMware vRealize Hyperic was acquired from SpringSource and subsequently discontinued in 2020.
- VMware Go is a web-based service to guide users of any expertise level through the installation and configuration of VMware vSphere Hypervisor.
- VMware Cloud Foundation – Cloud Foundation provides an easy way to deploy and operate a private cloud on an integrated SDDC system.
- vSphere+ and vSAN+ – activates add-on hybrid cloud services for business-critical applications running on-premises, including IT disaster recovery and ransomware protection

==== Application management ====
- VMware Workspace Portal was a self-service app store for workspace management.
- Provisioning
  - PlateSpin (does Provisioning)

=== Storage and availability ===
VMware's storage and availability products are composed of two primary offerings:

- VMware vSAN (previously called VMware Virtual SAN) is software-defined storage that is embedded in VMware's ESXi hypervisor. The vSphere and vSAN software runs on industry-standard x86 servers to form a hyper-converged infrastructure (or HCI). However, network operators need to have servers from HCL (Hardware Compatibility List) to put one into production. The first release, version 5.5, was released in March 2014. The 6th generation, version 6.6, was released in April 2017. New features available in VMware vSAN 6.6 include native data at rest encryption, local protection for stretched clusters, analytics, and optimized solid-state drive performance. The VMWare 6.7 version was released in April 2018.
- VMware Site Recovery Manager (SRM) automates the failover and failback of virtual machines to and from a secondary site using policy-based management.

=== Networking and security products ===
- VMware NSX is VMware's network virtualization product marketed using the term software-defined data center (SDDC). The technology included some acquired from the 2012 purchase of Nicira. Software Defined Networking (SDN) allows the same policies that govern Identity and Access Management (IAM) to dictate levels of access to applications and data through a totally converged infrastructure not possible with legacy network and system access methods.

=== Other products ===
- The VIX (Virtual Infrastructure eXtension) API allows automated or scripted management of a computer virtualized using either VMware's vSphere, Workstation, Player, or Fusion products. VIX provides bindings for the programming languages C, Perl, Visual Basic, VBScript and C#.
- Herald is a communications protocol from VMware for more reliable Bluetooth communication and range finding for mobile devices. Herald code is available under an open-source license and was implemented in the Australian Government's COVIDSafe app for contact tracing on 19 December 2020.

== Former products ==
=== Desktop software ===
- VMware Workstation Player (discontinued) was freeware for non-commercial use, without requiring a license, and available for commercial use with permission. It is similar to VMware Workstation, with some features not available, including support for UEFI Secure Boot, snapshots, encrypted virtual machines, and some advanced features. While no longer available for purchase, it is still updated and bundled with the now-freeware VMware Workstation Pro.

=== Server software ===
- VMware Server was a free-of-charge product intended to use on a headless server. It is discontinued after the release of VMware Workstation 8.0.

=== Cloud management software ===
- VMware Horizon View was a virtual desktop infrastructure (VDI) product, but was part of the EUC division that was sold to KKR and renamed Omnissa.

=== Other products ===
- Workspace ONE UEM allows mobile users to access apps and data, but was part of the EUC division that was sold to KKR and renamed Omnissa.

== Incidents ==
Beginning in January 2022, hackers infiltrated servers using the Log4Shell vulnerability at organizations who failed to implement available patches released by VMware according to PCMag. ZDNET reported in March 2022 that hackers utilized Log4Shell on some customers' VMware servers to install backdoors and for cryptocurrency mining. In May 2022, Bleeping Computer reported that the Lazarus Group cybercrime group, which is possibly linked to North Korea, was actively using Log4Shell "to inject backdoors that fetch information-stealing payloads on VMware Horizon servers", including VMware Horizon.

CVE-2025-22230 is a vulnerability in VMWare Tools versions for Microsoft Windows. CVE-2025-22230 is an authentication-bypass vulnerability which, alongside other vulnerabilities, can permit a compromised virtual machine to perform virtual machine escape. CVE-2025-22230 has a CVSSv3 score of 7.8. Broadcom disclosed the vulnerability on March 25, 2025. The vulnerability was first disclosed by Positive Technologies.

== See also ==
- Comparison of platform virtualization software
- Hardware virtualization
- Hypervisor
- VMware VMFS
