= Broadgate Venus =

1989 sculpture in Broadgate, City of London

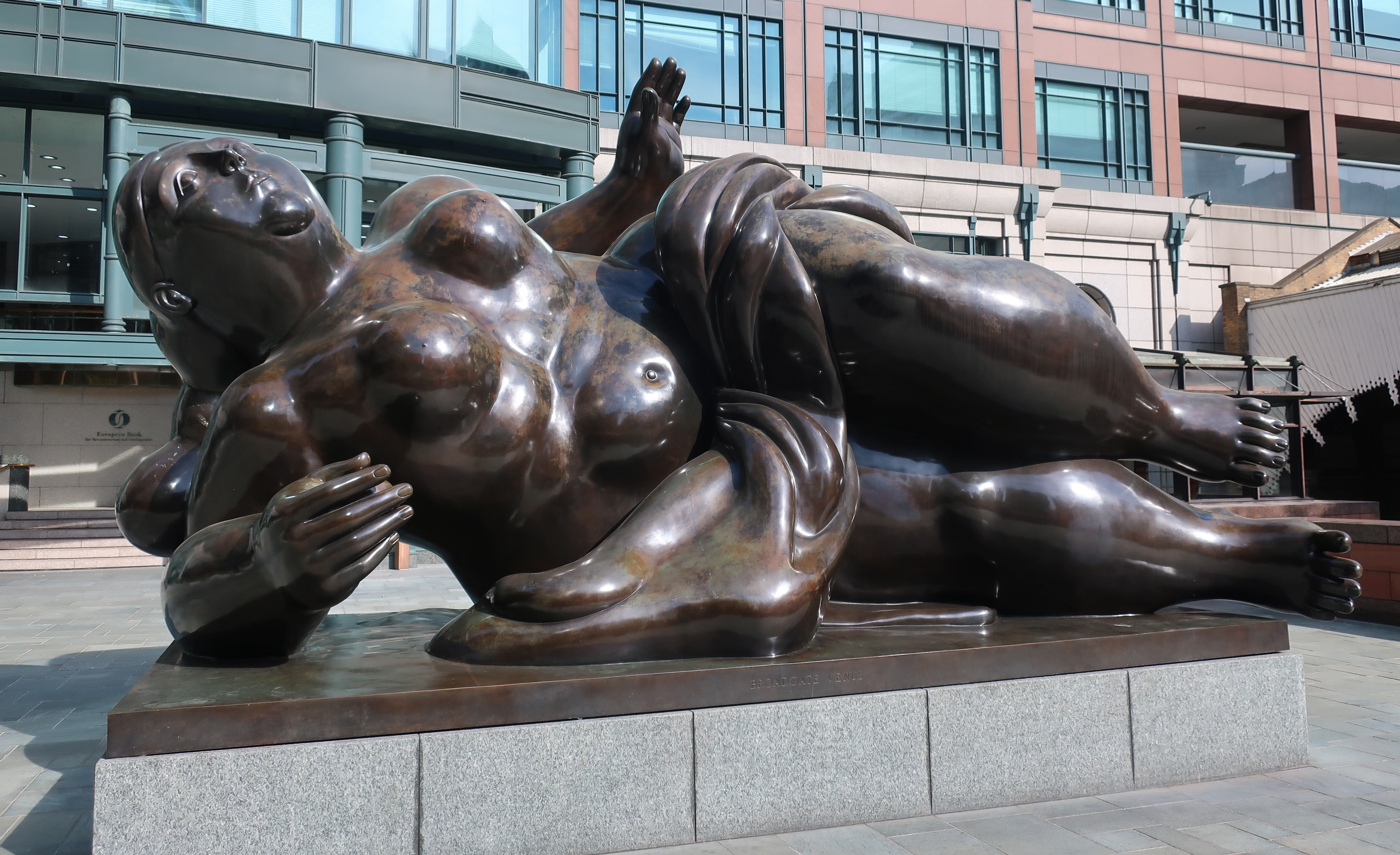
- Broadgate Venus in 2020
- Artist: Fernando Botero
- Year: 1989
- Medium: Bronze
- Subject: Venus
- Dimensions: 400 cm × 550 cm (160 in × 220 in); 350 cm diameter (140 in)
- Weight: 5 t (5.5 tons)
- Location: Exchange Square, Broadgate, City of London; 51°31′11″N 0°04′50″W
- Owner: British Land

Broadgate Venus is a 1989 bronze sculpture of Venus located in Exchange Square, Broadgate, City of London. Sculpted by Colombian artist Fernando Botero, the reclining figure is an example of Botero's style of oversized works called "Boterismo". It is one of several public artworks in the surrounding area, including Fulcrum by Richard Serra and Rush Hour by George Segal. Reviews of the sculpture have been positive, with writers noting the voluptuous proportions of the woman blend in with the surrounding large buildings. It has been included in lists of the "raciest" or "scandalous" artworks in the city.

== Description ==
Broadgate Venus is a 1989 bronze sculpture of a reclining Venus lying on her right side. She is naked except for a cloth covering a portion of her body. The proportions of the body are exaggerated and she is facing upwards, with her left hand also pointed up and her right hand holding a ball. Her right foot extends past the sculpture's bronze base. The figure measures 4 metres (13 ft) tall, 5.5 metres (18 ft) wide, and 3.5 metres (11 ft) in diameter. It weighs approximately 5 tonnes (5.5 tons). The inscriptions on the base are (front of base) BROADGATE VENUS, (south side of base) FONDERIA MARIANI PIETRASANTA ITALIA, and (south side of base) Botero 89. The sculpture is located in Exchange Square, a 5,000 m^{2} (54,000 sq ft) public square in the Broadgate district of the City of London, and above the Liverpool Street station. The sculpture and square are owned by British Land.

== History ==
The sculpture is by Fernando Botero, a Colombian painter and sculptor known for creating voluminous figures. He was one of the most prominent Latin American artists during his lifetime whose style of oversized works was called "Boterismo". Broadgate developers allowed Botero to select a site for his sculpture. It was installed in May 1990. Botero later created other versions of Broadgate Venus at various locations. In addition to Broadgate Venus, other public artworks in Exchange Square and the immediate area include Chromorama by David Batchelor, Rush Hour by George Segal, The Broad Family by Xavier Corberó, Eye-I by Bruce McLean, and Fulcrum by Richard Serra.

According to writer Hugh Pearman, the figure is "irresistibly reminiscent of a nude Queen Victoria" and noted its size was harmonious with the large buildings surrounding it. Journalist Will Noble described its appearance as a cross between Janet Webb and Alfred Hitchcock, and included Broadgate Venus on his list of the "raciest" statues in London, along with the Arthur Sullivan Memorial, Echo by Stephen Cox, the Wellington Monument, and the cast of David in the Victoria and Albert Museum. Alice Saville also included Broadgate Venus in a list of "scandalous" statues in London, along with Bulbous Betty by Edgar Allan Howes and A Sculpture for Mary Wollstonecraft by Maggi Hambling.

In her book Capital Culture: Gender at Work in the City of London, academic Linda McDowell described Broadgate Venus as "spectacular" and noted it was unlike so many figures in the city depicting smiling, virtuous women. She also said the figure "revels in her ample body" and was a "large and threatening personification of voluptuous, ripe womanhood".

== See also ==
- List of public art in the City of London
