= Rush Hour (sculpture) =

Sculpture in Broadgate, City of London

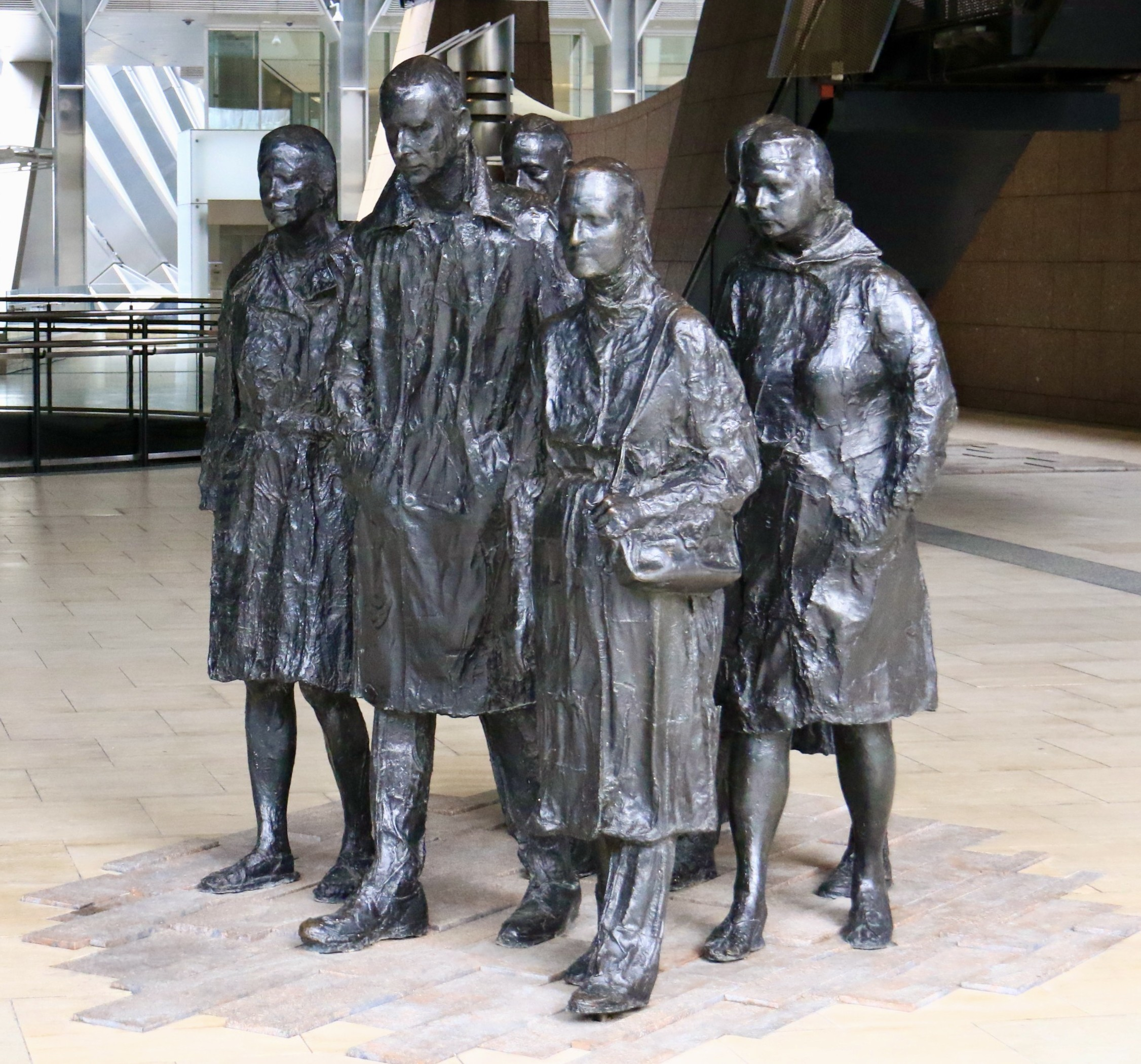
- Rush Hour in 2024
- Artist: George Segal
- Year: 1983
- Medium: Bronze
- Dimensions: 185 cm × 188 cm (73 in × 74 in); 170 cm diameter (67 in)
- Location: Exchange Square, Broadgate, City of London; 51°31′13″N 0°4′49″W

Rush Hour is a bronze group sculpture by American artist George Segal, from 1983. It is a depiction of workers walking during rush hour. Five casts were made at various dates, with several held in public collections. Perhaps the most famous cast (3/5) is now located in Exchange Square in Broadgate, City of London, United Kingdom. Rush Hour is one of many public artworks in the area depicting workers. It has been described as one of the best modern sculptures in London, but also "depressing" as the six people depicted are performing a mundane routine. The other casts are held by the Nasher Sculpture Center in Dallas, the Ho-Am Art Museum in Seoul, the Nelson-Atkins Museum of Art in Kansas City. and the Frederick R. Weisman Art Foundation in Los Angeles.

== Description of the London cast ==
Rush Hour is a bronze sculpture depicting six people quickly walking during rush hour. They are wearing raincoats, "each one seemingly isolated in their demeanour", with their eyes closed as they perform a daily routine. The sculpture measures 1.85 metres (6 ft 1 in) tall, 1.88 metres (6 ft 2 in) wide, and 1.7 metres (5 ft 7 in) in diameter. The inscription "RUSH HOUR / GEORGE SEGAL / 1983–87" is on the pavement slab beneath the sculpture. The people used as models for the sculpture were likely friends or family of the artist, George Segal, an American sculptor and painter associated with the pop art movement. To create the sculpture Segal performed his signature method of wrapping the models in plaster bandages before removing the hardened forms to create empty shells.

It is located on the Exchange House concourse of Exchange Square, a 5,000 m^{2} (54,000 sq ft) public square in the Broadgate district of the City of London. It was previously located on Finsbury Avenue Square, also in Broadgate. Other public artworks in Exchange Square and the immediate area include Broadgate Venus by Fernando Botero, Chromorama by David Batchelor, The Broad Family by Xavier Corberó, Eye-I by Bruce McLean, and Fulcrum by Richard Serra. A cast of the sculpture is on display at the Nelson-Atkins Museum of Art in Kansas City, Missouri, U.S.

== History of the London cast ==
Rush Hour was installed in October 1987 by property development companies Rosehaugh and Stanhope plc. It was the first of many public artworks installed in Broadgate, with Rush Hour being the closest to a traditional form of sculpture. In Segal's 2000 obituary, it was noted that the sculpture was his only one on public view in the United Kingdom. Beginning in 2014, Rush Hour was one of 35 sculptures in London and Manchester to be included in an interactive programme whereby visitors can scan a QR code and listen to audio recordings of stories related to each artwork. The story related to Rush Hour was recorded by comedian Clive Anderson.

Journalist and author Matt Brown of Londonist suggested the sculpture "neatly symbolises the daily drudge of the woebegone financial services professional" and included it in his list of the top nine modern sculptures in London, but also described it as "depressing" as they are on a "miserable march to work". In the scholarly journal The Social Studies, Thomas A Lucey and James D Laney wrote Rush Hour "serves as an allegory of the fate of the individual in modern society and as a tribute to the sacrifice of middle class workers". Art critic Benjamin Forgey of The Washington Post described the sculpture as an "eerie, ironic, contemporary replay" of The Burghers of Calais by Auguste Rodin, but noted the contrast between depicting heroes and tired workers.

Rush Hour is one of many public artworks throughout London depicting workers. Others include The Building Worker by Alan Wilson, The Cordwainer by Alma Boyes, The Spirit of Brotherhood (also known as The Spirit of Trade Unionism) by Bernard Meadows, Deal Porters by Philip Bews, Out in the Fields by Arthur G Atkinson, The Window Cleaner by Allan Sly, Landed (also known as Dockers) by Les Johnson and the National Firefighters Memorial by John Mills.

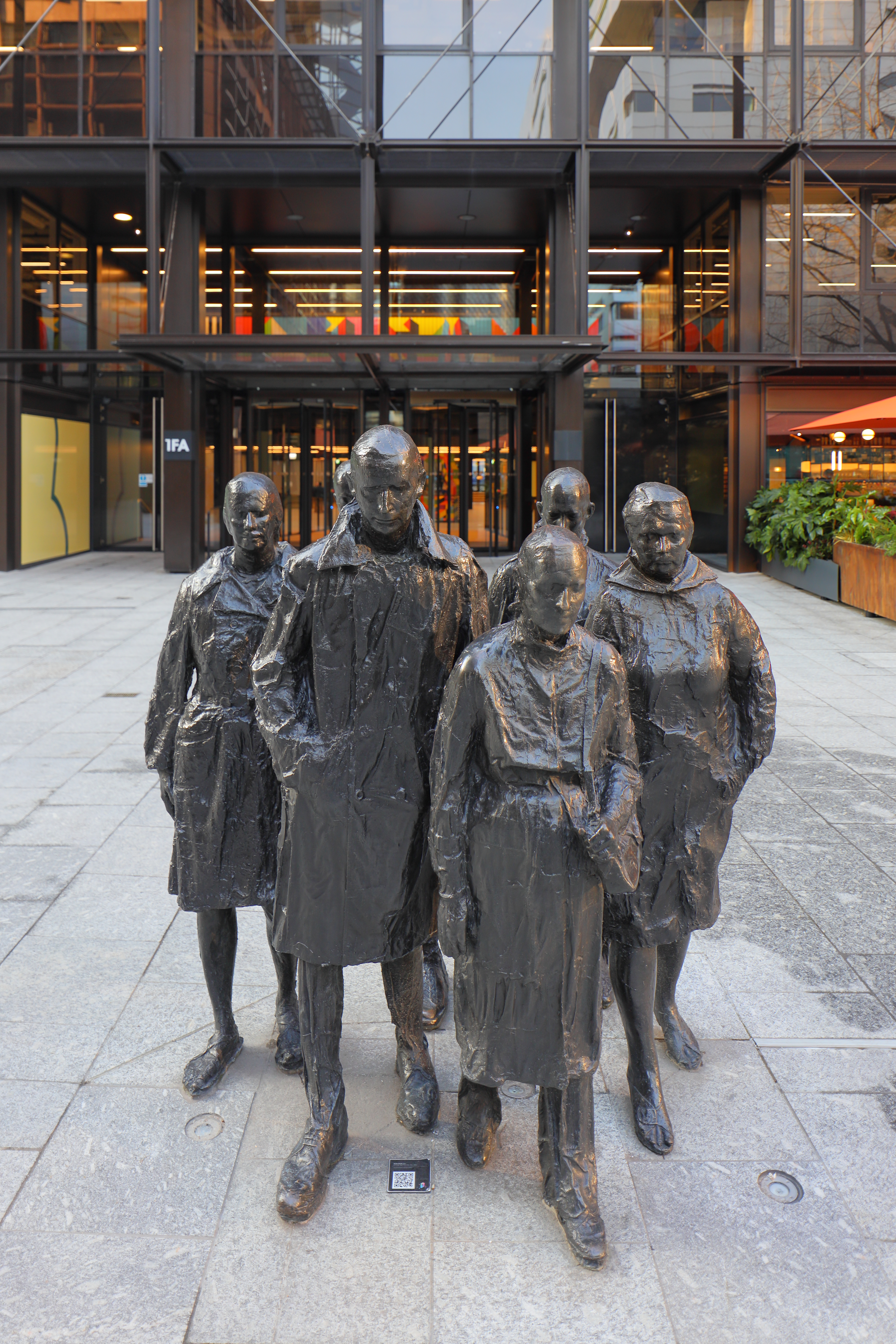
London cast at its former location in Finsbury Avenue Square

Nasher Sculpture Center, Dallas

== See also ==
- List of public art in the City of London § Broadgate
