= Odessa Wharf =

Coordinates: 51.4969°N 0.0332°W

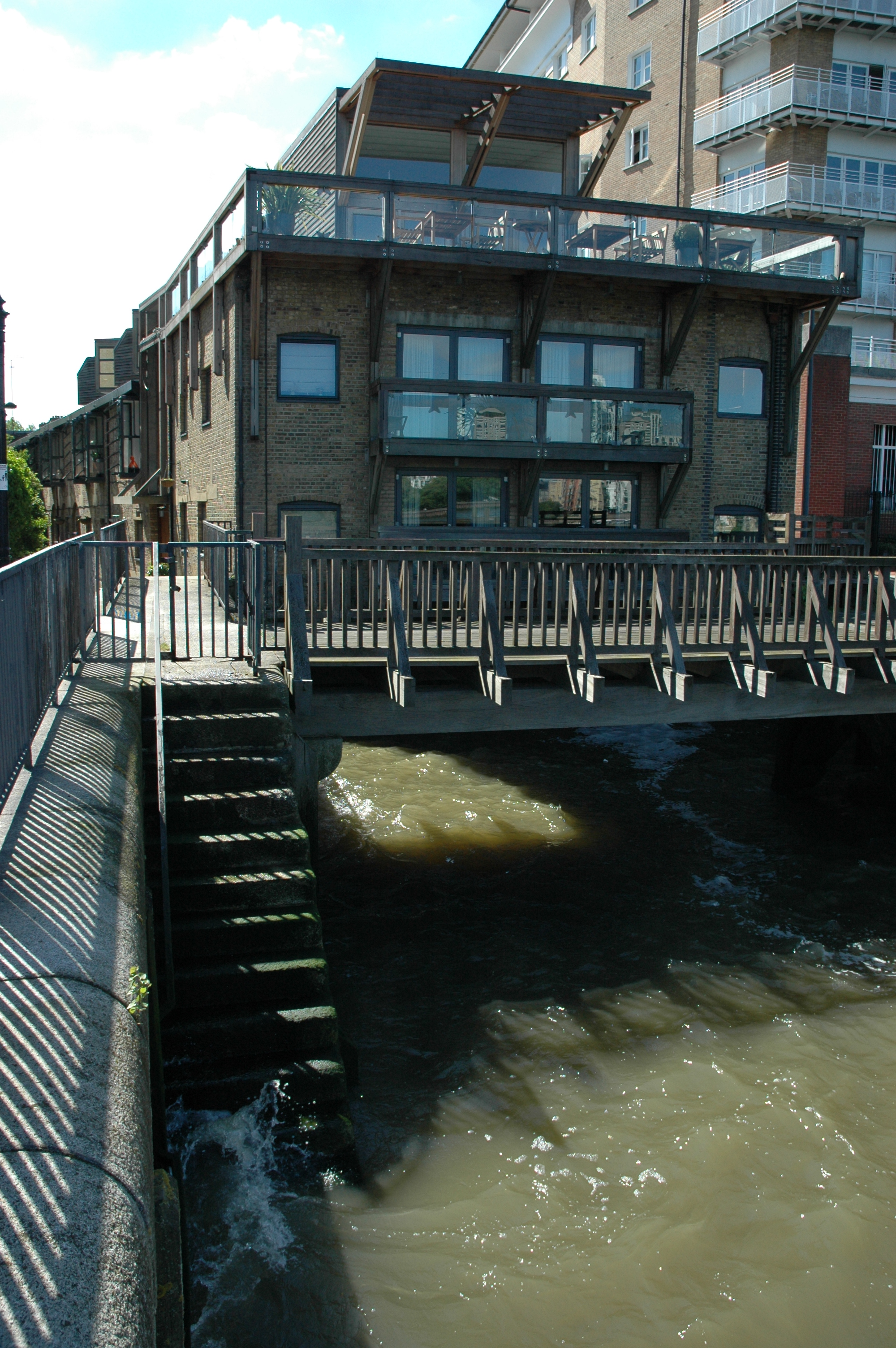
Odessa Wharf

Odessa Wharf is an early 19th-century warehouse located on the south bank of the River Thames at Rotherhithe, London. The warehouse has been converted into apartments and townhouses, some of which are operated as holiday lets by Odessa Club Management with the remainder as private residences. It is situated directly on the Thames Path national trail, north of Greenland Dock, with distinctive timber box "lanterns" on its roof.

== History ==
Seventeenth-century maps show that the site had been part of a shipyard from at least 1660 to the north of what is now Greenland Dock (formerly Howland Great Wet Dock). John Randall had taken a lease from the 4th Duke of Bedford in 1760, constructing Randall and Brent's yard alongside the Dock, where some of the largest East Indiamen and warships of the time were built in a private yard. By 1813, maps of the yard show a building in the present location of Odessa Wharf.

One of the original lintels at Odessa Wharf has been inscribed with the date 1810, which would make it one of the oldest surviving buildings on the Rotherhithe peninsula.

Views of the Howland Great Dock from the 18th Century show that adjacent to Odessa Wharf, on the opposite side of Randall's Rents, were a series of sawpits, some of which have structures which look like mould lofts, used to store the moulds for forming ships. The age, location, orientation to the pits and its long, thin building form suggest that this may well have been the original use of the building.

By 1868, Ordnance Survey maps indicate that the building had been incorporated into a large building, thought to be a granary, on the site now occupied by New Caledonian Wharf. By 1914 the form of the building plan, as shown on historic maps, had changed little, although it went through a series of name changes over time.

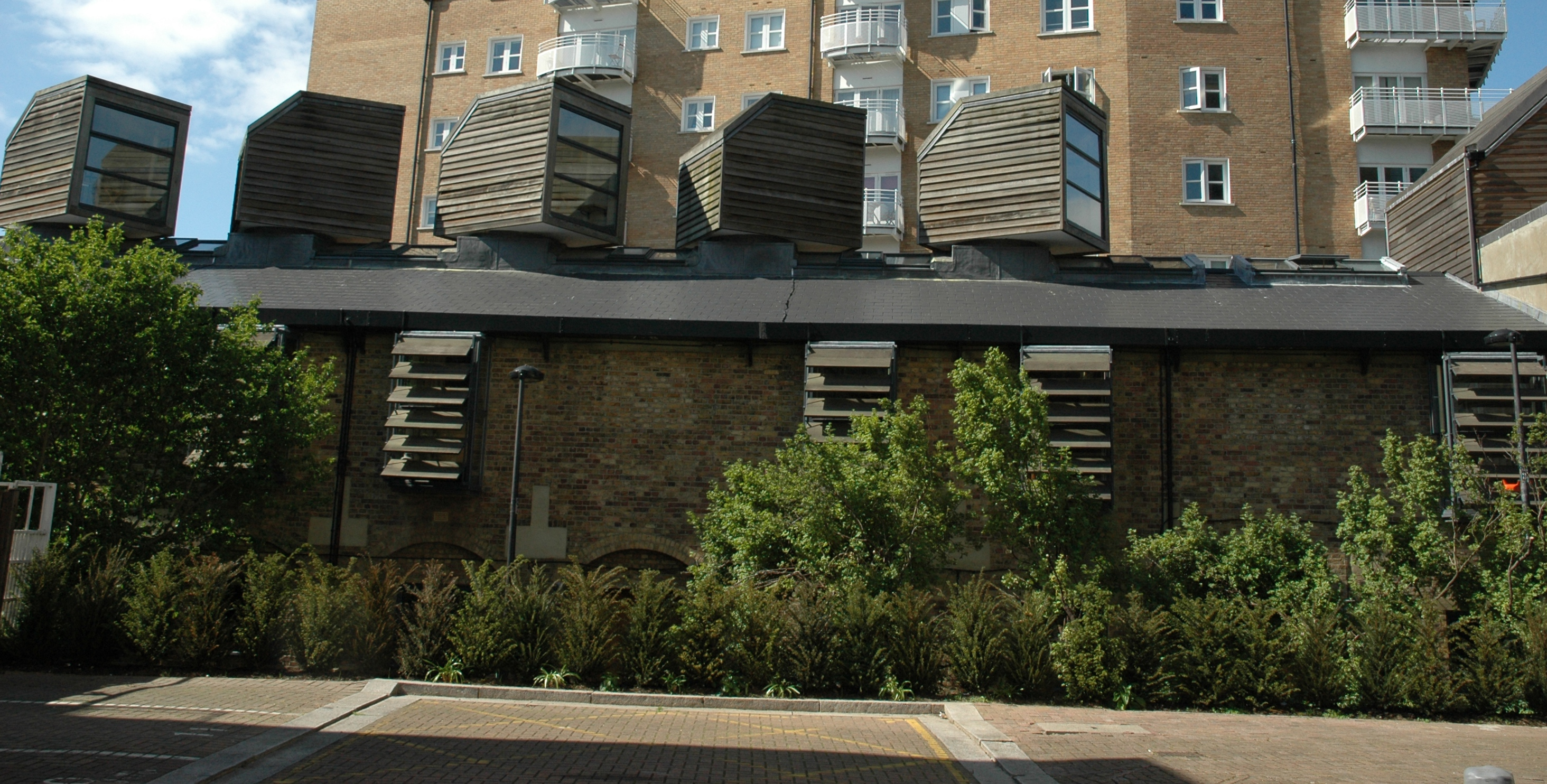
Odessa Wharf's distinct roof

Odessa Wharf was converted in 1999 by a Danish developer into design led luxury apartments, with a communal suite and river terrace at high level directly over the Thames looking towards Canary Wharf. The design by Fletcher Priest Architects and Torben Rix Arkitekt won a RIBA Housing Design Award in 2000.

The award judges commented that the conversion, "Shines out like a good deed in a generally naughty Thames-side world."

== Maps ==
- Southwark Historical maps website - Odessa Wharf - SE16 7LY
- Ordnance Survey 1868; London Sheet 78.1 – Odessa Wharf visible as part of a large granary on Thames Street Redriff Wharf
- Ordnance Survey 1894; – renamed Atkin's Wharf
- Ordnance Survey 1914; – described as Redriff Wharf; river profile largely as today
