= Bulbous Betty =

Sculpture in Richmond, London

Coordinates: 51.454078°N 0.300123°W

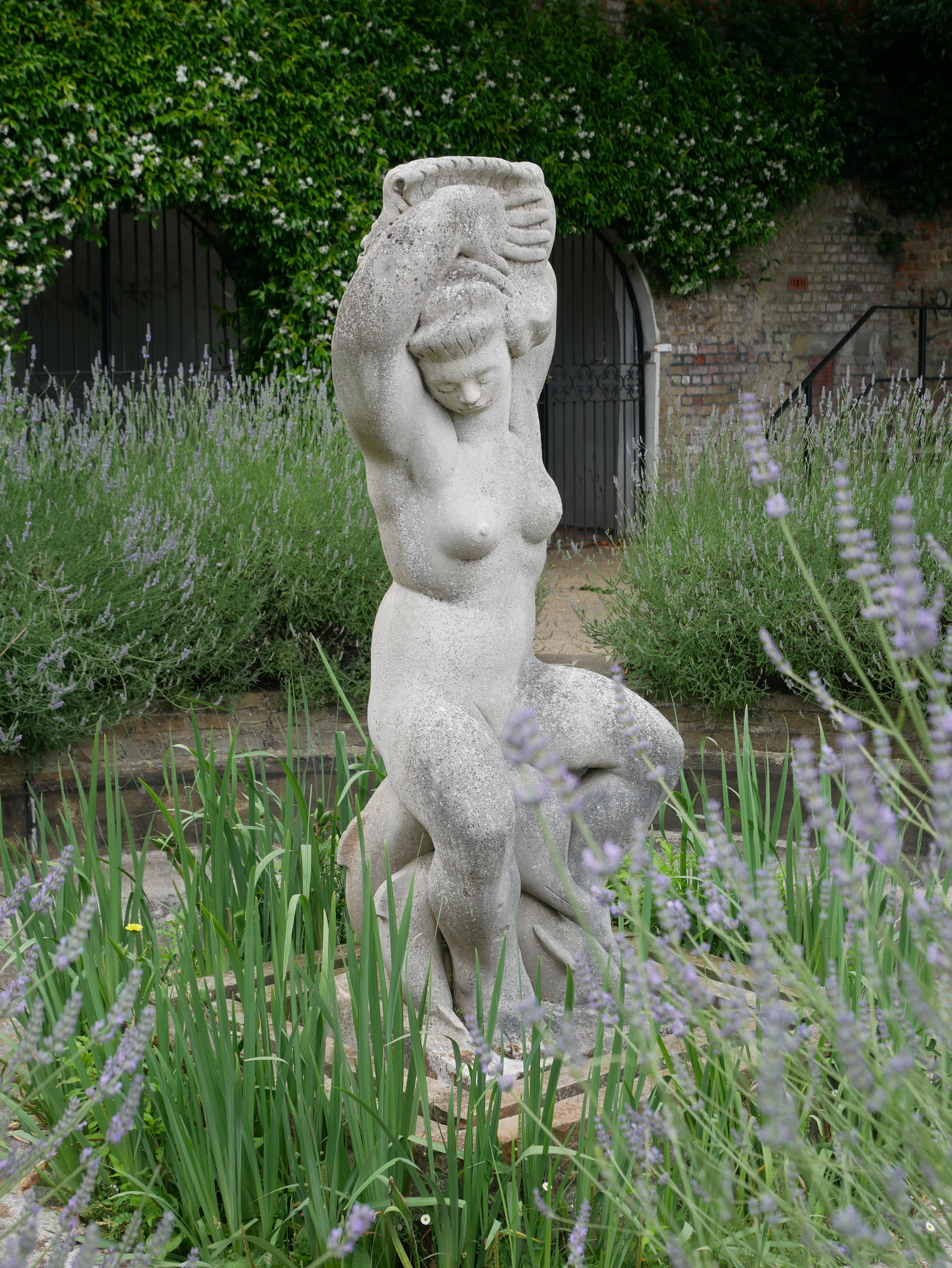
Bulbous Betty stands in Terrace Gardens on Richmond Hill.

Aphrodite, known locally as Bulbous Betty, is a statue of Aphrodite which stands in Terrace Gardens in Richmond Hill in London.

== Background ==
The statue is the work of Edgar Allan Howes. His parents moved to Richmond during his youth, and there he spent his early years and met his wife, who was born in the borough. The statue was initially exhibited at the Royal Academy in 1945, and was presented as a gift to the Borough of Richmond. The statue would be unveiled in Terrace Gardens in 1952, replacing a 19th-century cast-iron fountain.

The statue was included in a list of "scandalous" statues in London by Alice Saville, alongside the Broadgate Venus and A Sculpture for Mary Wollstonecraft. Saville suggests the statue caused a measure of controversy after its initial installation, and describes an episode in which the statue was painted to be wearing a swimsuit to conceal certain features.

== Description ==
The statue is a stylised nude of Aphrodite, the Ancient Greek goddess of love, with design elements such as waves and a dolphin suggesting water and the sea. The statue is sculpted from Portland stone.
