= Block Realty Building =

- U.S. National Register of Historic Places
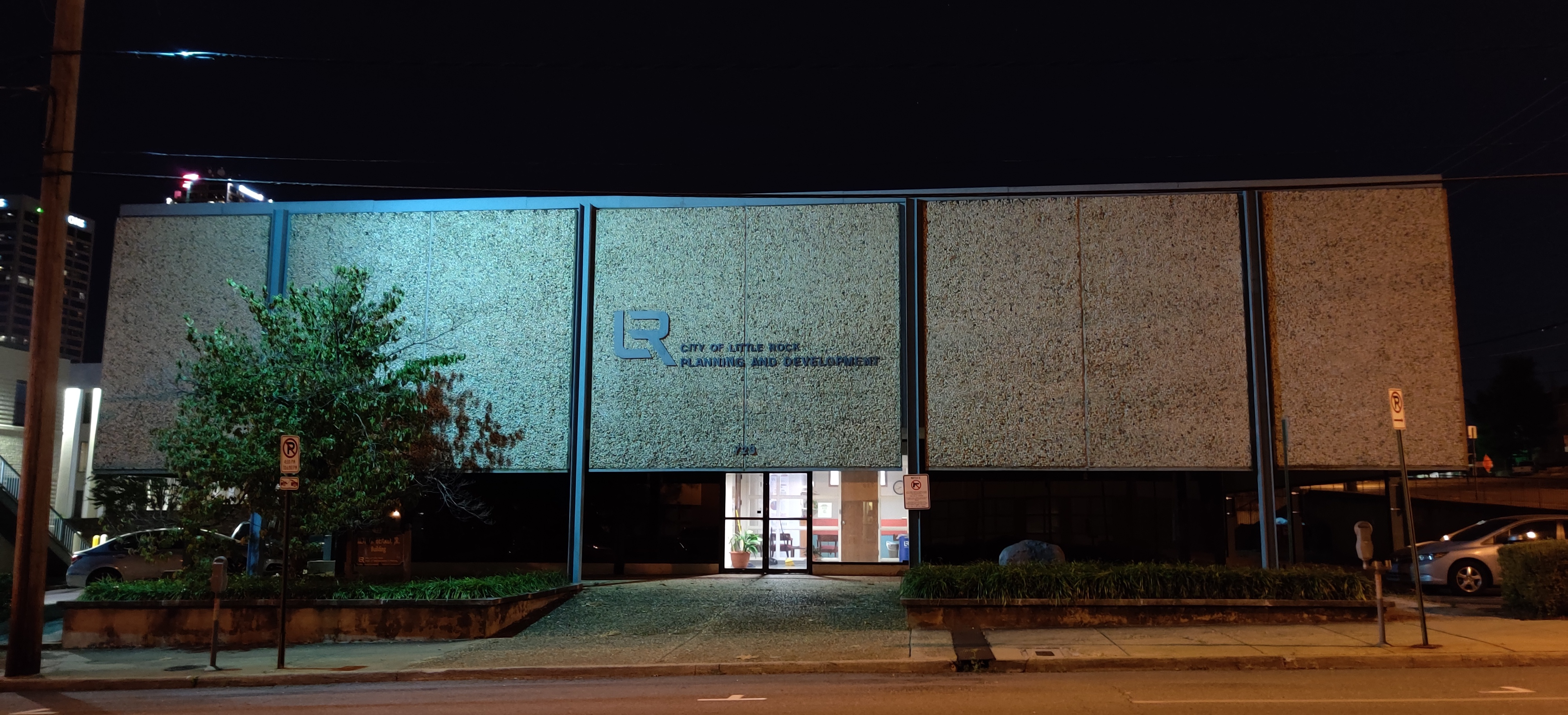
- The former Block Realty Building, as of 2019 a Little Rock municipal building

- Location within Arkansas Location within the United States
- Location: 723 W. Markham, Little Rock, Arkansas
- Coordinates: 34°44′57″N 92°16′42″W
- Area: less than one acre
- Built: 1964
- Architect: Gene Levy
- Architectural style: International
- NRHP reference No.: 100002950
- Added to NRHP: November 30, 2018

The Block Realty Building is a historic commercial building at 723 West Markham Street in Little Rock, Arkansas. It is a two-story structure, built out of steel and concrete, with a flat roof. It is supported by corten steel columns, with its first floor predominantly finished in glass, and the upper level in aggregate concrete tiles. It was built in 1964 to a design by architect-engineer Eugene Levy, and is a good local example of commercial Mid-Century Modern architecture.

The building was listed on the National Register of Historic Places in 2018.

== See also ==
- National Register of Historic Places listings in Little Rock, Arkansas
