= Weathering steel =

Steel whose surface rust inhibits further rusting

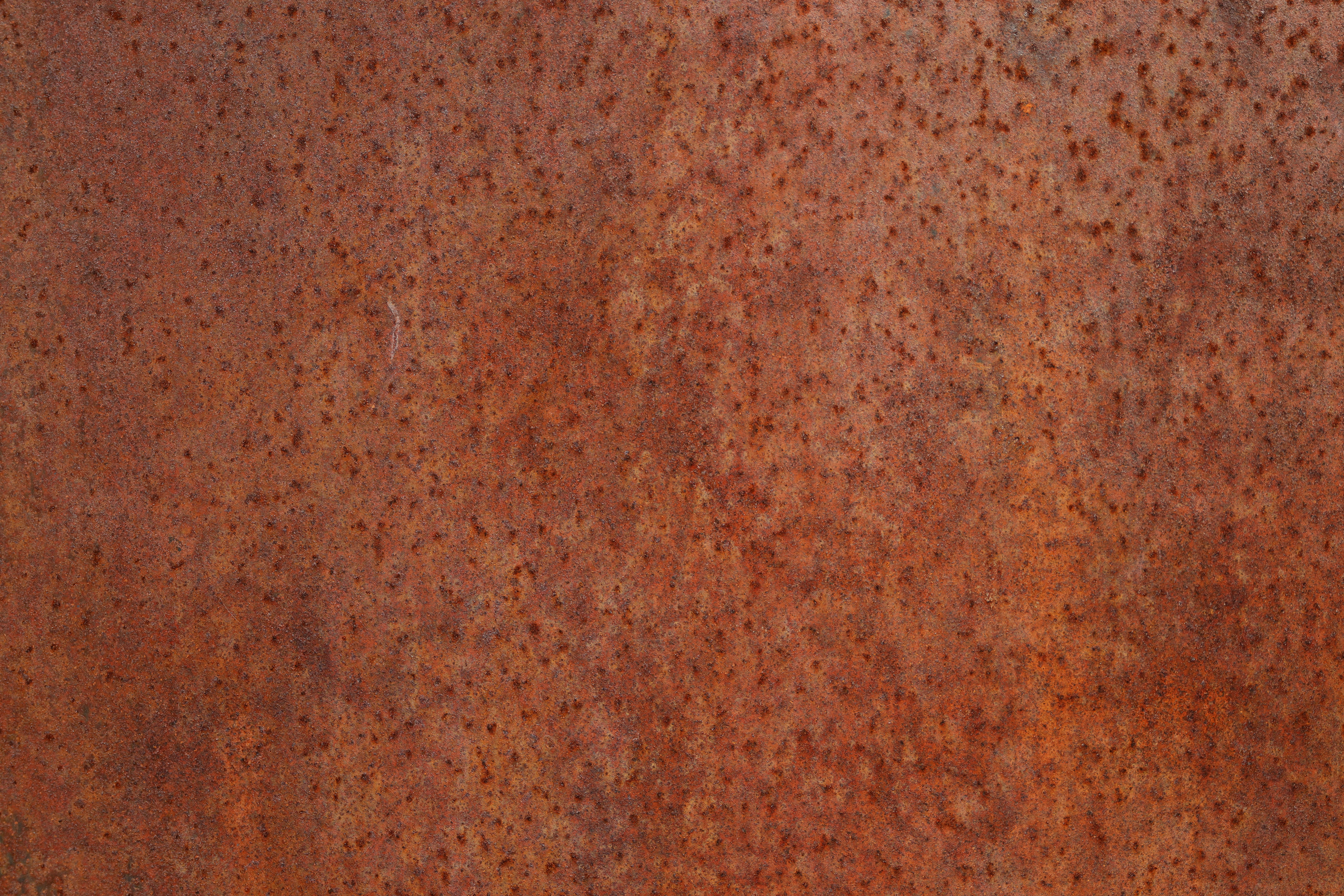
Texture of a sheet of Cor-Ten after being exposed to the elements for 5 years. The rust can form unevenly based on the composition of the metal.

Weathering steel, often called corten steel (or its trademarked name, COR-TEN) is a group of steel alloys that form a stable external layer of rust that eliminates the need for painting. It was first introduced in 1933 by U.S. Steel Corporation.

U.S. Steel (USS) held the registered trademark on the name COR-TEN until 2016. The name COR-TEN refers to the two distinguishing properties of this type of steel: corrosion resistance and tensile strength. Although USS sold its discrete plate business to International Steel Group (now ArcelorMittal) in 2003, it makes COR-TEN branded material in strip mill plate and sheet forms.

The original COR-TEN received the standard designation A242 (COR-TEN A) from the ASTM International standards group. Newer ASTM grades are A588 (COR-TEN B) and A606 for thin sheet. All of the alloys are in common production and use.

The surface oxidation generally takes six months to develop, although surface treatments can accelerate this to as little as one hour.

== History ==
The history of weathering steels began in the US in 1910s, when steels alloyed with different amounts of copper were exposed to the elements; the research continued into the 1920s and c. 1926 it was discovered that phosphorus content also helps with the corrosion resistance.

In 1933 the United States Steel Corporation decided to commercialize the results of their studies and patented a steel with exceptional mechanical resistance, primarily for use in railroad hopper cars, for the handling of heavy bulk loads including coal, metal ores, other mineral products and grain. The controlled corrosion for which this material is now best known was a welcome benefit discovered soon after, prompting USS to apply the trademarked name Cor-Ten. Because of its inherent toughness, this steel is still used extensively for bulk transport, intermodal shipping containers and bulk storage.

Railroad passenger cars were also being built with Cor-Ten, albeit painted, by Pullman-Standard for the Southern Pacific from 1936, continuing through commuter coaches for the Rock Island Line in 1949.

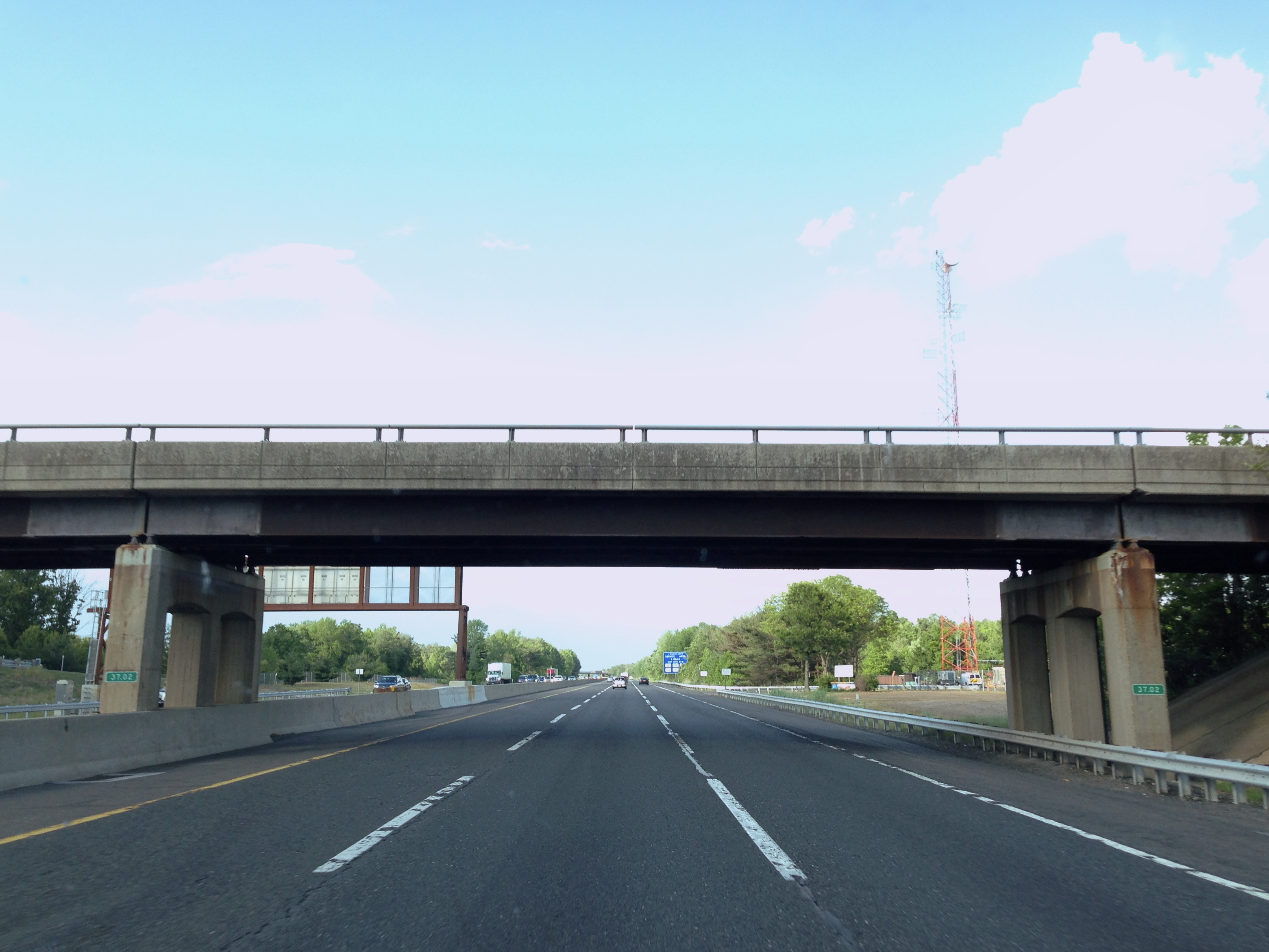
Moorestown Interchange over the New Jersey Turnpike in 2015

In 1964, the Moorestown Interchange was built over New Jersey Turnpike at milepost 37.02. This overpass is believed to be the first highway structure application of weathering steel. Other states including Iowa, Ohio, and Michigan followed soon after. Those were followed by University of York Footbridge in the United Kingdom in 1967. Since then, the practice of using weathering steel in bridges has expanded to many countries.

== Properties ==
Weathering refers to the chemical composition of these steels, allowing them to exhibit increased resistance to atmospheric corrosion compared to other steels. This is because the steel forms a protective layer on its surface under the influence of the weather.

The corrosion-retarding effect of the protective layer is produced by the particular distribution and concentration of alloying elements in it. It is not yet clear how exactly the patina formation differs from usual rusting, but it's established that drying of the wetted surface is necessary and that copper is the most important alloying element.

The layer protecting the surface develops and regenerates continuously when subjected to the influence of the weather. In other words, the steel is allowed to rust in order to form the protective coating.

Weathering steel grade chemical composition (excl. iron) by weight (%)
Grade	C	Si	Mn	P	S	Cr	Cu	V	Ni
ASTM A242	0.12	0.25–0.75	0.20–0.50	0.01–0.20	0.030	0.50–1.25	0.25–0.55		0.65
ASTM A588	0.16	0.30–0.50	0.80–1.25	0.030	0.030	0.40–0.65	0.25–0.40	0.02–0.10	0.40

The mechanical properties of weathering steels depend on which alloy and how thick the material is.

=== ASTM A242 ===
The original A242 alloy has a yield strength of 50 kilopounds per square inch (340 MPa) and ultimate tensile strength of 70 ksi (480 MPa) for light-medium rolled shapes and plates up to 0.75 inches (19 mm) thick. It has yield strength of 46 ksi (320 MPa) and ultimate strength of 67 ksi (460 MPa) for medium weight rolled shapes and plates 0.75–1 inch (19–25 mm) thick. The thickest rolled sections and plates – 1.5–4 in (38–102 mm) thick – have yield strength of 42 ksi (290 MPa) and ultimate strength of 63 ksi (430 MPa). ASTM A242 is available in Type 1 and Type 2. Both have different applications based on the thickness. Type 1 is often used in housing structures, construction industry and freight cars. The Type 2 steel, which is also called Corten B, is used primarily in urban furnishing, passenger ships or cranes.

=== ASTM A588 ===
A588 has a yield strength of at least 50 ksi (340 MPa), and ultimate tensile strength of 70 ksi (480 MPa) for all rolled shapes and plate thicknesses up to 4 in (100 mm) thick. Plates 4–5 in (102–127 mm) thick have yield strength at least 46 ksi (320 MPa) and ultimate tensile strength at least 67 ksi (460 MPa), and plates 5–8 in (127–203 mm) thick have yield strength at least 42 ksi (290 MPa) and ultimate tensile strength at least 63 ksi (430 MPa).

== Uses ==
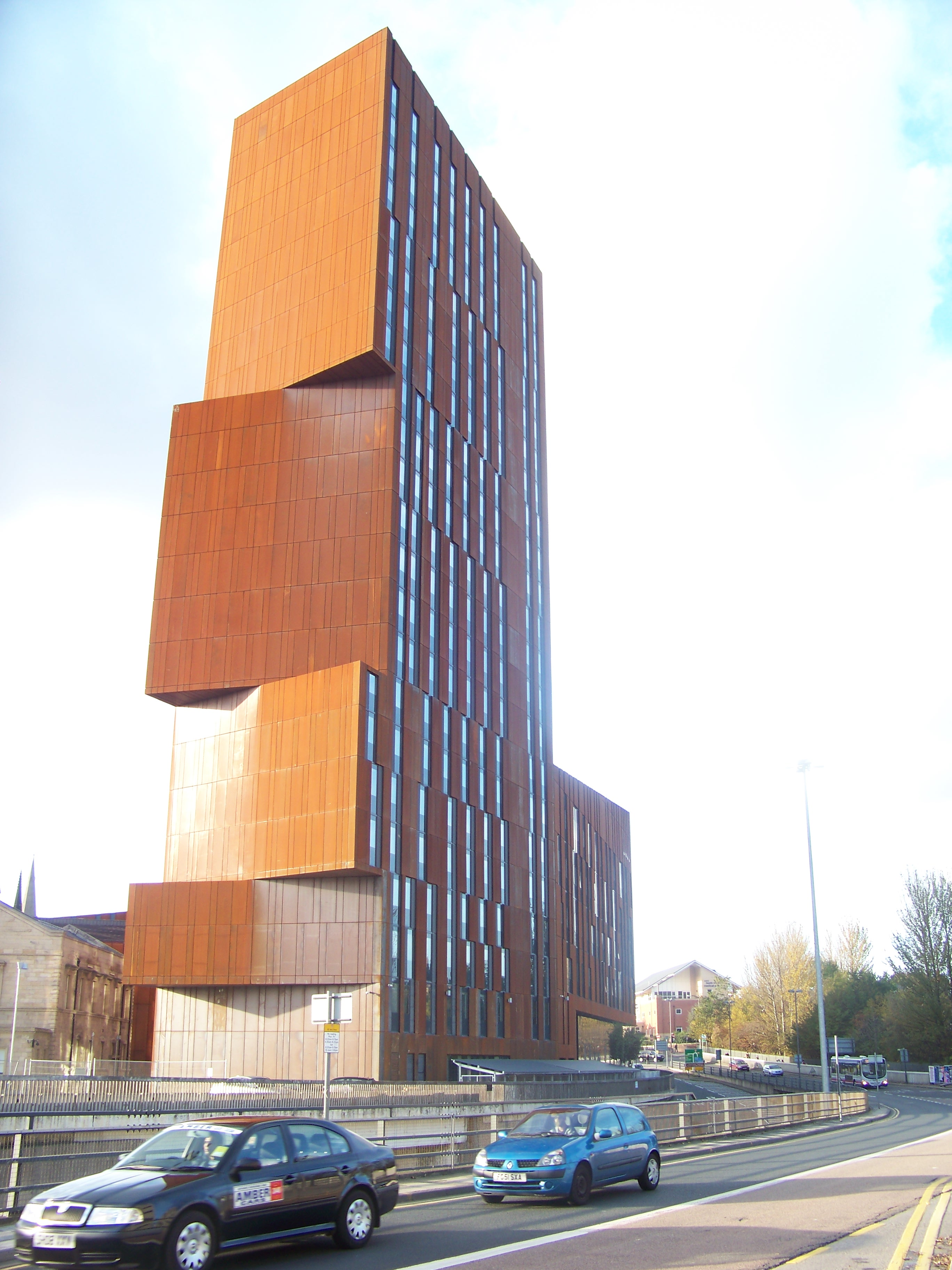
Broadcasting Tower, Leeds, United Kingdom

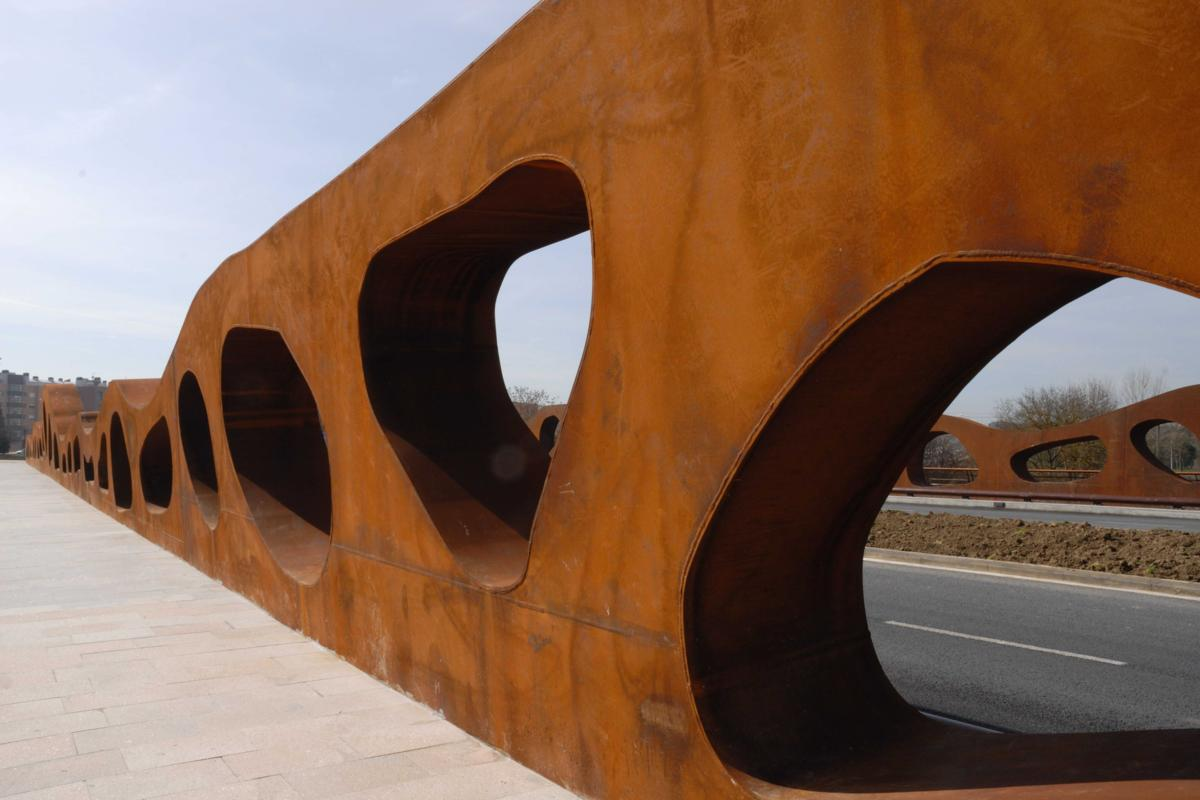
Abetxuko Bridge by Juan Sobrino of PEDELTA at Abetxuko, Vitoria, Spain

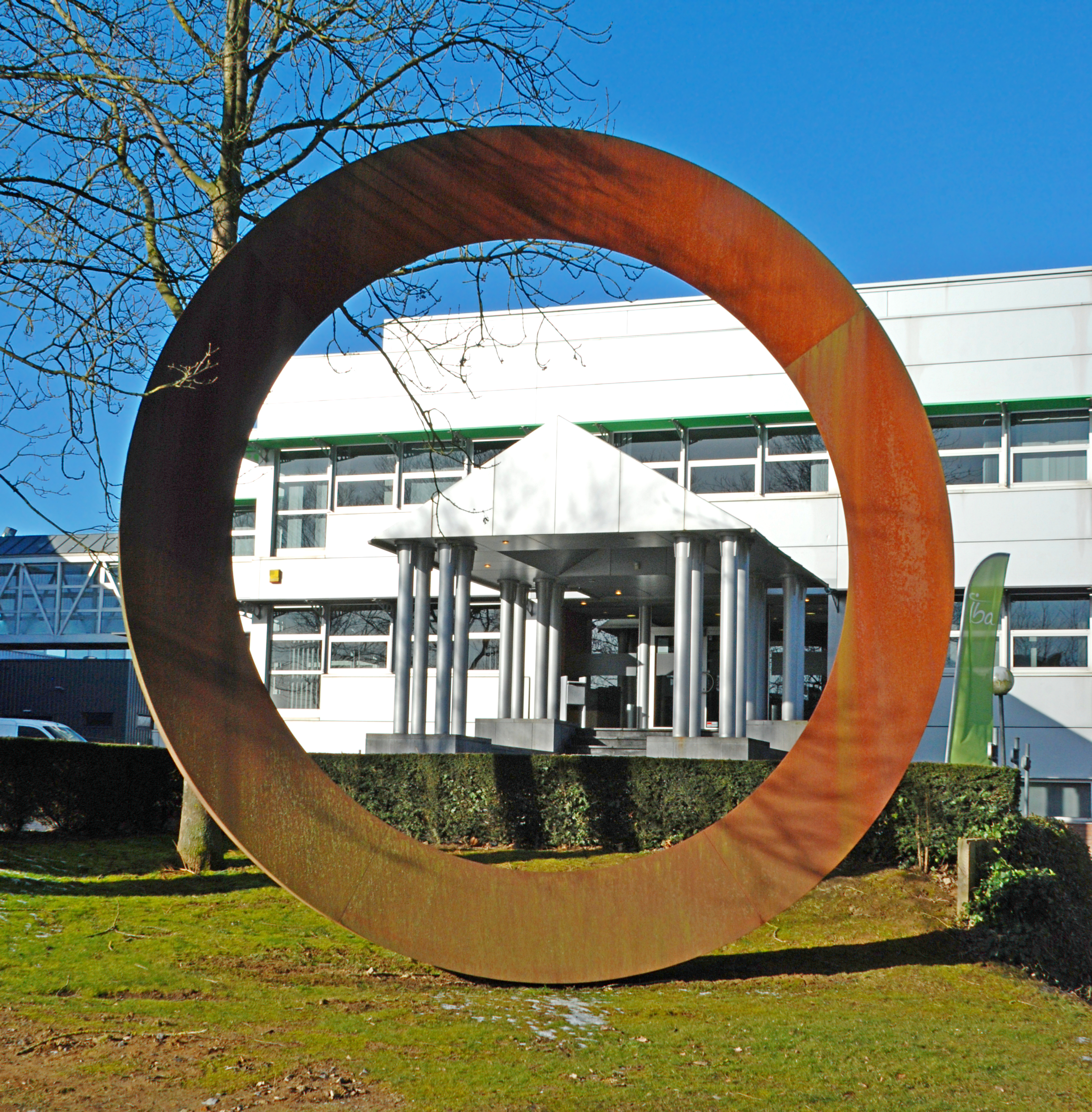
Anneau by Mauro Staccioli at Louvain-la-Neuve, Belgium

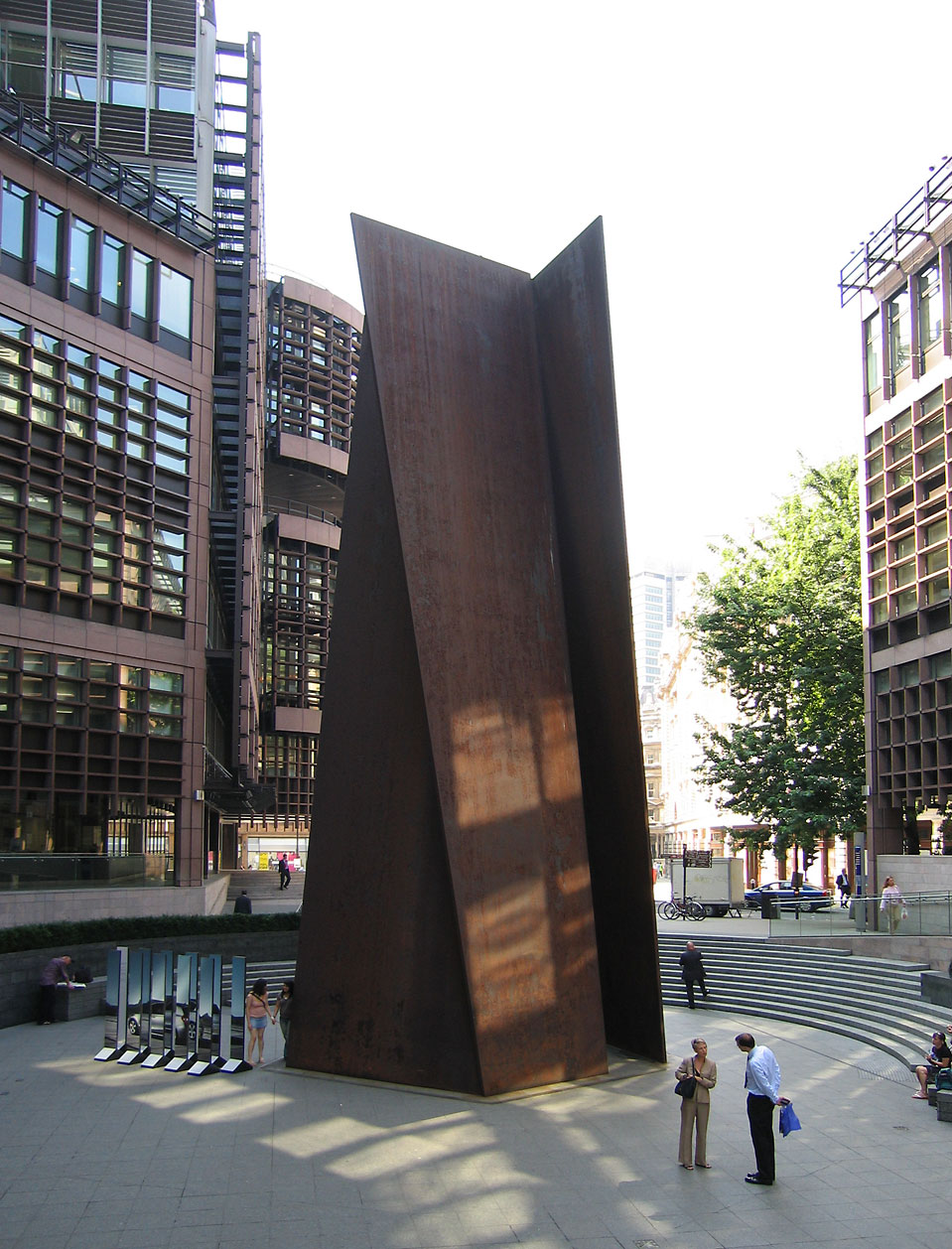
Weathering steel – Fulcrum (1987) by Richard Serra in the Broadgate office estate, London

=== Use in contemporary art ===
Weathering steel is popularly used in outdoor sculptures for its distinctive rust-like appearance, which develops as a stable protective patina. This process gives the works a "distressed" or antique quality that evolves over time. A notable early example is the Chicago Picasso, located in the plaza of the Daley Center Courthouse, itself constructed of weathering steel. Other major examples include Broken Obelisk by Barnett Newman, several of Robert Indiana’s Numbers sculptures and his original Love sculpture, numerous works by Richard Serra, the Alamo in Manhattan, the Angel of the North in Gateshead, Ribbons by Pippa Hale in Leeds, and the Broadcasting Tower at Leeds Beckett University.

Since the 1960s, artists and architects have not only valued weathering steel for its durability, but also embraced the oxidation process as an aesthetic and symbolic element. Sculptors such as Eduardo Chillida, Bernard Venet, and Mauro Staccioli have created monumental works in Corten steel where the evolving patina is integral to the artwork’s meaning.

Art historians and critics have highlighted this reinterpretation of rust as an aesthetic feature. Robert Pincus-Witten described the role of natural processes, including oxidation, in the emergence of postminimalism. Germano Celant, theorist of Arte Povera, emphasized how artists such as Jannis Kounellis and Giovanni Anselmo integrated oxidation-prone materials to underscore themes of change and entropy. Florence de Meredieu argued that rust acts both as a bearer of memory and as a transformative process that confers individuality and historical resonance on materials.

Beyond sculpture and architecture, weathering steel oxidation has also been incorporated into installations and photography. Artists such as Leonardo Drew and Mark Dion use rusted elements to explore decay, memory, and material culture, while the industrial typologies of Bernd and Hilla Becher influenced subsequent generations of artists who turned rust into a metaphor for impermanence.

=== Use in architecture and industry ===
It is also used in bridge and other large structural applications such as the New River Gorge Bridge, the second span of the Newburgh–Beacon Bridge (1980), and the creation of the Australian Centre for Contemporary Art (ACCA) and MONA.

It is very widely used in marine transportation, in the construction of intermodal containers, and visible sheet piling along recently widened sections of London's M25 motorway.

The first use of weathering steel for architectural applications was the John Deere World Headquarters in Moline, Illinois. The building was designed by architect Eero Saarinen, and completed in 1964. The main buildings of Odense University (built 1971–1976), designed by Knud Holscher and Jørgen Vesterholt, are clad in weathering steel, earning them the nickname Rustenborg (Danish for "rusty fortress"). In 1977, Robert Indiana created a Hebrew version of the Love sculpture made from weathering steel using the four-letter word ahava (אהבה, "love" in Hebrew) for the Israel Museum Art Garden in Jerusalem, Israel. In Denmark, all masts for supporting the catenary on electrified railways are made of weathering steel for aesthetic reasons.

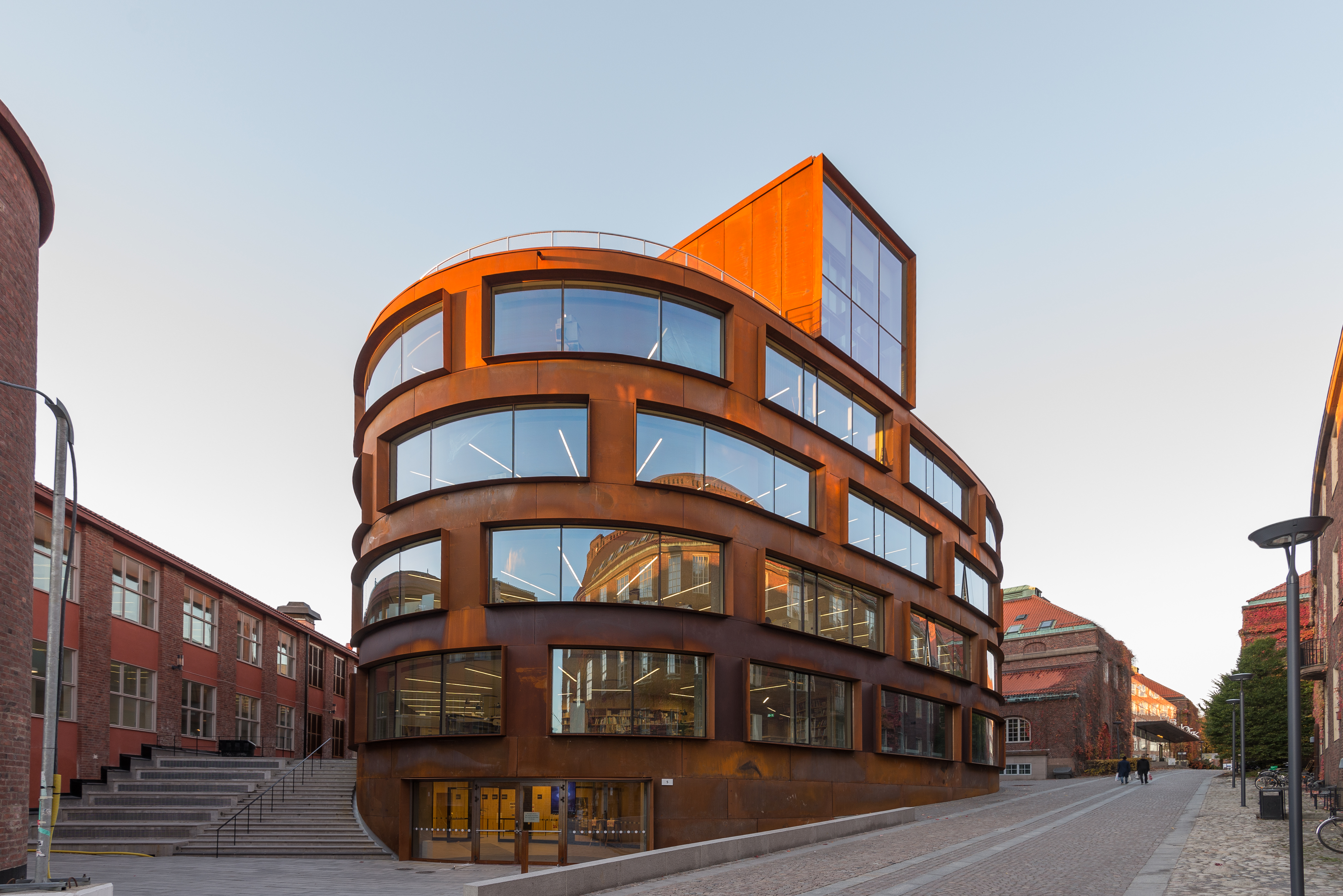
Building for the School of Architecture, part of the KTH Royal Institute of Technology

Weathering steel was used in 1971 for the Highliner electric cars built by the St. Louis Car Company for Illinois Central Railroad. The use of weathering steel was seen as a cost-cutting move in comparison with the contemporary railcar standard of stainless steel. A subsequent order in 1979 was built to similar specs, including weathering steel bodies, by Bombardier. The cars were painted, a standard practice for weathering steel railcars. The durability of weathering steel did not live up to expectations, with rust holes appearing in the railcars. Painting may have contributed to the problem, as painted weathering steel is no more corrosion-resistant than conventional steel, because the protective patina will not form in time to prevent corrosion over a localized area of attack such as a small paint failure. These cars were retired by 2016.

Weathering steel was used to build the exterior of Barclays Center, made up of 12,000 pre-weathered steel panels engineered by ASI Limited & SHoP Construction. The New York Times says of the material: "While it can look suspiciously unfinished to the casual observer, it has many fans in the world of art and architecture." In 2015, a new building for the KTH Royal Institute of Technology School of Architecture was completed on its campus. The use of weathering steel helped the futuristic shapes of the facade fit in well with its much older surroundings and in 2015 it was awarded the Kasper Salin Prize.

== Disadvantages ==
Using weathering steel in construction presents several challenges. Ensuring that weld-points weather at the same rate as the other materials may require special welding techniques or material. Weathering steel is not rustproof in itself: if water is allowed to accumulate on the surface of the steel, it will experience a higher corrosion rate, so provision for drainage must be made. According to the NTSB, lack of drainage is what ultimately led to the collapse of the Fern Hollow Bridge. Weathering steel is sensitive to humid subtropical climates, and in such environments it is possible that the protective patina may not stabilize but instead continue to corrode. For example, the former Omni Coliseum, built in 1972 in Atlanta, never stopped rusting, and eventually large holes appeared in the structure. This was a major factor in the decision to demolish it just 25 years after construction. The same thing can happen in environments laden with sea salt. Hawaii's Aloha Stadium, built in 1975, is one example of this. Weathering steel's normal surface weathering can also lead to rust stains on nearby surfaces.

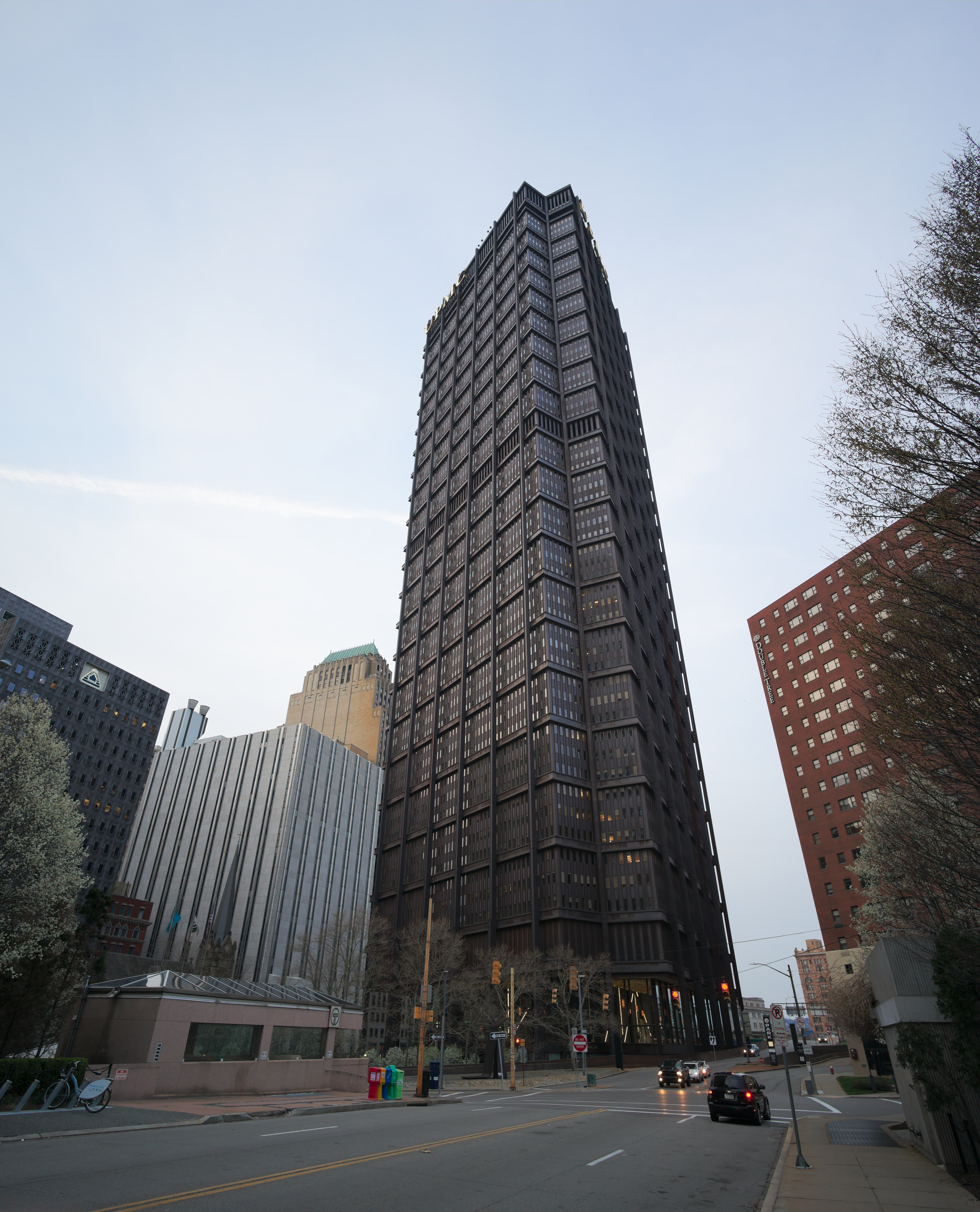
U.S. Steel Tower

The rate at which some weathering steels form the desired patina varies strongly with the presence of atmospheric pollutants which catalyze corrosion. While the process is generally successful in large urban centers, the weathering rate is much slower in more rural environments. Uris Hall, a social sciences building on Cornell University's main campus in Ithaca, a small city in Upstate New York, did not achieve the predicted surface finish on its Bethlehem Steel Mayari-R weathering steel framing within the predicted time. Rainwater runoff from the slowly rusting steel stained the numerous large windows and increased maintenance costs. Corrosion without the formation of a protective layer apparently led to the need for emergency structural reinforcement and galvanizing in 1974, less than two years after opening.

The U.S. Steel Tower in Pittsburgh, Pennsylvania, was constructed by U.S. Steel in part to showcase COR-TEN steel. The initial weathering of the material resulted in a discoloration, known as "bleeding" or "runoff", of the surrounding city sidewalks and nearby buildings. A cleanup effort was orchestrated by the corporation once weathering was complete to clean the markings. A few of the nearby sidewalks were left uncleaned, and remain a rust color. This problem has been reduced in newer formulations of weathering steel. Staining can be prevented if the structure can be designed so that water does not drain from the steel onto concrete where stains would be visible.
