= Petersham Meadows =

Water-meadow in Petersham, London, England

Coordinates: 51°26′58″N 0°18′10″W

Petersham Meadows are a 24-acre water-meadow that lie alongside the River Thames in Petersham, London, bounded by Buccleuch Gardens, Manor Farm Livery Stables, the main Petersham Road (A307) and River Lane. The Capital Ring footpath crosses the meadow to reach Petersham and the Thames Path follows the towpath.

Petersham Meadows were originally part of the Ham House estate. Since 1902 the view from Richmond Hill has been protected by an Act of Parliament. There have been cows on the meadow since at least the 19th century. In 1880 the tenancy was taken by Mr Hornby, who used the milk to supply the Hornby and Clarke dairy. Their shop is still on Richmond Hill, although no longer a dairy. The lease passed to Express Dairies but in 1982 a private investor took the lease but was unable to maintain a dairy herd. In 1998 the Petersham Trust was set up to protect the Meadows and preserve it for grazing. Richmond Council took over management of the Meadows in 2001. The National Trust have been caretaker since 2010 and pay an annual rent on St Peter's Day of a posy of wildflowers for the Mayor of Richmond. Originally they had cows on the field, but after incidents with dogs these were replaced. Every summer they move a small herd of Belted Galloway cattle on to the meadow to help maintain the biodiversity.

The view over the meadows has been painted by Sir Joshua Reynolds, J. M. W. Turner and many others.

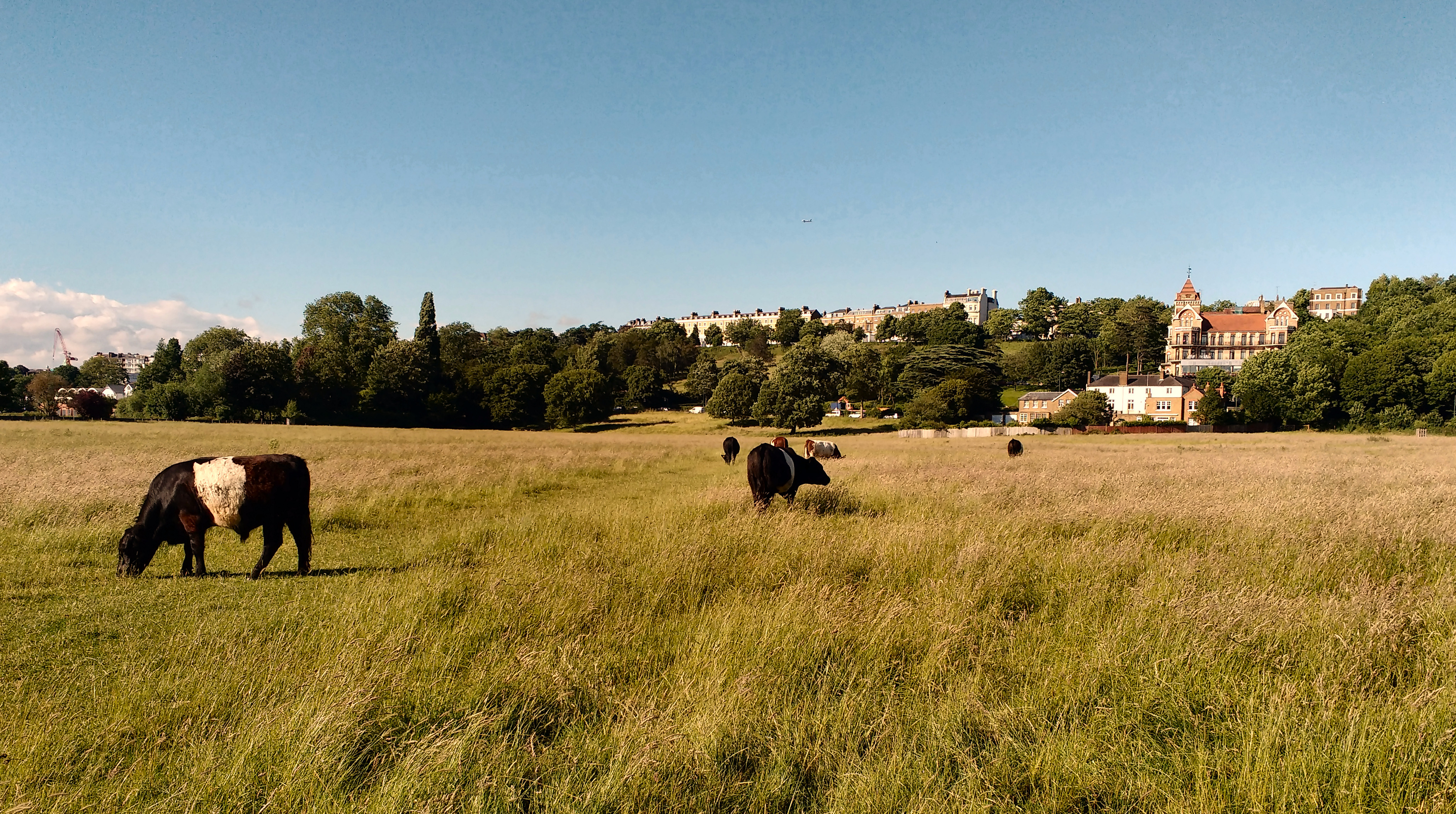
View towards Richmond

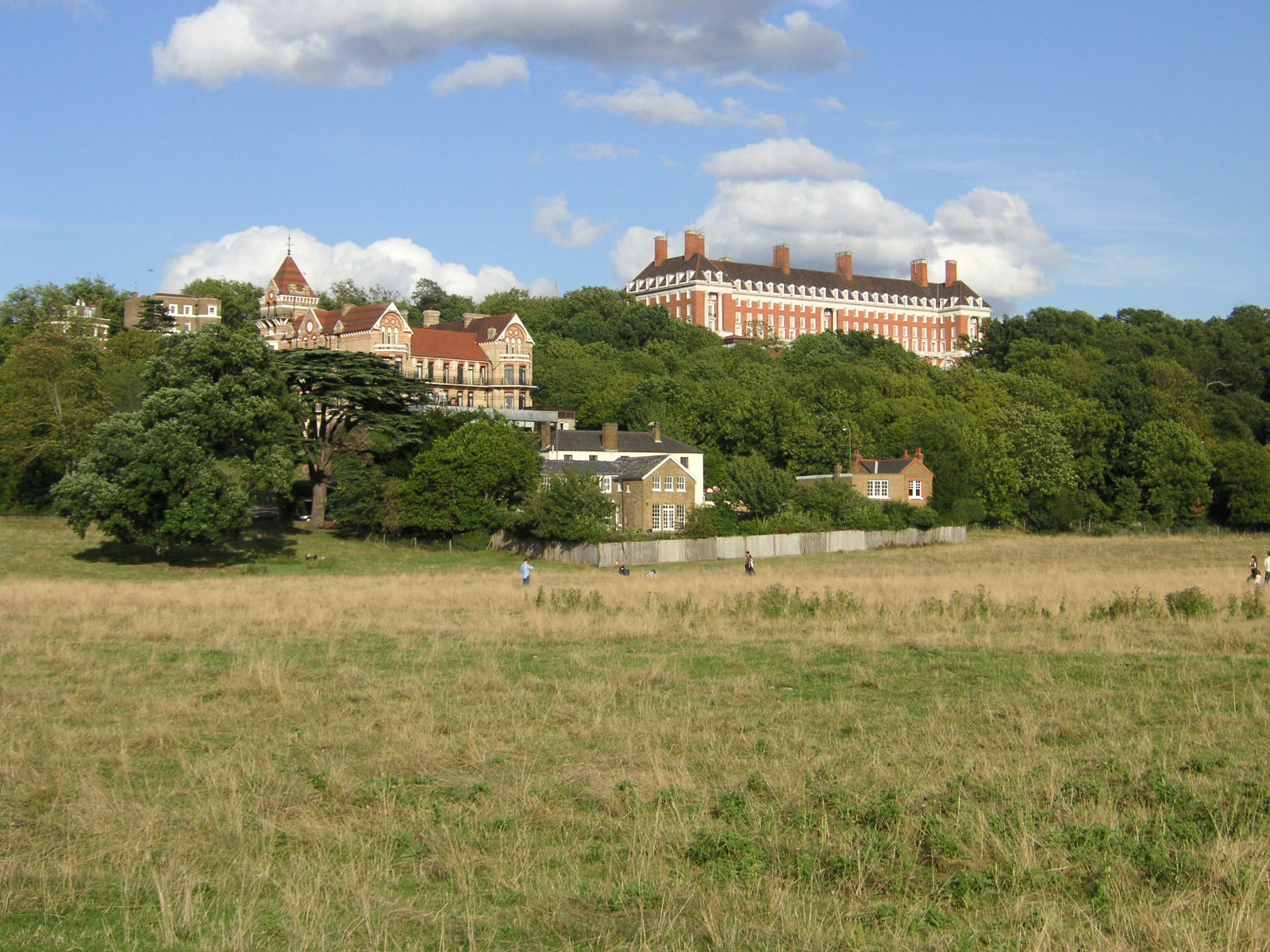
Petersham Hotel, and the former Star and Garter Home

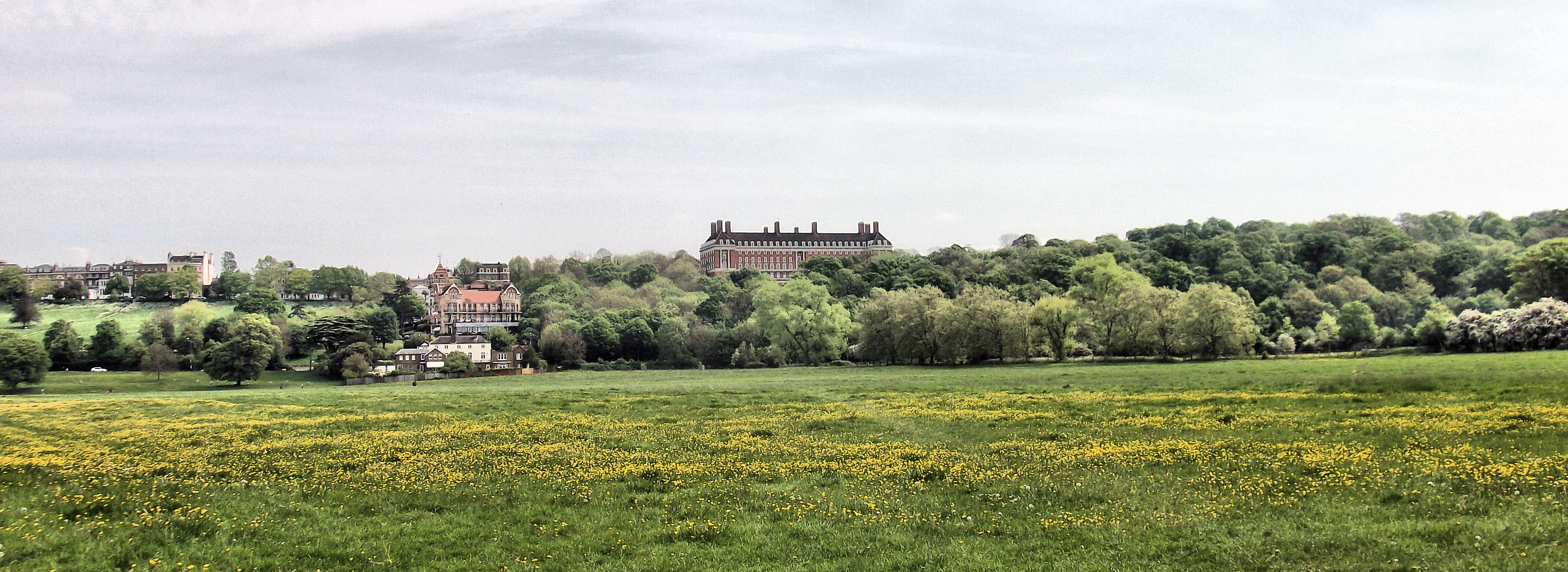
The former Star and Garter Home seen from Petersham Meadows

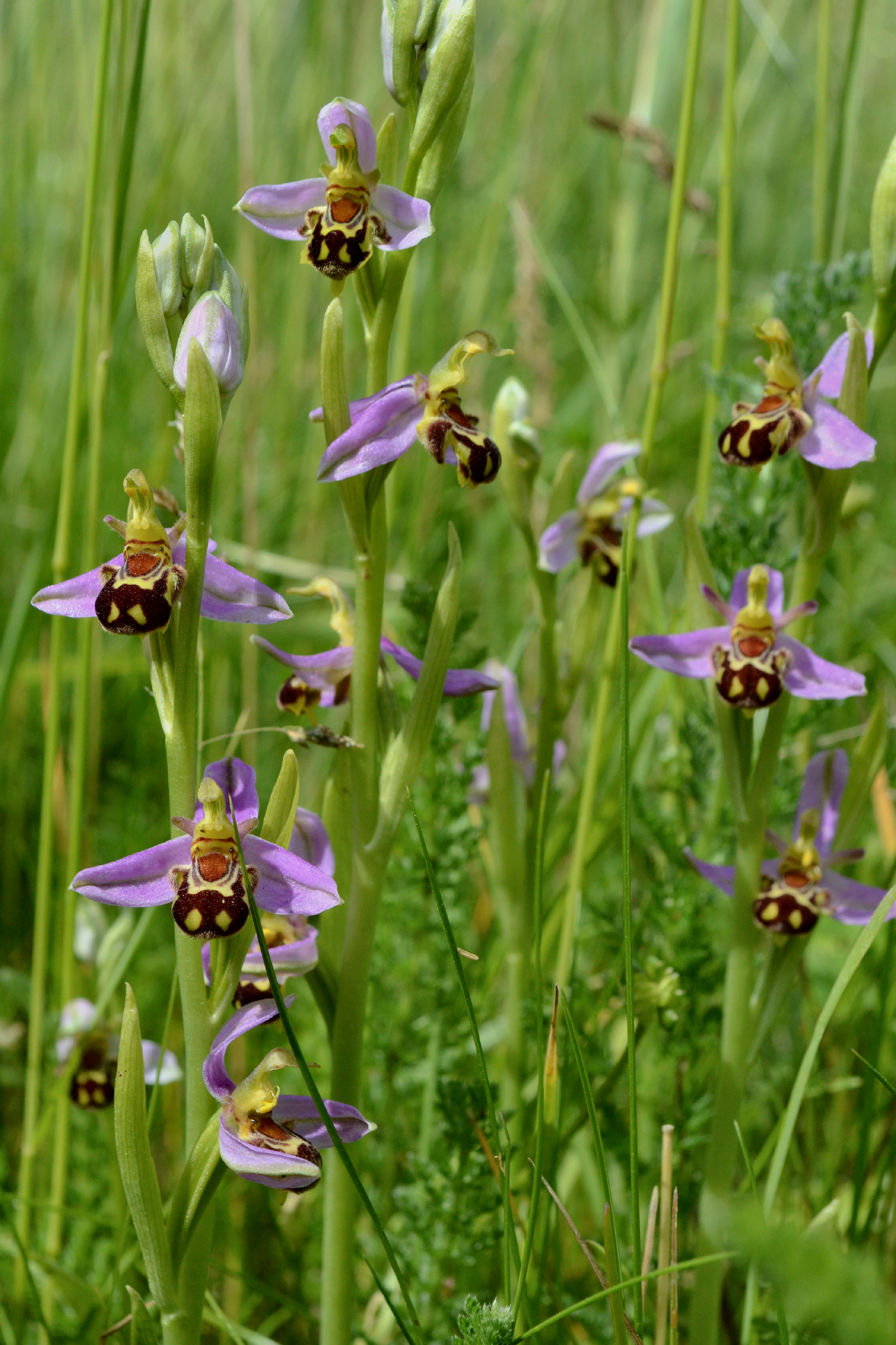
Bee orchids

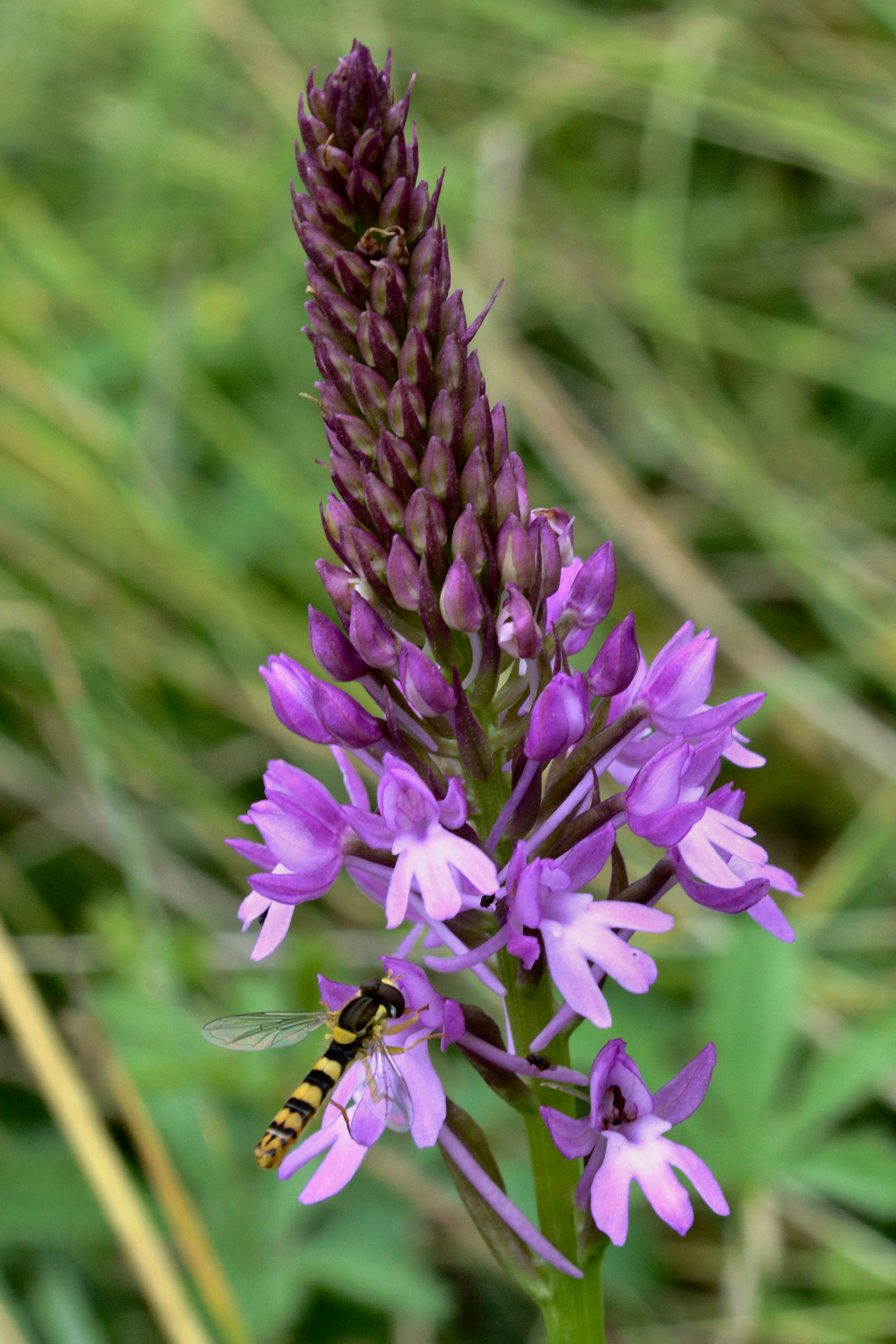
Pyramidal orchid
