= Terrace and Buccleuch Gardens =

Public gardens in the London Borough of Richmond upon Thames

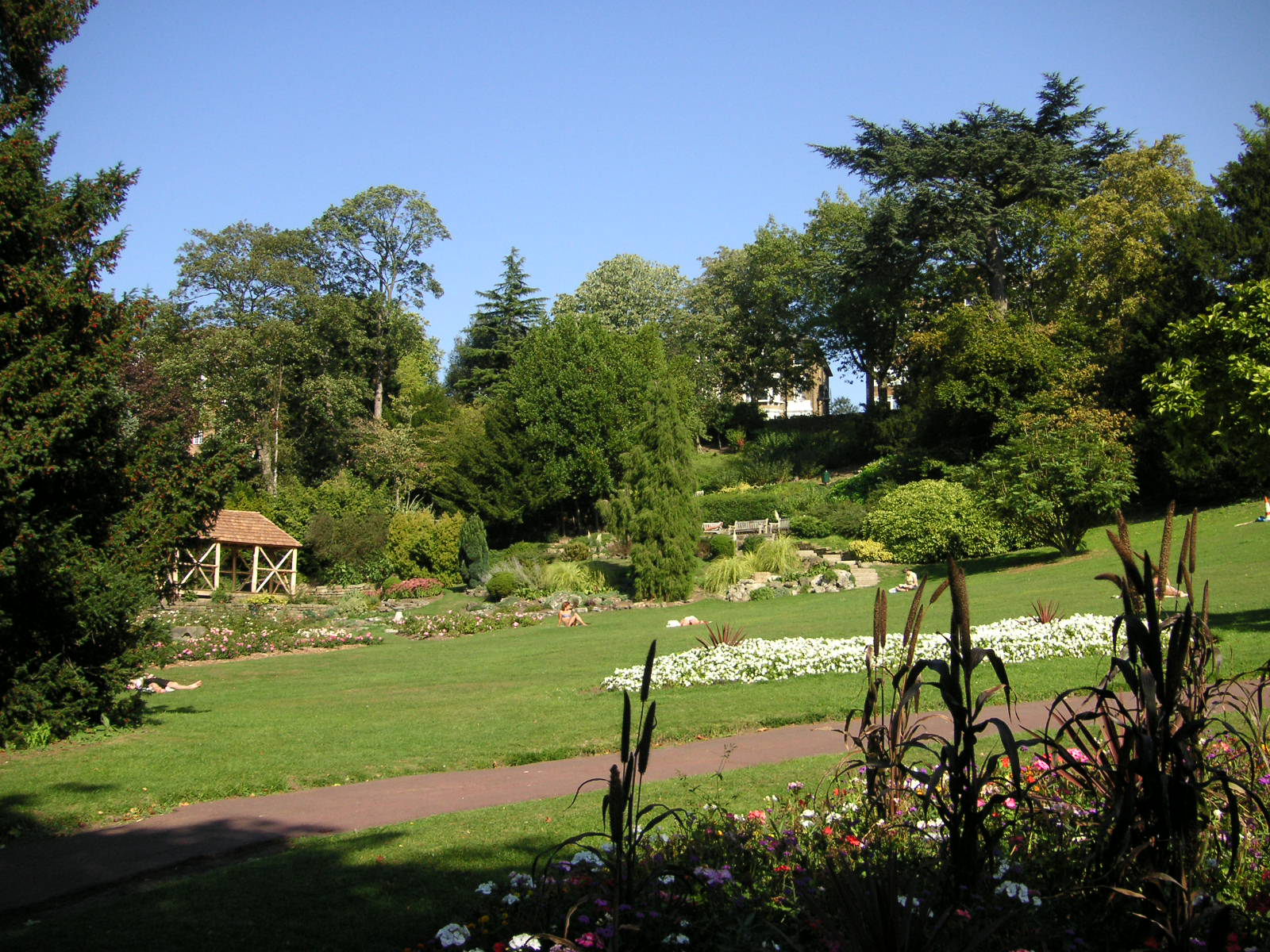
- Terrace Gardens: looking north-east up Richmond Hill.

- Location within London Borough of Richmond upon Thames
- Type: Public park
- Location: Richmond, London, England
- Coordinates: 51.4536°N 0.3009°W
- Area: Roughly 5.0 hectares (12.35 acres)
- Created: 1887
- Operator: London Borough of Richmond Upon Thames
- Status: Open year-round

Designations

National Register of Historic Parks and Gardens
- Official name: Terrace and Buccleuch Gardens
- Designated: 24 August 2001
- Reference no.: 1001551

Terrace and Buccleuch Gardens are a pair of public gardens in Richmond, London that were consolidated into a public park in 1887. They sit on the east bank of the Thames on the western slope of Richmond Hill. The gardens are Grade II listed on the Register of Historic Parks and Gardens by Historic England and are adjacent to the nearby Richmond Terrace Walk, also listed, which along with the River Thames forms the eastern and western boundaries of the park. They cover an area of approximately five hectares (12.35 acres).

The Thames Landscape Strategy noted that the gardens were one of the most popular sections along the Thames. Its location straddling the river as well as views, plantations, and surviving historic features have been described as some of the gardens' most attractive features with one writer suggesting it to be "a serious contender for the title of London's prettiest (if steepest) open space".

== History ==
The land which the gardens now sit on was common land known as Hill Common until the early 17th century when it is said a seat was placed for enjoyment of the view. It was around this time that it became the site of clay excavation and brickworks. The site was eventually occupied by three estates of which none survive, those being the houses and gardens of Buccleuch House (c. 1760), Lansdowne House (c. 1765) and Cardigan House (c. 1791). In 1769, having been granted land on the slopes of Richmond Hill by the Vestry of Richmond, the Duke and Duchess of Montagu had it modelled into a decorated garden; in 1790 the gardens were remarked on by Horace Walpole as being of understated beauty. Certain sources suggest that, in 1842, the Duke of Buccleuch hosted Queen Victoria and Prince Albert among other notable people such as the Duke of Wellington and former Prime Minister Lord Melbourne after being made Privy Counsellor and Lord Privy Seal, although these are not well substantiated. In 1863 Buccleuch consolidated the gardens of Lansdowne House with that of Buccleuch House, having acquired the former and demolishing the home. Shortly after Buccleuch's death in 1884 his son put the estate up for sale in 1886 for £30,000: it was bought by the Richmond Vestry in order to preserve the gardens from development that would spoil the views from Richmond Terrace. The vestry sold Buccleuch House to John Whittaker Ellis; it was reacquired by Richmond Council in 1937. As Buccleuch had been president of the Royal Horticultural Society, the gardens were deemed to be of good design and thus were left largely as they were.

The gardens were opened to the public on 21 May 1887 by Princess Mary, representing Queen Victoria, with the ceremony also being attended by her husband the Duke of Teck and their daughter Princess May, the future queen consort of King George V. On their opening, the gardens were widely praised in newspapers, with the Thames Valley Times particularly noting the secluded feeling and impressive view. Landslips in the 1920s due to the poor ground stability caused largely by clay extraction centuries earlier led to a need to modernise the drainage system. Part of the grounds of Cardigan House were purchased in 1926, enabling the gardens to be extended: they were developed in the 1960s. The purchasing of Buccleuch House further allowed for a footpath to be created between Petersham Meadows and Richmond Bridge. The gardens were refurbished by Richmond Council in 2012.

== Description ==
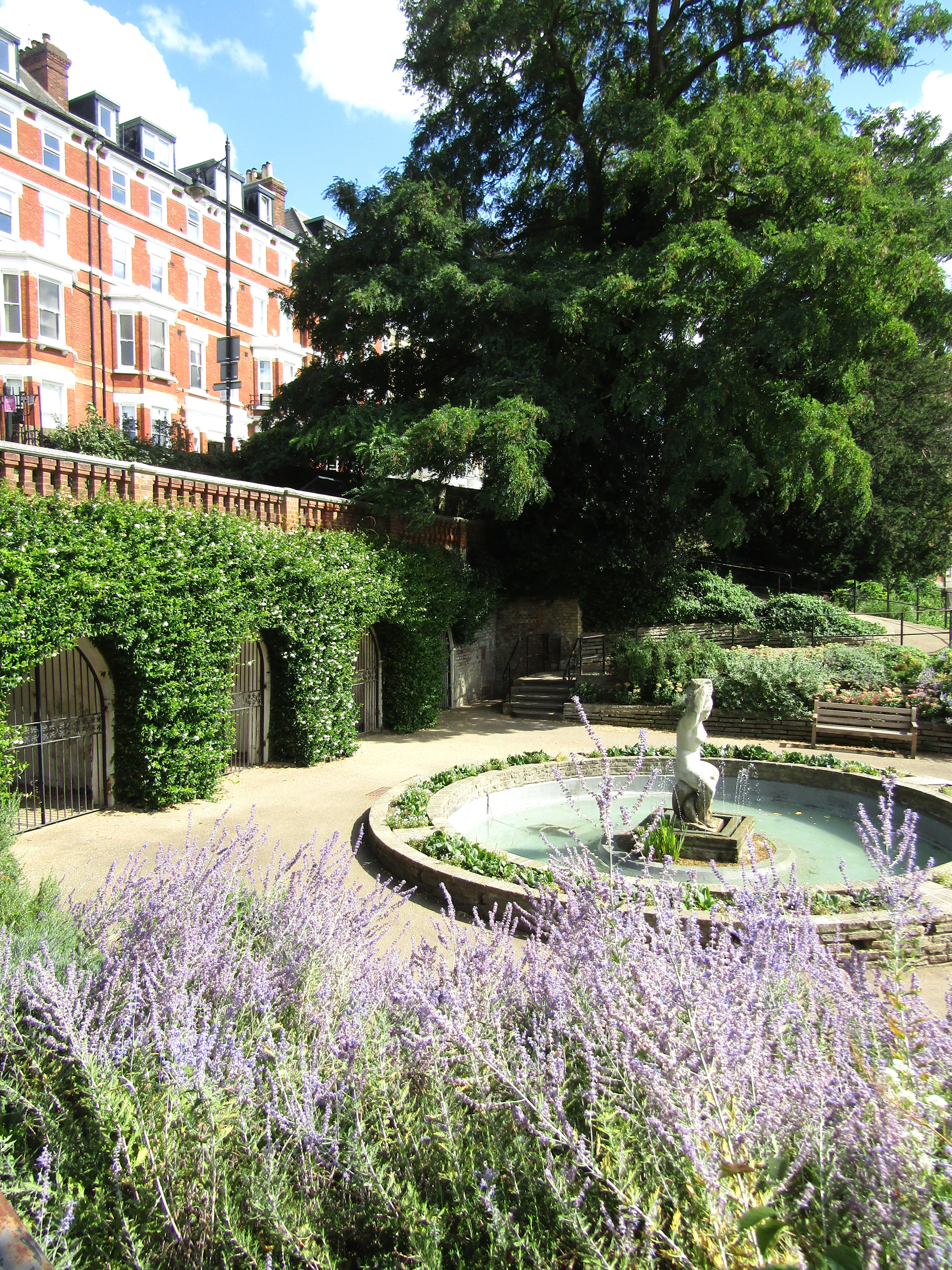
The Aphrodite statue Bulbous Betty and round pond in Terrace Gardens with the balustrade of Richmond Terrace Walk visible on the left.

Terrace and Buccleuch Gardens occupy an irregular plot of land, bounded by the Thames to the west, Richmond Terrace Walk to the east, as well as Terrace Fields and Petersham Meadows to the south. The gardens sit near multiple parks and green spaces including those already mentioned as well as Petersham Common and the Grade I listed Richmond Park a short distance away.

There are a few remaining features of the original houses such as surviving boundary walls, and the paths still largely reflect the layout of the 19th-century gardens. Mature trees are scattered throughout, particularly around the perimeter of Terrace Gardens, with lawns in between. Plantations of ornamental trees and rhododendrons are present in the 'woodland garden' dating from the 1960s. An 18th-century tunnel known as Grotto Gate connects the gardens to Petersham Road.

A rebuilt wooden shelter within the gardens is surrounded by a rock garden from 1928 and stands next to a rosary and a surviving sundial – a restored ornament of Buccleuch House's gardens. A prominent feature that sits on the site of the Landsdowne House grounds is a 19th-century terrace that hosts a centrepiece in the form of a round pond and a statue of Aphrodite made from Portland stone and sculpted by Allan Howes. At the centre of Terrace Gardens sits a thatched tea-house with views of the Thames. To its rear is a 19th-century icehouse designed as an ornamental garden decoration and adorned with seashells. To the west is a statue of Father Thames by John Bacon; it was purchased by the Duke of Montagu in 1781 and restored in the 1990s – the statue is one of two known original Coade stone castings, with the other being at Ham House.

There are many internal views that appear well preserved to how they would have appeared in the 19th century but, most famously, the gardens being on Richmond Hill allow them along with Richmond Terrace Walk to command sweeping westward views which have been the subject of significant efforts of preservation, including the exceptional Richmond, Ham and Petersham Open Spaces Act, 1902.

== Protected view ==
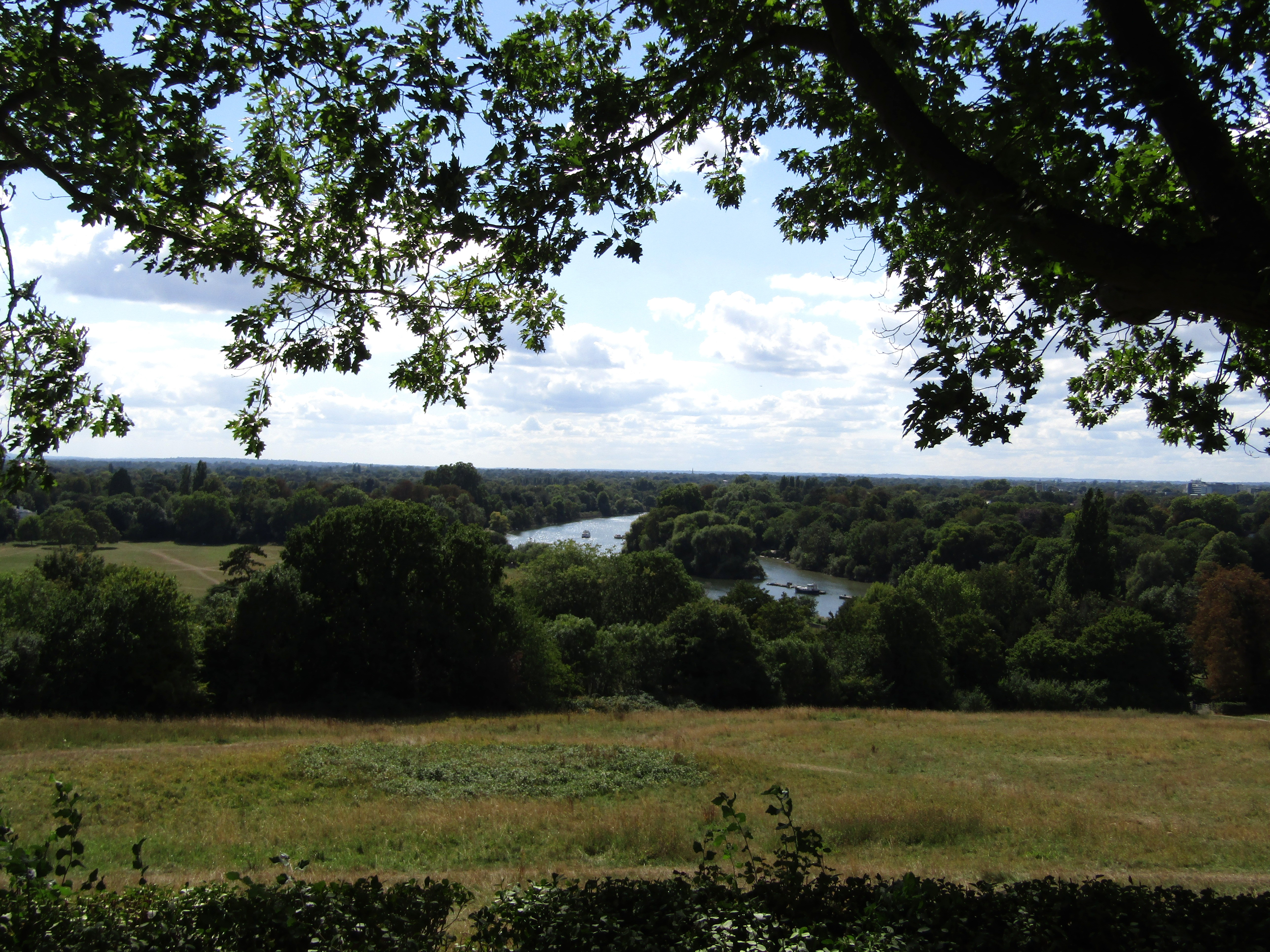
The protected view from Richmond Hill, Glover's Island visible in the centre

The preservation act followed an episode surrounding the proposed sale of Glover's Island, including the possibility of it falling into the hands of an advertising firm. In a parliamentary debate in 1896 John Burns, Member of Parliament for Battersea, mentioned the prominence of the view from Richmond Terrace in poetry, and claimed that it was one "which the average Englishman admired and cherished probably more than any other view within a hundred miles of London". In 1900, the island was eventually bought and given to the Richmond Corporation alongside Petersham Lodge for the preservation of the view from the Terrace. The grounds of Marble Hill House were also under threat of being developed but eventually were opened as a public park, now administered by English Heritage.

In 1964 planning permission was submitted for the building of a hotel where the current Star and Garter Home stands. Following petitioning from the Richmond Society, the project was abandoned.

== In art ==
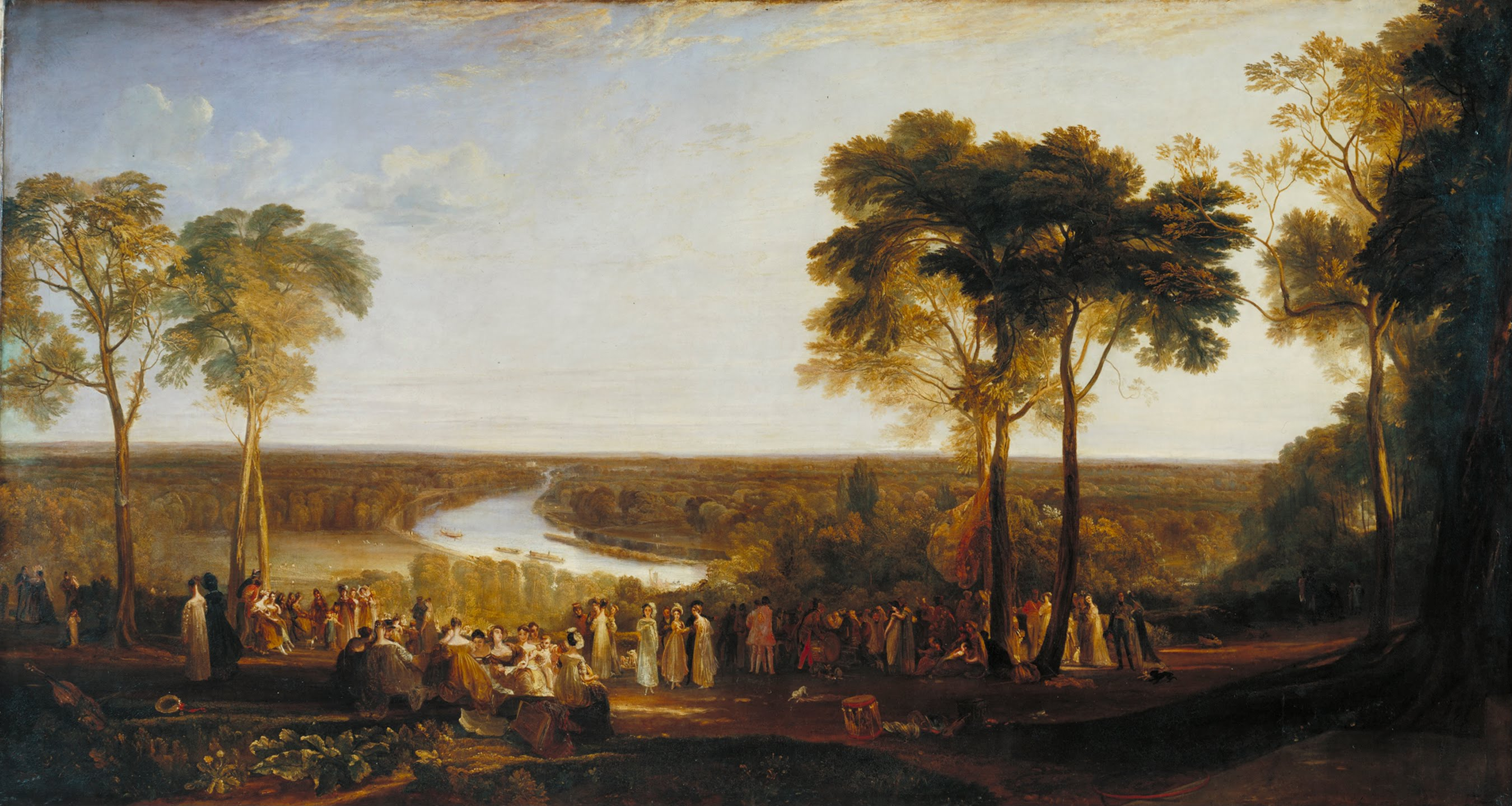
England: Richmond Hill, on the Prince Regent's Birthday, 1819, Tate Britain by J. M. W. Turner

The stretch of the Thames through Richmond has been seen as a key location where the idealisation of landscape and landscape gardening grew hand in hand beginning in the early 18th century. The views from Richmond Hill have made the area a subject of paintings and other depictions from various artists throughout history. These include several paintings by J. M. W. Turner including England: Richmond Hill, on the Prince Regent's Birthday, and Thomson's Aeolian Harp. Other artists who have depicted the view include Thomas Christopher Hofland, Joshua Reynolds, Antonio Joli, Jan Siberechts, Jasper Francis Cropsey, George Vicat Cole, and William Birch. The view of Richmond Terrace from the opposite bank in 1780 was also painted by William Marlow in View of Terrace, Richmond Hill.

== In literature ==
The view from the terrace is said to have inspired Alexander Pope and is described in The Heart of Midlothian by Sir Walter Scott.
