= Rosehaugh =

Rosehaugh plc
- Industry: Property development

Rosehaugh plc was a major property developer in the City of London and the Docklands in the 1980s and 1990s.

Accountant Godfrey Bradman acquired Rosehaugh, a former tea company, as a quoted shell company in 1978 and sought to turn it into a development company.

The company became known because of its involvement in major redevelopment projects, such as the redevelopment of much of the Docklands and Surrey Quays (e.g. New Caledonian Wharf), Lewisham as well as a number of high-profile developments in the City, such as Broadgate through its joint venture with Stanhope; Rosehaugh Stanhope Developments.

Bradman lost control of the company in February 1991 and left in early 1992. The company's shares were suspended at 7.25p on 31 November 1992 and receivers Peat Marwick were appointed the following day.
