= Broadgate =

Office and retail estate in the City of London

Coordinates: 51.519°N 0.0835°W

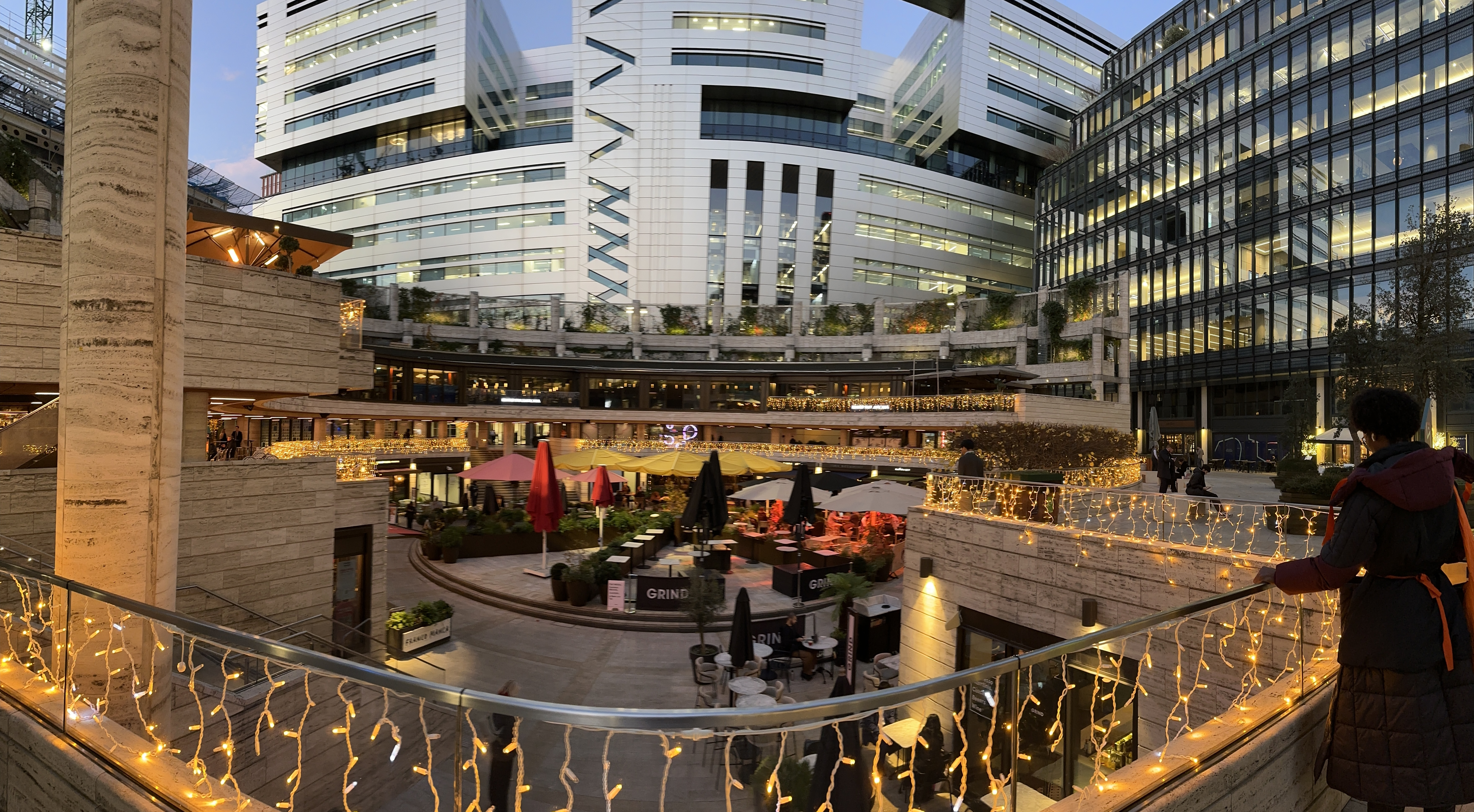
Broadgate Circle

Broadgate is a large, 32-acre (13 ha) office and retail estate in the Bishopsgate area of the City of London. It is owned by British Land and GIC and managed by British Land.

== History ==
The original developer was a joint venture of Rosehaugh and Stanhope plc. It was built by a Bovis / Tarmac Construction joint venture and was the largest office development in London until the arrival of Canary Wharf in the early 1990s. The original scheme was designed by Arup Associates, Team 2, headed by Peter Foggo who later left Arup to set up his own practice Peter Foggo Associates where he completed the initial phase of works.

== Location ==
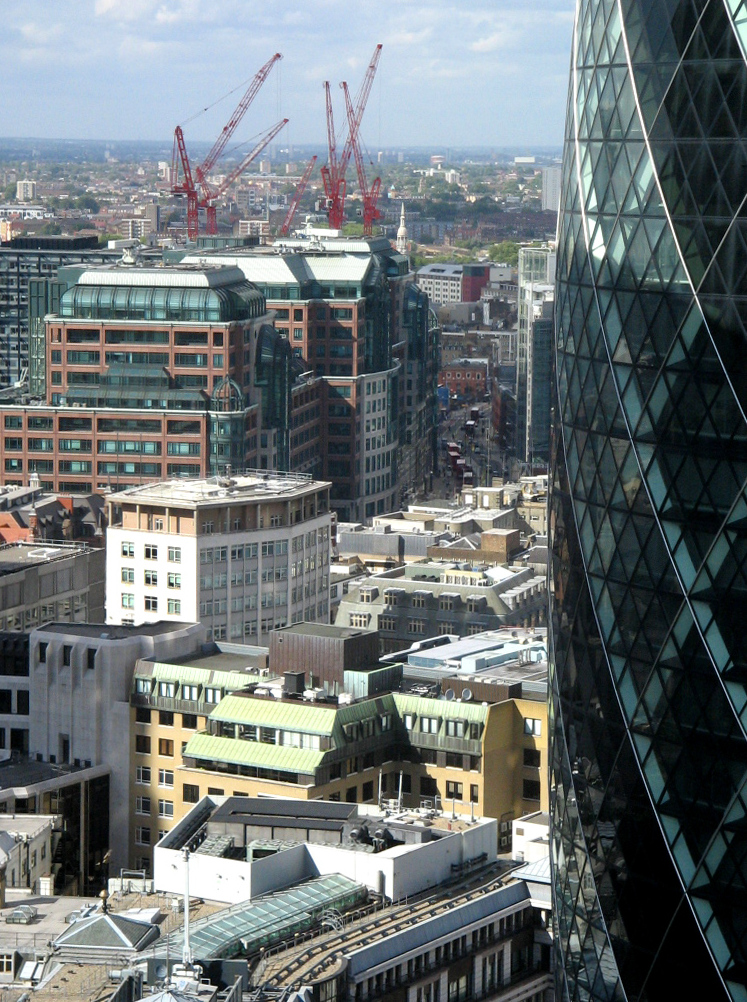
Part of the Broadgate Centre, viewed from the top of the Willis Building in 2006. The cranes for the Broadgate Tower can be seen in the background.

The modern and mainly-pedestrianised development is located on the original site of Broad Street station (closed in 1986) and beside and above the railway approaches into Liverpool Street station. The perimeter of the managed estate is Bishopsgate to the east, Sun Street, Appold Street and the eastern part of Worship Street to the north, the southern part of Wilson Street to the west and Eldon Street and Liverpool Street to the south. Included in the estate are Broadgate Circle and Exchange Square.

Boundary changes which came into effect in 1994 now place the entire estate within the Bishopsgate area of the City of London, previously it was in Shoreditch in the London Borough of Hackney.

== Ownership ==
Several different companies, including British Rail, have participated in the development of the estate. Between 2003 and 2009 the whole estate was owned by British Land, which has been involved since 1984. Statistics from British Land as of 2009 indicated that the estate provides 360,000 m^{2} (3,900,000 sq ft) of office, retail and leisure accommodation spread over 129,000 m^{2} (32 acres) and more than 30,000 people are employed there. In October 2009, British Land sold a 50% share of the estate to the Blackstone Group. In 2014, GIC agreed to acquire the 50% interest in Broadgate owned by the Blackstone Group.

== Buildings ==
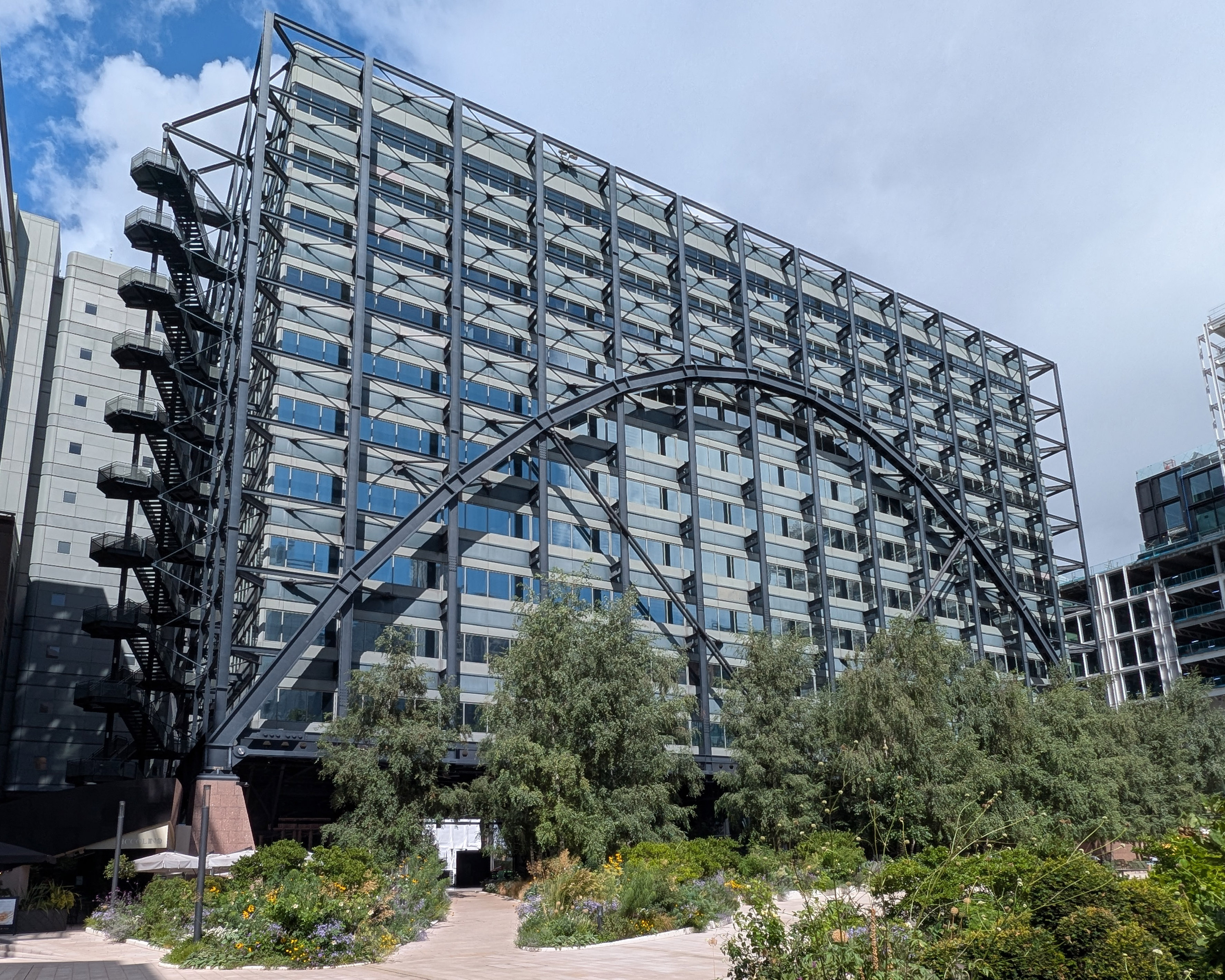
Exchange House seen from Exchange Square

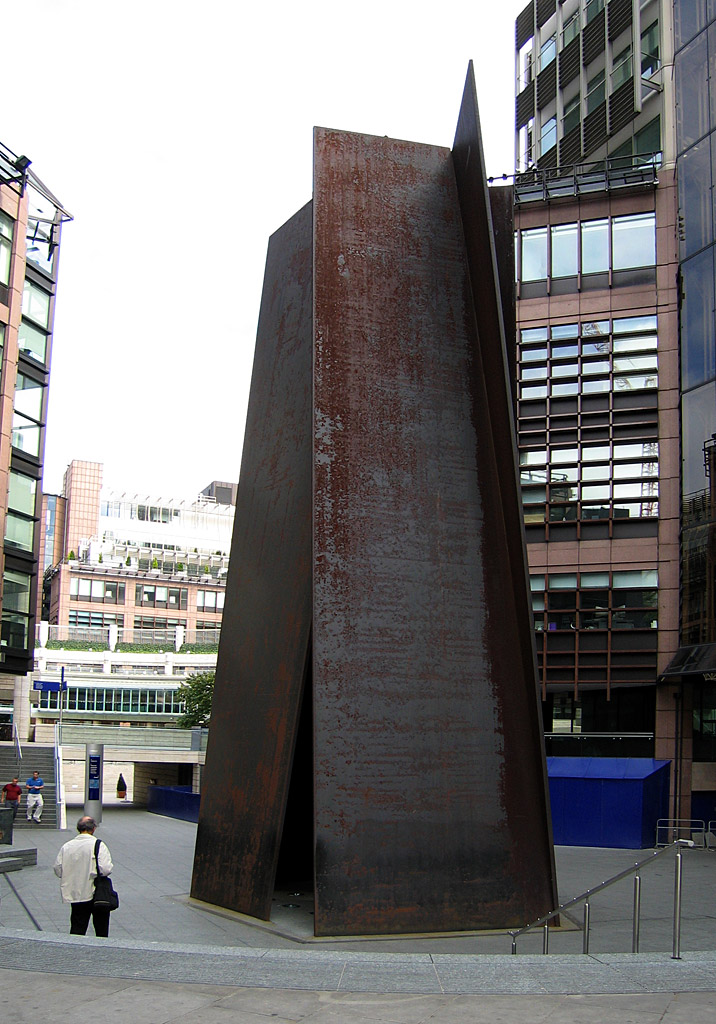
The Broadgate site features several works of public art, the largest of which is Richard Serra's 55 ft (17 m) high, free standing sculpture, Fulcrum.

The 538-foot (164 m) Broadgate Tower was completed in 2008 and added more than 820,000 sq ft (76,000 m^{2}) of commercial floorspace to the estate. This building stands over the railway tracks out of Liverpool Street station. Exchange House, designed by Skidmore, Owings, & Merrill and completed in 1990, also spans the railway with just 5% of the building's footprint touching the ground. It received the Twenty-five Year Award from the American Institute of Architects in 2015.

In early 2011 there was controversy over the redevelopment of the site of a Peter Foggo building, when it was suggested by the City of London's Chief Planning Officer Peter Rees and Ken Shuttleworth that Foggo would have been pleased that the building would be demolished.

The headquarters of Swiss bank UBS are situated at 5 Broadgate, a steel-clad groundscraper designed by Ken Shuttleworth of Make Architects.

== Events ==
On 7 August 2010, Broadgate became host to the twice-monthly Broadgate Farmers' Market.

In the winter months Broadgate Circle used to host Broadgate Ice; London's only turn up and skate ice rink. In November 2017, Broadgate installed their first Christmas market.

== Arts Programme ==
In 2012, Broadgate announced the Broadgate Art Trail which would showcase 16 artworks over a 32-acre plot. Artworks in Broadgate include Rush Hour by George Segal, Chromorama by David Batchelor, Broadgate Venus by Fernando Botero, The Broad Family by Xavier Corberó, Eye-I by Bruce McLean, and Fulcrum by Richard Serra.
