= New Caledonian Wharf =

Gated community in London, England

Coordinates: 51.4974°N 0.0333°W

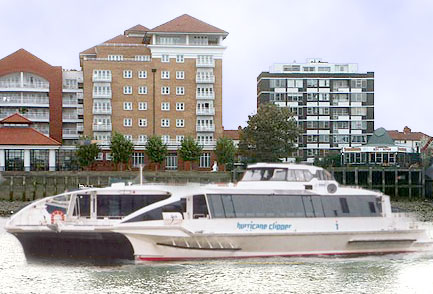
A Thames Clipper passing New Caledonian Wharf

New Caledonian Wharf is a luxury gated community in the Rotherhithe area of London on the River Thames. The site was originally part of the Surrey Docks and known as Redriff Wharf, and served as a commercial wharf until the 1970s.

== History ==
The wharf was originally known as Redriff Wharf and continued to be a commercial wharf until the late 1970s. It was located adjacent to Greenland Dock and part of the Surrey Docks, though it was directly accessible from the river. After falling into disrepair, Rosehaugh acquired the site in 1989 and redeveloped it into 104 flats together with architects Shepheard Epstein Hunter.

The building has a large central courtyard, which includes a fountain. The community has use of a private gym and swimming pool, available only to the residents and their guests. The wharf also has 24-hour portage. Many of the flats in the wharf have balconies looking over the Thames, with the views from Greenwich to Canary Wharf.
