= Edgar Allan Howes =

English sculptor

- Born: 11 January 1888; East Dereham, Norfolk, England
- Died: 11 December 1969 (aged 81)
- Known for: Sculpture

Edgar Allan Howes (11 January 1888 – 11 December 1969) was an English sculptor.

== Biography ==
Edgar was born in East Dereham, Norfolk in 1888 to Robert William Howes, a photographer. He would move with his parents to Richmond in London at a young age.

Howes would study art at the Royal Academy Schools where he would win a number of prizes as well as the Landseer Scholarship and later at the Slade School of Art. His studies would be interrupted by the outbreak of the First World War in which he would serve, finally graduating in 1920. Howes would become a member of the Royal Society of British sculptors and later become a fellow.

He would begin exhibiting at the Royal Academy, as well as at the Royal Society of Arts and the Royal Glasgow Institute of the Fine Arts.

== Works ==
Howes's first known Commission was the Kew War Memorial which stands on Kew Green.

His marble sculpture, The Madonna of the Lily was exhibited at the Royal Academy in 1932, and a bronze cast would be purchased from them by Queen Mary.

His statue Aphrodite was exhibited in the Royal Academy in 1945. He would present it to the Richmond Council as a gift for the borough where he had spent his youth and met his wife. The sculpture would be placed in Terrace and Buccleuch Gardens to replace a 19th century cast-iron fountain. It would come to be known locally as "Bulbous Betty".
