= Fulcrum (sculpture) =

1987 sculpture by Richard Serra in London

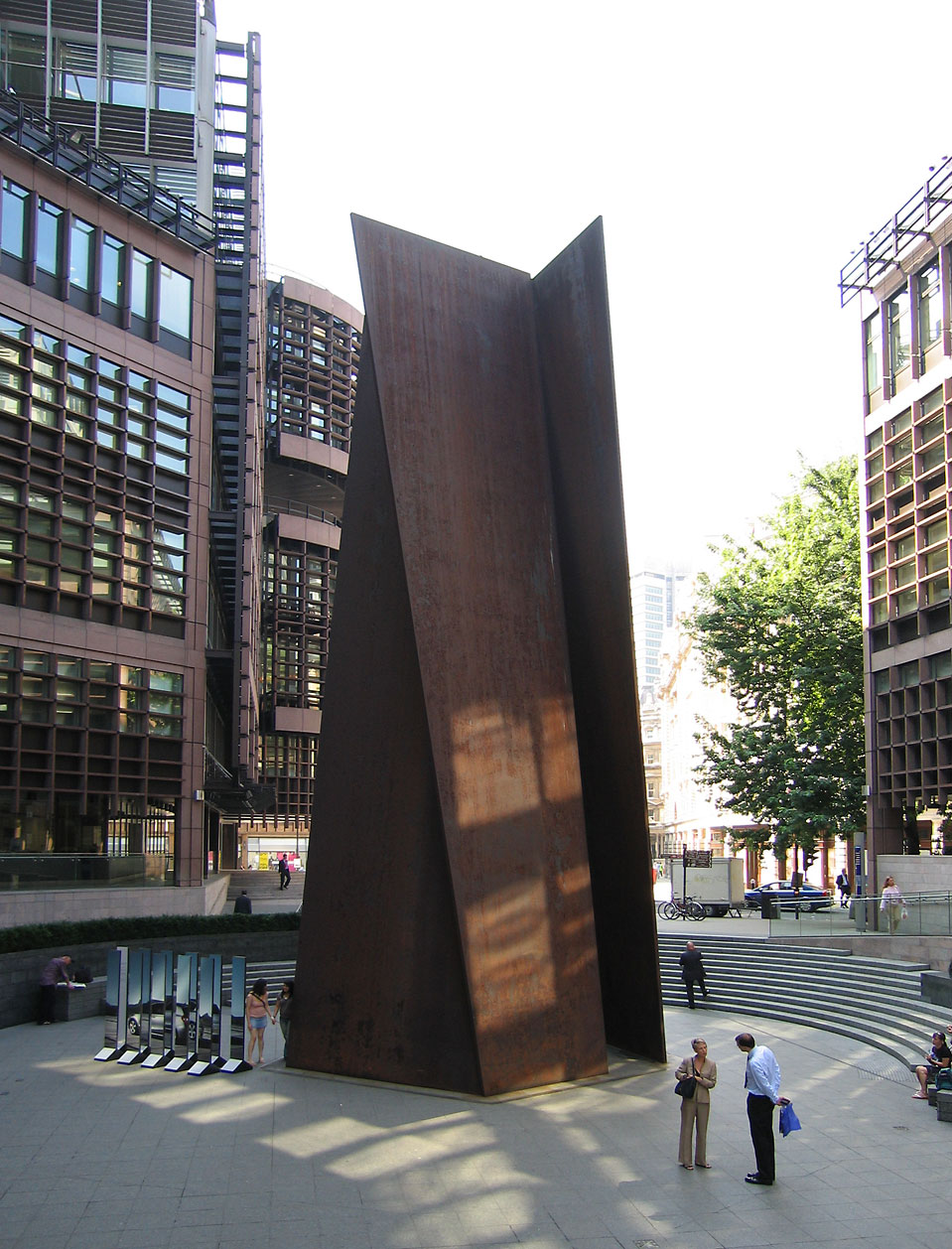
- Fulcrum pictured in 2005
- Artist: Richard Serra
- Type: Sculpture
- Medium: Weathering steel
- Dimensions: 1,700 cm (55 ft)
- Location: London; 51.518303°N 0.083741°W

Fulcrum is a large sculpture by American artist Richard Serra installed in 1987 near the western entrance to Liverpool Street station, London, as part of the Broadgate development. The sculpture consists of five pieces of Cor-Ten steel, and is approximately 55 feet (17 m) tall. Deyan Sudjic, director of the Design Museum, has called it one of London's "design icons".

As part of the redevelopment of 100 Liverpool Street, the sculpture had to be lowered by around 1.5 metres.
