= A Sculpture for Mary Wollstonecraft =

Public statue in Newington Green, London

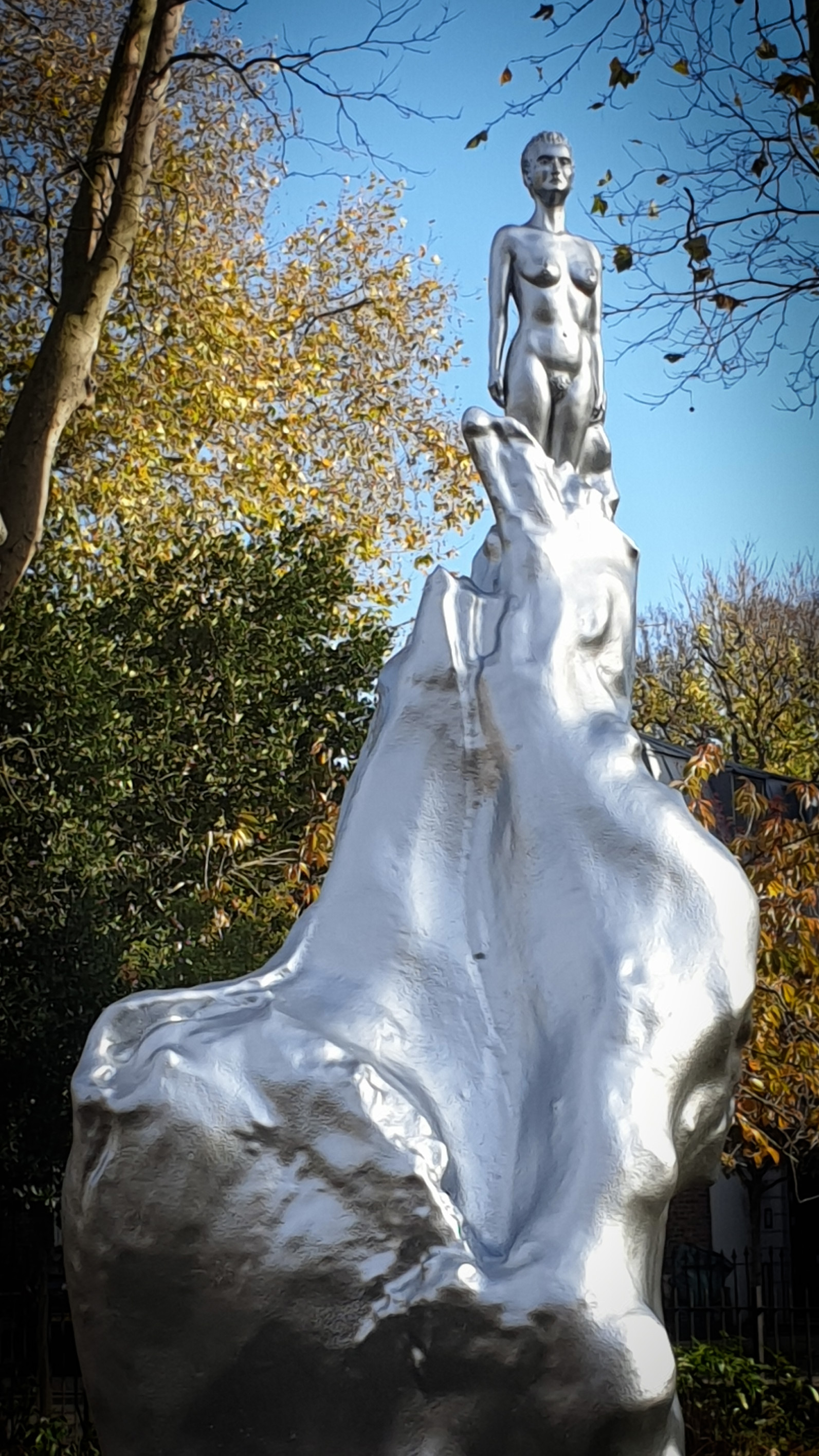
- Artist: Maggi Hambling
- Medium: Bronze, granite
- Subject: Mary Wollstonecraft
- Location: London, United Kingdom; 51.55153°N 0.08511°W

A Sculpture for Mary Wollstonecraft is a public sculpture commemorating the 18th-century feminist writer and advocate Mary Wollstonecraft in Newington Green, London. A work of the British artist Maggi Hambling, it was unveiled on 10 November 2020.

== Description ==
The work is a representation of a naked female figure, emerging out of organic matter which the BBC described as "a swirling mingle of female forms". Wollstonecraft's most famous quotation, "I do not wish women to have power over men but over themselves", is inscribed on the plinth. The sculpture is inspired by Wollstonecraft's claim to be "the first of a new genus".

The sculpture is sited opposite the Newington Green Unitarian Church that Wollstonecraft attended.

== Campaign for the sculpture ==
The "Mary on the Green" group was founded in 2010 to campaign and raise money for a statue of Wollstonecraft on Newington Green. The group reached its target of £143,300 in 2019. The campaign was chaired by Bee Rowlatt who is a writer and journalist. Rowlatt is also the founding trustee of the Wollstonecraft Society, a human rights education charity. Hambling was commissioned to create the work in 2018.

Hambling's design for the sculpture was selected unanimously by a panel of curators and the public, and chosen over the design of artist Martin Jennings.

== Reaction and commentary ==
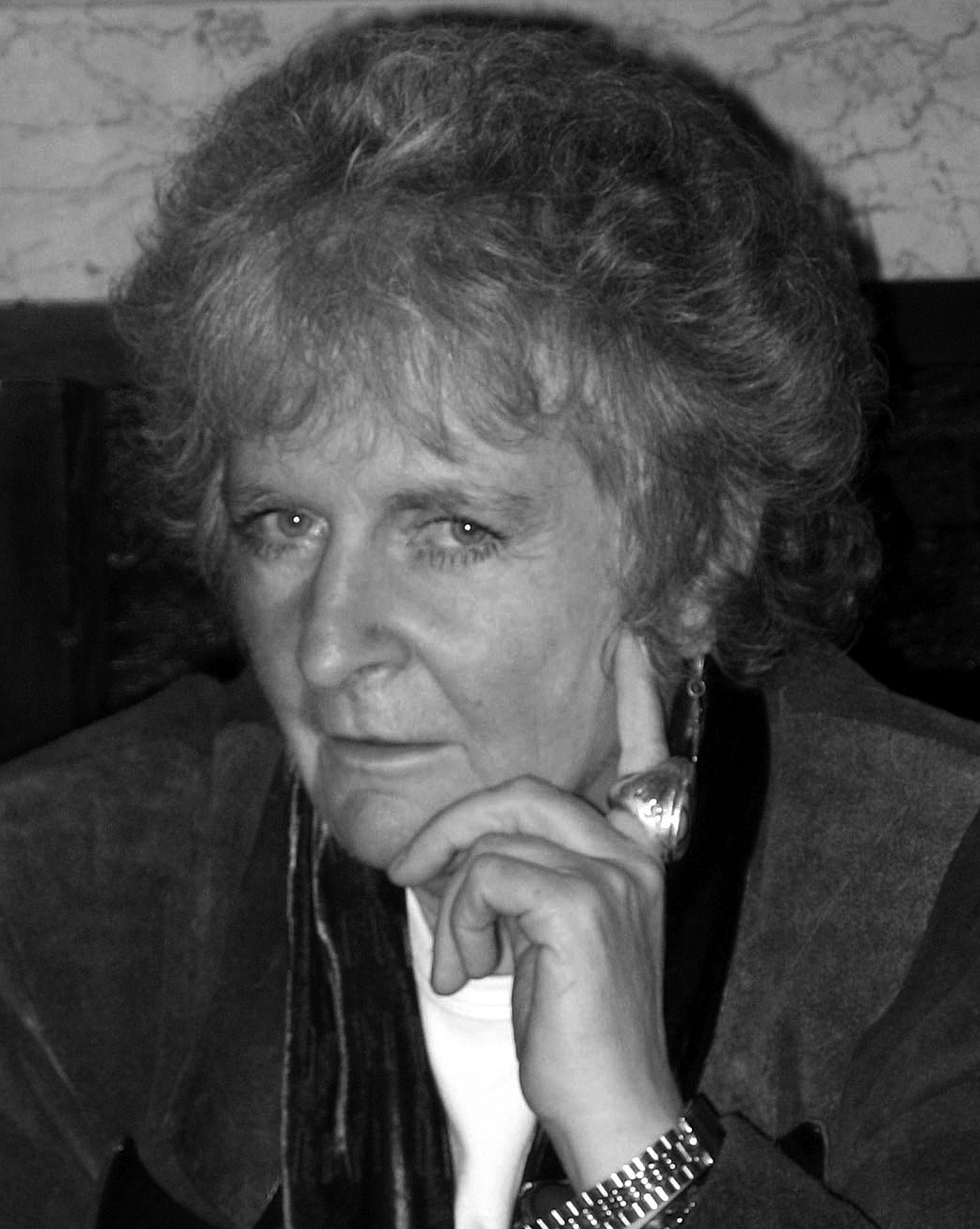
Hambling in 2006

Some critics perceived the figure as a depiction of Mary Wollstonecraft, however the campaign behind it describes it as "a sculpture of an idea". Hambling intended the figure to represent an everywoman, signifying the birth of the feminist movement, rather than Wollstonecraft herself. The campaign describes the sculpture's form as a deliberate opposition to "traditional male heroic statuary" of the Victorian era, instead showing a small figure who "has evolved organically from, is supported by, and does not forget, all her predecessors".

The sculpture was criticised for its depiction of nudity and objectification of the female form, with some considering it inappropriate to represent a feminist figure in such a light. Hambling defended her work by saying that the figure was not created in the historical likeness of Wollstonecraft, and that she felt as though "clothes would have restricted her. Statues in historic costume look like they belong to history because of their clothes. It's crucial that she is 'now'." Other hostile responses wrote that many personifications of pure womanhood already existed in classic statuary in various nameless angels or characters like Marianne, and that a new sculpture directly of a successful female figure such as Wollstonecraft would have been preferred rather than yet another abstract woman. Other criticisms simply thought that the sculpture was ugly and generic, making the figure come across as a blank robot.

A crowd-funded campaign was launched shortly following the reveal of Hambling's sculpture to create a statue based on Martin Jennings' alternate design.

== See also ==
- Emmeline and Christabel Pankhurst Memorial
- List of public art in the London Borough of Islington
- Statue of Millicent Fawcett
- Suffragette Memorial
