= 100 Liverpool Street =

Residential building in London

Coordinates: 51.518155°N 0.083130°W

General information
- Status: Completed
- Location: Broadgate, London
- Opened: 2020; 6 years ago
- Owner: British Land

Design and construction
- Architecture firm: Hopkins Architects
- Structural engineer: AKT II
- Main contractor: Sir Robert McAlpine

100 Liverpool Street is an office building in the City of London. Part of the Broadgate redevelopment, the original building was built in 1988. It was heavily rebuilt in 2020 with the façade completely changed. It is owned by British Land and the headquarters building of British bank Peel Hunt.

== History and description ==
1980s building seen in 2009

Redevelopment of Broadgate began in the 1980s with the building of several new office blocks on the site of the former Broad Street station and surrounding area. This included the building of 100 Liverpool Street in 1988, although it was largely rebuilt in 2020 by Hopkins Architects for British Land, owners of much of the estate. Sir Robert McAlpine served as the main contractors.

The refurbishment was praised for its aims at sustainable design, reusing elements of the old building and becoming British Land's first net zero development. The renovation won a number of awards including the RIBA's 2022 London Award, London Client Award, and National Award. It was also nominated for the 2022 Stirling Prize.

== See also ==
- 1 Finsbury Avenue
- 2 Finsbury Avenue
- 5 Broadgate
