= Los Mochis (restaurant) =

London-based restaurant

Restaurant information
- Owner: Markus Thesleff
- Head chef: Leonard Tanyag
- Food type: Mexican-Japanese Fusion
- Location: London, United Kingdom
- Website: www.losmochis.co.uk

Los Mochis is a London-based restaurant combining Japanese and Mexican cuisines, with locations in Notting Hill and the City of London. Los Mochis is owned by entrepreneur Markus Thesleff.

== History ==
Los Mochis opened its first restaurant in Notting Hill in May 2021. In April 2024, a second venue, Los Mochis London City, opened at 100 Liverpool Street in the Broadgate development.

In 2025, Los Mochis announced international expansion plans, with a location scheduled to open in Beverly Hills as part of the One Beverly Hills development.
