= Chiswick High Road =

Street in the London Borough of Hounslow

Coordinates: 51.492597°N 0.265292°W

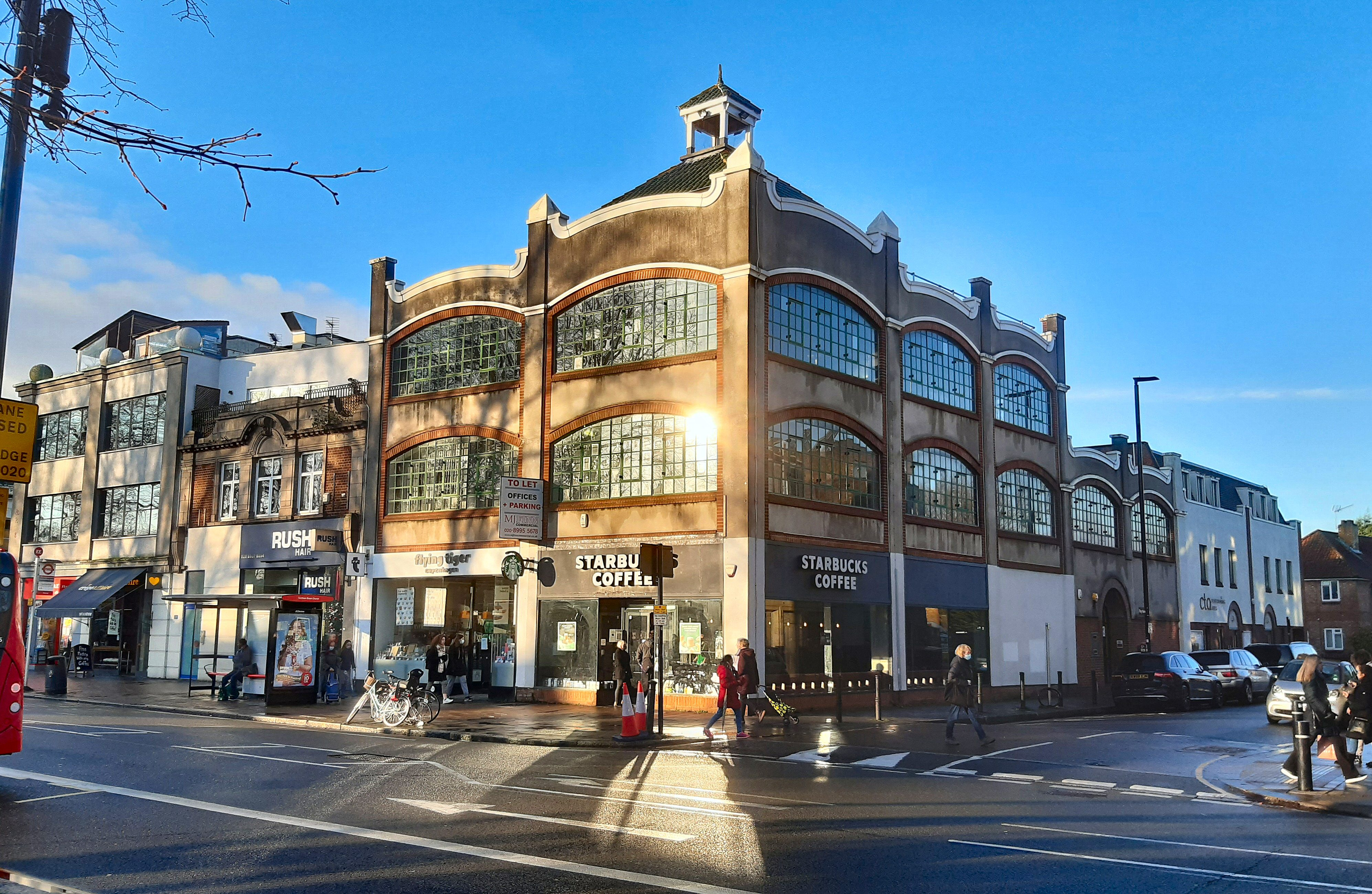
Shops on Chiswick High Road facing Turnham Green

Chiswick High Road is the principal shopping and dining street of Chiswick, a district in the west of London. It was part of the main Roman road running west out of London, and remained the main road until the 1950s when the A4 was built across Chiswick. By the 19th century the road through the village of Turnham Green had grand houses beside it. The road developed into a shopping centre when Chiswick became built up with new streets and housing to the north of Old Chiswick, late in the 19th century. There are several listed buildings including public houses, churches, and a former power station, built to supply electricity to the tram network.

== History ==
Chiswick High Road follows the alignment of the Roman road to Silchester as it leads west from London. Near the area of Turnham Green in Chiswick it was joined by another Roman road, which thus also followed part of the course of the High Road. The road continued to be London's main route west until the 1950s when the A4 dual carriageway was built further to the south across Chiswick.

In the English Civil War, the royalist forces under Prince Rupert, advancing on London from Oxford along the main road, were halted in a skirmish, the 1642 Battle of Turnham Green, by the forces of the Earl of Essex. The royalists withdrew, and never again threatened the capital.

Several large houses were built in Turnham Green along the High Road in the 17th century; John Bowack recorded in 1706 that the area had as many inhabitants as the old village of Chiswick, which is some way to the south of the High Road, on the river Thames. In the 18th century, the High Road between Acton Lane and Hammersmith was bordered "intermittently" with large detached houses.

The High Road was a toll road from 1717 until the abolition of tolls in 1872. Stage coaches served the road on the way to towns such as Bath and Exeter. Roadside inns for travellers included the Roebuck, and the Packhorse and Talbot.

In November 1805, Royal Navy Captain John Richards Lapenotière travelled Chiswick High Road on his journey from Falmouth to Whitehall to carry the news of the victory at the Battle of Trafalgar. In 1826, Thomas Griffiths Wainewright, in a story told by his biographers, poisoned his uncle George Edward Griffiths, (Note: George Griffiths was the son of Ralph Griffiths, who became rich from publishing the erotic novel Fanny Hill.) while living in the uncle's grand home, Linden House on the High Road. He inherited and sold the house, but it was insufficient to clear his debts. He was later convicted of forgery and transported to Tasmania.

In 2022, Chiswick High Road provided the basis for the local historian Wesley Henderson-Roe's British Association for Local History award-winning study of changes to shopping habits, based on surveys of the road's shops conducted in 1936 and 2020.

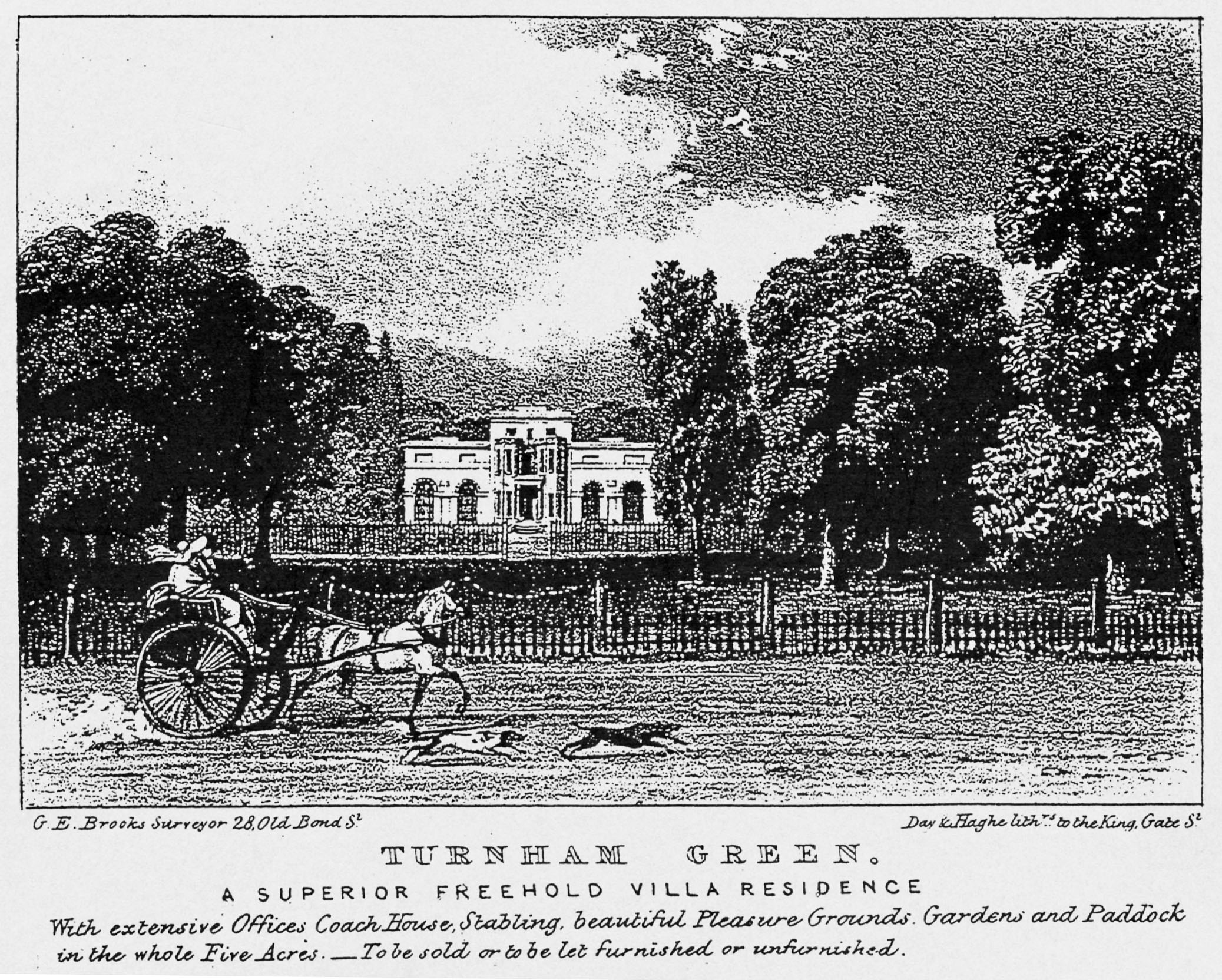
Sale of Linden House, 1831, by the notorious Thomas Griffiths Wainewright

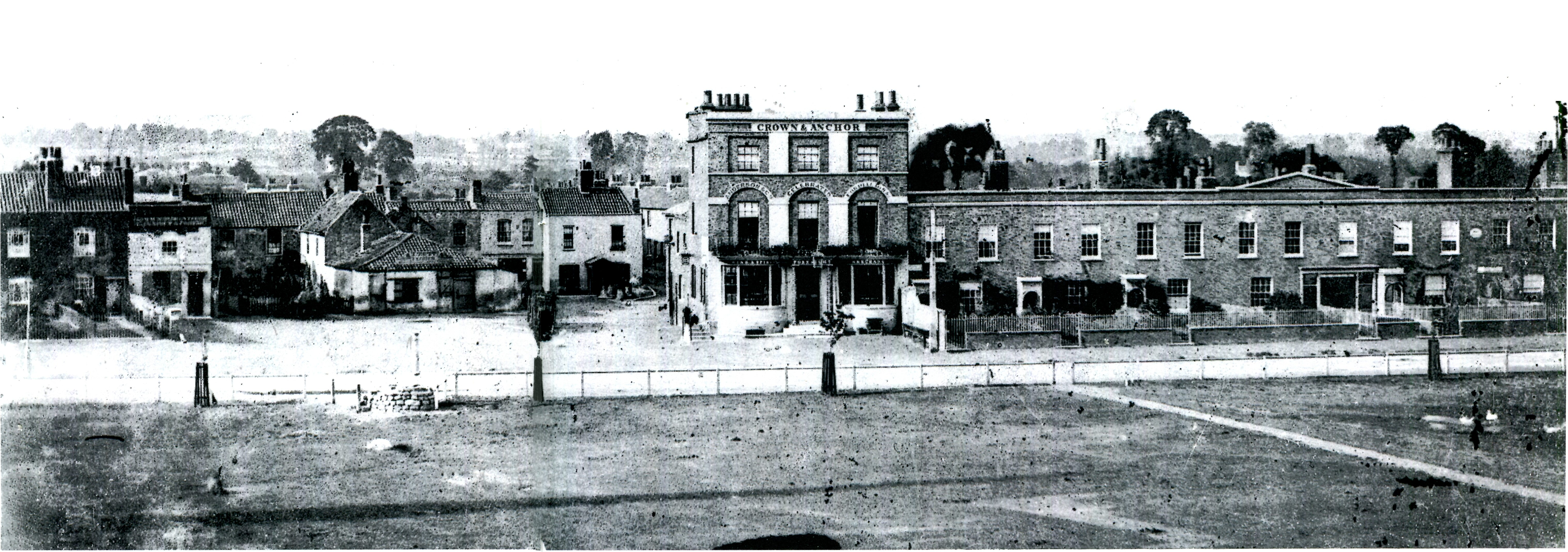
Turnham Green north side with smithy and Crown and Anchor pub (before it was rebuilt), 1863

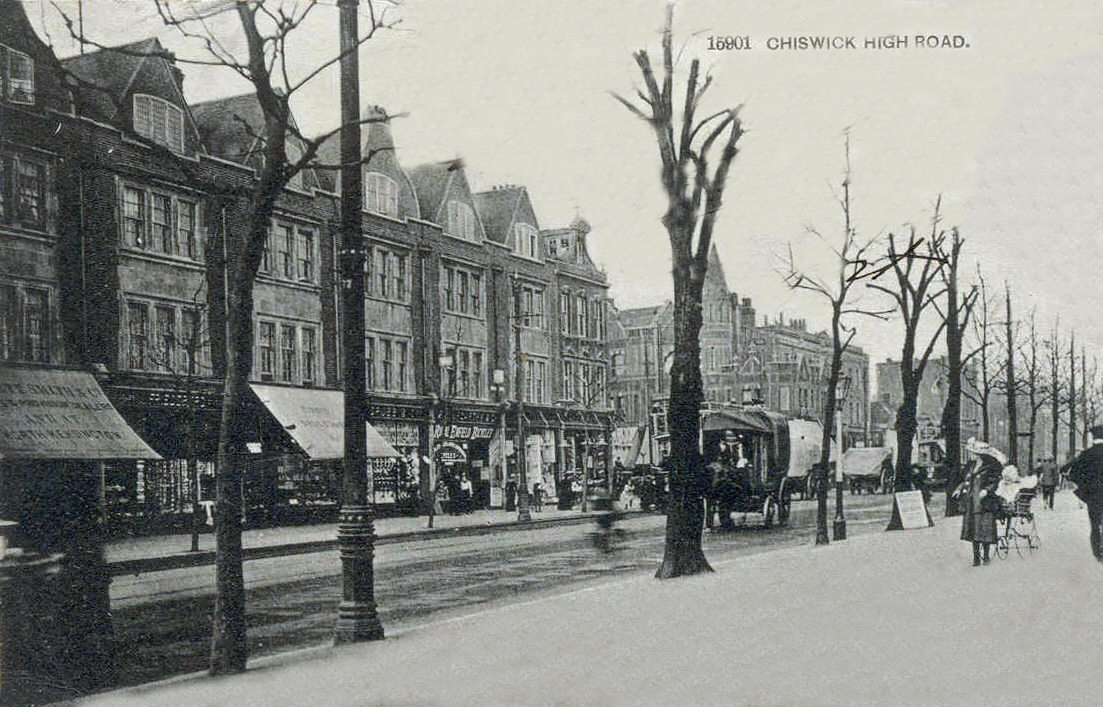
Chiswick High Road (to the junction with Goldhawk Road) and King Street, Hammersmith, late 19th century. The buildings on the left have survived.

== Street ==
Chiswick High Road runs the 2.6 kilometres (1.6 mi) from Kew Bridge northeastwards to Chiswick Roundabout, then eastwards through part of Gunnersbury to Turnham Green, and then across Chiswick to King Street, Hammersmith at the corner with Goldhawk Road. The section between Kew Bridge and Chiswick Roundabout is part of the A205 South Circular Road, while the rest of the street is part of the A315.

The street offers many restaurants, bars, and pubs; Time Out describes it as "an undeniably posh but very friendly bubble".

=== Gunnersbury ===
On the north of Chiswick High Road in Gunnersbury is the Chiswick Business Park, on the site of a former bus garage. It was designed in 1990–1991 by the architects Terry Farrell & Partners as a suitable backdrop for buildings by themselves, Foster Associates, and Peter Foggo around the main piazza, and others by Rogers Stirk Harbour + Partners and ABK Architects around a smaller square to one side.

On the south side is the 18-storey high BSI (British Standards Institution) tower, built above Gunnersbury station. Between 1966 and 1992 it was a headquarters of IBM UK. On the north side of this section of the High Road is The Gunnersbury, formerly the John Bull pub, built in 1853, with a billiards saloon built a little later. It became a music venue, visited by bands including The Who. The playwright Harold Pinter lived at no. 373, on the south side.

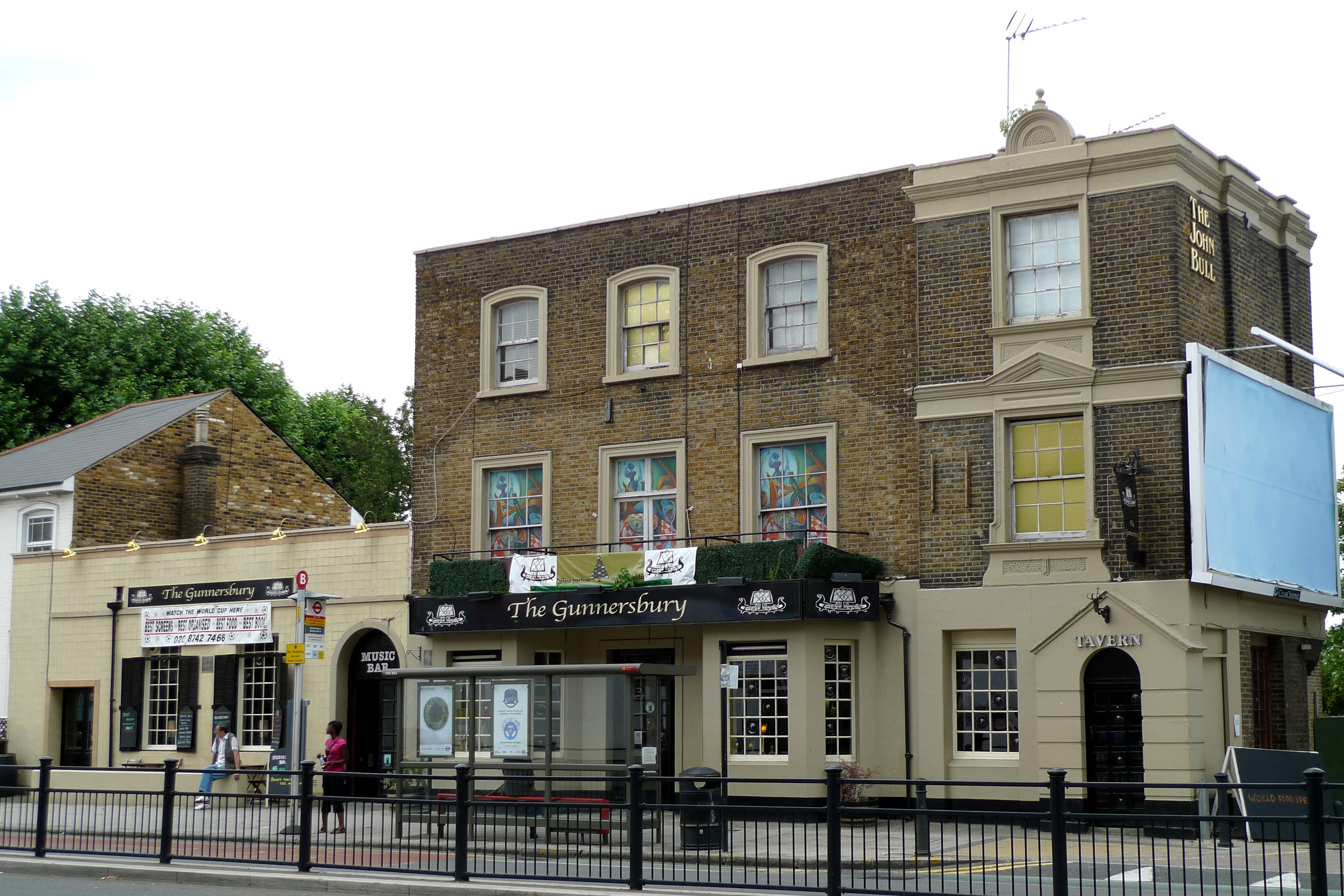
The Gunnersbury, formerly the John Bull music venue

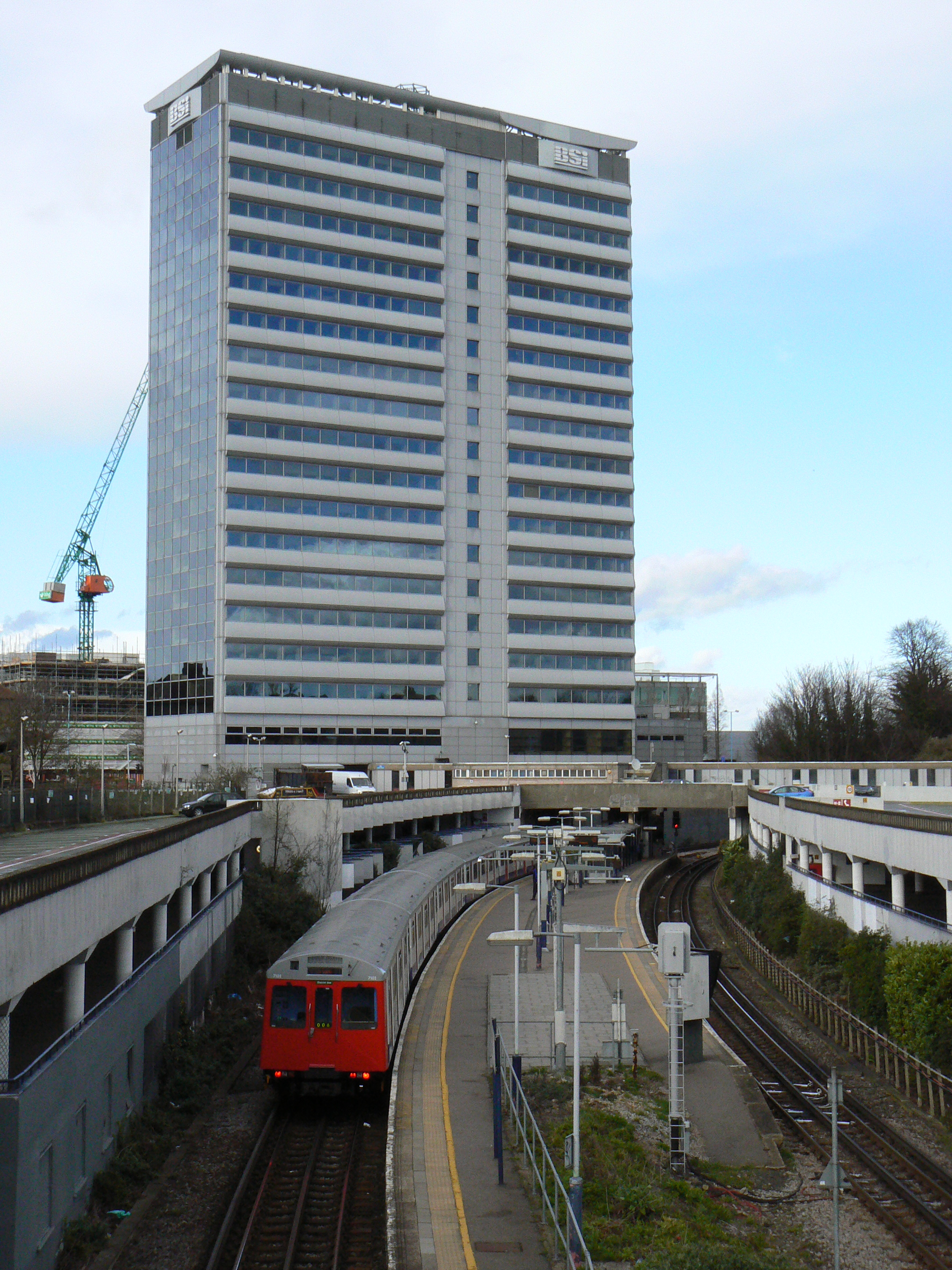
BSI tower, formerly IBM

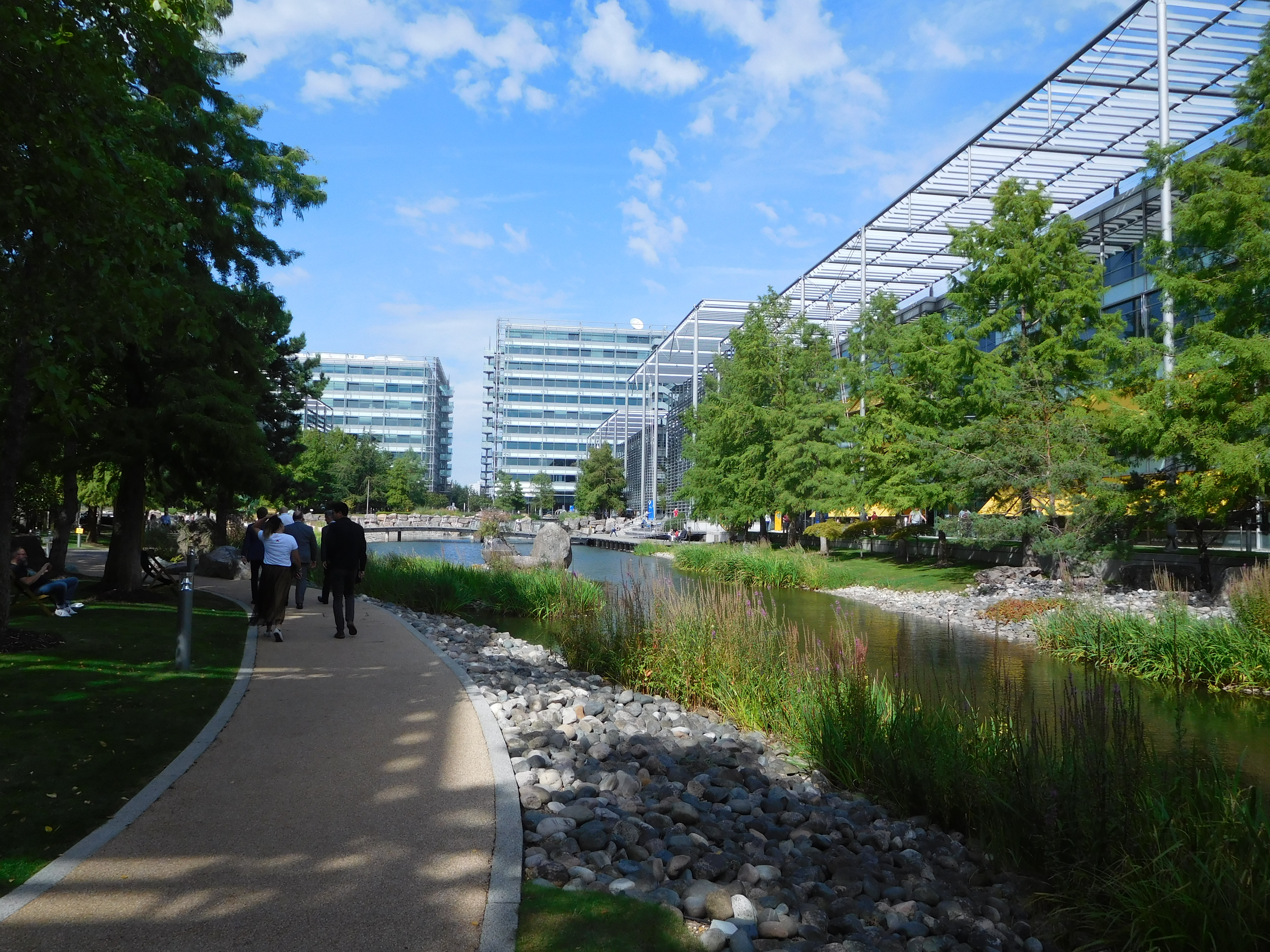
Chiswick Business Park
lake and landscaping

=== Facing Turnham Green ===
The 1910 Old Pack Horse is a Grade II listed public house on the corner of Chiswick High Road and Acton Lane, at the western end of Turnham Green common. The building historian Nikolaus Pevsner writes that it has "plenty of jolly terracotta detail and bowed ground-floor windows". The Chiswick Empire was a music hall theatre facing Turnham Green, opened in 1912 and demolished in 1959.

The Crown and Anchor pub, facing the common from the corner of the High Road and Belmont Road, is a Grade II listed early 19th-century building. It is of brown brick over three storeys with flat-arched double-hung sash windows. The ground floor is covered with late 19th-century tiles and plaques stating "Young and Co. Ales & Stouts". Above the corner doorway on the upper floors is a large round-arched plaque depicting a yellow-coloured ram for the Ram Brewery in Wandsworth.

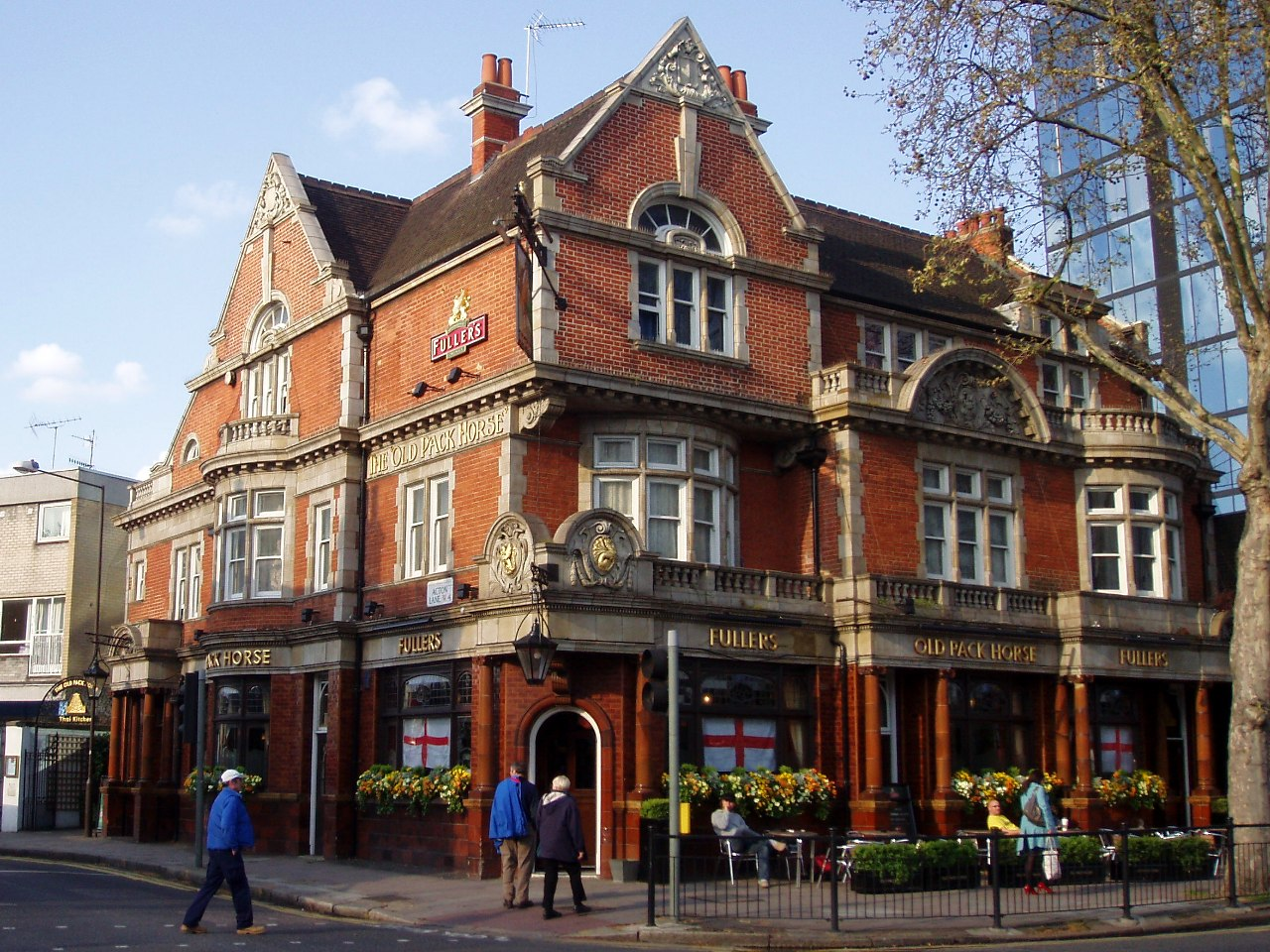
The Old Pack Horse

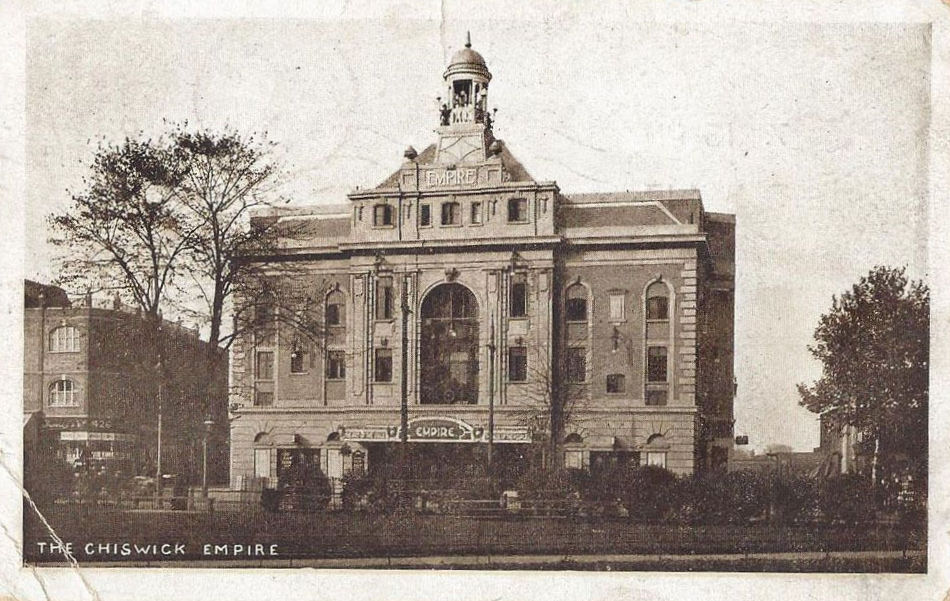
The Chiswick Empire in 1913

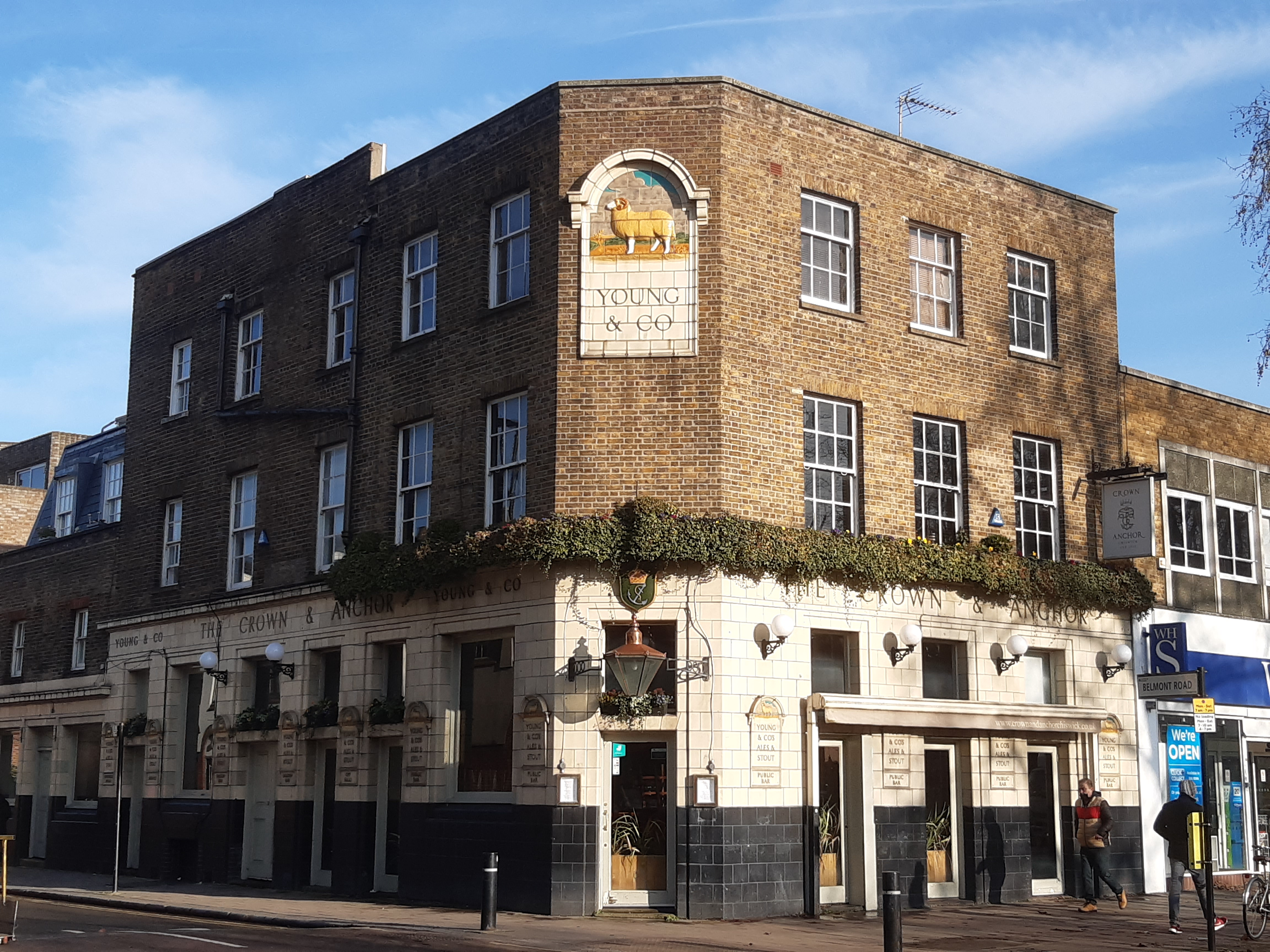
The Crown and Anchor

=== On Turnham Green common ===
The Grade II listed Victorian era Christ Church, Turnham Green, in the middle of the common to the south of the High Road, was designed by George Gilbert Scott. It was completed in 1843 as a short five-sided chancel with an apse, in the "early English lancet style" with a tall spire. It was extended in length by James Brooks in 1887 to provide a square eastern end.

The eastern tip of the common, where Heathfield Terrace joins the High Road, is marked by the Chiswick War Memorial, built in 1921. It too is Grade II listed, both for its historic and for its architectural interest. It is an obelisk designed by Edward Willis, the council's engineer and architect.

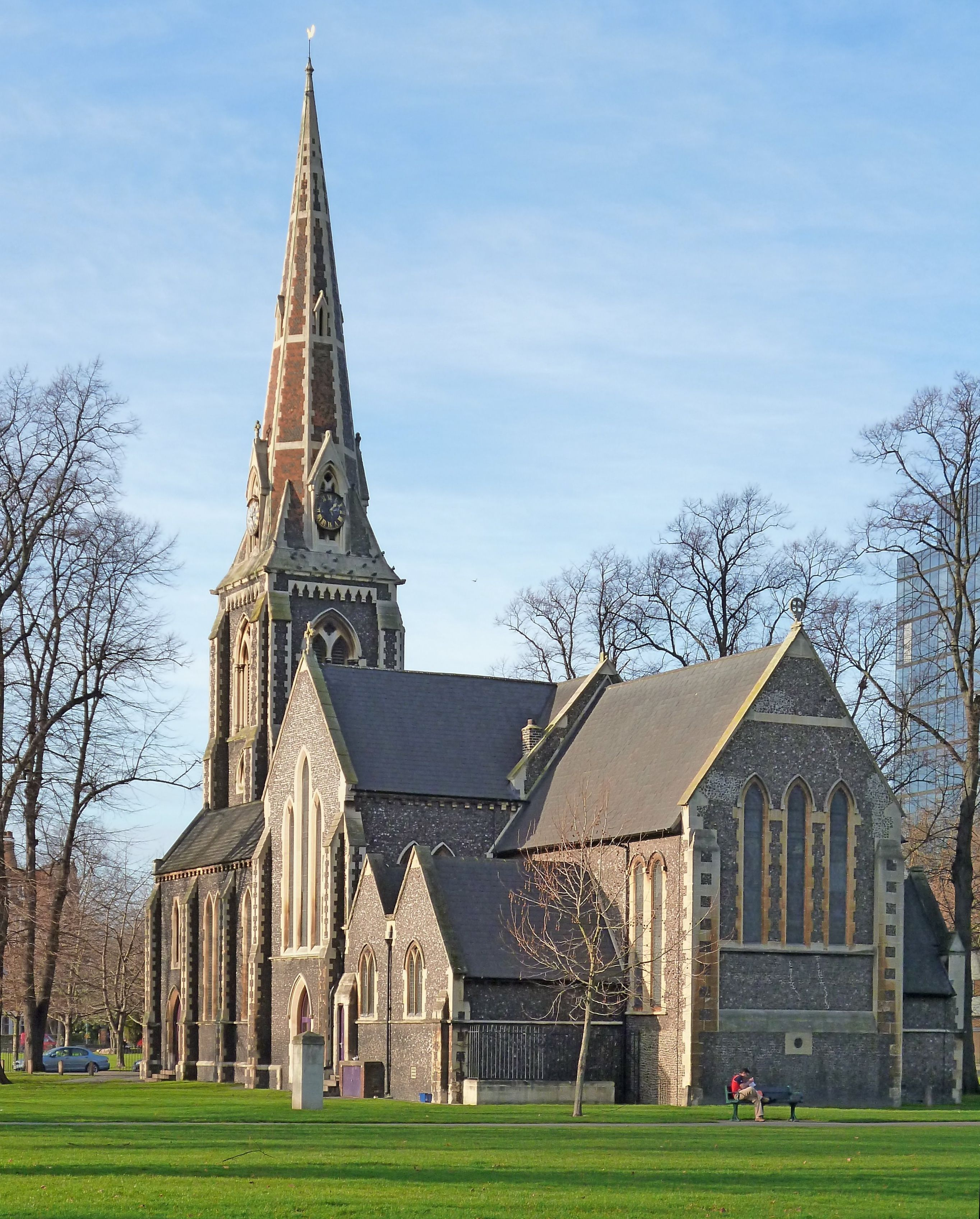
Christ Church,
Turnham Green

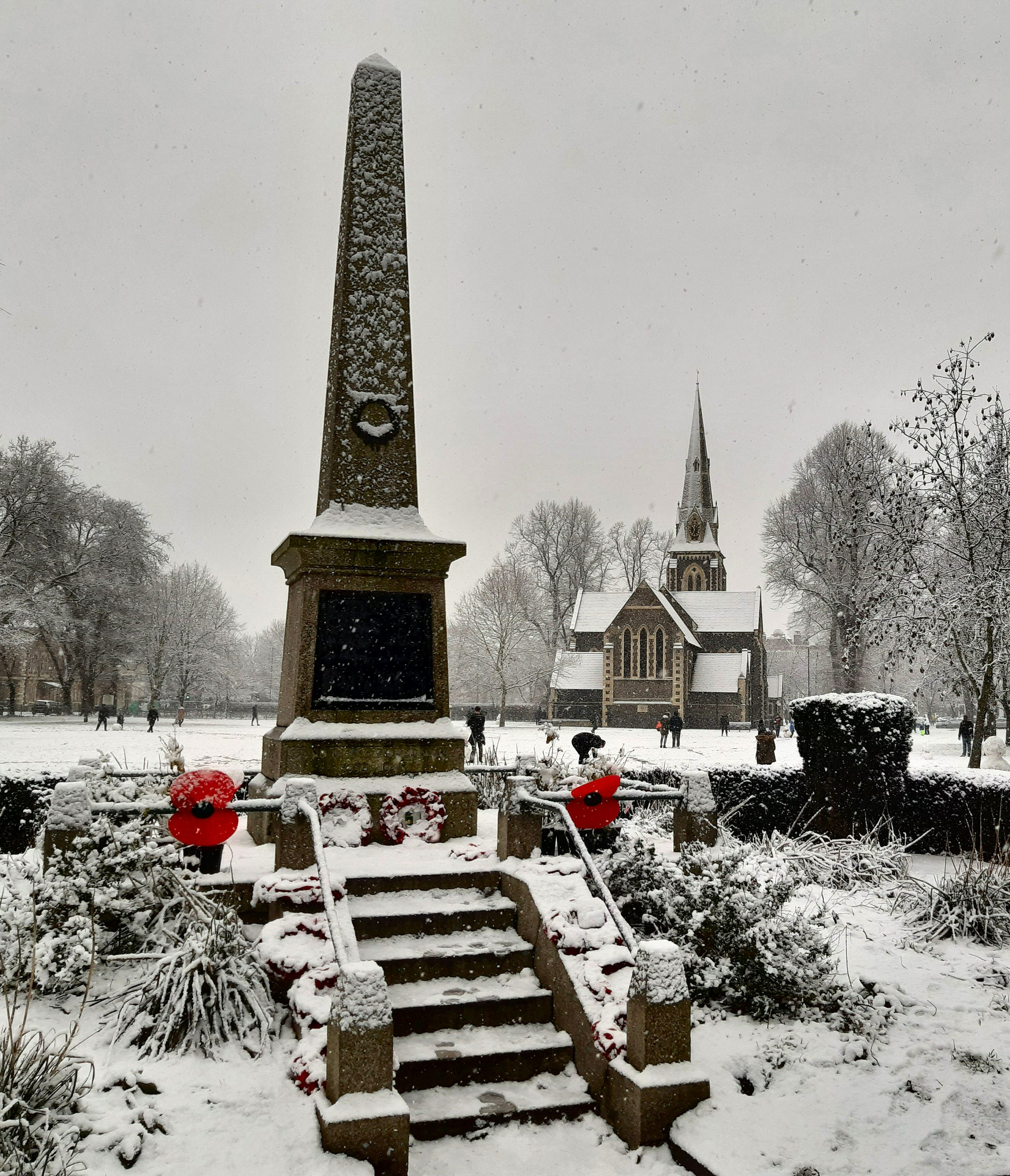
Chiswick War Memorial
in snow

=== Heathfield Terrace to Chiswick Lane ===
The Old Fire Station on the south side of Chiswick High Road was purpose-built in 1891. In 1911, it was equipped with a motor fire escape and ambulance, allowing it to claim it was one of the best in London. The building was provided with a tall tower to hang up the leather hosepipes to dry. Its façade is decorated with a carving of a fireman's helmet. It closed in 1963, the station moving to new premises on Heathfield Terrace. The old station has since been used as a restaurant.

Chiswick's old police station was built on the corner with Windmill Place in 1871. In 1890 it held 73 policemen; by 1926, the total had risen to 126. It was closed in 1972 when the police station moved across the road to a new building. The old station served as Carvosso's restaurant, then as the Crown restaurant, and from July 2024 as the Hound pub with traditional pub food such as Scotch eggs, pies, and fish and chips.

In 2001, a statue of the painter William Hogarth with his dog Trump, made by Jim Mathieson, was unveiled on the High Road, not far from Hogarth's House, where he lived from 1749 until his death in 1764.

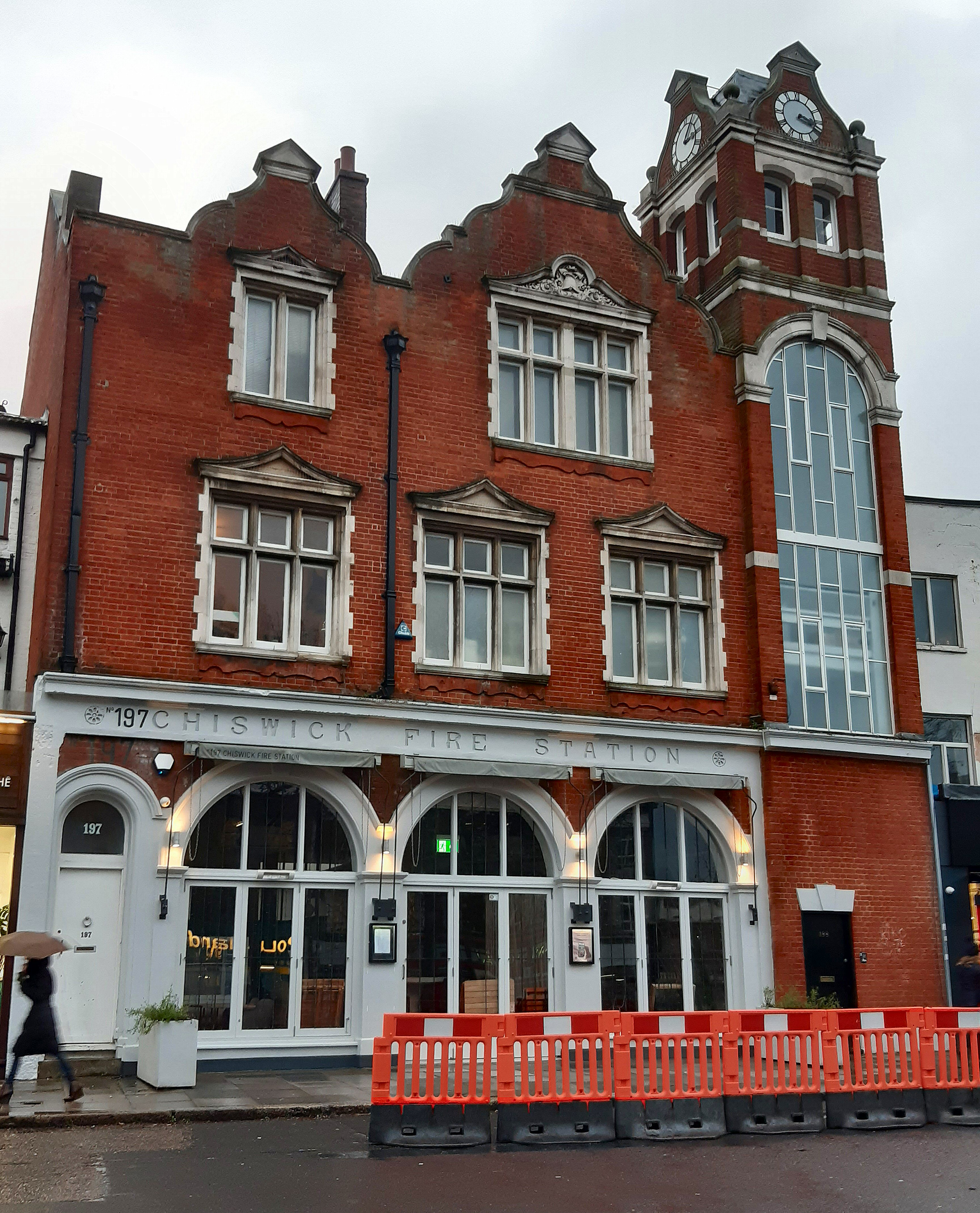
Old Fire Station, built 1891, as a restaurant

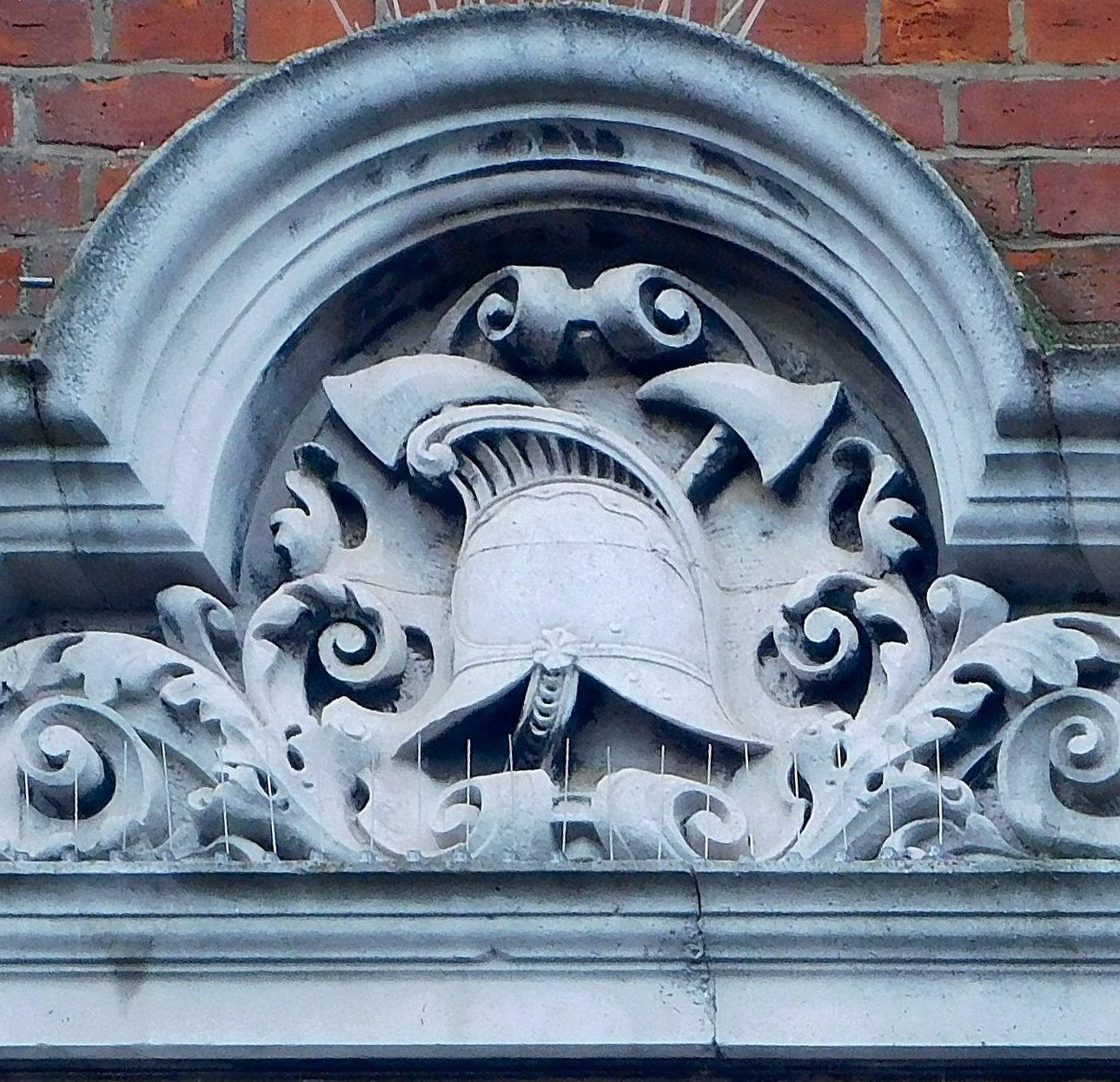
Sculpture on Old Fire Station

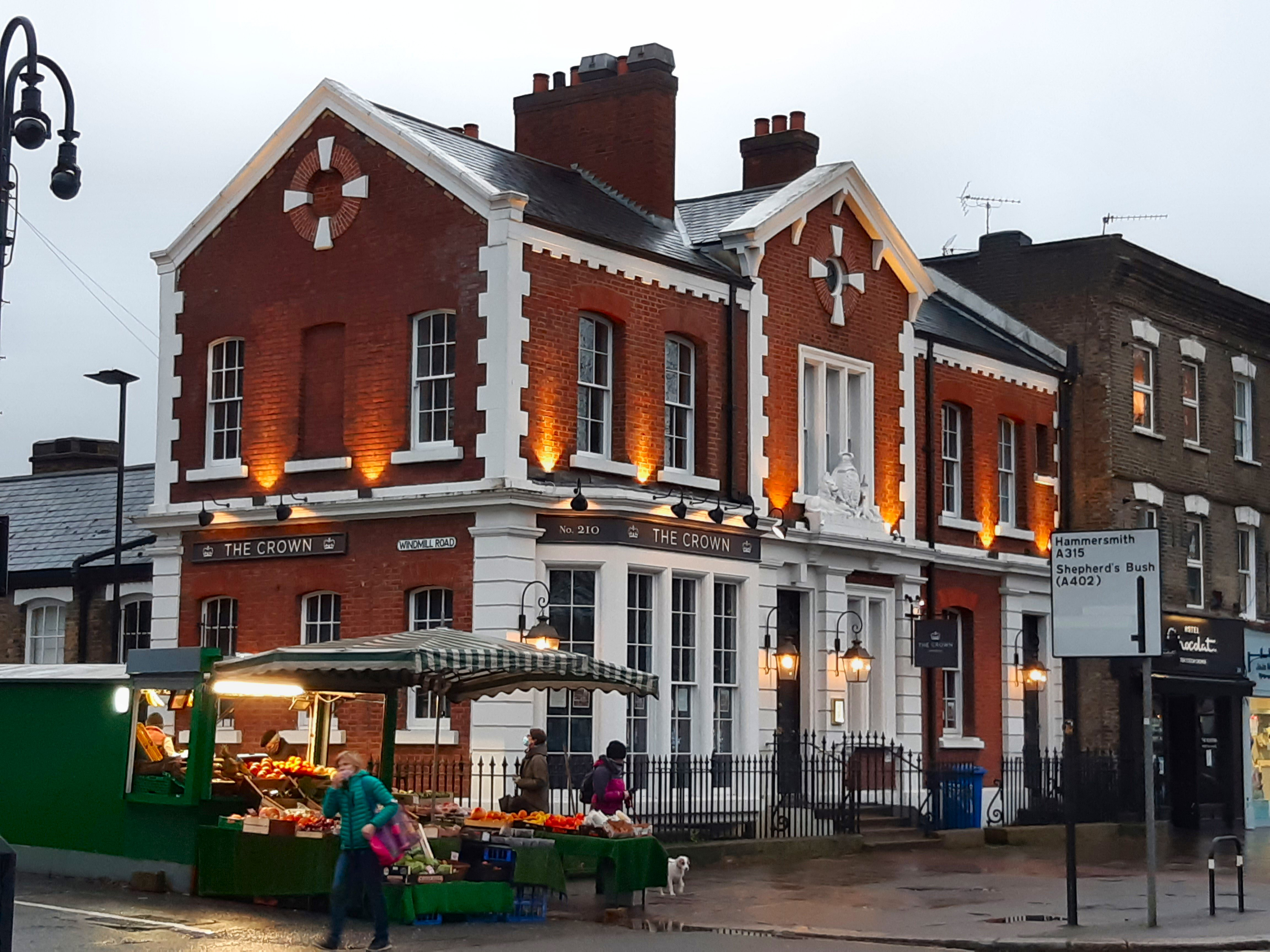
The old police station, built 1871,
as a restaurant

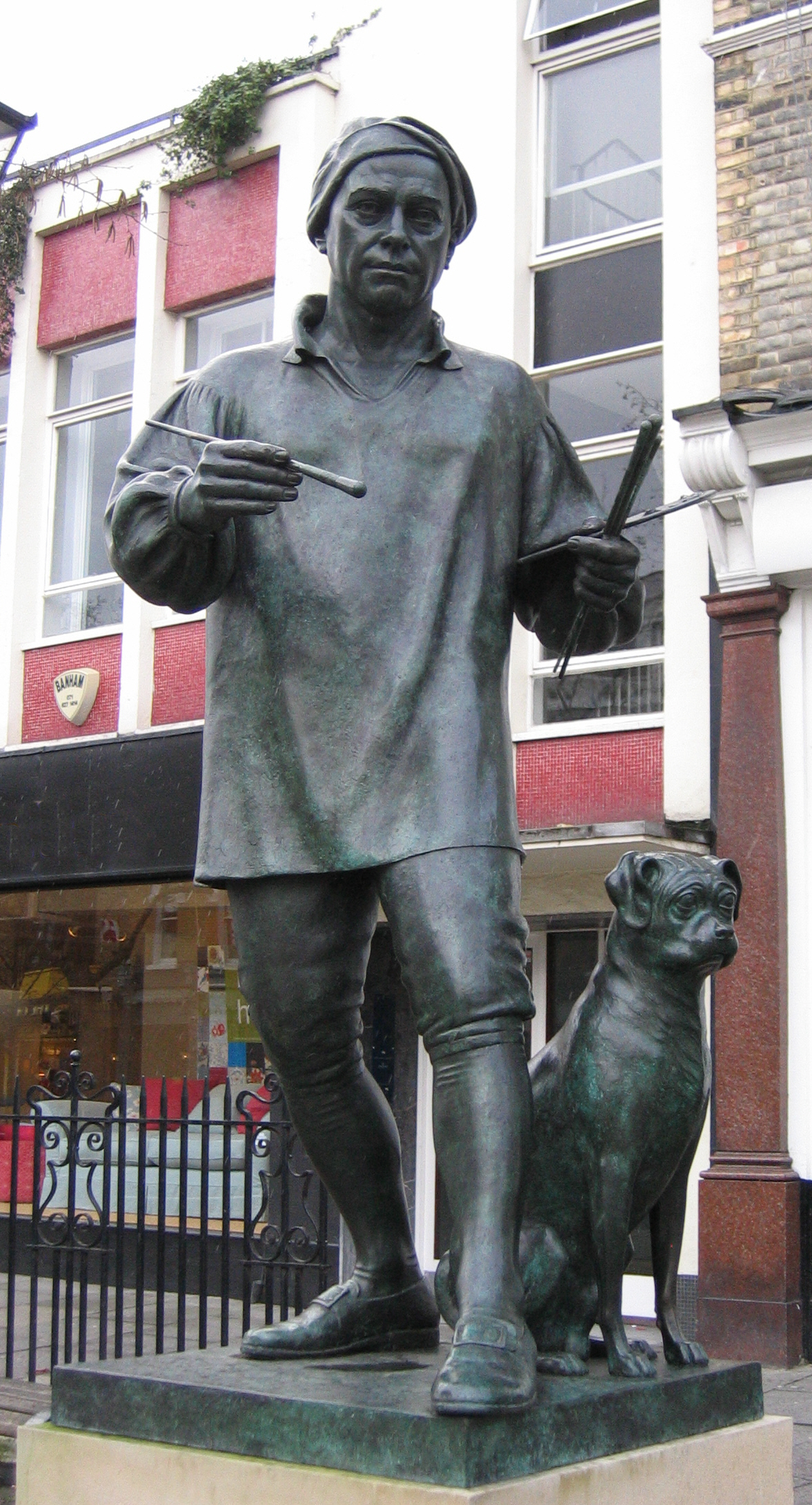
Statue of William Hogarth, 2001

The 1886 Roman Catholic Church of Our Lady of Grace and St Edward stands on the south side of the High Road, on the corner with Duke's Avenue. It is a red brick basilica by the architects Kelly and Birchall. The main door, with a round pediment, faces the High Road. There is no apse; the side walls are stepped. The ground floor is designed with intentionally blind window panels. The building is ornamented with substantial amounts of moulded and rubbed brick and terracotta decoration. The tall rectangular yellow-brown brick bell-tower was added by Giles Gilbert Scott in 1930; a rather more ornate tower was included in the original plans. The roof is covered with pantiles. Next to it on the High Road is the 18th century Presbytery of brown brick with Coade stone details, three storeys with double-hung sash windows; both buildings are Grade II listed.

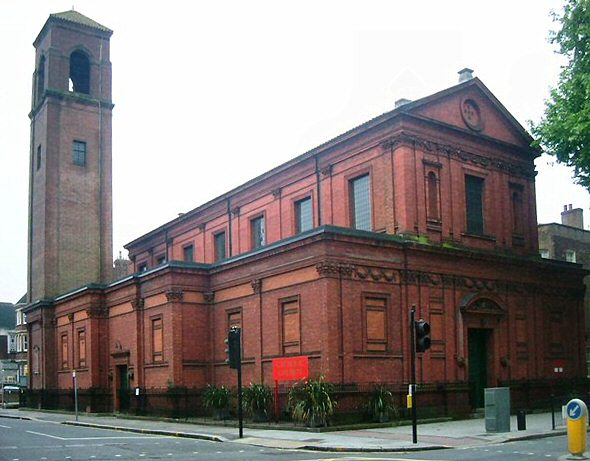
Our Lady of Grace and St Edward, 1886, tower added in 1930

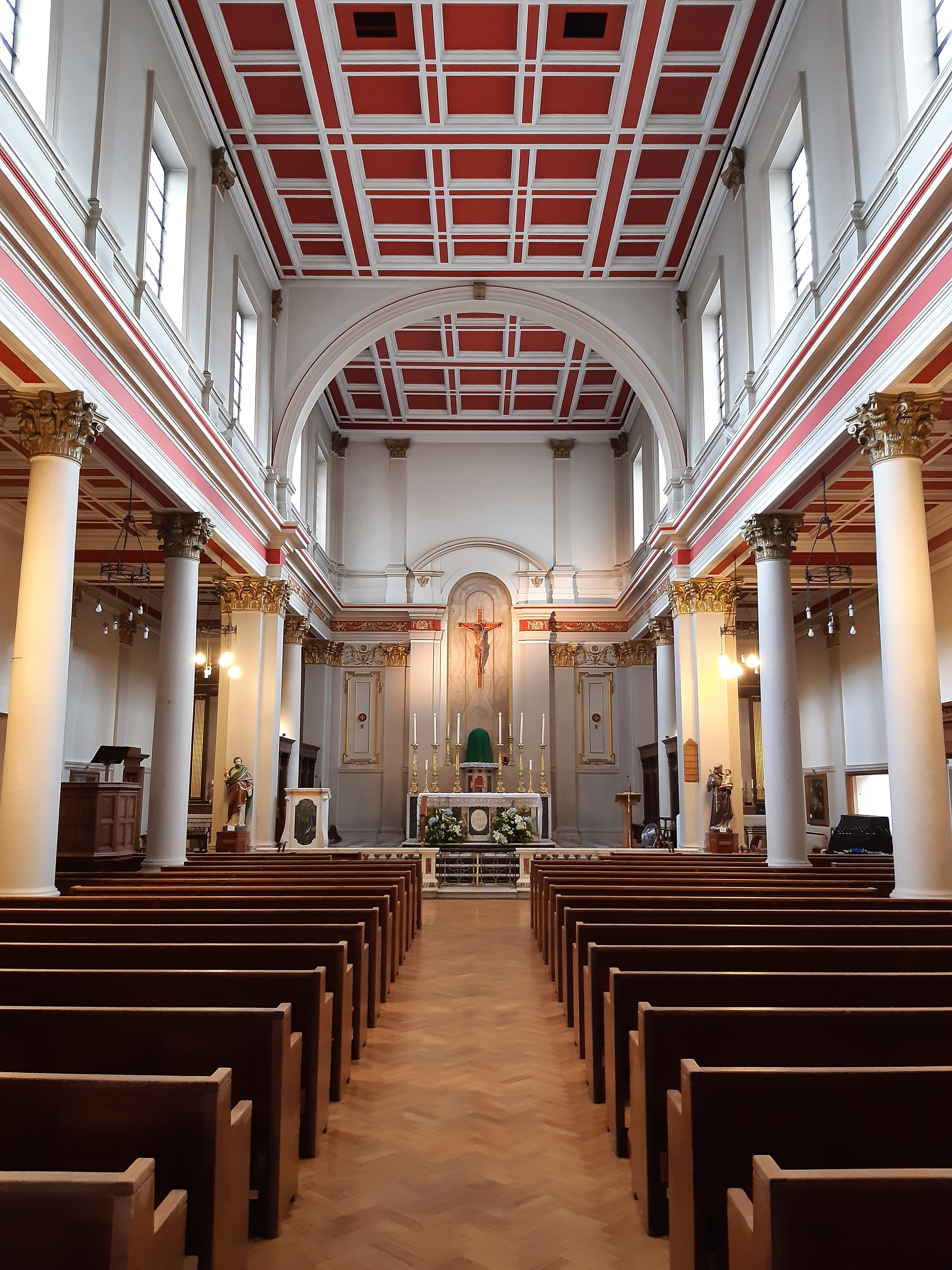
Our Lady of Grace and St Edward, interior

The High Road has for centuries provided ample inns to refresh thirsty travellers. The Roebuck, the Barley Mow and the Coach & Horses were all licensed drinking premises in the 18th century; by the 1820s, some were able to book stage coaches for their guests. The Roebuck was briefly renamed to the 'Rat and Parrot' in the 1990s; the present building, from 1895 replacing an earlier structure, is decorated with stucco and relief statues of stags on its front and side pediments. The George IV was already licensed in 1771, then called Lord Boston's Arms; Fuller, Smith and Turner bought and renamed it in 1826, and rebuilt it in 1931–32.

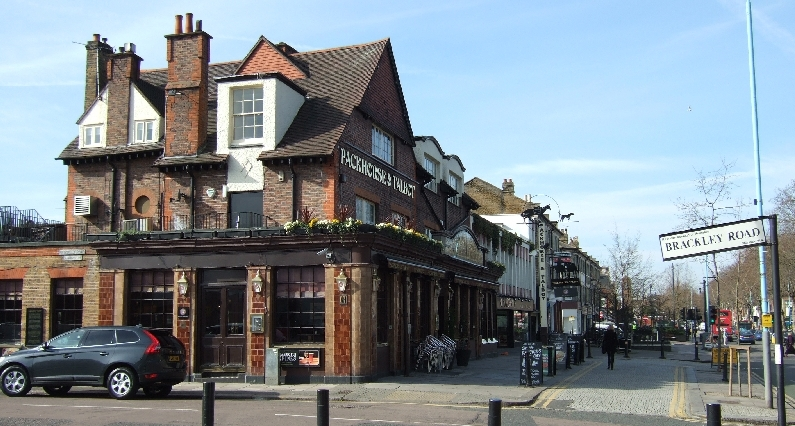
Packhorse and Talbot Inn, the wide pavement (right) indicating the old market place

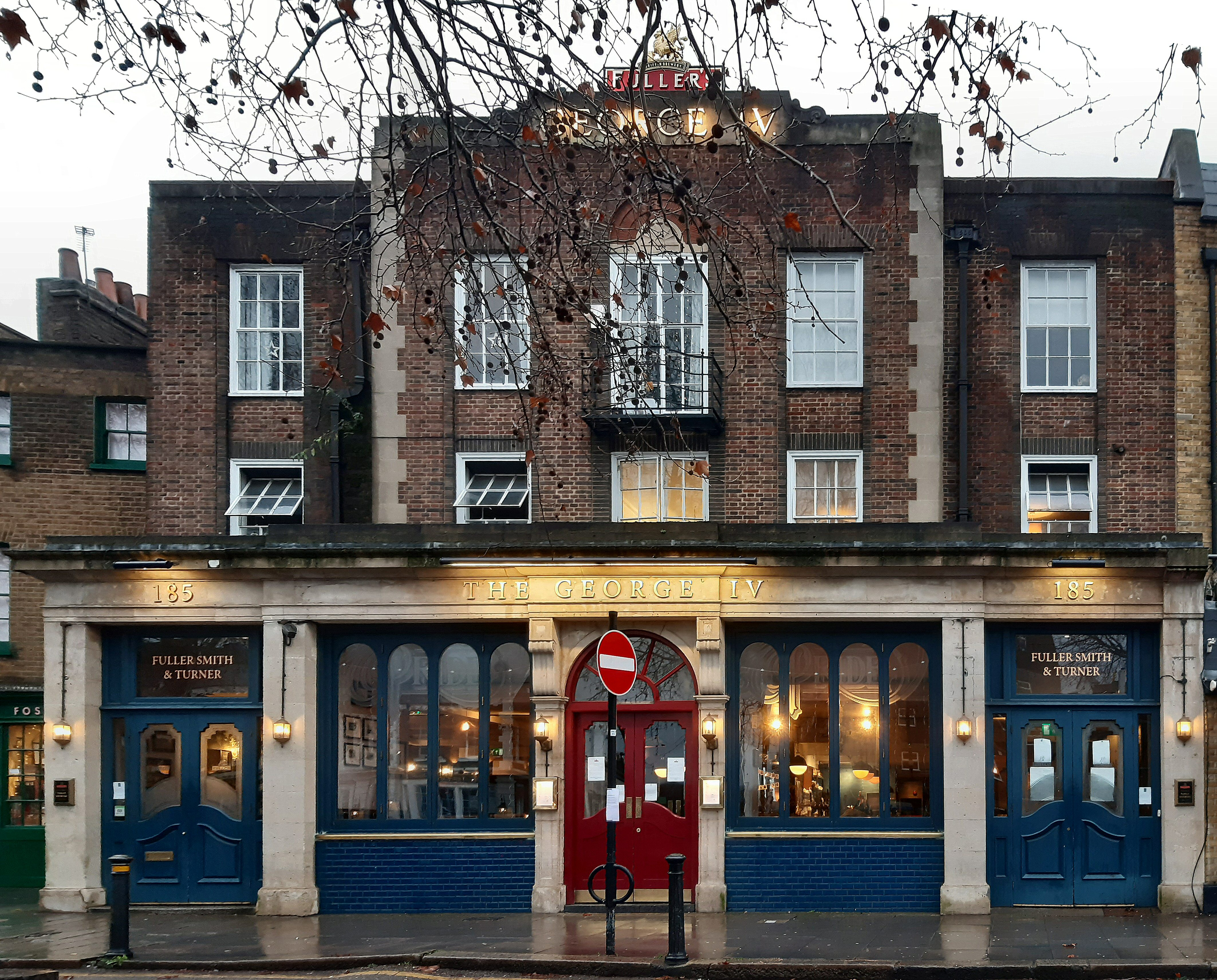
The George IV, 1931–32, replacing an earlier pub

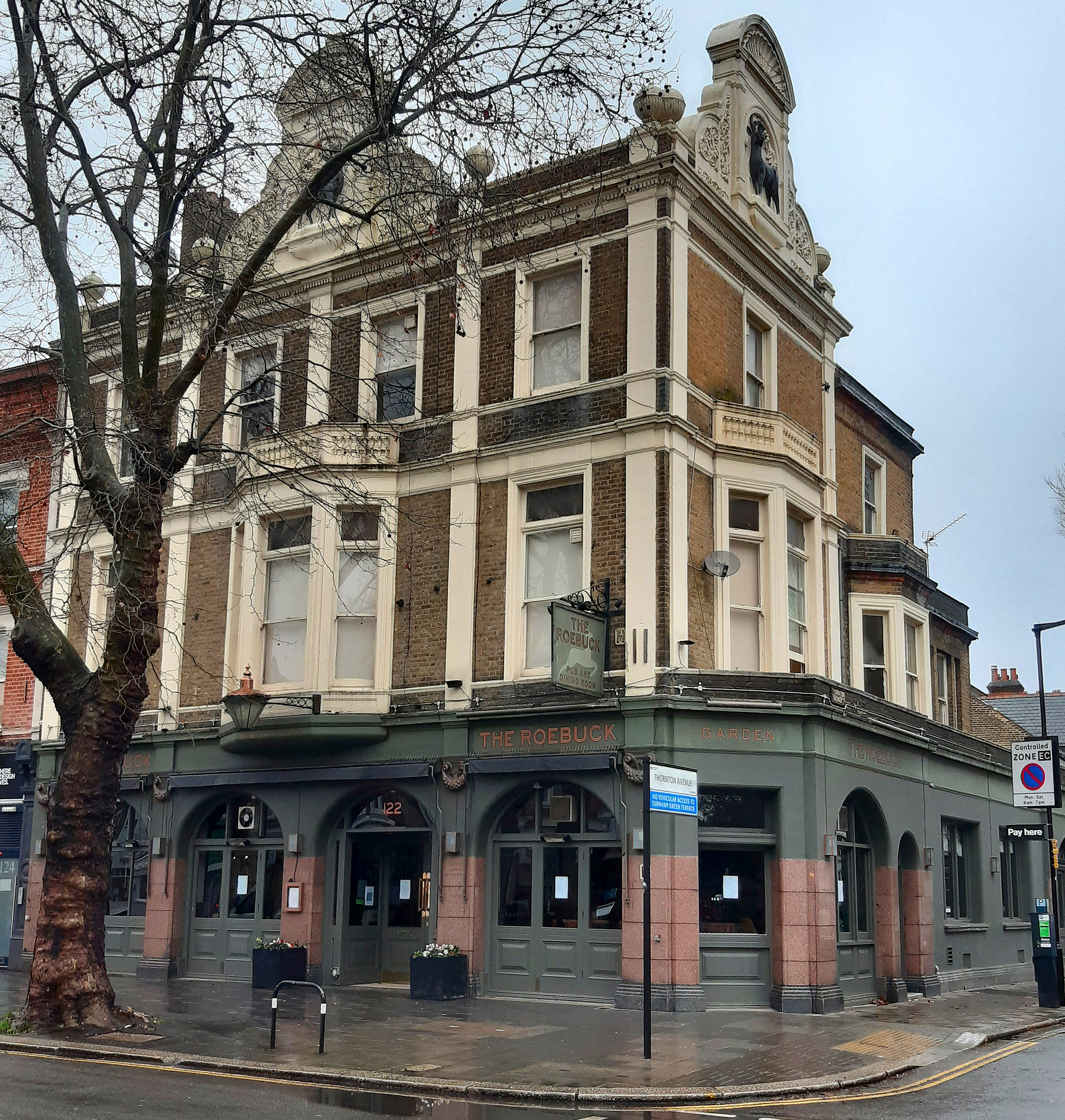
The Roebuck, 1895,
replacing an earlier inn

=== Barley Mow Passage and Bourne Place ===
Just off Chiswick High Road and parallel to it is Bourne Place, with the sole surviving large detached house of those along the High Road in the 18th and 19th centuries. Afton House, since 1919 the Chiswick Memorial Club, is a Grade II listed building, built circa 1800. It is in brown brick with five bays of double-hung sash windows over four floors; the ground floor and entrance are stuccoed. Its large front garden has been replaced by buildings along the south side of the High Road.

Leading westwards from Bourne Place is the narrow Barley Mow Passage, still with an industrial air. The Sanderson factory building now known as Voysey House was designed by the architect Charles Voysey in 1902. It is faced in white glazed brick, with Staffordshire blue bricks (now painted black) forming horizontal bands, with the plinth, surrounds for door and window openings, and dressings in Portland stone. It was originally a wallpaper printing works, now used as office space. It is Grade II* listed. It faces the main Devonshire Works building, and was once joined to it by a bridge across the road. It was Voysey's only industrial building, and is considered an "important Arts and Crafts factory building". In 2024, Sanderson's announced they were moving their headquarters back to Voysey House.

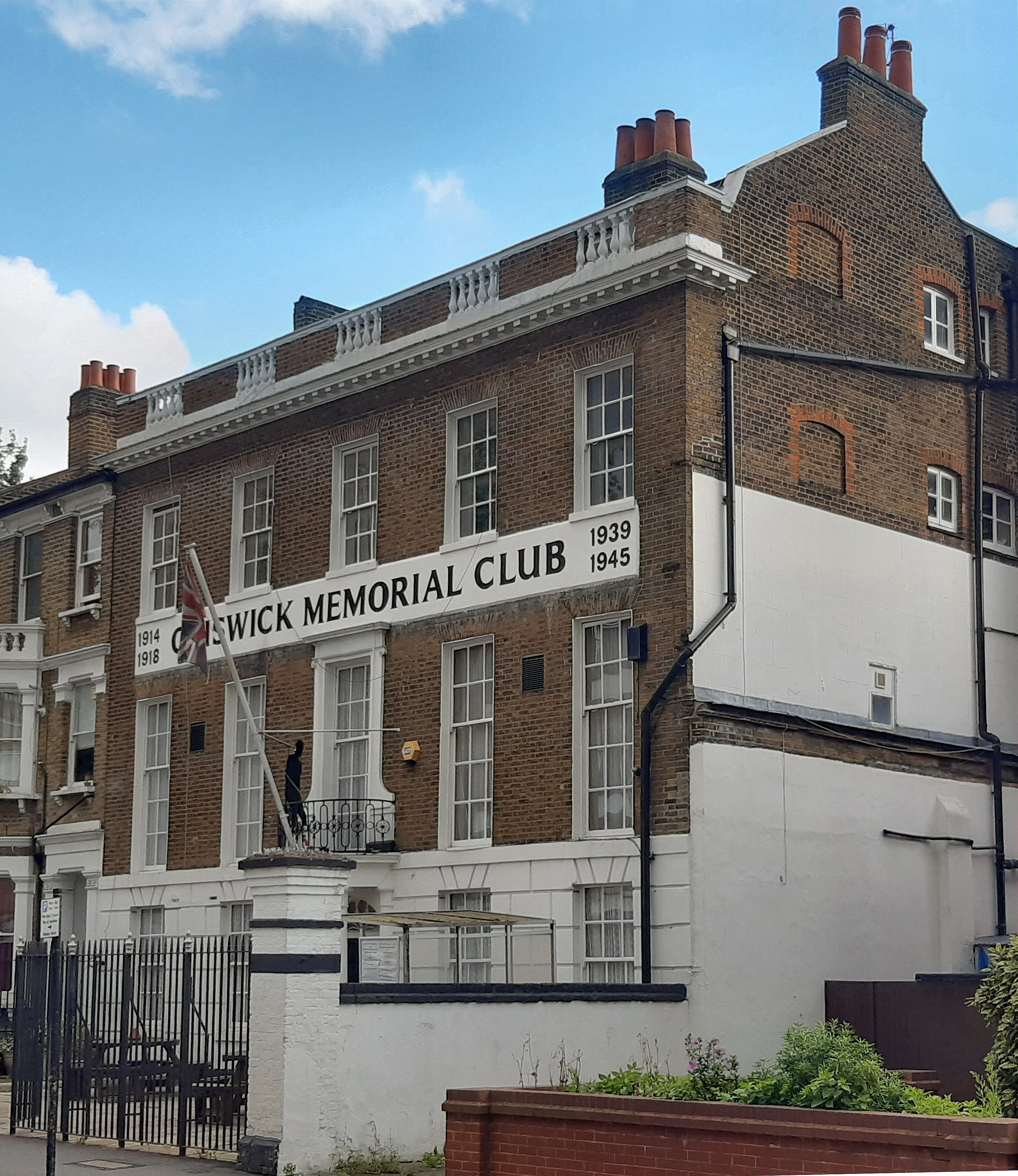
Afton House, Bourne Place: its front garden once stretched to the High Road.

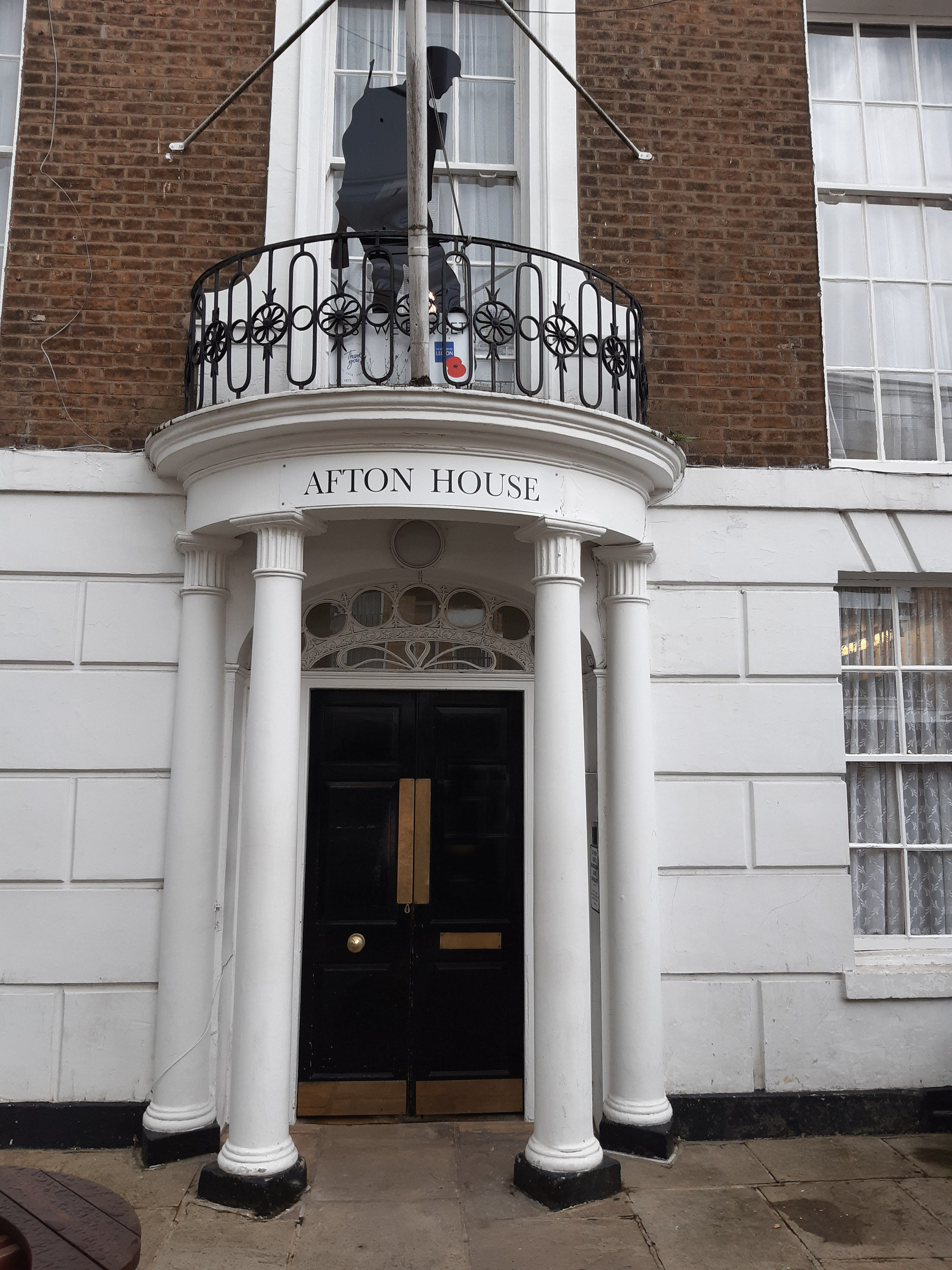
Afton House's doorway

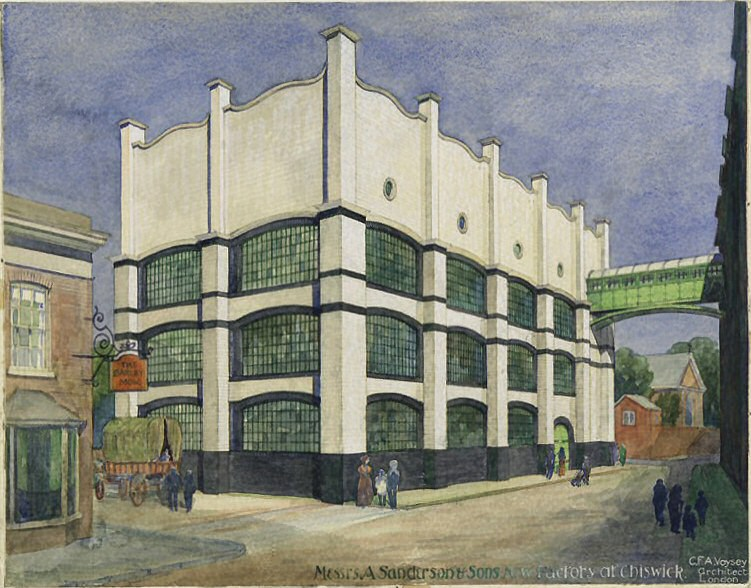
Voysey House industrial building design by Charles Voysey, 1902, showing the bridge that once spanned Barley Mow Passage

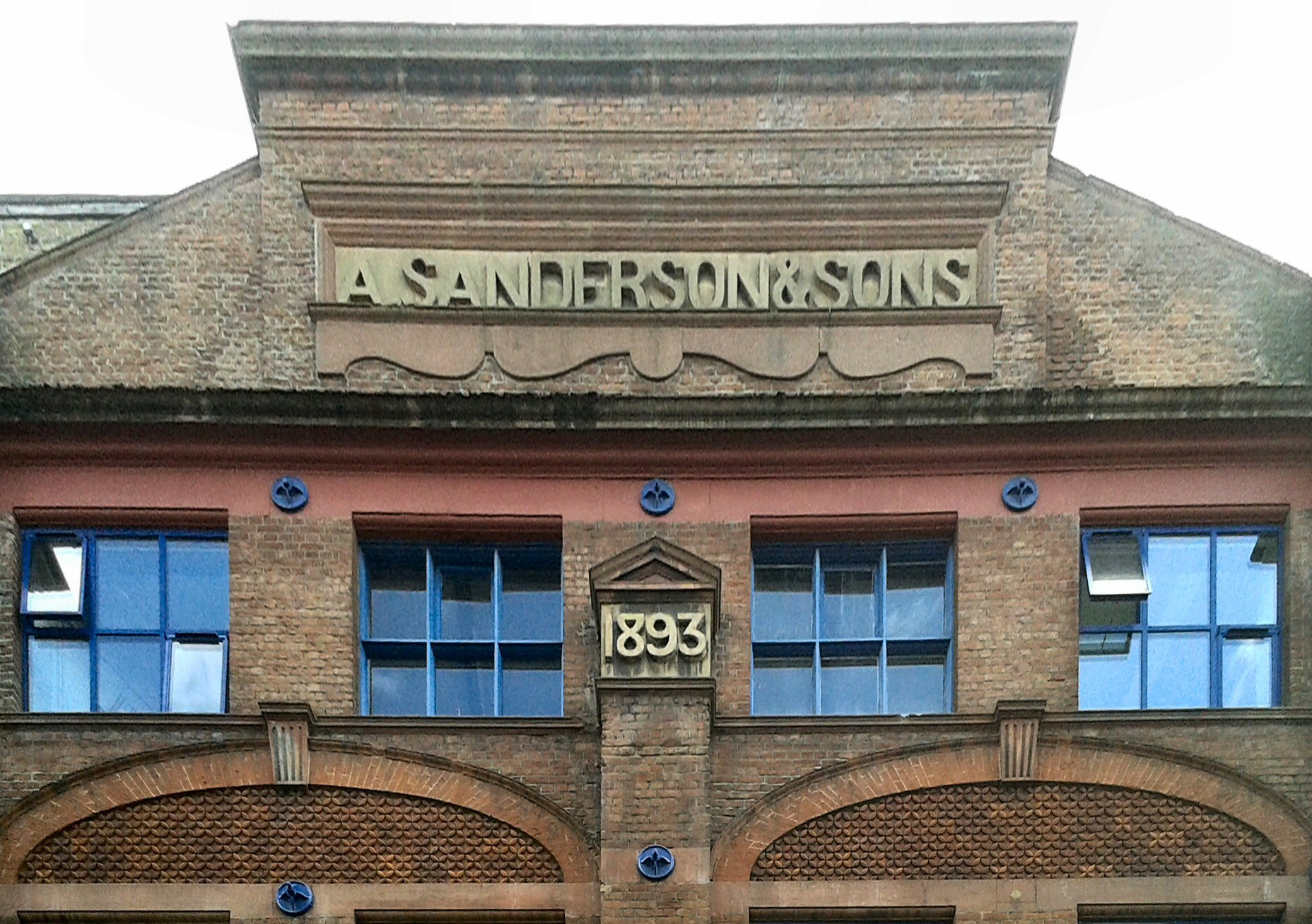
A Sanderson & Sons 1893: detail of Devonshire Works, Barley Mow Passage

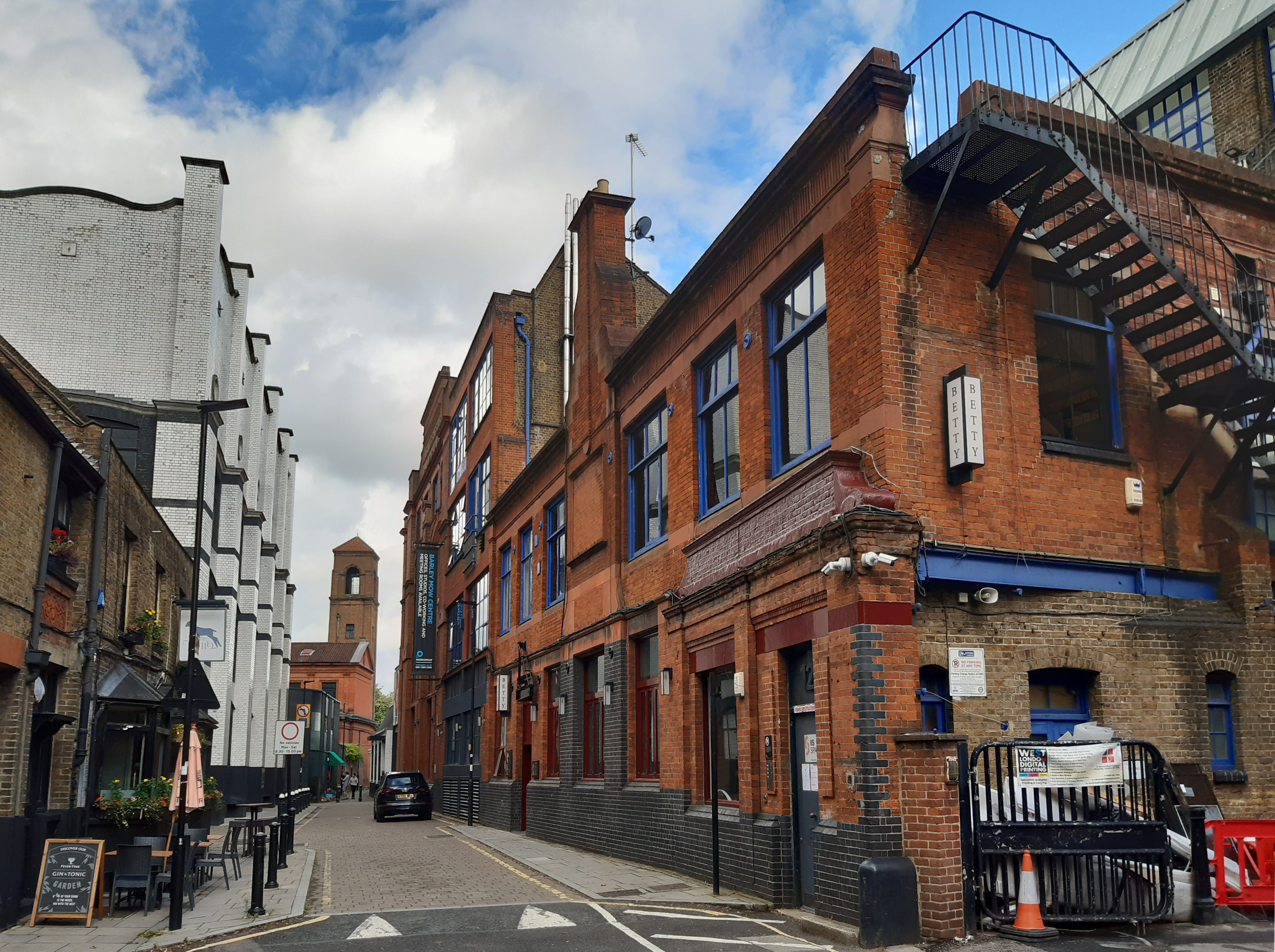
Barley Mow Passage, Voysey House and Devonshire Works. The tower of the Catholic church is in the background.

=== Chiswick Lane to Goldhawk Road ===
Nos 1-21 Chiswick High Road, on the south side, was designed by William Blore in 1837 and built in 1838. The entire building, then named William's Terrace, survives as a terrace of ten three-storey houses, though with some changes to the front, and additional structures in what were the front gardens, making it less conspicuous than it was when built. The 1837 print omits the roofs and chimneys to make the building look grander and more formal.

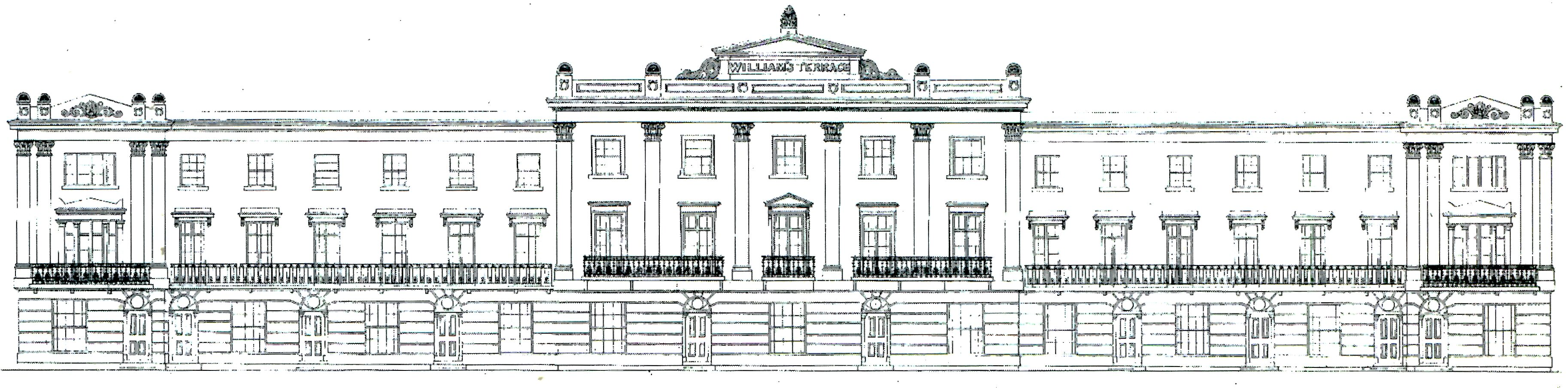
William's Terrace, 1-21 Chiswick High Road, 1837 print by William Blore, architect
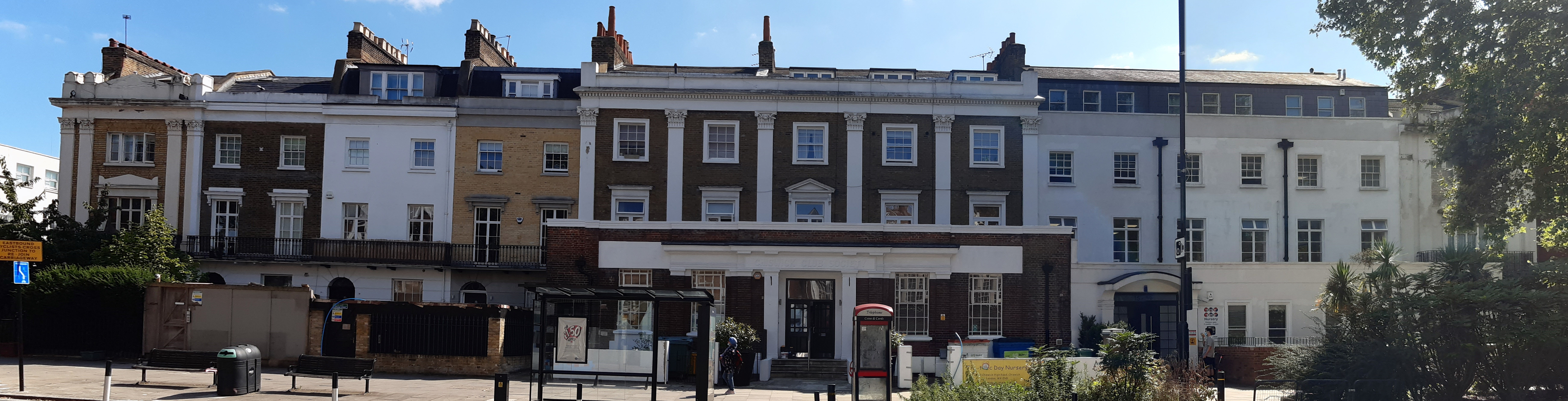
1-21 Chiswick High Road in 2021

The Power House, on the north of Chiswick High Road next to the bus garage, was built as an electricity generating station for the London United Electrical Tramway Company between 1899 and 1901. Pevsner describes it as a "monumental free Baroque brick and stone composition ... by far the most exciting building [on the High Road, and] ... the best surviving example in London from the early, heroic era of generating stations whose bulky intrusion in residential areas was tempered by thoughtful architectural treatment". When it fell into disuse it was threatened with demolition; the campaign to save it resulted in its Grade II listing.

Ballet Rambert's offices and training studios were housed in 94-96 Chiswick High Road from 1971 until 2013, when the company moved across London to the South Bank. The premises have been converted into the Chiswick Cinema, opened in 2021 with five screens and a bar.

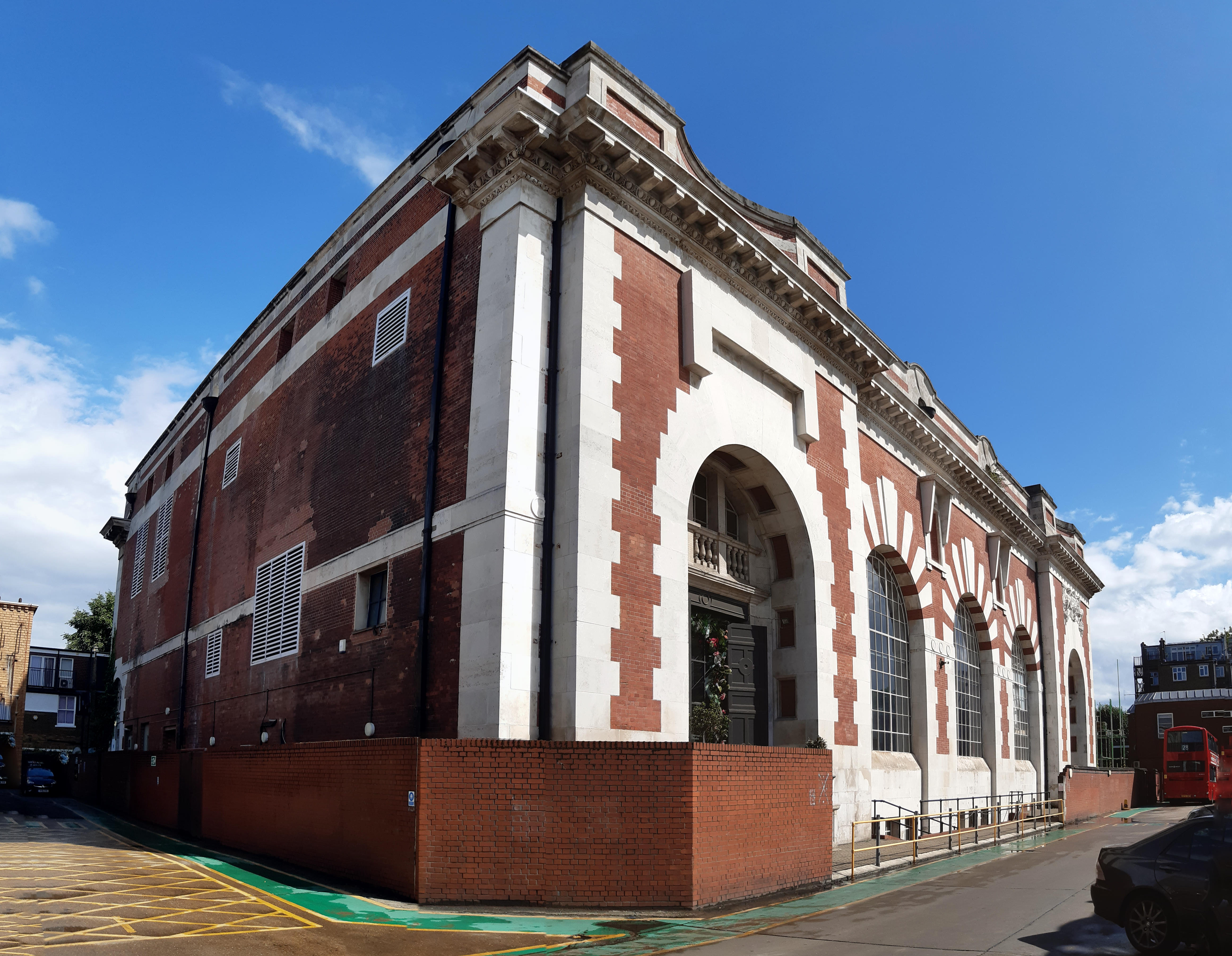
The Power House from southwest corner

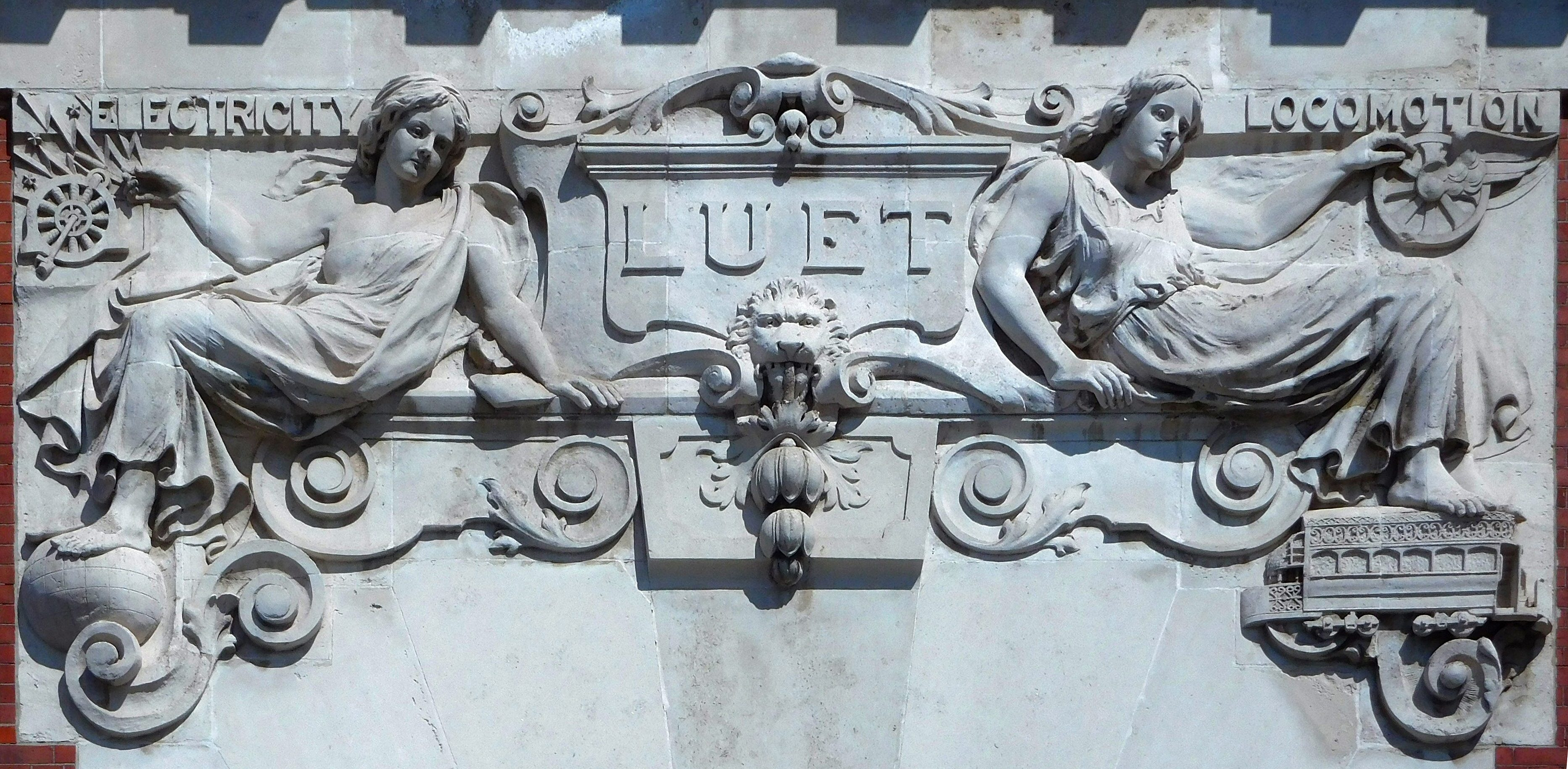
'Electricity' and 'Locomotion' sculpture on the London United Electrical Tramway Company's Power House

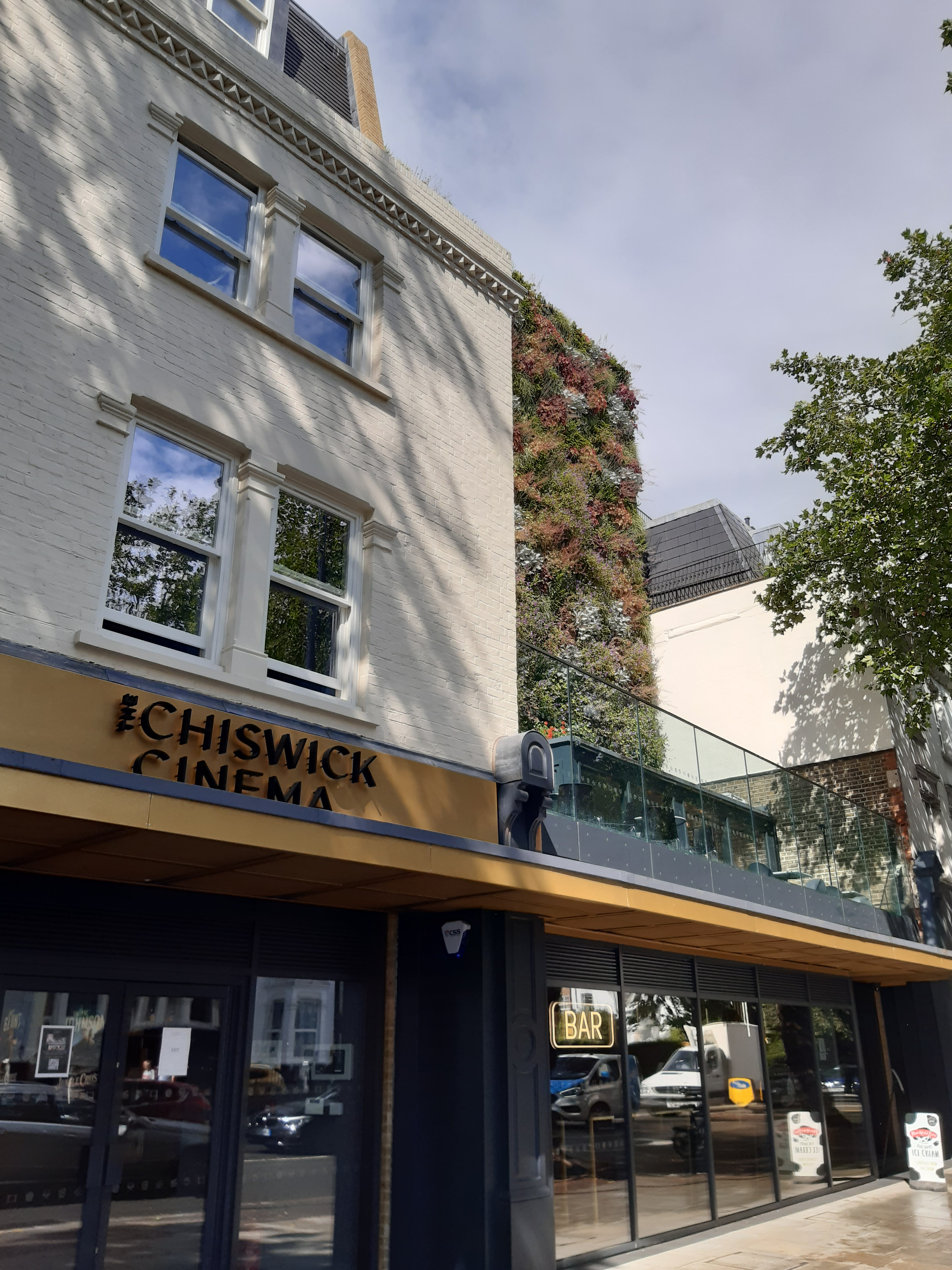
Chiswick Cinema, opened 2021

== Conservation areas ==
In 2015, Hounslow Council appraised part of Chiswick High Road as a conservation area, near those of Bedfork Park and the old village of Chiswick, to the north and south respectively. The area's western end is on Clifton Gardens (a short distance east of Turnham Green), and its eastern end is on Chiswick Lane; it extends northwards to take in the buildings on the east side of Turnham Green Terrace, whose shops and restaurants are part of the same shopping centre. The appraisal noted that the "consistent three storey height, regular fenestration pattern, strong parapet line and plot widths work together to provide a regular rhythm" along the High Road.

In 2021, Hounslow Council reappraised the Turnham Green Conservation area. This is adjacent to the Chiswick High Road conservation area, covering the part of the High Road from Chiswick Road in Gunnersbury to the west, via the whole of Turnham Green common and the buildings facing its north side along the High Road, to Clifton Gardens in the east. It takes in a substantial area to the south of the common, and was extended in 2019 to include the streets between Sutton Court Road and Duke's Avenue down to the Great West Road.

== Cycling and traffic ==
In 2020, Hounslow Council and Transport for London installed a two-way cycle lane, Cycleway 9, on the south side of Chiswick High Road in a "Low Traffic Neighbourhood" scheme. The lane had a mixed reception among traders and the public.

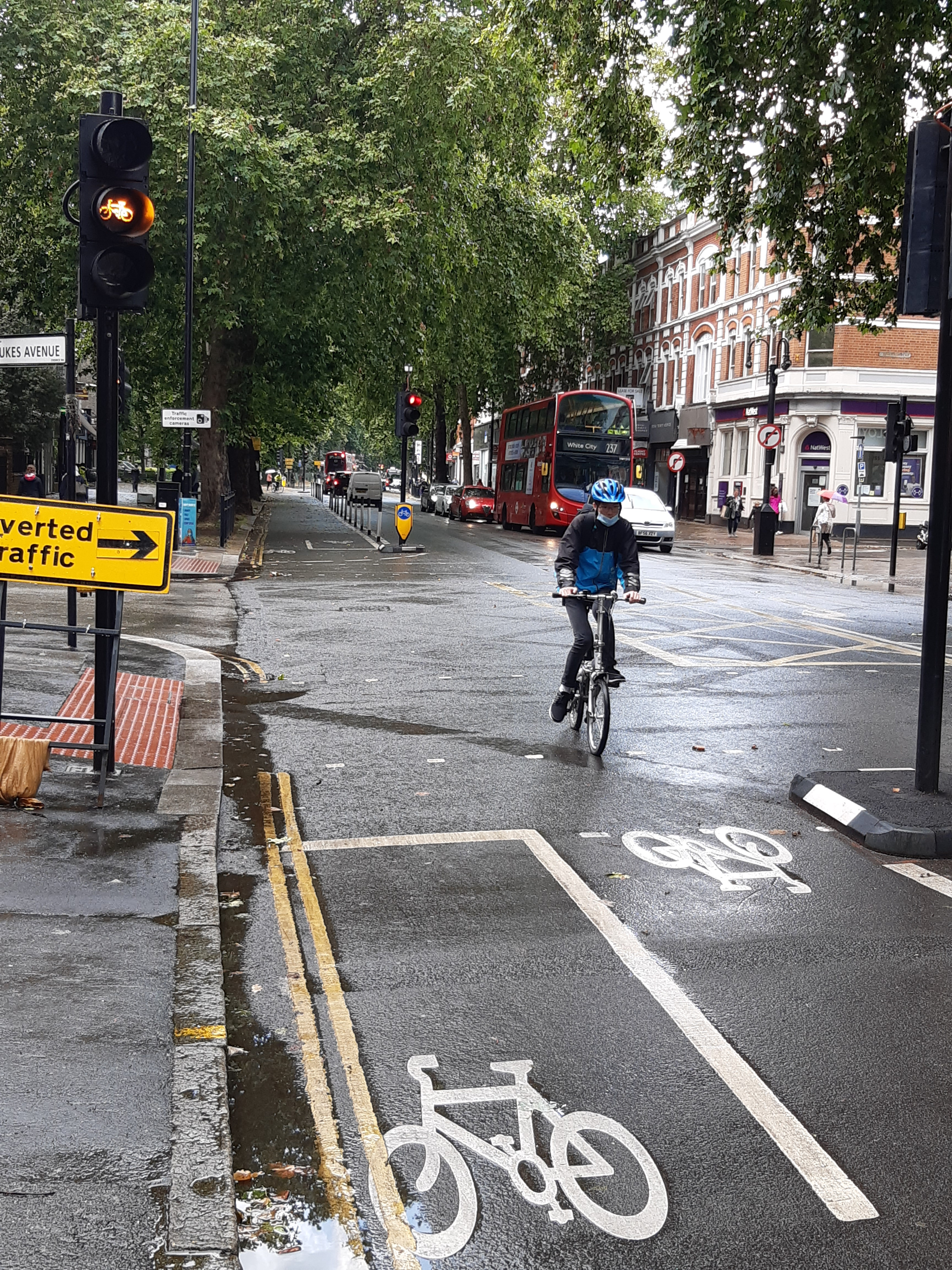
Cycle route 9 on Chiswick High Road

== Sources ==
- Cherry, Bridget; Pevsner, Nikolaus (1991). The Buildings of England. London 3: North West. London: Penguin Books. ISBN 978-0-14-071048-9. OCLC 24722942.
- Clegg, Gillian (1995). Chiswick Past. Historical Publications. ISBN 0-94866-733-8.
- Margary, Ivan D. (1973). Roman Roads in Britain (3rd ed.). London: John Baker. ISBN 0-212-97001-1.
