= Peel Hunt =

British investment bank

Headquarters at 100 Liverpool Street, City of London

Peel Hunt is a British investment bank. It is based in London and carries out services such as stock market flotations and corporate financing. It is listed on the London Stock Exchange on its Alternative Investment Market.

Peel Hunt was founded in 1989 by Charles Peel and Christopher Holdsworth Hunt. It was taken over by the Belgian bank KBC in 2002. In 2010 it was taken over by a management buyout with external financing. It listed on the London Stock Exchange in 2021.
