= British Land =

UK real estate investment trust

The British Land Company Plc
- Type: Public limited company
- Traded as: LSE: BLND; FTSE 100 Component
- Industry: Real estate
- Founded: 1856; 170 years ago
- Headquarters: London, England, UK
- Key people: Sir John Ritblat (Honorary President); Joanne McNamara (CEO)
- Products: London offices and retail
- Revenue: ▲£523 million (2026)
- Operating income: ▲£379 million (2026)
- Net income: ▲£454 million (2026)
- Website: www.britishland.com

The British Land Company Plc is one of the largest property development and investment companies in the United Kingdom. The firm became a real estate investment trust when REITs were introduced in the UK in January 2007. It is headquartered in London, England, and is a founding member of the European Public Real Estate Association. It is listed on the London Stock Exchange and is a constituent of the FTSE 100 Index.

== History ==
The British Land Company was founded in 1856 as an offshoot of the National Freehold Land Society (later Abbey National) formed in 1849 with the two chief architects of the freehold land movement Richard Cobden and John Bright. Both were ardent supporters of a movement to extend enfranchisement. To qualify for a parliamentary vote it was then necessary to be a landowner and the main object of the National Freehold was to facilitate the acquisition of small plots of land by the people. To do this the British Land Co. would purchase land and then resell it on the best terms to any customer who wanted to buy it. With the extension of the franchise, this reason ceased to govern the operation of the company, and it began to operate as a normal business in the latter part of the nineteenth century.

In 2004 it received planning permission for a Richard Rogers designed skyscraper at 122 Leadenhall Street, known informally as "The Cheese Grater" in the City of London. Construction of the tower, which is the 6th tallest building in the United Kingdom, began in October 2007 and was completed in 2014.

In May 2005 British Land announced that it had agreed to purchase Pillar Property Plc for £811 million in cash to boost its position in the out-of-town retail property sector.

In 2006 Sir John Ritblat, who had chaired the company since 1970, stood down and was replaced by Chris Gibson-Smith.

In October 2011, the company was placed in the number one position, with 135 subsidiaries, on a list of FTSE 100 companies that use tax havens for their operations, as revealed in a database of their subsidiaries compiled for the first time by the development charity ActionAid.

In March 2019, the company appointed Tim Score as the chair of its board.

In September 2020, British Land announced that its chief executive Chris Grigg would exit the company December of that year. He was succeeded by the firms chief financial officer Simon Carter in November 2020.

In November 2020, British Land wrote down the value of its portfolio by almost £1 billion after retail income fell due to the COVID-19 pandemic in the United Kingdom.

In September 2023, it was reported that Meta, the owner of Facebook, had paid £149 million to British Land in order to break the lease on its Triton Square London Office. Meta reportedly had 18 years left on its lease at the time.

In January 2026, the company announced the resignation of its chief executive, Simon Carter, who was due to take up a new role at P3 Logistic Parks. In June 2026, it was announced that Joanne McNamara was to be appointed as his successor.

In January 2026, the company made an agreed offer to acquire Life Science REIT in a deal worth £150 million.

== Operations ==
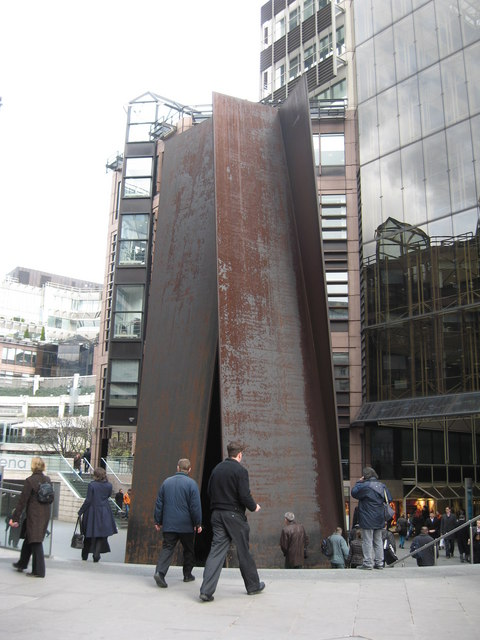
The Broadgate Estate in London

As of 31 March 2026 the company owned a portfolio valued at £6.4 billion. The portfolio includes a large amount of property which has been purchased from and leased back to major retailers such as Tesco, Sainsbury's, House of Fraser and Asda. This includes the Broadgate Estate, one of the largest developments in London over several decades, and Regent's Place near Warren Street Station.

Since October 2012 British Land and the Norwegian Government Pension Fund Global had each owned 50% stakes in Meadowhall, one of the UK's largest shopping centres based in Sheffield. An agreement between Norges Bank Investment Management (NBIM) and British Land was signed on 18 May 2024 for NBIM to acquire the remaining 50% stake of the Meadowhall estate from British Land, completing on 12 July 2024. The cost of the acquisition was £360 million. British Land would continue as the asset manager of the property.

== Main projects ==
- 1 Finsbury Avenue
- 2 Finsbury Avenue
- 122 Leadenhall Street, London
- Broadgate Tower
- 5 Broadgate, London
- Euston Tower
- Harmsworth Quays, London
- 4 Kingdom Street, Paddington, London
- 5 Kingdom Street, Paddington, London
- Norton Folgate and Blossom Street, London
- Stephen's Green Shopping Centre, Dublin
- Surrey Quays Shopping Centre, London
