= Horizon Building =

Coordinates: 52.9289°N 1.1753°W

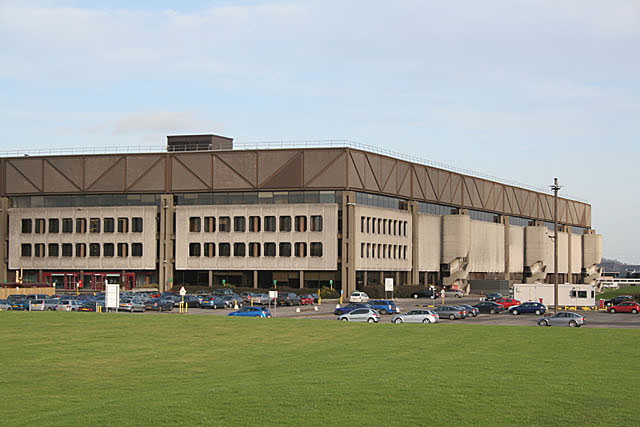
The Horizon Building

The Horizon Building was a former cigarette-making factory on a 45-acre site at the Lenton Industrial Estate in Nottingham, built for Player's, which was designed by the architect Peter Foggo for Arup Associates, opened in 1972, and won the Financial Times Architecture Award for 1973. It is now owned by Imperial Tobacco. In 2015 it looked likely to be rejected for listing, meaning that it would probably be demolished. When the factory closed in March 2016 it was England's last remaining cigarette factory.

Demolition was substantially complete by August 2019.

According to the Twentieth Century Society, "what makes Horizon fearsome is its structure ... Horizon looks as good today as when it was built".
