= Old Fire Station, Chiswick =

Fire station building in Chiswick

Coordinates: 51.4923°N 0.2575°W

The fire station as it was when in use, circa 1911. The station held a motor ambulance, a horse-drawn fire engine, and a motor escape ladder. The hose tower holds a long escape ladder.

The Old Fire Station, Chiswick is an 1891 brick building with stone facings on Chiswick High Road. It served as a fire station until 1963, and has since been used as a restaurant.

== Architecture ==
The fire station on the south side of Chiswick High Road was purpose-built in 1891, when it received a new steam engine. In 1911, it was equipped with a motor fire escape and ambulance, allowing it to claim it was one of the best in London. The building's tower was used both to store the long escape ladder, and to hang up the leather hosepipes to dry.

The building, in red brick with stone facings, was most likely designed by Arthur Ramsden, the local board's surveyor. The clock tower is an early example of a hose tower. The façade is decorated with a carving of a fireman's helmet and a fire axe above the principal window on the second floor.

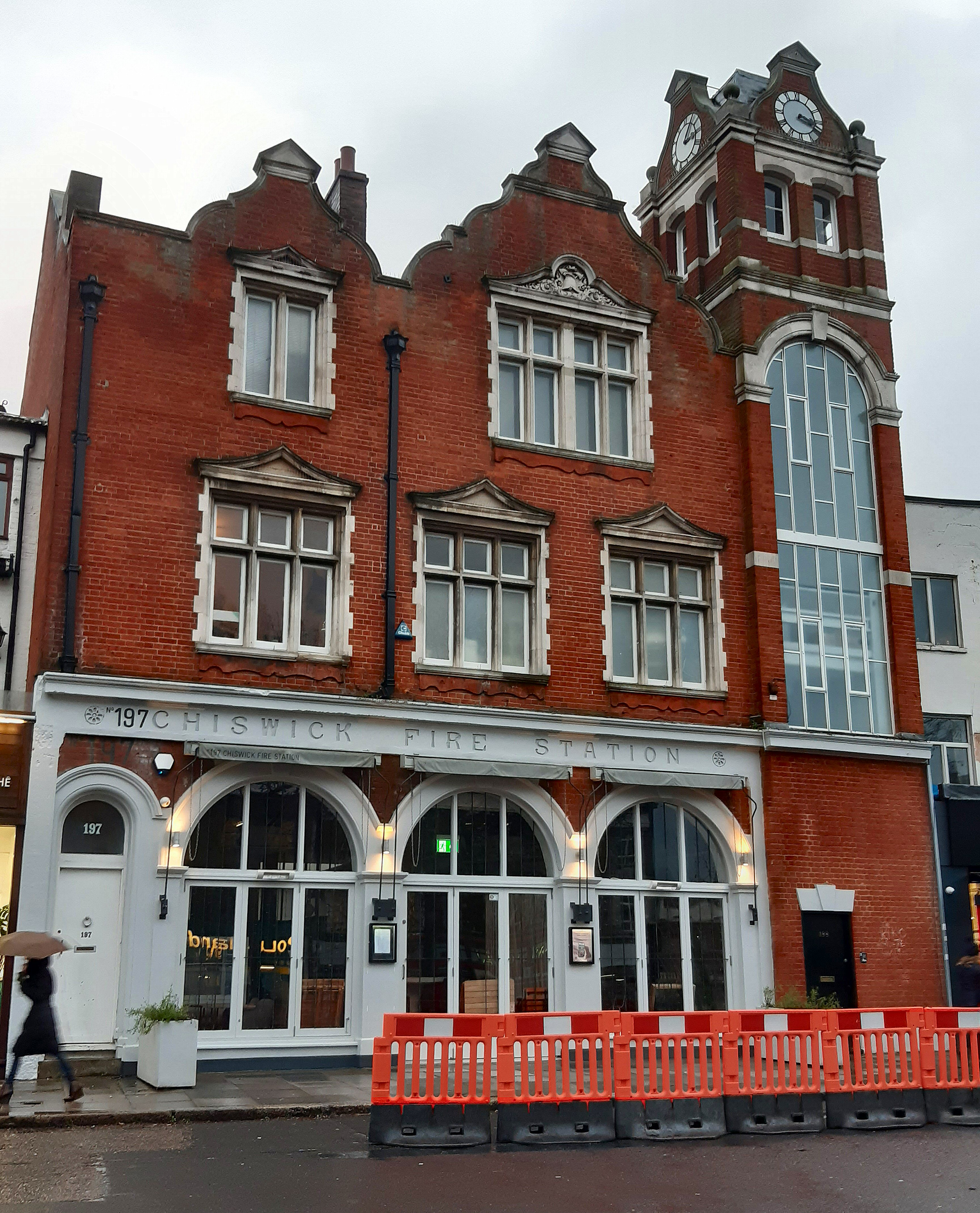
Façade

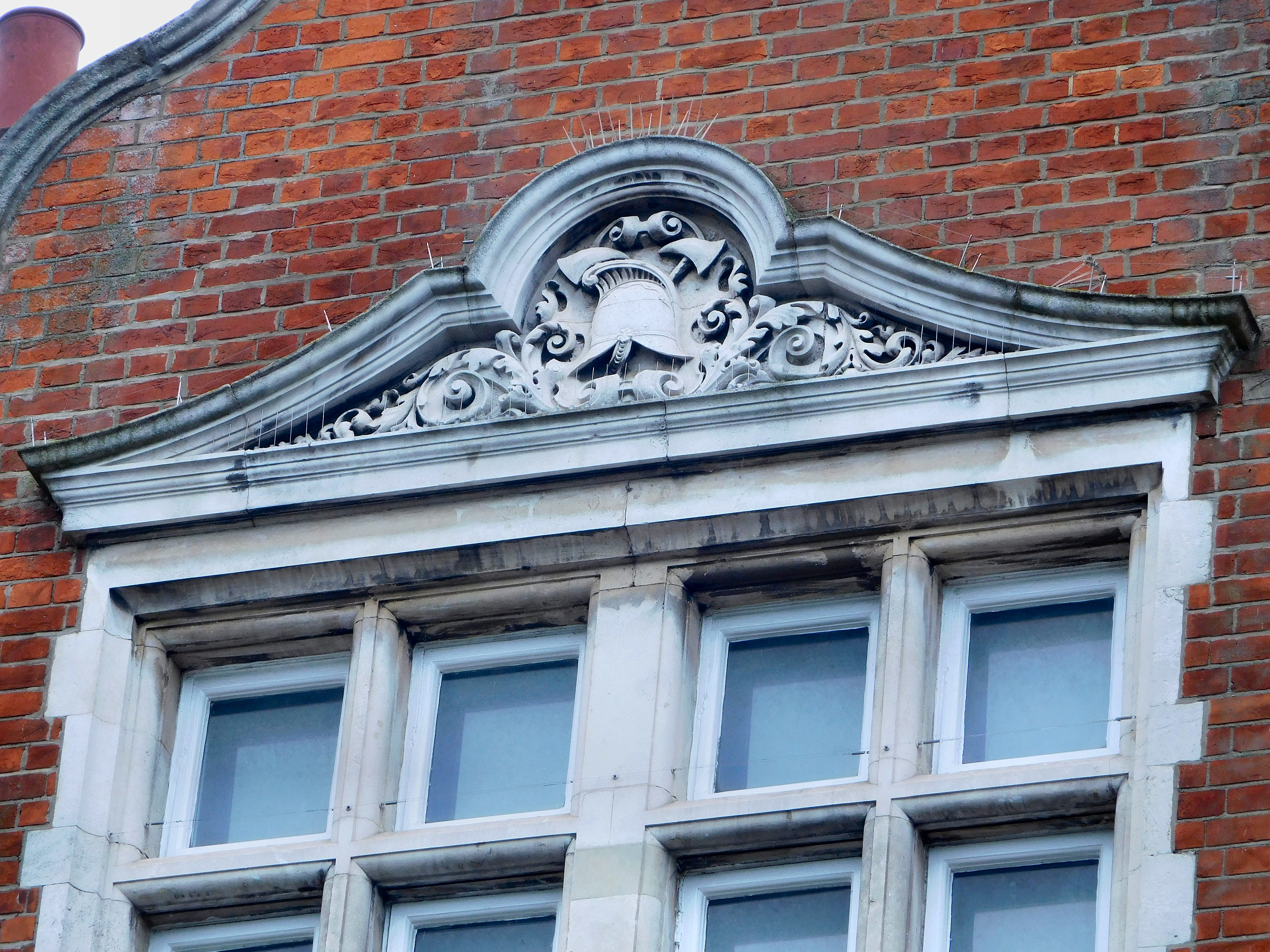
Window pediment with carved fire helmet and axe

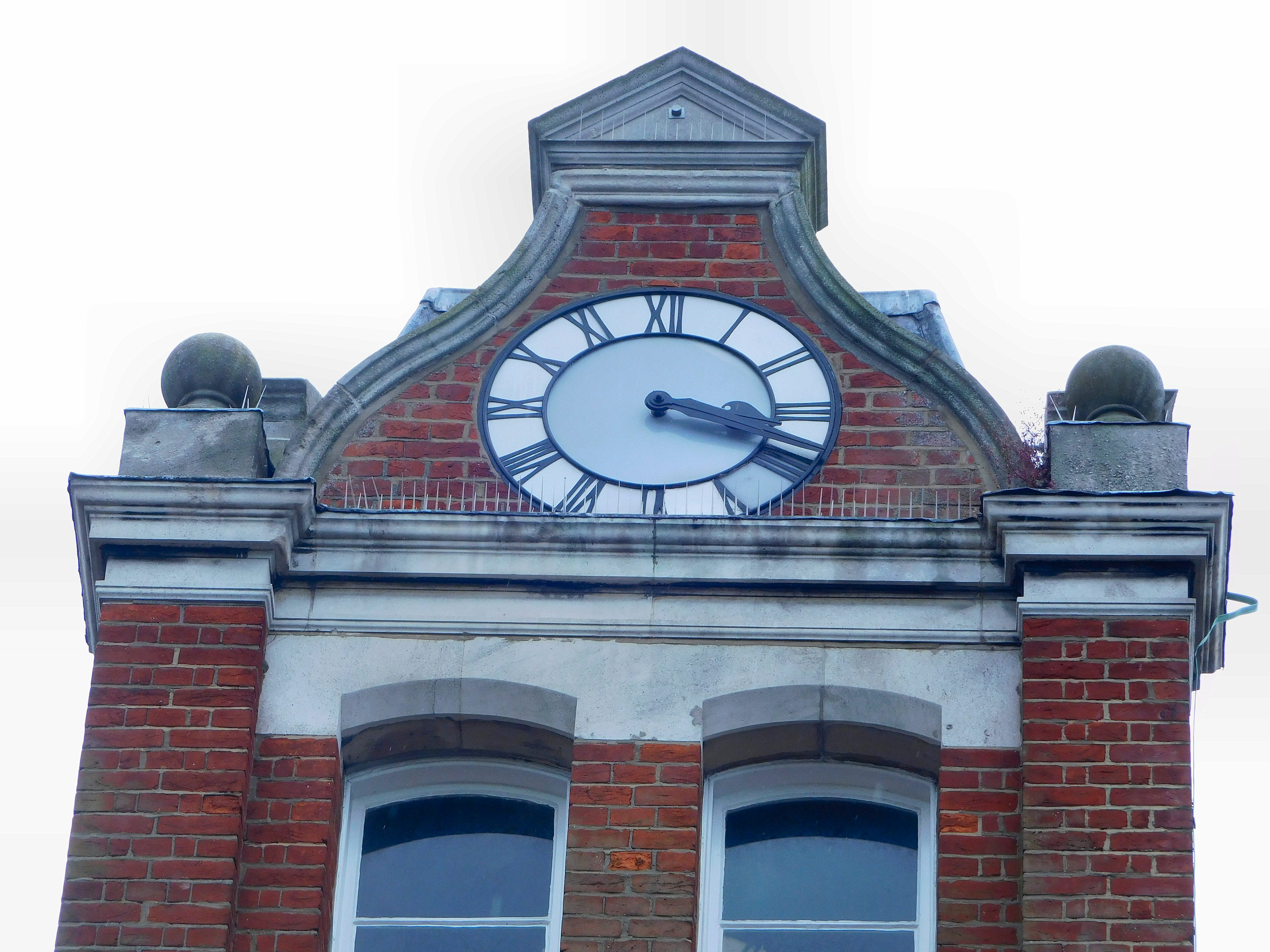
Top of Clock Tower

== Usage ==
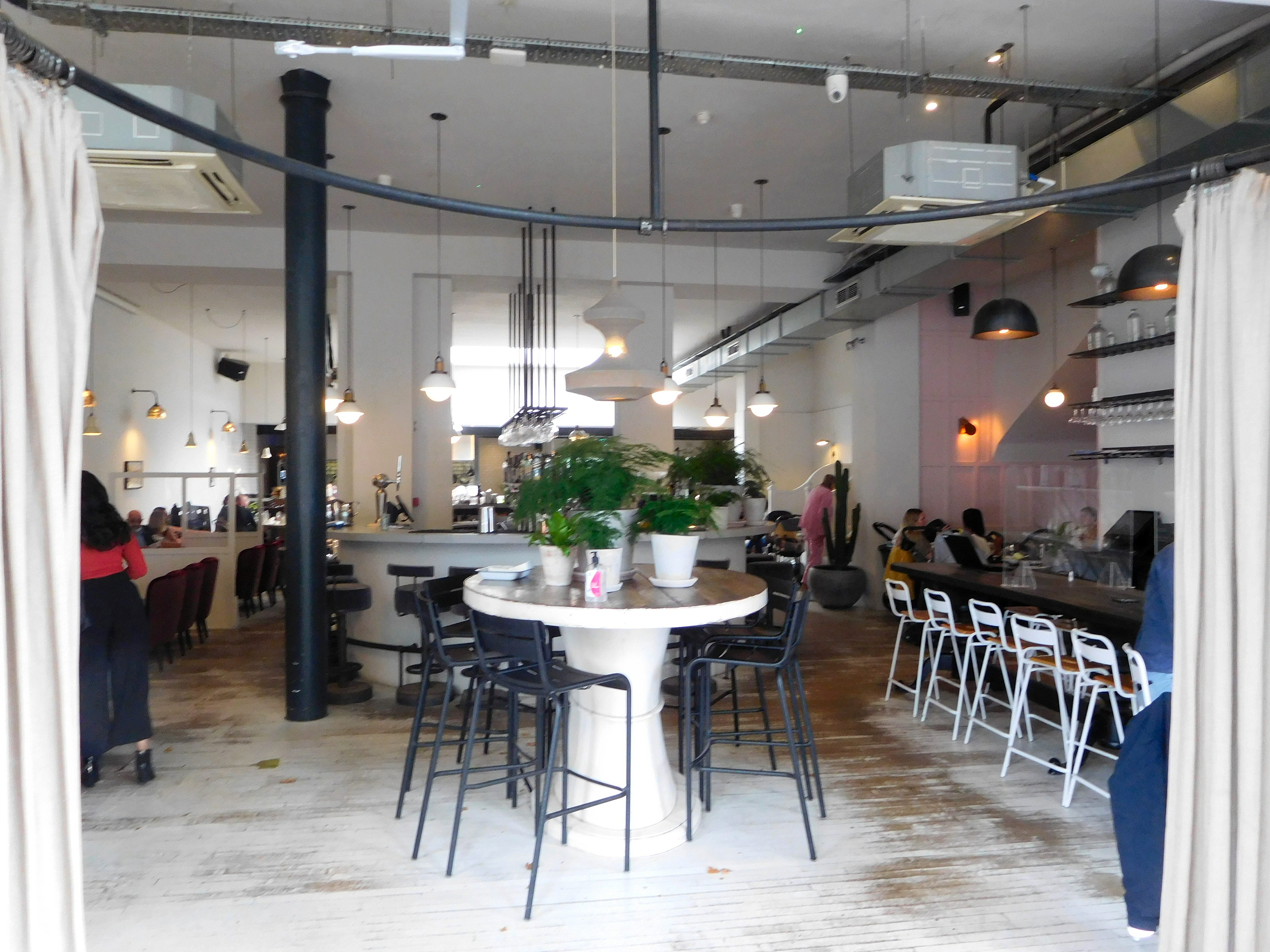
'No. 197 Chiswick Fire Station' restaurant interior

In 1937 the Chiswick fire service, which with 18 full-time firemen had outgrown the accommodation in the old fire station, moved its offices to Linden House and its equipment to a former market area beside it. In 1963, a new fire station was built at the corner of Heathfield Gardens by Turnham Green.

The old fire station was then used as a restaurant, first, with the name of building obscured, by All Bar One until 2016, and then by Darwin & Wallace. Their refurbishment, under the architects Box 9 Design and Red Deer, revealed the masonry carving of the building's original name, and they decided to run their business under the name of 'No. 197 Chiswick Fire Station'. The restaurant has both indoor and outdoor dining, the latter in a "forgotten courtyard". The restaurant is furnished with chairs made by The French House, tiles by Bert and May, and artworks chosen by The Hang Up Gallery. It won the 'Pub' category in the Restaurant & Bar Design Awards, 2017.
