= Peter Foggo =

British architect

Peter Foggo (1930–1993) was a British architect, who headed the team at Arup Associates which designed the first phase of development at London's Broadgate in the 1980s, including Grade II listed 1 Finsbury Avenue.

Foggo joined the Ove Arup Building Group in 1959, and became a partner in the new Arup Associates in 1963.

Foggo designed the Horizon Building, a cigarette-making factory on a 45-acre (18 ha) site at the Lenton Industrial Estate in Nottingham for Player's, which opened in 1972, and won the Financial Times Architecture Award for 1973. It is now owned by Imperial Tobacco, and having been granted immunity from listing, demolition began in December 2018.

In 1989, he established Peter Foggo Associates, renamed Foggo Associates after his death.
