= 2 Finsbury Avenue =

Building complex in London, England

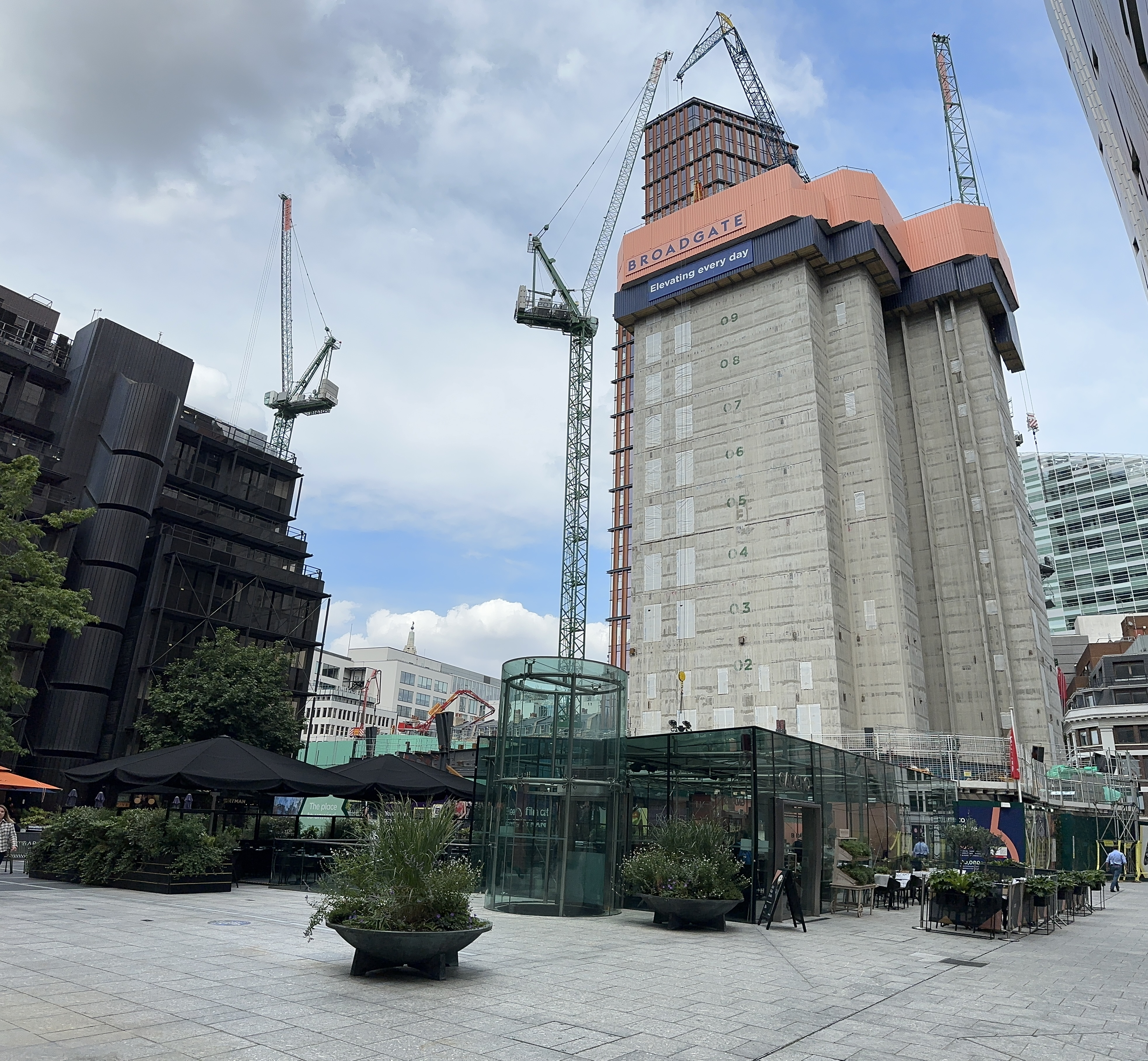

General information
- Location: 2-3 Finsbury Avenue, City of London
- Coordinates: 51.5200°N 0.0848°W

Height
- Height: 156 m (511 ft)

Technical details
- Floor count: 37

Design and construction
- Architects: 3XN, Adamson Associates (International) Ltd. (as executive architect)

2 Finsbury Avenue is a skyscraper complex under construction in Broadgate, City of London, United Kingdom.

== Overview ==
The development consists of two buildings. The taller, 37-storey, East Tower will reach a height of 156 metres (511 feet) while the shorter West Tower will be 21 storeys tall. The two towers are connected by a 12-storey podium. The complex was designed by Danish architectural firm 3XN, with Adamson Associates (International) Ltd. as executive architect. Construction began in 2024.

The buildings feature a series of faceted triangles on the facade. The complex is being developed as a joint venture between British Land and GIC, while Sir Robert McAlpine has been chosen for the construction of the development. The buildings will target net zero carbon in construction and operation as well as a BREEAM "Outstanding" certification.

Hedge fund Citadel and market maker Citadel Securities will lease over 250,000 square feet (23,000 m^{2}) of workspace upon the completion of the development.

== See also ==
- 1 Finsbury Avenue
