= 1 Finsbury Avenue =

Office building in London, England

- Western exterior of 1 Finsbury Avenue

General information
- Type: Office
- Location: London, England
- Coordinates: 51°31′10″N 0°05′07″W
- Completed: 1984

Design and construction
- Architect: Peter Foggo of Arup Associates

Listed Building – Grade II
- Official name: 1 Finsbury Avenue
- Designated: 26 January 2015
- Reference no.: 1422594

1 Finsbury Avenue is a Grade II listed office block that stands in the Broadgate area of the City of London.

== History and description ==
The building was built as a seminal new office block in the Broadgate area of London, which would see significant redevelopment with office buildings blocks going up in the area. It was a speculative construction under Stuart Lipton, director of Greycoat City Properties, between 1982 and 1984 in preparation for the "Big Bang", a phase of financial deregulation in London. Its design, by Peter Foggo of Arup Associates leant into 1970s hi-tech aesthetics but were also pioneering, being the first atrium-block constructed in the city.

With the Broadgate development producing a number of pedestrian spaces in the area, a number of public art pieces stand or previously stood around the building. The 1983 sculpture Rush Hour previously stood outside the eastern side of the building. Horse & Eagle by Robert Clatworthy was also commissioned for the building but instead stands within a garden in Charing Cross Hospital.

=== Awards ===
Among the awards for the building's design were the Financial Times Architecture at Work Award in 1985, the Structural Steel Design Award in 1985 and the RIBA London Award in 1987. 1 Finsbury Avenue was given Grade II listed status in 2015. It also won the RIBA London Award in 2021 for the retrofit undertaken by Allford Hall Monaghan Morris.

== See also ==
- 2 Finsbury Avenue
