= The Sayer Family of Richmond =

Painting by Johann Zoffany

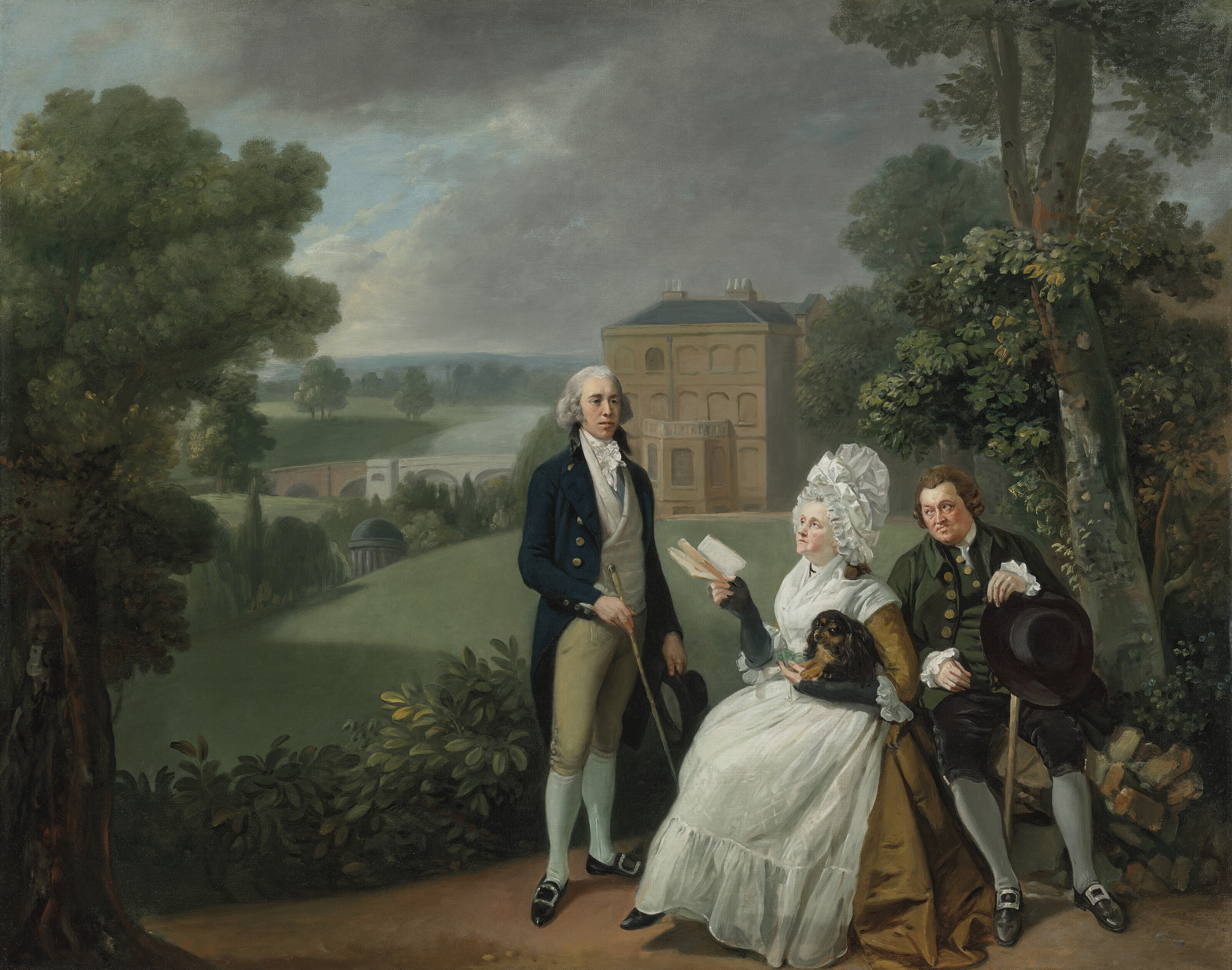
- Artist: Johan Zoffany
- Year: c.1781
- Type: Oil on canvas, portrait painting
- Dimensions: 101.5 cm × 127 cm (40.0 in × 50 in)
- Location: Private collection

The Sayer Family of Richmond is a 1781 oil painting by the German-born British artist Johan Zoffany. A conversation piece, it depicts the publisher Robert Sayer, his wife Alice and son John. Behind them is Sayer's newly built property Cardigan House on Richmond Hill, with Richmond Bridge further in the distance. Cardigan House was not yet completed when Zoffany painted it, so likely featured a degree of artistic license. Sayer sold prints based on Zoffany's works. The painting was commissioned by Robert Sayer and remained in the family until 1934 when it was acquired at Sotheby's by William Randolph Hearst. More recently, it was auctioned by Christie's in 2022.

== See also ==
- England: Richmond Hill, on the Prince Regent's Birthday, an 1819 painting by J.M.W. Turner

== Bibliography ==
- Postle, Martin. Johan Zoffany RA: Society Observed. Yale Center for British Art, 2011.
- Treadwell, Penelope. Johan Zoffany: Artist and Adventurer. Paul Holberton, 2009.
- Webster, Mary. Johan Zoffany, 1733-1810. National Portrait Gallery, 1976.
