= Cardigan House =

Historic property in London

Coordinates: 51.4554°N 0.3021°W

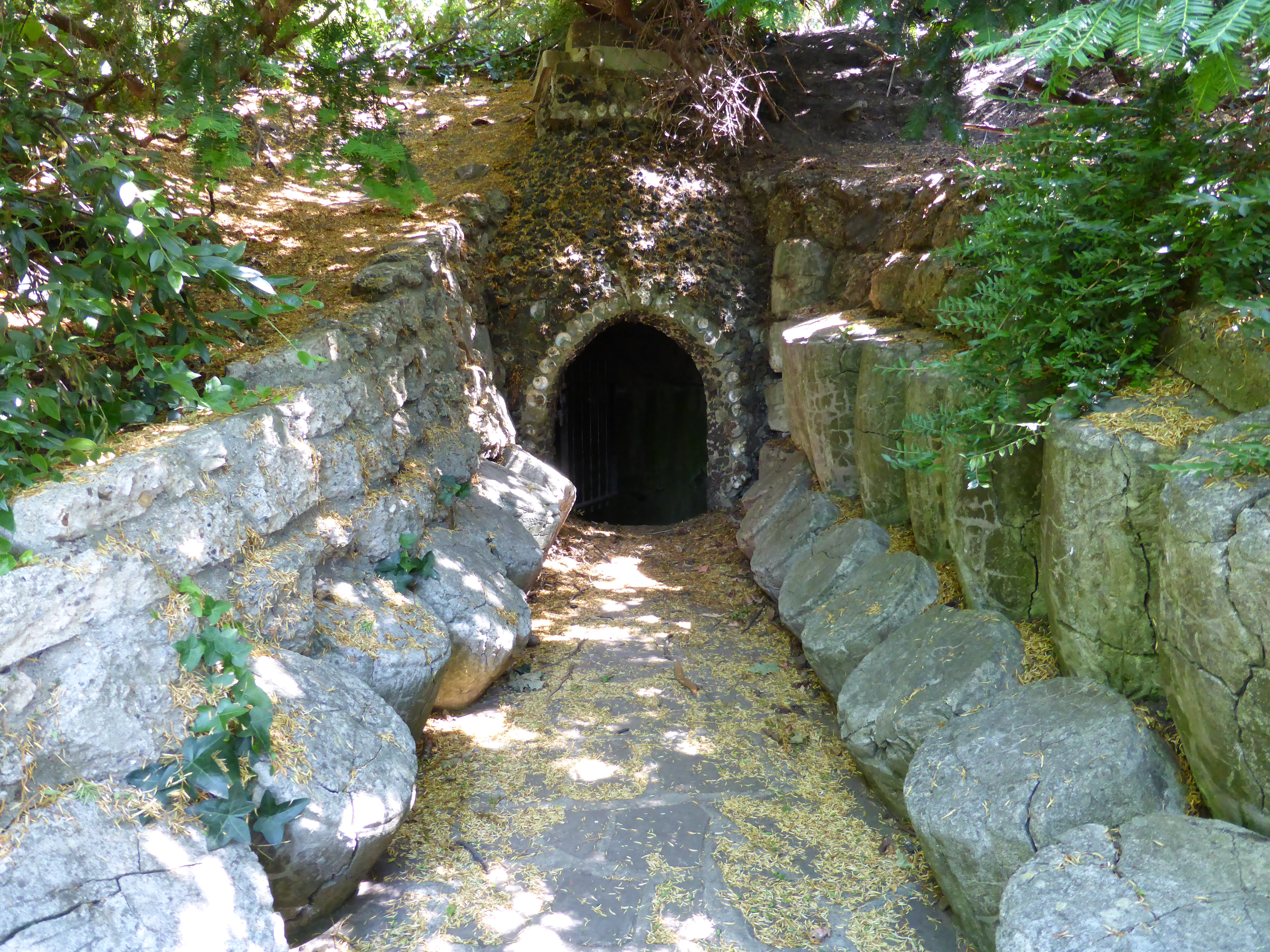
The former icehouse now in the Terrace Gardens

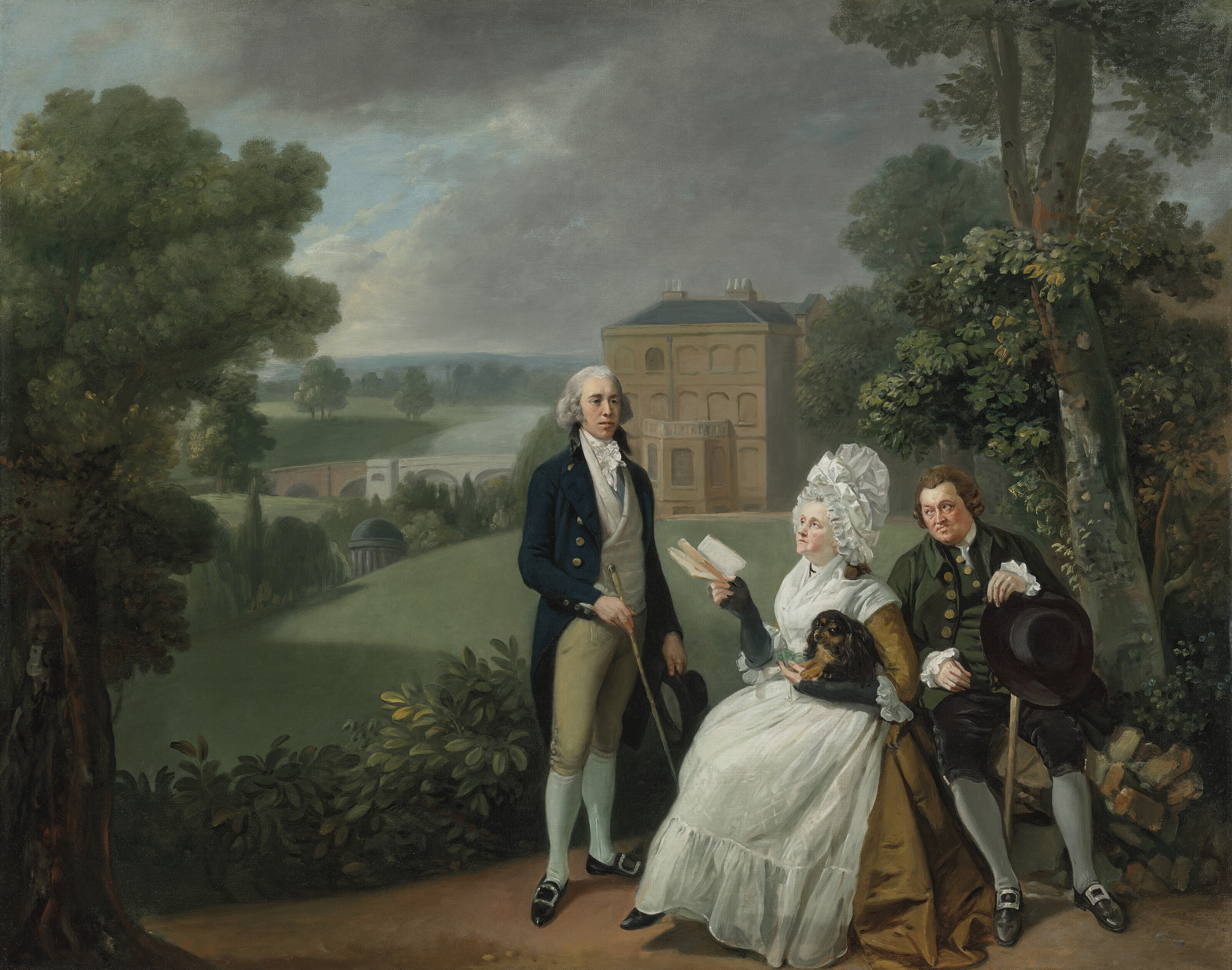
The Sayer Family of Richmond by John Zoffany, 1781. Cardigan House is in the background.

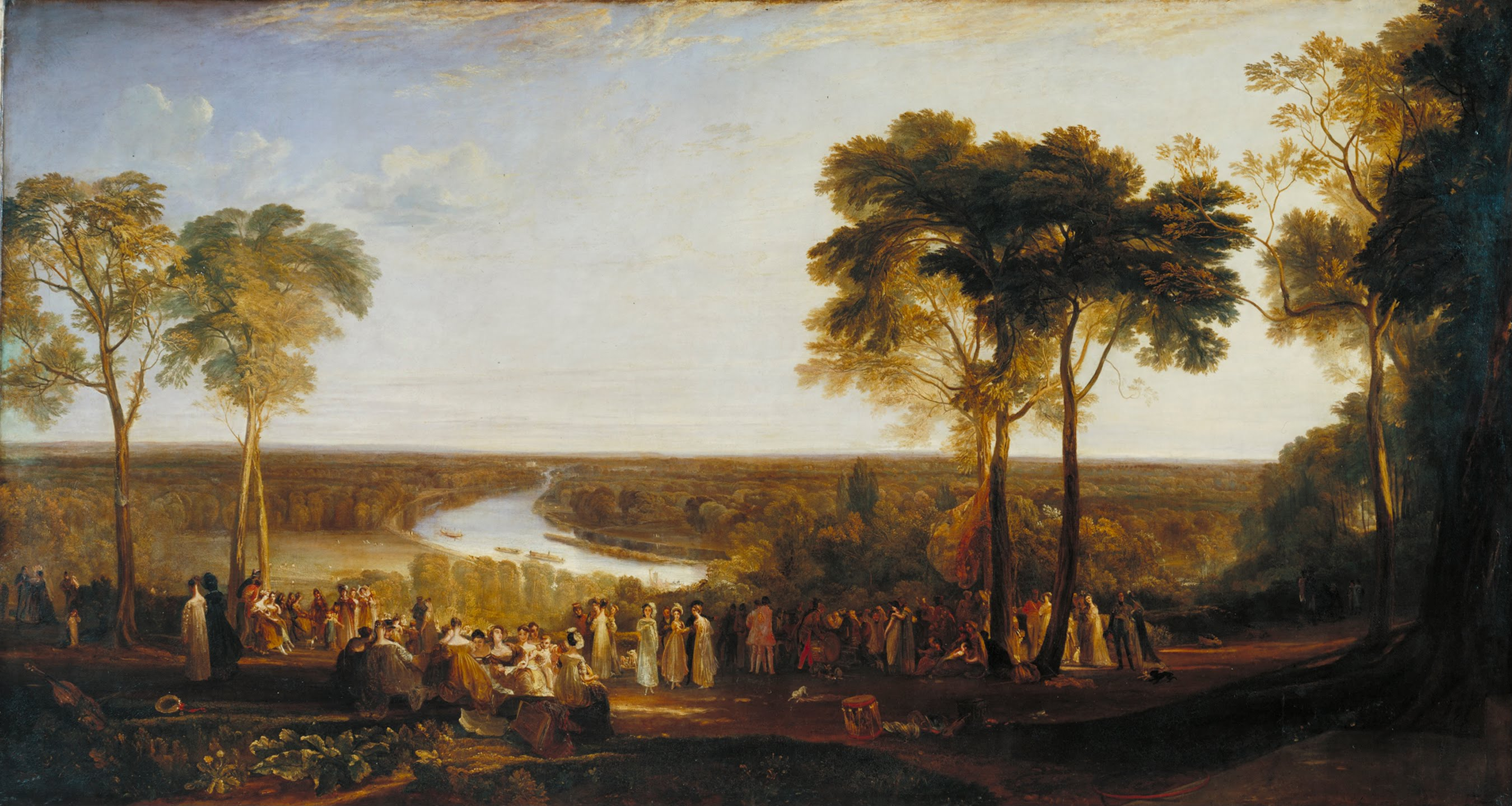
Turner's 1819 painting England: Richmond Hill, on the Prince Regent's Birthday depicts the grounds of Cardigan House.

Cardigan House on Richmond Hill, Surrey, now in London, was a country house constructed between 1791 and 1793 by the architect Robert Mylne for the wealthy publisher Robert Sayer. In 1794 it was rented by the Duke of Clarence, later to become William IV, who lived there until 1797 with his mistress the Irish actress Dorothea Jordan and their children. It then passed into the hands of the Earls of Cardigan as a country retreat in what was still a rural area. Another large property, Lansdowne House, was located nearby. It should not be confused with Cardigan House in Lincoln's Inn Fields, the London townhouse of the Earls.

In 1817 Lady Cardigan, wife of the sixth Earl, hosted a birthday celebration for the Prince Regent (later George IV) at Cardigan House. The scene was depicted in an 1819 painting England: Richmond Hill, on the Prince Regent's Birthday by the artist J. M. W. Turner.

When the 6th Earl died, the house was purchased by Mrs Sarah Roberts (1777–1866), daughter of Thomas Roberts, Master of the Merchant Taylors Company. She had been the house's tenant since the 1820s, and lived there until her death.

In 1925 the house was purchased by the British Legion for expansion of the Poppy Factory on Petersham Road. It was demolished in 1970. Its grounds now form part of the Terrace Gardens.

== Sources ==
- Brigden, Tom. The Protected Vista: An Intellectual and Cultural History. Routledge, 2019.
- Govett, John. "Cardigan House and the Roberts family", Richmond History 40, 2019. Richmond Local History Society. ISSN 0263-0958
- Hamilton, James. Turner. Random House, 2003.
