= John William Norie =

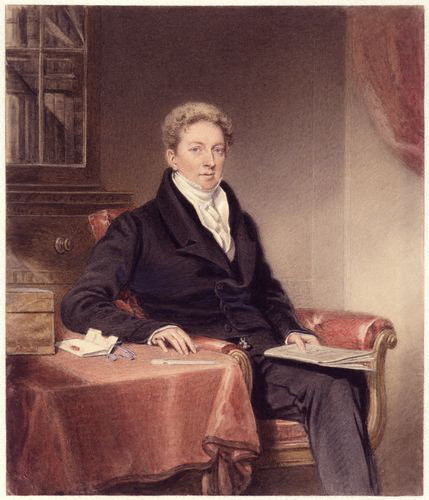
- Born: 3 July 1772; London
- Died: 24 December 1843 (aged 71)
- Occupations: Hydrographer; mathematician; publisher

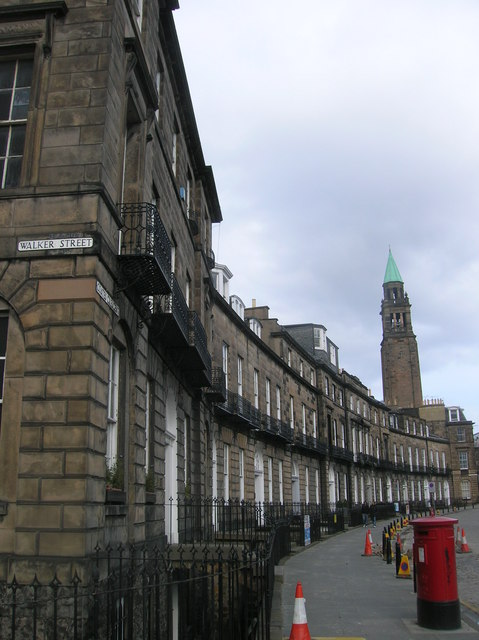
Coates Crescent, Edinburgh

John William Norie (3 July 1772 in London – 24 December 1843), was a mathematician, hydrographer, chart maker and publisher of nautical books most famous for his Epitome of Practical Navigation (1805) which became a standard work on navigation and went through many editions as did many of Norie's works.

Norie began his career working with William Heather, who had in 1765 taken over chart publishers Mount and Page and who ran the Naval Academy and Naval Warehouse in Leadenhall Street from 1795; the Naval Warehouse provided navigational instruments, charts, and books on navigation. Norie took over the Naval Warehouse after Heather's retirement and founded the company J.W. Norie and Company in 1813. After Norie's death the company became Norie and Wilson, then in 1903 Imray, Laurie, Norie & Wilson.

Charles Dickens later used the Naval Warehouse in Dombey and Son. Jack London mentions Norie's Epitome in Chapter 5 of his novel Martin Eden, and C. S. Forester refers to it in chapters 1 and 8 of Mr. Midshipman Hornblower and in Chapter 17 of The Commodore, both of the Horatio Hornblower series of novels.

He died at 3 Coates Crescent in Edinburgh's fashionable West End, Leaving his house to William H. Norie FRSE a barrister-at-law.

== Bibliography ==
- A New and Complete Epitome of Practical Navigation (1805)
- Complete East India Pilot (1816)
- The shipwright's vade-mecum (1822)
- Complete North Sea and Baltic Pilot (1824) – reissued 1848
- Complete North America and United States Pilot (1825)
- Piloting Directions for the River and Gulf of St. Lawrence (1826)
- West India directory, containing instructions for navigating the Caribbee (1827)
- New Piloting Directions for the Mediterranean Sea, the Adriatic, or Gulf of Venice, the Black Sea, Grecian Archipelago, and the Seas of Marmara and Azov (1831)
- Complete British and Irish Coasting Pilot (1835) – reissued 1845
- Plates Descriptive of the Maritime Flags of All Nations (1838)
- The naval gazetteer, biographer, and chronologist; new and improved (1842)
- Complete Mediterranean Pilot (1845)
- Norie, John William; Hobbs, J. S. (1847) [First published 1840]. Sailing directions for the Bay of Biscay, including the coasts of France and Spain, from Ushant to Cape Finisterre (A new ed., rev. and considerably improved ed.). C. Wilson. OCLC 41208722.
- Brazil and South American Pilot (c. 1850)
- Sailing directions for the navigation of the North Sea (1852)

== See also ==
- Blueback chart
