= George Cooke (British Army officer) =

Major-General Sir George Cooke KCB
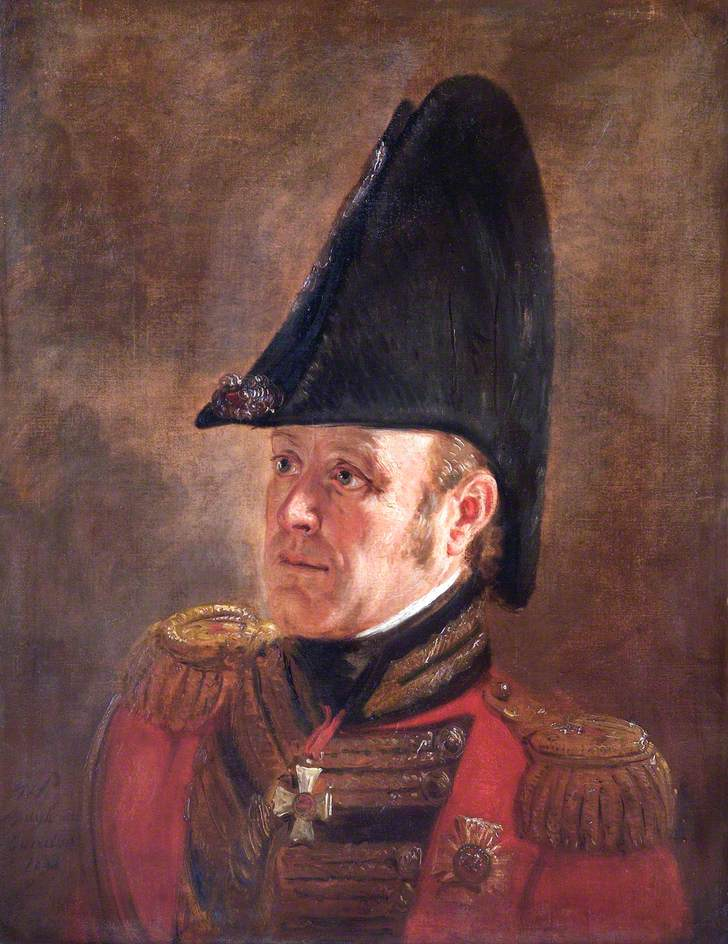
- Portrait by Jan Willem Pieneman
- Born: 1766
- Died: 3 February 1837 (age 68–69); Harefield Park, Harefield
- Military career
- Allegiance: United Kingdom
- Branch: British Army
- Rank: Major-General
- Conflicts: French Revolutionary Wars; Napoleonic Wars
- Awards: Knight Commander of the Order of the Bath

Major-General Sir George Cooke KCB (bapt. 26 August 1766 – 3 February 1837) was a British Army officer who commanded the 1st Division, under overall command of the Prince of Orange, at the Battle of Waterloo.

== Early life and education ==
Cooke was the son and heir of George John Cooke of Harefield, MP for Middlesex, and Penelope Bowyer, daughter of Sir William Bowyer, 3rd Baronet of Denham Court. His father, the son of George Cooke, descended from a line of prothonotaries of the Court of Common Pleas. Educated at Harrow and at the military school in Caen, Normandy, in 1784 Cooke was appointed an ensign in the 10th Grenadier Guards. His brothers were General Sir Henry Frederick Cooke and naval officer Edward Cooke while his sister was Penelope Anne Cooke, who became Countess of Cardigan.

After his father's death, his mother remarried Major-Gen. Edward Smith, uncle to Admiral Sir Sidney Smith.

== Career ==
Cooke achieved his lieutenancy in 1792, followed shortly by his captaincy. In March 1794, he joined the Guards in Flanders and was appointed aide-de-camp to Major General Sir Samuel Hulse. He served throughout the French Revolutionary Wars, in Flanders and Holland, at the conclusion of which he was promoted to lieutenant-colonel of his regiment, despite being severely wounded in 1799. From 1803 until early 1805, he held the post of assistant adjutant-general of the north west district. After receiving the rank of brevet colonel in 1808, he participated in the ill-fated 1809 Schelde expedition. After posts in Cádiz, he went to Holland in 1813 with the Brigade of Guards and took part in the ill-fated Siege of Bergen op Zoom the following year where he was described as a "prudent and humane commander".

In 1815 Cooke was on Wellington's staff at the Battle of Waterloo, where he lost his right arm. For his services at Waterloo he was made a Knight Commander of the Order of the Bath (KCB) on 22 June 1815 and a Knight of St George of Russia.

He became Lieutenant-Governor of Portsmouth and General Officer Commanding South-West District in 1819.

He died, unmarried, at Harefield Park on 3 February 1837.

== Sources ==
Bibliography

- Cooke, John; Fitz-Clarence, George Augustus F. (1831). Memoirs of the Late War: Comprising the Personal Narrative of Capt. Cooke, the History of the Campaign of 1809 in Portugal, by the Earl of Munster, and a Narrative of the Campaign of 1814 in Holland, by T.W.D. Moodie. Vol. II. London: Henry Colburn and Richard Bentley.
- Dalton, Charles (1904). The Waterloo roll call. With biographical notes and anecdotes. London: Eyre and Spottiswoode.

Attribution

- This article incorporates text from a publication now in the public domain: Carlyle, Edward Irving (1901). "Sir George Cooke". In Lee, Sidney (ed.). Dictionary of National Biography (1st supplement). London: Smith, Elder & Co. p. 58.

Military offices
Preceded by Sir James Kempt	GOC South-West District; 1819–1821	Succeeded by Sir James Lyon
