= Vertical Offshore Reference Frames =

UK and Irish hydrographic vertical datum

Separation between MSL and LAT for the UK and Eire Vertical Offshore Reference Frame (VORF 2008)

Vertical Offshore Reference Frames (VORF) is a set of high resolution surface models, published and maintained by the UK Hydrographic Office, which together define a vertical datum for hydrographic surveying and charting in the United Kingdom and Ireland.

== Tidal surface models ==
The following tidal and sea level surfaces are included:

- Chart Datum (CD)
- Lowest Astronomical Tide (LAT)
- Mean Sea Level (MSL)
- Mean Low Water Springs (MLWS)
- Mean High Water Springs (MHWS)
- Highest Astronomical Tide (HAT)
- Land datums including Ordnance Datums Newlyn, Belfast and Poolbeg

The surfaces are modelled with respect to the terrestrial reference frame used for satellite navigation (GNSS) positioning, ETRS89. Thus VORF directly permits the use of high precision GNSS in hydrographic survey, and also allows the capability of transforming vertical data between the different datums. The UK Maritime & Coastguard Agency requires the use of VORF for tidal reductions as part of its civil hydrography programme.

== Files ==
A main product of the VORF project was the gridded vertical correction files which deliver the capability to transfer heights and depths from one vertical reference system to another, "allowing the direct use of depth data from surveys which is referred to a WGS84 compatible datum rather than Chart Datum and thus enabling Hydrographic surveyors to survey without the need to measure tides".

This is accomplished via a set of files, each file containing a grid of height corrections to apply to GNSS-derived heights to translate them to one of several VORF models. There is higher resolution in estuaries and inlets, but for most of the areas covered, there is a single height correction for each roughly 900 by 500 metre rectangle. VORF correction files are purchased from the same source as Admiralty charts.

=== Format ===
The Admiralty provides VORF data in the form of ".vrf" files, each of which contains data representing the separation between a given pair of datums. The filename indicates the VORF model version, the south-west corner of the area covered, and the pair of datums it represents.

The files can be bought and downloaded from the Admiralty Marine Data Portal, and are in plain text (ASCII) format, so can be viewed in any standard text editor. They contain a list of positions forming a regular grid. At each position the separation between the datums is given, and the uncertainty in this value. Positions are in decimal degrees and separation and uncertainty are in metres.

The grid resolution is 0.008° over the majority of the VORF area, which corresponds to boxes of approximately 900 x 500 metres. There is higher resolution (typically 0.002° to 0.0005°) around rivers and estuaries, and around Portland Bill. Where a file contains higher-resolution data, the high-resolution values are at the end of the file.

=== Pricing ===
The data are sold by the "block", with a VORF block covering an area of 0.088° latitude by 0.16° longitude. This makes each block about a 10 kilometre square (96 square kilometres), containing about 220 data points. The price (as at July 2021) starts at £216 per block, with discounts for quantity.

== Use ==
The VORF datum surfaces will generally be used by automated survey software, and for this purpose, it may be necessary to rearrange the data to create a suitable input file for the software in question. For example, software packages EIVA Navipac and Qinsy require specialised procedures.

== Development history ==
The VORF project ran from 2005 as a collaborative research project, sponsored by the UKHO, with a consortium comprising Proudman Oceanographic Laboratory, DTU, and led by University College London. It was delivered to the UKHO in 2008. VORF was developed using satellite altimetry, tide gauge observations, geoid and tidal modelling, and GNSS observations. VORF meets its target inshore accuracy of 10 cm in most of the domain of applicability.

== See also ==
- Admiralty chart – Nautical chart
- Hydrography – Measurement of bodies of water
- Hydrographic survey – Science of measurement and description of features which affect maritime activities
- Nautical chart – Topographic map of a maritime area and adjacent coastal regions
