= A View from Richmond Hill =

Painting by Jan Siberechts

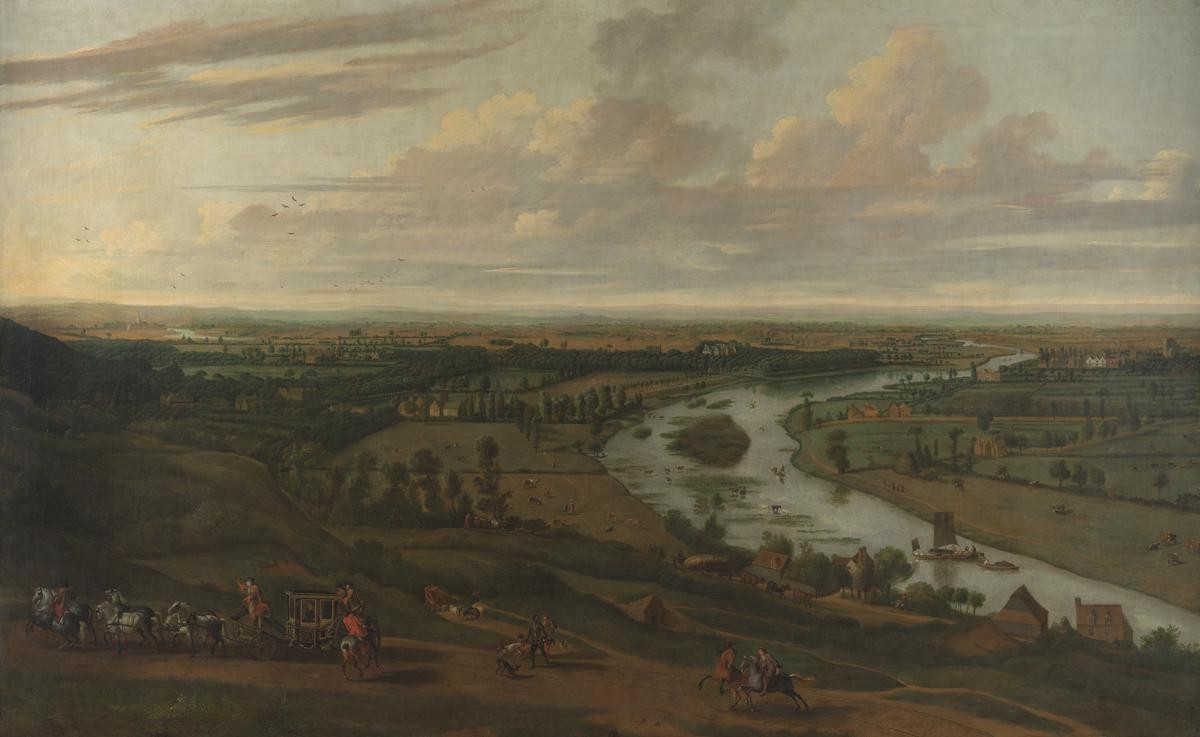
- Artist: Jan Siberechts
- Year: 1677
- Medium: Oil on canvas
- Dimensions: 230.2 cm × 387.9 cm (90.6 in × 152.7 in)
- Location: Tate Britain, London
- Website: www.tate.org.uk/art/artworks/

A View from Richmond Hill is a 1677 landscape painting by the Flemish artist Jan Siberechts. It depicts a view from Richmond Hill across the River Thames towards Twickenham where the tower of St Mary's Church is visible. Also included in the panorama are Petersham Meadows near the village of Petersham as well as Ham House. It was painted before Richmond became a fashionable riverside retreat for Londoners. The view would subsequently become a popular subject for artists over the following century and a half and this may have been the earliest

Siberechts had moved to England a few years earlier at a time when landscape painting was rapidly developing in the country. The work was likely commissioned by Elizabeth Maitland, Duchess of Lauderdale who owned Ham House and much of the surrounding land and is probably her carriage portrayed in the foreground. Today the painting is in the collection of the Tate Britain in Pimlico, having been acquired through acceptance in lieu in 2022.

== See also ==
- England: Richmond Hill, on the Prince Regent's Birthday, an 1819 painting by J.M.W. Turner

== Bibliography ==
- Baker, Charles Henry Collins. Dutch Painting of the Seventeenth Century. The Studio Limited, 1926.
- Hargreaves, Matthew. Great British Watercolors: From the Paul Mellon Collection at the Yale Center for British Art. Yale University Press, 2007.
