= Penelope Steel =

Jamaican-born British maritime publisher and cartographer

- Born: Penelope Winde c. 1768; Jamaica
- Died: c 1840; London, England
- Occupations: Cartographer, Publisher, Merchant
- Known for: Management of the Steel & Co. navigation warehouse; production of "blueback" sea charts.
- Spouse(s): David Steel the Younger (m. 1786; died 1803) William Mason (m. 1806)
- Parent(s): Scudamore Winde (father); Sarah Cox (mother)

Penelope Steel (née Winde; later Mason; c. 1768 – c. 1840) was a Jamaican-born merchant, publisher, and cartographer active in London during the early 19th century. She is noted for managing the Steel & Co. navigation warehouse, a major supplier of maritime charts and naval registers to the Royal Navy and merchant fleets. As a woman of colour in the Georgian era, her successful navigation of the male-dominated scientific publishing industry makes her a significant figure in British maritime history.

== Early life and Jamaican origins ==
Penelope Winde was born in Jamaica circa 1768. She was the daughter of Scudamore Winde, a wealthy Kingston merchant and member of the House of Assembly of Jamaica, and Sarah Cox, described in contemporary records as a "free woman of colour."

Her upbringing was shaped by the 1761 Act of the Assembly, a restrictive Jamaican law designed to curtail the wealth of the "free people of color." The act barred illegitimate children of mixed-race descent from inheriting real or personal property exceeding £2,000. To bypass these legal disabilities and ensure a higher social standing, wealthy fathers often sent their children to England - a similar history to that of Nathaniel Wells, the son of a white plantation owner by a Black woman. Under the guardianship of the London lawyer Robert Cooper Lee, Penelope and her half-brother were relocated to England for their education and upbringing.

== Career in cartography ==
In May 1786, Penelope married the barrister David Steel the Younger (1763–1803), whose father had established a "navigation warehouse" on Union Row, Little Tower Hill. Following her husband's death in January 1803, Penelope exercised her right under his will to continue the firm. Within a year, she was independently issuing charts and naval registers.

=== "P. Steel" imprint ===
By 1804, Penelope was issuing charts and naval registers under the imprint "P. Steel." She sustained the publication of the Original and Correct List of the Royal Navy and expanded the firm’s catalog of sea charts. Her firm was a prolific producer of "Blueback charts"—large-format maritime charts reinforced with blue paper for durability at sea.

Notable publications from her tenure include:

- Chart of the coasts of Spain and Portugal, from Cape Pinas to the Strait of Gibraltar (1804)
- The southern coast of Spain, from Cadiz to Cape de Palos, and the northern coast of Africa (1804)

=== Steel & Co. and relocation ===
In 1806, she married William Mason. While some publications briefly bore the imprint "P. Mason," she primarily traded as "P. Steel" or "Steel & Co." to maintain the established brand equity of her first husband's family. In 1809, she moved the business from Tower Hill to 70 Cornhill, near the Royal Exchange, where she continued to operate through the 1810s.

== Legacy ==
Penelope Steel died in 1840. For over a century, her contributions were largely attributed to the men in her family. Recent scholarship by maritime historians and curators at the National Maritime Museum has highlighted her role as a pioneering woman of colour who influenced the mapping of 19th-century England and the safety of global navigation.

== See also ==
- History of cartography
- Free people of colour
- Women in science
