= Penelope Brudenell, Countess of Cardigan =

Penelope Brudenell, Countess of Cardigan (born Penelope Anne Cooke; 14 February 1770 – 2 February 1826), was the wife of Robert Brudenell, 6th Earl of Cardigan. She served as a Lady of the Bedchamber to Charlotte of Mecklenburg-Strelitz, queen consort of King George III of the United Kingdom.

== Family ==
She was the daughter of George John Cooke, MP for Middlesex, and his wife, the former Penelope Bowyer, of Harefield Park, London. Their other daughter, Maria, married Maj.-Gen. Henry Charles Edward Vernon. It was not a wealthy family, but was well-known in military circles. Penelope's brother, Henry Frederick Cooke, nicknamed "Kangaroo", was a staff officer in the army during the Peninsular war and later became adjutant to Prince Frederick, Duke of York. Another brother, George Cooke, was in the Grenadier Guards, and a third, Edward, was killed in action during the French Revolutionary Wars.

=== Marriage and issue ===
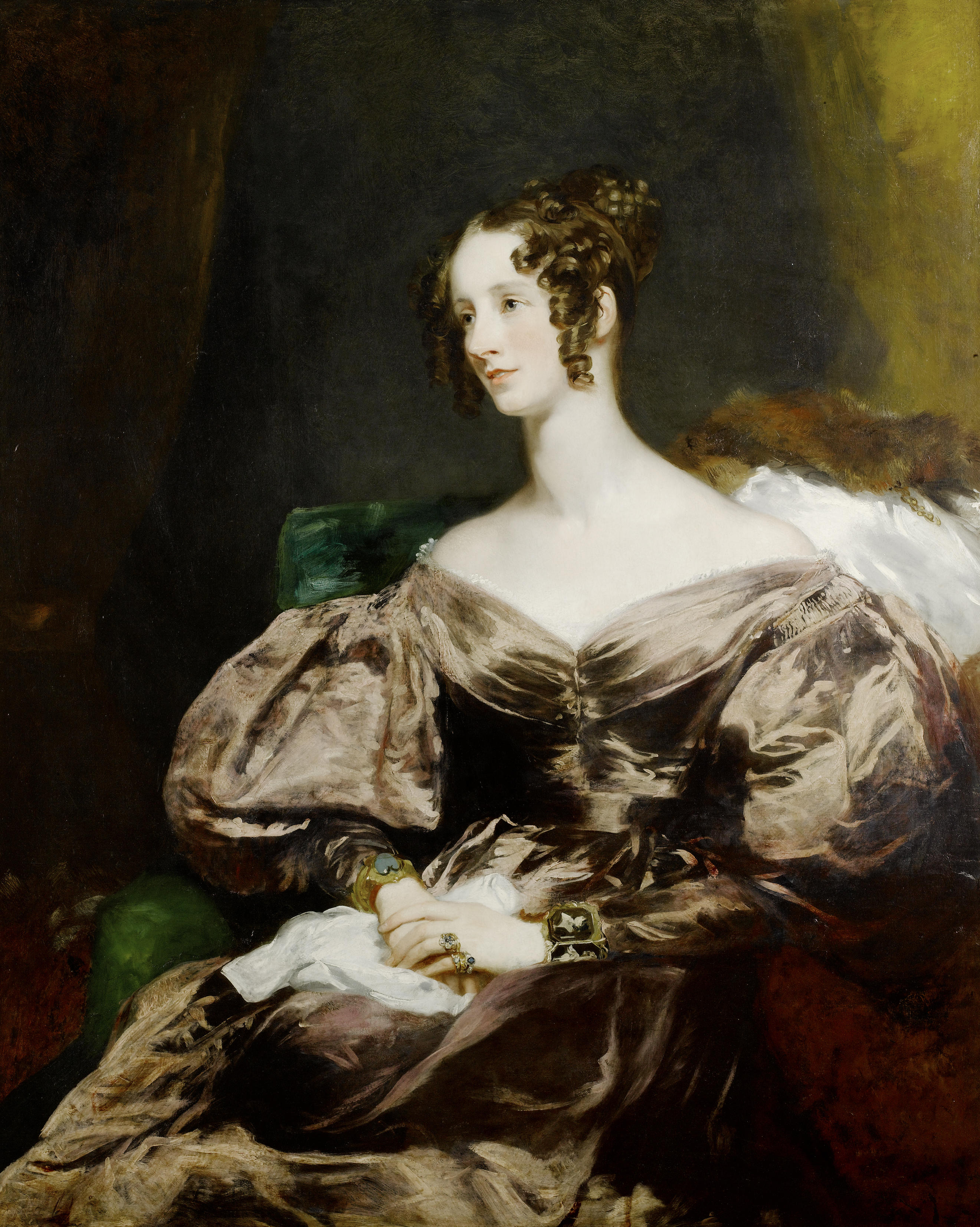
Portrait of Countess Howe by Margaret Sarah Carpenter, 1834.

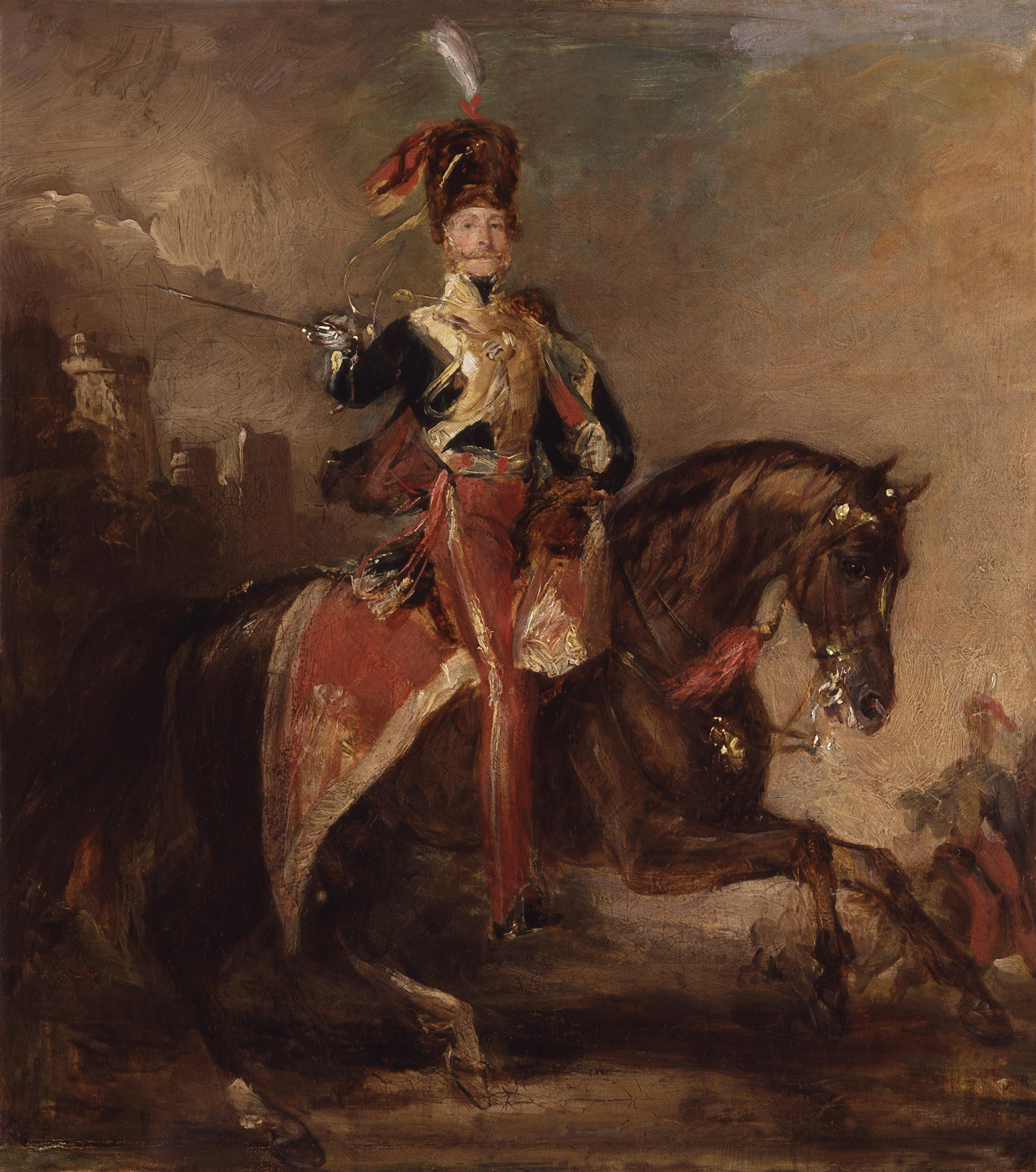
7th Earl of Cardigan by Francis Grant, 1841

Penelope married Robert Brudenell, MP, on 8 March 1794 at St. George's, Hanover Square, London. The marriage occurred despite the objections of Robert's uncle who opposed the wedding on the grounds of her lack of title and money. After their wedding, the couple moved to Buckinghamshire where they lived at the Manor in Hambleden, and where they were known as Mr. and Mrs. Brudenell, and not by their titles; Penelope occupied herself with the village and its school.

He succeeded his childless uncle, James Brudenell, 5th Earl of Cardigan, in the earldom in 1811. Their children were:

- Lady Harriet Georgiana Brudenell (died 1836), who married Richard William Penn Curzon-Howe, 1st Earl Howe, and had children; their descendant is the current Earl Howe, Frederick Curzon, 7th Earl Howe, who was deputy leader of the House of Lords under four Conservative governments,
- Lady Augusta Brudenell (died 1853), who married Major Henry Bingham Baring and had children; one of their descendants was the famous Poppy Baring of the Bright young things,
- Lady Elizabeth Anne Brudenell (c. 1796–1824), who married twice: first to the Hon. John Perceval, son of Charles George Perceval, 2nd Baron Arden, by whom she had children, and second to Reverend William John Brodrick, 7th Viscount Midleton, by whom she had no children
- Lt.-Gen. James Thomas Brudenell, 7th Earl of Cardigan (16 October 1797–1868), who led the historic Charge of the Light Brigade,
- Lady Charlotte Penelope Brudenell (c.1802–1879), who married Henry Sturt and had children, including Lord Alington, a notorious slum landlord in the East End of London,
- Lady Mary Brudenell (1806–1867), who married Henry Thomas Pelham, 3rd Earl of Chichester, and had children; Lord Chichester ordered the Charge of the Light Brigade,
- Lady Anne Brudenell (1809–1877), who married Field Marshal George Bingham, 3rd Earl of Lucan, and had children

Her only son, James, who succeeded his father as Earl of Cardigan, had a career in the military. It was said by contemporaries at the Barracks in Cork that he had a domineering manner as a result of having grown up in a predominantly female family. His brother-in-law ordered the infamous Charge of the Light Brigade, while he led it.

== Biography ==
On 12 August 1817 she hosted a birthday party for the Prince Regent at their country estate of Cardigan House on Richmond Hill. She borrowed part of the estate of the Duke of Wellington for the purpose. The scene was later the subject of a painting, Richmond Hill on the Prince Regent's Birthday, by the artist Turner.

In 1818 the countess was a lady of the bedchamber to Queen Charlotte. Queen Charlotte died in the same year. The countess died at Gopsall, Nottinghamshire, aged 55.
