= Blueback chart =

Privately published 19th-century maritime chart

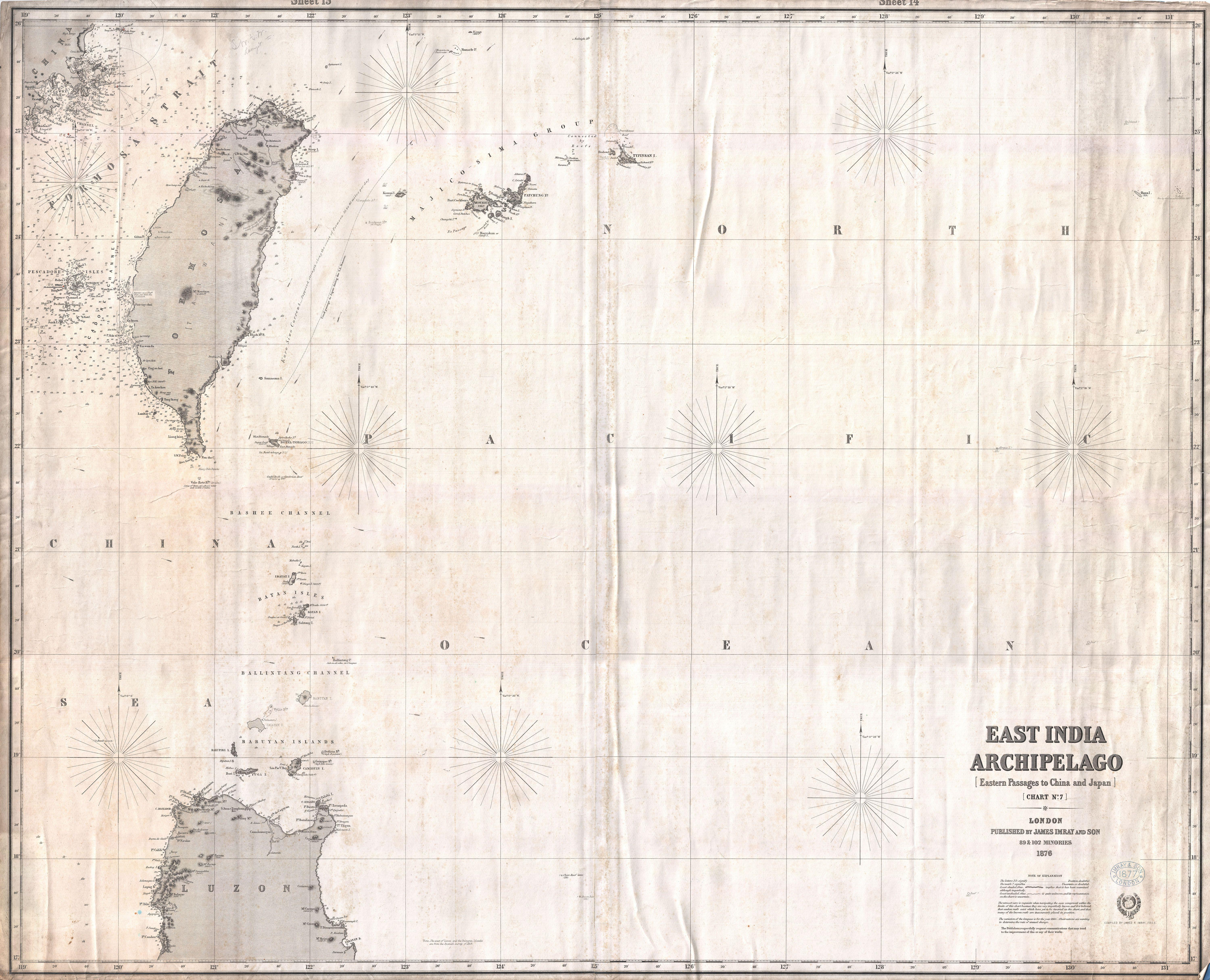
- An 1876 Imray blueback chart of Taiwan, showing the characteristic detail and scale of these private publications.
- Classification: Nautical chart

A blueback chart was a distinctive type of privately published nautical chart that became the standard for merchant mariners during the 19th century. They are named for the tough, blue manila paper used to reinforce the back of the charts, making them durable enough for use in the harsh conditions of a ship's bridge.

== History ==
During the late 18th century, the United Kingdom Hydrographic Office (part of the Admiralty) focused primarily on the needs of the Royal Navy. Merchant captains often found Admiralty charts too specialized or unavailable. This created a market for private "chart-sellers", with Mount & Page and Robert Sayer among the earliest producers of bluebacks (in 1760 and 1787 respectively). Many of these chart sellers were located in the City of London, particularly around Tower Hill and Cornhill.

Publishers - such as Sayer, John William Norie, James Imray, Penelope Steel (who took over the London business of her husband David Steel after he died in 1803), Mary Roberts, Janet Taylor, John Hamilton Moore, Robert Blachford, William Heather, R. H. Laurie, and John Hobbs - produced these charts to provide a "one-stop" navigational resource. By the mid-19th century, the blueback had become a global symbol of British maritime commercial influence.

Chart makers in France, Germany, the Netherlands, Russia, Scandinavia, Spain and the United States (including Edmund March Blunt and George Eldridge) also produced bluebacks.

=== Decline ===
The dominance of blueback charts began to wane in the late 19th century as government agencies, including the Admiralty's Hydrographic Office and the United States Coast Survey, improved their maps for merchant use. UK government's ability to update charts more frequently via Notices to mariners eventually made official charts more reliable than the privately updated bluebacks. By the early 20th century, many private firms merged or ceased production, though the firm of Imray, Laurie, Norie & Wilson continues to produce specialised charts for leisure sailors today.

== Construction and design ==
The defining feature of a blueback was its physical construction. Large engraved sheets of paper were glued onto a backing of heavy blue paper or linen. This reinforcement prevented the charts from tearing when rolled and protected them from dampness and salt spray.

=== Features ===
- Rhumb lines - extensive networks of lines indicating compass bearings for easier plotting
- Coastal profiles - detailed "silhouettes" of the coastline as seen from the sea to assist in land recognition
- Consolidation - Private publishers often combined multiple Admiralty surveys into a single, long "strip" chart for a specific trade route, such as London to the West Indies.

== Notable publishers ==
- John William Norie
- James Imray & Son
- Penelope Steel (Steel & Co.)
- Robert Sayer
- Laurie & Whittle

== See also ==
- History of cartography
- Hydrography
- Navigation
