= Chart datum =

Level of water from which depths displayed on a nautical chart are measured

U.S. civil and maritime uses of tidal data

A chart datum is the water surface serving as origin (or coordinate surface) of depths displayed on a nautical chart and for reporting and predicting tide heights. A chart datum is generally derived from some tidal phase, in which case it is also known as a tidal datum. Common chart datums are lowest astronomical tide (LAT) and mean lower low water (MLLW). In non-tidal areas, e.g., the Baltic Sea, mean sea level (MSL) is used.

A chart datum is a type of vertical datum and must not be confused with the horizontal datum for the chart. However, it is not necessarily an equigeopotential (a water "level surface"): the chart datum is tilted across smaller to larger tidal range regions; in rivers, it is a sloping and undulating surface following the low stage.

== Definitions ==
The following tidal phases are commonly used in the definition of chart datums.

=== Lowest and highest astronomical tide ===
Lowest astronomical tide (LAT) is defined as the lowest tide level which can be predicted to occur under average meteorological conditions and under any combination of astronomical conditions. Many national charting agencies, including the United Kingdom Hydrographic Office and the Australian Hydrographic Service, use the LAT to define chart datums.

One advantage of using LAT for chart datums is that all predicted tidal heights must then be positive (or zero) avoiding possible ambiguity and the need to explicitly state sign.

Calculation of the LAT only allows for gravitational effects so lower tides may occur in practice due to meteorological effects, such as high pressure systems.

The highest astronomical tide (HAT) can be defined similarly.

=== Mean high water ===
Mean high water (MHW) is the average of all the daily tidal high water levels observed over a period of several years. It is not the same as the normal tidal limit. In the United States this period spans 19 years and is referred to as the National Tidal Datum Epoch, currently 1983-2001 (expected to be updated to 2002-2020 by 2029), as used by the U.S. National Oceanic and Atmospheric Administration.

In Australia, the definition of the MHW is '...the line of the medium high tide between the highest tide of each lunar month (the springs) and the lowest each lunar month (the neaps) averaged over the year.'

=== Mean water ===
==== Mean lower low water ====
Mean lower low water (MLLW) is the average height of the lowest tide recorded at a tide station each day during a 19-year recording period, known as the National Tidal Datum Epoch. MLLW is only a mean, so some tidal levels may be negative relative to MLLW; see also #Mean low water springs. The 19-year recording period is the nearest full year count to the 18.6-year cycle of the lunar node regression, which has an effect on tides.

==== Lower low water large tide ====
This is an average of lowest low waters taken over a fixed period of tidal predictions, as opposed to actual observations. This is the datum used for coastal charts published by the Canadian Hydrographic Service, with the average taken from the lowest tides, one from each 19 year period of tidal predictions.

==== Mean higher high water ====
Similarly, the mean higher high water (MHHW) is the average height of the highest tide recorded at a tide station each day during the recording period. It is used, among other things as a datum from which to measure the navigational clearance, or air draft, under bridges.

=== Mean water spring ===
Spring tides are those when the moon is in a direct alignment with the sun (thus new or full) and in many extra-tropics places when its declination is 23.5°, its maximum. In equatorial, tropical seas, such as the Banda Sea such tides (bulges) occur when there is such an alignment and the declination of the moon is more towards its 0° average, thus more overhead or antiposed.

==== Mean low water springs ====
Mean low water springs (MLWS) is the average of the water levels of each pair of successive low waters during that period of about 24 hours in each semi-lunation (approximately every 14 days), when the tidal range is greatest (spring range).

==== Mean high water springs ====
Mean high water springs (MHWS) is the average highest level that spring tides reach over many years (often the last 19 years). Within this, to ensure anomalous levels are tempered, at least two successive high waters during the highest-tide 24 hours are taken.

Such a local level is generally close to the "high water mark" where debris accumulates on a tidal shore on about two days six months apart (and nearby days) annually. The levels are local as some places are nearer to or form places of almost no tides in and around each ocean (amphidromic points).

== Usage ==
=== Charts and tables ===
Charted depths and drying heights on nautical charts are given relative to chart datum. Some height values on charts, such as vertical clearances under bridges or overhead wires, may be referenced to a different vertical datum, such as mean high water springs or highest astronomical tide (HAT) (for "HAT" see tidal range).

Tide tables give the height of the tide above a chart datum making it feasible to calculate the depth of water at a given point and at a given time by adding the charted depth to the height of the tide. One may calculate whether an area that dries is under water by subtracting the drying height from the [given] height calculated from the tide table.

Using charts and tables not based on the same geodetic datum can result in incorrect calculation of water depths.

=== Satellite navigation ===
In recent years national hydrographic agencies have spearheaded developments to establish chart datum with respect to the Geodetic Reference System 1980 (GRS 80) reference ellipsoid, thus enabling direct compatibility with satellite navigation (GNSS) positioning. Examples of this include Vertical Offshore Reference Frames (VORF) for the United Kingdom Hydrographic Office (UKHO) and Bathyelli for Naval Hydrographic and Oceanographic Service (SHOM).

== See also ==
- Air draft
- Reference water levels
- Under-keel clearance
