= England: Richmond Hill, on the Prince Regent's Birthday =

Painting by J. M. W. Turner

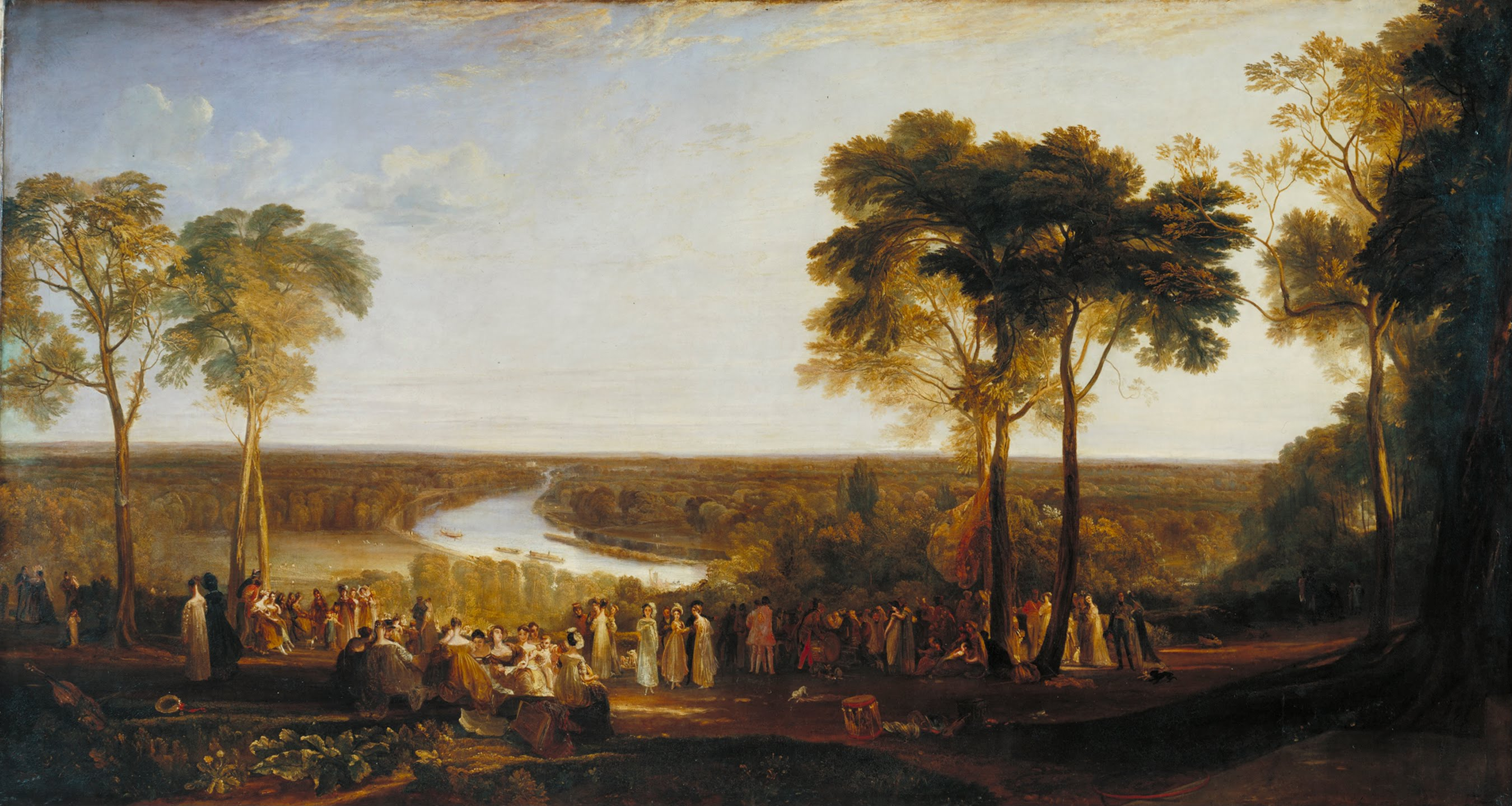
- Artist: J. M. W. Turner
- Year: 1819
- Type: Oil on canvas, landscape painting
- Dimensions: 180 cm × 334.5 cm (71 in × 131.7 in)
- Location: Tate Britain, London
- Website: tate.org.uk/...n00502

England: Richmond Hill, on the Prince Regent's Birthday is an 1819 painting by the English artist J. M. W. Turner. It was displayed at the 1819 Royal Academy Summer Exhibition at Somerset House, the largest work that Turner had yet presented. It depicts a real event on Richmond Hill hosted by Lady Cardigan at Cardigan House on 12 August 1817 to celebrate the birthday of the Prince Regent. Petersham Meadows by the bend in the River Thames is in the background. Just across the river in Twickenham was Turner's own house Sandycombe Lodge. Ham House is also visible in the distance. The work appears to show the Regent just off the canvas as several of the guests turn to look. Turner's biographer James Hamilton describes it as featuring "flighty Watteauesque figures, ideal evanescent trees, and a horizon so extended as to be unreal".

At 3.3 mt (11 ft, 5 in) wide, Richmond Hill is a very wide painting and few art collectors would have had such a large wall to fit this canvas adequately. The buyer Turner had in mind is none too subtly suggested: the Prince Regent himself, who would certainly have had many large empty walls to fill. This painting was the first of many others that Turner made hoping to entice a member of the Royal Family into buying them. Even though he was commissioned by the Royal House to paint The Battle of Trafalgar, it was finally rejected. None of his paintings entered the Royal Collection. The combination of his innovative style and choice of subjects, as well as his modest origins all played a part in this.

It is now in the Tate Britain, and was part of the Turner Bequest in 1856.

After completing the work Turner embarked on a lengthy visit to Italy which significantly altered his style concerning the use of light.

== See also ==
- List of paintings by J. M. W. Turner
- A View from Richmond Hill, a 1677 painting by Jan Siberechts

== Bibliography ==
- Finley, Gerald. Angel in the Sun: Turner's Vision of History. McGill–Queen's University Press, 1999.
- Hamilton, James. Turner - A Life. Sceptre, 1998.
- Neset, Arne. Arcadian Waters and Wanton Seas: The Iconology of Waterscapes in Nineteenth-century Transatlantic Culture. Peter Lang, 2009.
