= Ken Shuttleworth =

Ken Shuttleworth may refer to:

- Ken Shuttleworth (architect) (born 1952), English architect
- Ken Shuttleworth (cricketer) (1944–2025), English Test cricketer
