= 5 Broadgate =

Office building in London

Coordinates: 51.5194°N 0.0830°W

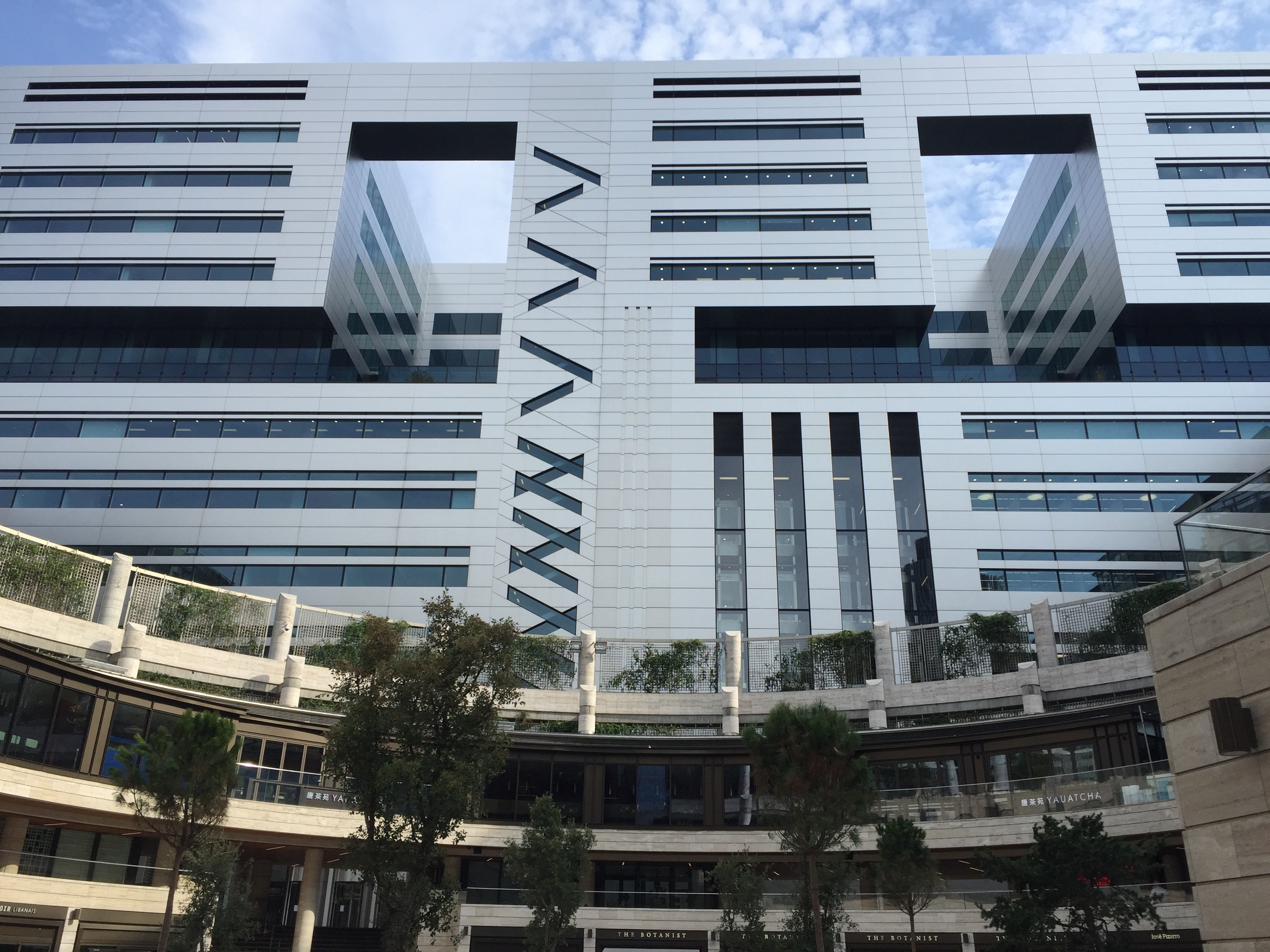
5 Broadgate in August 2016

5 Broadgate is a groundscraper in the City of London. It serves as the British headquarters of Swiss bank UBS, the world's largest private bank, and was designed by Ken Shuttleworth of Make Architects. It is notable for its unique smooth steel façade with horizontal, diagonal, and vertical strips of windows, designed to look like an engine block. The building is currently owned by the National Pension Service of Korea, which purchased the building in March 2022 together with LaSalle Investment Management.

== Design ==
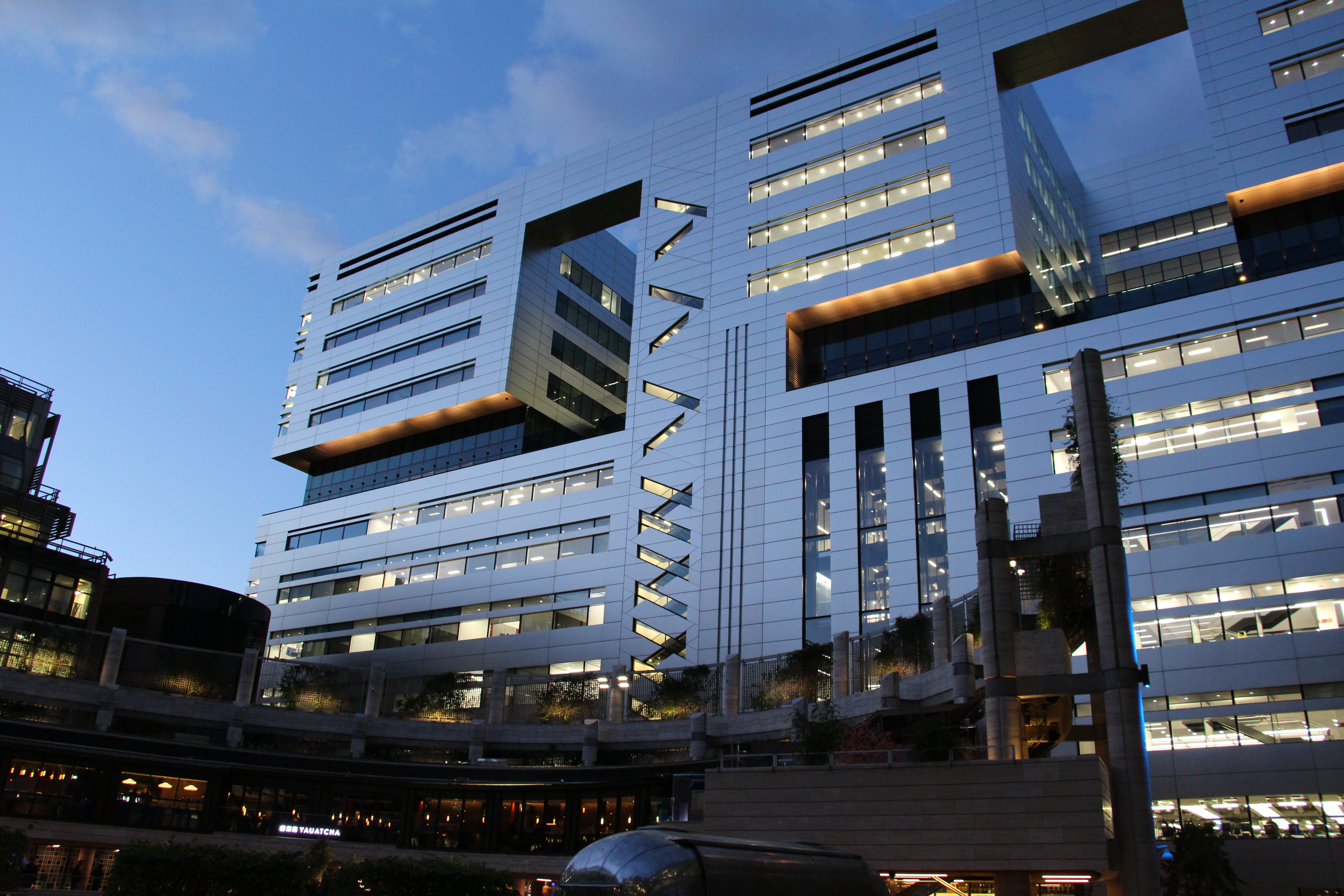
5 Broadgate at night

5 Broadgate contains 700,000 square feet (65,000 m^{2}) of office space over 13 storeys adjacent to Liverpool Street station. Its façade is made of stainless steel. Built by Seele to resemble "a giant engine block", the 34,000 square metres (370,000 sq ft) exterior is made up of 8,000 elements, including steel panels up to 9 square metres (97 sq ft) in size. The building is 60 metres (200 ft) high at its corners, as tall as the other buildings on the Broadgate estate. Only about 35% of the façade contains glazing for heat insulation. The exterior contains horizontal, diagonal and vertical strips of windows. The horizontal windows generally overlook the offices, the vertical windows are near the lift shafts, and the diagonal windows are adjacent to the exit stairs. 5 Broadgate features open terraces on higher stories, and it has a large 5 carved into its exterior on the ground floor.

The two lowest storeys contain a 200-seat auditorium, restaurants, a gym, and a dry cleaner. Above those are four trading floors which can fit 3,000 people each, as well as seven storeys of offices above. The superstructure is divided into a grid of 13.5-by-12-metre (44 by 39 ft) sections, arranged around the trading floors. Three of the building's four utility cores are placed along the site perimeter to increase the amount of space on each trading floor. The slab-to-slab distance, or the height between different storeys' floor slabs, is 5 metres (16 ft) on the trading floors. This provides space for an underfloor plenum system, which contains pipes that provide chilled water to the workstations. Directly above the highest trading floor is a service floor. The next two storeys are used for client meetings and contain terraces and atriums. The top four storeys are used as conventional offices.

The building occupies the site of two former buildings. As part of the agreement with the City of London, the former pedestrian path between the two buildings has been closed for security reasons, and businesses at the base of the building have been banned. About 5,400 people work at 5 Broadgate, 3,000 of which are UBS employees, while the remainder are support staff. According to The Independent, the UBS Cleaning Academy ensured that the washrooms were durable enough to withstand emotional outbursts by traders.

5 Broadgate was designed to be environmentally friendly and has received a BREEAM Excellent rating, placing it in the "top 10% of UK new non-domestic buildings". The building was built of 39% recycled materials, and 99% of construction waste was "diverted from landfill". In addition to 7,500 square feet of green roof space, 5 Broadgate also claims to have the largest array of solar panels in the City of London on its roof. It is also said to have 65% lower carbon emissions than the two buildings it replaced.

== Ownership and tenants ==
5 Broadgate was developed by the British Land Company and completed in 2015, upon which UBS moved into its offices. UBS reportedly paid almost £500 million for the building, and is committed to leasing the property until at least 2035. The building was purchased by Hong Kong-based CK Asset Holdings Ltd. in June 2018 for £1 billion, using funds from its sale of The Center, a skyscraper in Hong Kong.

In March 2022, CK Asset sold 5 Broadgate to the National Pension Service of Korea and LaSalle Investment Management for about £1.21 billion, amid rising demand for office space in London. The deal was the most expensive non-tower real estate deal ever to take place in London, and the overall most expensive deal since the 2017 sale of 20 Fenchurch Street to Lee Kum Kee for £1.3 billion, according to Colliers, a real-estate firm that advised CK Asset. When the deal was first reported by Bloomberg in December 2021, soon after it had been agreed, it allegedly valued 5 Broadgate at £1.25 billion, surpassing competing bids by Bright Ruby Resources, a company owned by Chinese billionaire Du Shuanghua, and Mubadala Investment Company, a sovereign wealth fund of the Emirate of Abu Dhabi. The sale of 5 Broadgate represented a total return on investment, including property appreciation and rent, of 45%, or HK$4.8 billion, for CK Asset; this reportedly represented a yield of 3.6%.

In November 2022, accountancy firm Grant Thornton agreed to sublease two floors at 5 Broadgate from UBS, consisting of just under 105,000 square feet (9,800 m^{2}) of office space, at £70 per square foot, a rate similar to the rent paid by UBS. UBS had initially announced their intention to sublet two floors at £75 per square foot in July 2022, as hybrid working policies had left large amounts of office space unused. Grant Thornton will move its UK headquarters from their current location at 30 Finsbury Square to 5 Broadgate, a distance of around 300 meters, "from mid to late 2024 onwards".

== Reception ==
In a 2011 review for The Guardian, Rowan Moore criticised the design of 5 Broadgate for failing to blend in with its surroundings, calling it "an aloof fortress that ignores its responsibilities to the wider community", "defensive-aggressive", and an "expression of power". He criticized the use of a sheer metal façade, in contrast to the layered stone structures previously occupying the space. Moore speculated that the dependence of the British economy, and the City of London in particular, on large financial institutions helped UBS win concessions from City planners, such as the removal of a public walkway and businesses on the ground floor for security reasons. The building was shortlisted for Building Design magazine's 2016 Carbuncle Cup for the ugliest new building in the United Kingdom.

A 2015 article in The Independent by Jay Merrick was less critical, saying "The City, more than anywhere else in London, craves striking new buildings". However, Merrick acknowledges that the demolition of two existing buildings and their replacement with the massive steel facade of 5 Broadgate was controversial. Potential opposition to the design prompted City Planning Officer for the City of London Peter Rees to keep the designs confidential until they were submitted for planning approval.
