= Aspire (sculpture) =

Sculpture by Ken Shuttleworth

Coordinates: 52.9512°N 1.1844°W

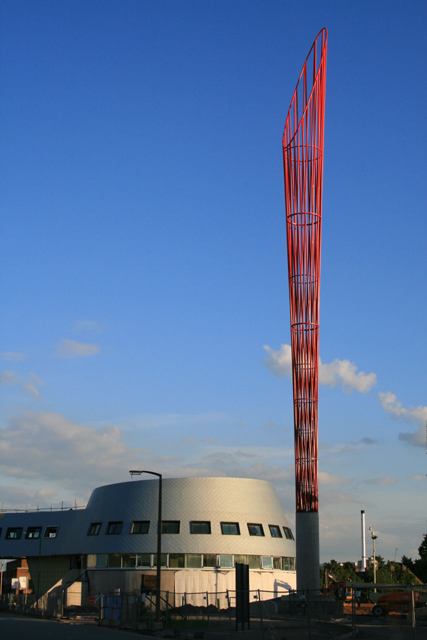
- Artist: Ken Shuttleworth
- Year: 2008
- Type: Hyperboloid structure
- Medium: Steel
- Dimensions: 60 m (200 ft); 4.820 m diameter (15.81 ft)
- Weight: 854 tonnes
- Location: Nottingham, England
- Owner: University of Nottingham

Aspire is a work of art, constructed on the Jubilee Campus of the University of Nottingham, in Nottingham, England. It is a 60-metre (200 ft) tall, red and orange steel sculpture, and was, until overtaken by Anish Kapoor's Orbit, the tallest free standing public work of art in the United Kingdom. It is taller than B of the Bang (which was dismantled in 2009), Nelson's Column, the Angel of the North, and the Statue of Liberty (excluding the pedestal). The name Aspire was chosen after a competition to name the sculpture, which was open to staff and students at the university.

== Design and fabrication ==
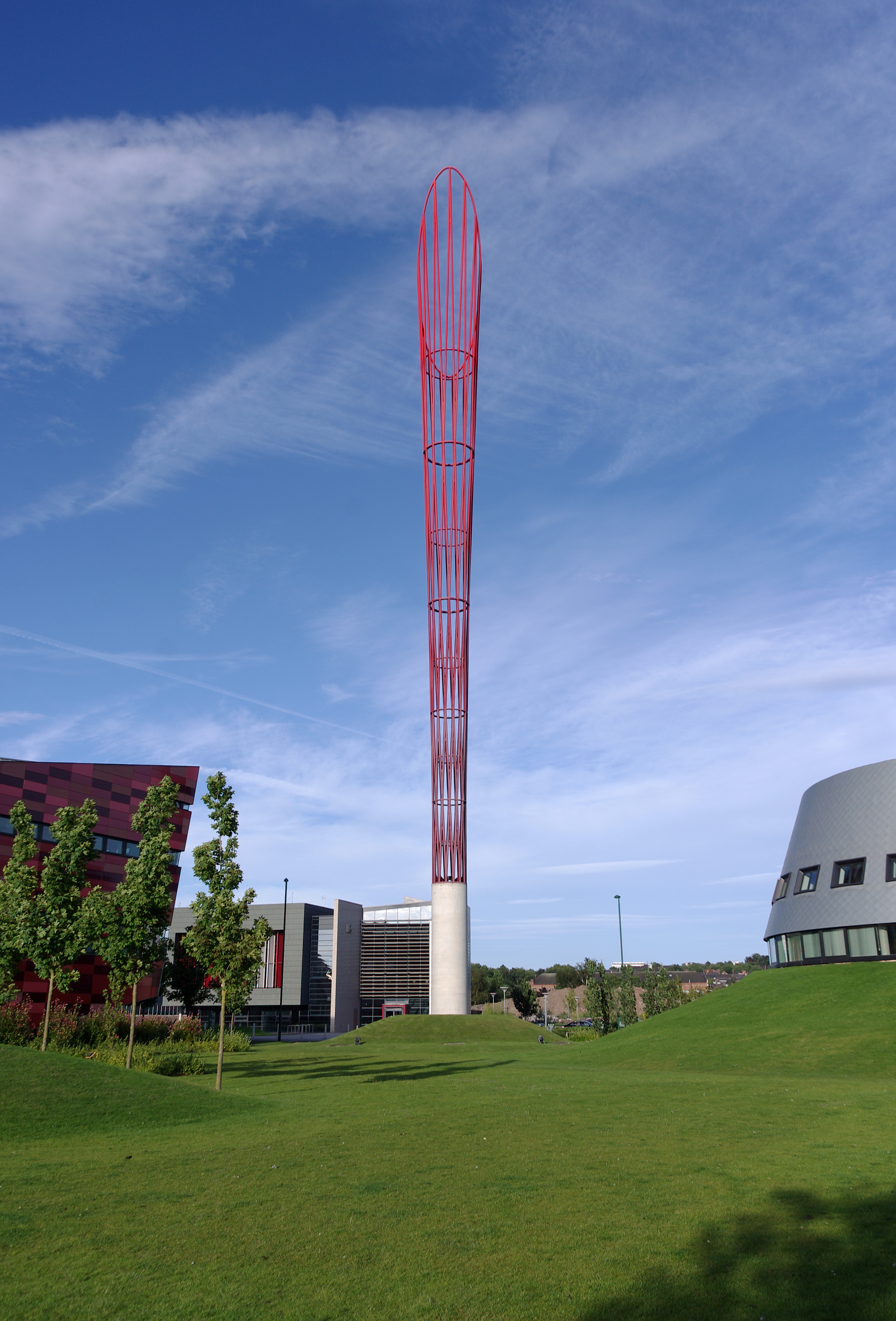
Aspire towers above all other buildings in the area

Aspire is a type of hyperboloid structure, designed by Ken Shuttleworth and Make Architects. It consists of an 8 m (26 ft) high concrete foundation and 52 m (171 ft) high red and orange steel tower. The sculpture weighs 854 tonnes, and cost £800,000, which was donated by an anonymous benefactor. The sculpture is lit during the hours of darkness.

Fabrication of the sculpture took 23 weeks and was completed by Watson Steel Structures in Bolton, Greater Manchester. It was then transported to Widnes, Cheshire, where Merseyside Coatings Ltd applied the distinctive red and orange colour scheme. The structure was fabricated in three parts and lifted onto the concrete foundation by cranes on-site.
