= Amory Tower =

Skyscraper in London, England

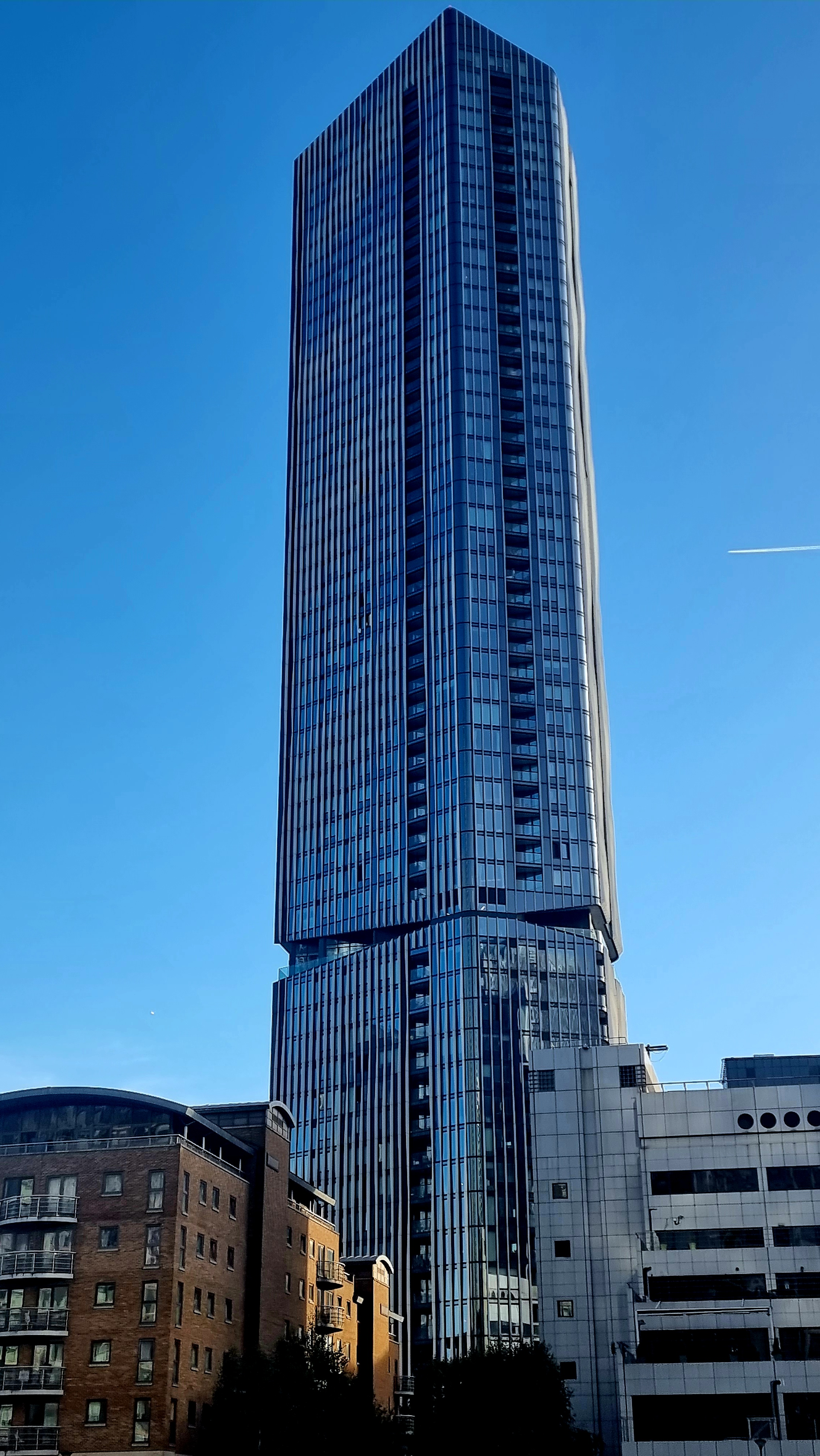
- Amory Tower in October 2024
- Interactive map of the Amory Tower area
- Former names: The Madison; Meridian Gate
- Alternative names: 199–207 Marsh Wall

General information
- Status: Completed
- Type: Mixed
- Location: London, E14; England, 203 Marsh Wall, Tower Hamlets
- Coordinates: 51.5001°N 0.0137°W
- Construction started: 2016
- Completed: 2021
- Owner: LBS Properties

Height
- Height: 182 m (597 ft)

Technical details
- Floor count: 55
- Floor area: 477,000 ft^{2} (44,300 m^{2})

Design and construction
- Architecture firm: Make Architects

Amory Tower (previously called The Madison) is a mixed-use skyscraper situated south of Wood Wharf and east of South Quay Plaza on the Isle of Dogs in London, England.

The building was designed by British architecture firm Make Architects. Standing at 182 metres (597 ft), as of April 2026, it is the 22nd-tallest building in the United Kingdom.

In 2022 the tower won the Best Residential Tall Building at the 2022 Tall Building Awards.

== History ==
=== Planning ===
An initial planning application was submitted to Tower Hamlets Council on 4 July 2014, then known as Meridian Gate. However, on 6 August 2014 the Mayor of London's office raised concerns, feeling as though it did not comply with the London Plan. The development was approved in 2015.

=== Construction ===
Construction of the tower began in 2016. During construction, the development produced a new combined access solution for the company Brogan Group: the CAS tower and Colossus Hoist. This system was essential for the efficient lifting of large materials and personnel, especially the unique pods that had to be placed into the building. The project marked the first time the company used these two innovative systems together. In 2021 construction of Amory Tower was completed.

== Design ==
According to Make Architects, the fin-clad facade's moiré pattern was influenced by the surrounding docklands. The tower features 423 homes with 100 of these classed as "affordable".

In terms of amenities, the cut-throughs in the facade create amenity space. The tower includes a private club facility on the 16th floor, a gym, pool and a spa. Around 70% of the development's footprint is covered by public parks and gardens.

== Gallery ==
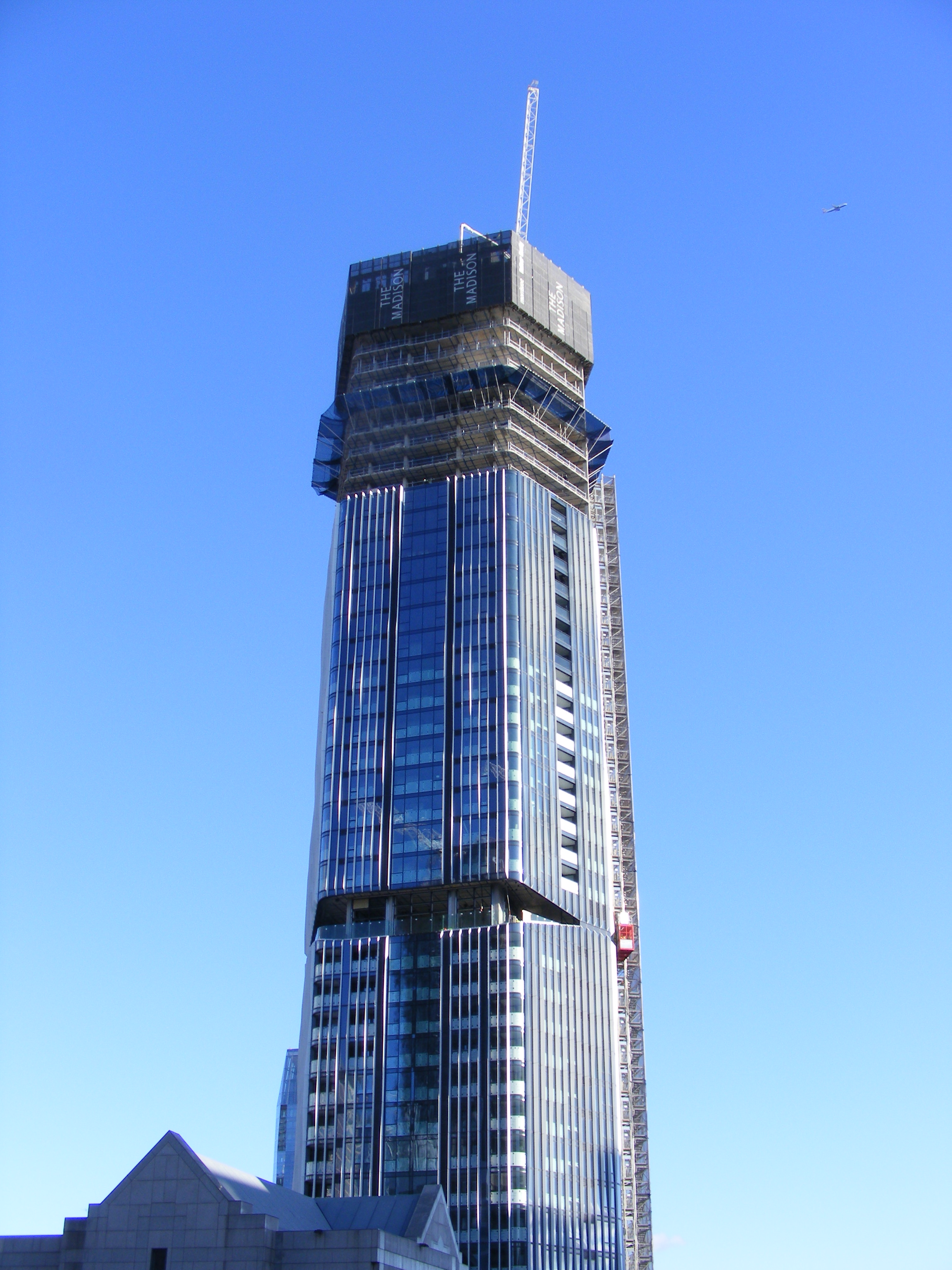
Amory Tower under construction in January 2019

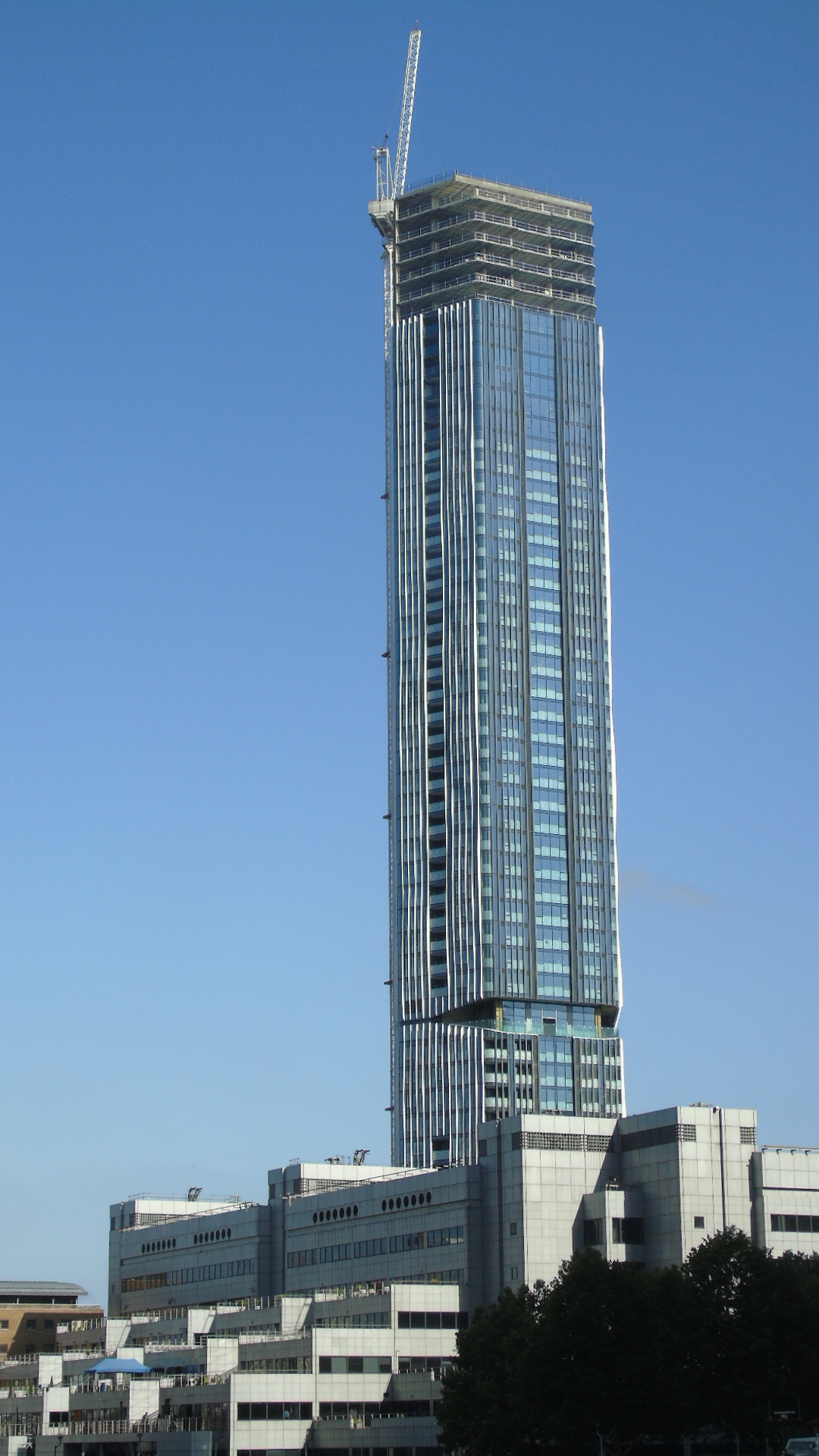
Amory Tower under construction in June 2019

== See also ==
- List of tallest buildings and structures in London
- List of tallest buildings in the United Kingdom
