= Thomas Clarkson Academy =

Location
- Corporation Road; Wisbech, Cambridgeshire, PE13 2SE; England
- Coordinates: 52.65518°N 0.16402°E

Information
- Type: Academy
- Established: June 2012
- Trust: Brooke Weston Trust
- Department for Education URN: 137867 Tables
- Ofsted: Reports
- Principal: Matthew Dobbing
- Gender: Mixed
- Age: 11 to 18
- Enrolment: 1220
- Capacity: 1400
- Website: www.thomasclarksonacademy.org

Thomas Clarkson Academy is a mixed secondary school and sixth form located in Wisbech, Cambridgeshire, England. A new school building has been constructed that was designed by Ken Shuttleworth and Make Architects.

Formerly the Queen's School, it was established following the merger of the secondary modern Queen's Girls' School and Queen's Boys' School in the 1970s. It was renamed Thomas Clarkson Community College in 2007 under the Fresh Start programme following an Ofsted report that judged it to be a 'failing school'. It is named after Thomas Clarkson, the Wisbech-born abolitionist and leading campaigner against the slave trade in the British Empire.

The school was converted to academy status in June 2012 and was renamed Thomas Clarkson Academy. As an academy, the school is sponsored by Brooke Weston Trust.

It offers a range of GCSEs and BTECs to pupils as courses of study. Sixth form have options to study a range of A Levels and BTECs.

== The Campus ==
The completed £32m Thomas Clarkson Academy building in Wisbech – based on a plan of blocks a Fibonacci sequence, is built largely in cross-laminated timber or CLT, with facades of banded brick. The building uses passive and active energy saving measures. The building is built on a grand scale, and set on a large school site, with many specifically designated outside areas for sport, and all weather pitches. It was designed to facilitate out of school use by local clubs.

The building is light and spacious and all of the indoor facilities are contained under one roof. These include general use classrooms, specialist classrooms, computer suites, laboratories and workshops. More spectacularly there is a three-storey climbing wall, a planted living wall, a 450-seater theatre, dance and drama studios, sports halls and a Library Resource Centre

== Description ==
Ofsted describes this as a good school. It offers a range of GCSEs and BTECs to pupils as courses of study. Sixth form have options to study a range of A Levels and BTECs.

Leaders have high expectations of all pupils and what they can achieve. Relationships between staff and pupils are very positive. Staff increasingly motivate pupils to work hard and try their best. Sixth-form students want to learn, and adults prepare them well for their future. Students are good role models to younger pupils.

=== Lower school ===
Students enter the school at the age of eleven and are placed in a pastoral community. There are three. They join a form group within year 7. They do many of their lessons with that form, and the form program handles the SMSC requirement of the National Curriculum. Otherwise, as the aim of the curriculum is to develop successful learners, confident individuals and responsible citizens, there is a strong focus on the core subjects; English, Maths and Science. This is complemented with the compulsory study of Humanities (History, Geography, Religious Education), Physical Education, Design Technology (Product Design, Food, Textiles), and Expressive Arts (Art, Drama, Dance, Music). In Year 9 preparations are made for the transition to Key Stage 4, and GCSEs. Students are encouraged, to maximise their academic potential by studying the EBacc (English Baccalaureate) suite of subjects. Students are expected to get involved in an after school club three days a week. These include sports. Duke of Edinburgh Award Scheme and a cross trust Combined Cadet Force.

=== Sixth form ===
The aim of the Sixth Form is to help students to gain the qualifications needed for their future learning and careers.
