= InterContinental Shanghai Wonderland =

Five-star hotel in Shanghai

- Interactive map of InterContinental Shanghai Wonderland
- Location: Shimao Wonderland, 5188 Chen Hua Rd at Ding Yuan Rd, Songjiang District, Shanghai; 31°3′37″N 121°8′58″E
- Opened: 20 November 2018
- Theme: Aquatic
- No. of rooms: 337
- Signature attractions: The quarry pit, Chenshan Botanic Garden, Tianmashan Country Club, Shenshan Mountain, Tianmashan Mountain
- Owner: Shimao Group
- Operating license holder: InterContinental
- Architect: JADE + QA –JADE + Quarry Associates; ECADI – East China Architectural Design & Research Institute CO., Ltd.; Atkins
- Website: www.ihg.com/intercontinental/hotels/us/en/shanghai/shghe/hoteldetail

The InterContinental Shanghai Wonderland (Chinese: 上海洲际世茂仙境酒店; pinyin: Shànghǎi Zhōujì Shìmào Xiānjìng Jiǔdiàn), also known as the Tianma Pit Hotel, Shimao Quarry Hotel, Songjiang, or Pit Pegasus Hotel (Chinese: 天馬深坑大酒店), is a hotel and earthscraper in Songjiang, Shanghai, China, 50 kilometres (30 miles) from city center. The hotel, which started operations on 20 November 2018, is managed by InterContinental and was built on the site of an abandoned quarry and, notably, features some rooms underwater.

The design and construction process of the hotel was fraught with many delays prior to 2013. Since 2013, however, design and construction progressed at a fairly swift pace. The fit-out work was carried out in 2017, and the hotel finally opened on 20 November 2018.

== History ==
The InterContinental Hotels Group is behind the project as one of its flagship hotels in the country under the banner of Shimao Wonderland InterContinental. The design was shortlisted for an award at the World Architecture Festival in 2009. According to Shanghaiist, the Shanghai Shimao Property Group has an investment of US$555 million in the project. It opened on 20 November 2018.

=== Construction ===
The concept and facade design firm for this project is JADE+QA, led by Martin Jochman, who designed the concept while working with ATKINS and in 2013 set up his own practice in Shanghai and continued working on this project directly for the developer Shimao with his own studio JADE+QA. The local architectural firm is ECADI (East China Architectural Design & Research Institute Co., Ltd.), which is responsible for design development, construction documents, structural design and MEP. The interior design firms are CCD (Cheng Chung Design) and AB Concept. The lighting design consultant is Illuminate Lighting Design.

The hotel is 18 stories, 16 of which are below ground level including two projected underwater floors; two of the floors are above the 88m deep quarry. The abandoned quarry is partially filled with water to create an artificial lake. The hotel is designed in an "S" shape utilizing a convex to concave form. The architects' vision is one of sequential hanging gardens that will produce the effect of a green hill extending down the face of the quarry. Both the quarry's rock face and the wings of the blocks of guest rooms are projected to surround an atrium within the hotel. The vertical atrium made of glass resembles an artificial waterfall. Gizmag called the waterfall the "pièce de résistance" of the project. The site also has a glass walkway 87 meters above the ground coming out of the quarry cliff.

== Facilities ==
The project would include facilities for extreme sports, a visitor centre and a five-star hotel with some underwater rooms. The hotel has 337 rooms as well as conference facility for up to 1,000 people, a grand ballroom and restaurants and cafes on the ground floor above the hotel. There are two underwater floors, the lower one of which will feature MEP installation and the upper one with guest rooms and a restaurant facing an aquarium with a depth of five metres.

== Pricing ==
Rooms were expected to be priced at a minimum of US $500 per night, however, in 2020 the rooms are priced in the US $360 range.
