= Earthscraper =

Deep underground habitable building

An earthscraper is a building that provides multiple stories of permanent space below ground where people may live: the inverse of very tall high-rise buildings. Though humans have been building structures underground for centuries, such dwellings are generally called Earth shelters, and typically are only one or two stories deep at most. It is the number or depth of below ground stories that distinguish an earthscraper.

An earthscraper might have some exposed sides, such as one built in a quarry with open exposure on some sides for lighting or ventilation purposes.

== Definition ==
The term "earthscraper" was first applied to buildings that had continuously habitable space, as measured in stories, below ground, though no clear number of stories has been applied to the word. The word does not refer to, or count, the very deep foundations that are often required of skyscrapers in order to anchor and balance such tall structures—such as the Shanghai Tower which has foundations 282 feet (86 m) deep. Deep parking garages, defensive bunkers, shelters, or buildings other than habitable structures designed with the same sort of purpose as a skyscraper, are not considered earthscrapers.

== History ==
The first known earthscraper that was both proposed and then subsequently completed was the InterContinental Shanghai Wonderland. This property was first unveiled in 2013, experienced significant delays initially due to the novel nature of its construction, but then finally was completed in 2018. This hotel earthscraper property has 16 underground stories, and two additional stories aboveground, making it 18 stories in total. This design presents opportunities for developers to transform unused landmasses, such as an old, abandoned quarry in the case of the Intercontinental Shanghai, and turn them into functional land use.

Earthscrapers have also been thought of as a way to deal with urban planning issues such as overcrowding, historically the notion of "building up" was thought of as the solution when space was scarce and at a premium, however neighborhood externalities such as a tall building casting shade over other previously existing properties arise, issues which may not be problems with an earthscraper.

A 65-story deep earthscraper was proposed in 2011 to be built in Mexico City's central plaza, a region called "Zócalo", though as of 2023 no such earthscraper has been completed, and was promptly cancelled shortly thereafter.

== Environmental impact compared to skyscrapers ==
Earthscrapers have been proposed as a means to deal with the effects of climate change, and to make human living less harmful on the external environment. This may be different from skyscrapers, which some critics allege are not good for the environment or for climate change. Some of the reasons that earthscrapers might be considered an improved option for large-scale human dwellings in urban environments over skyscrapers include the massively reduced cost of heating, or cooling, a large structure that is built mostly underground. Also, the amount of steel required in a skyscraper is enormous due to it needing to support its own weight, something an earthscraper does not need to do. Though an earthscraper still would still require large amounts of steel and concrete, it also has the support of the surrounding earth upon which the outer walls and frame can rest.

== See also ==
- Groundscraper
- Earth shelter
- Underground living
- Fallout shelter
- Seascraper
- Hobbit hole
