= Groundscraper =

Type of building

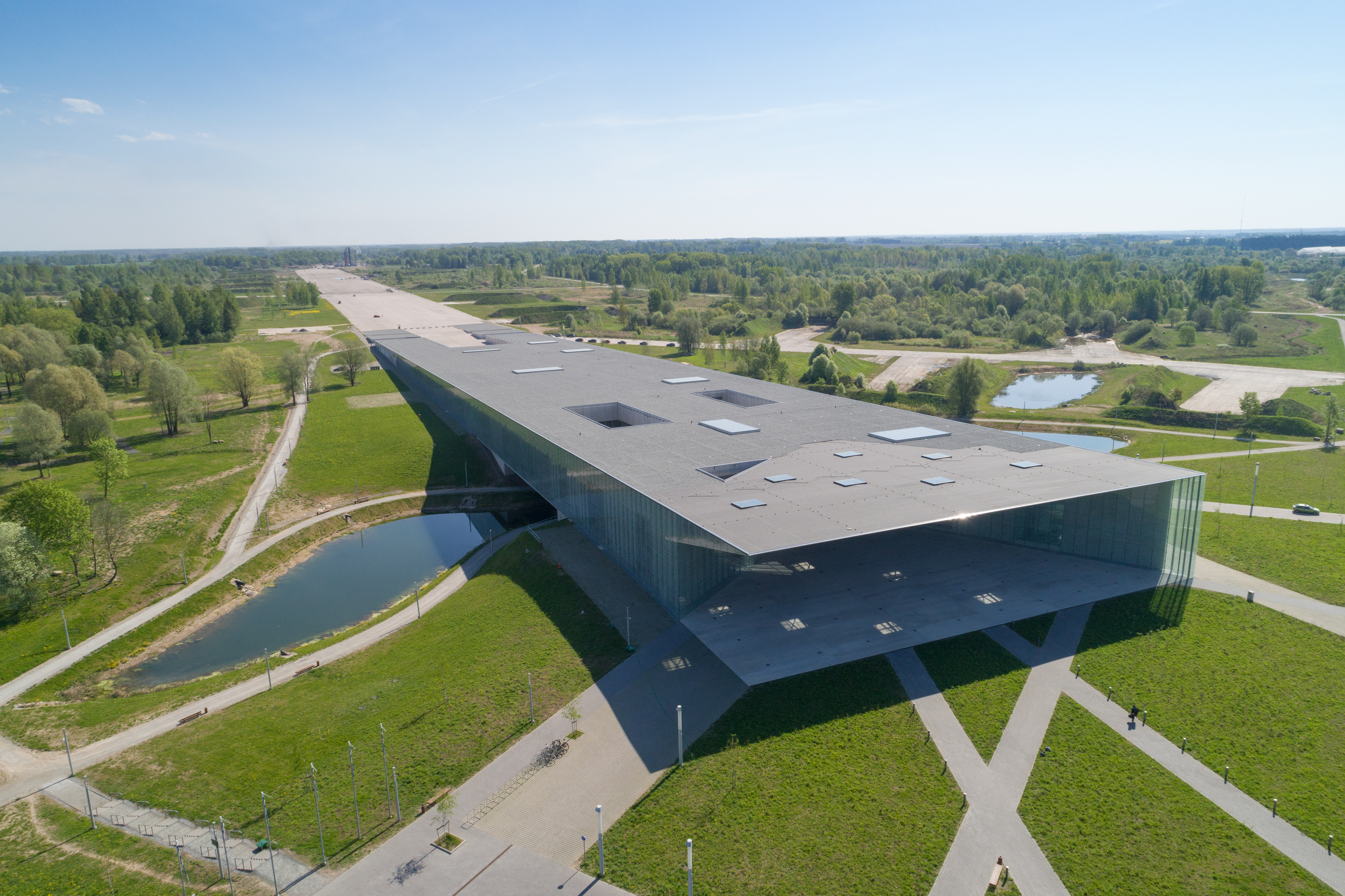
The main building of the Estonian National Museum has only one floor, but a footprint of over 20,000 square meters.

A groundscraper is a large building that has relatively few stories but which greatly extends horizontally.

== Definition ==
Encarta defines groundscraper as "a large low or medium-rise building, typically containing offices, that spreads horizontally and occupies a large amount of land".

== Examples ==
- 5 Broadgate, a groundscaper owned by Swiss bank UBS, was once the largest office building in the City of London.
- Apple Park, the corporate headquarters of Apple Inc. in Cupertino, California, consists of one four-story circular building of approximately 0.26 km^{2} (64 acres)
- Central Yards, Hong Kong
- Horizontal Skyscraper – Vanke Center in Shenzhen is as large as the Empire State Building, but is laid out horizontally and five stories above ground level. A park occupies the space below.
- SAS Frösundavik Office Building

== See also ==
- Earthscraper
- Seascraper
- Skyscraper
- List of largest buildings
