= The Cube, Birmingham =

Mixed use building in West Midlands, England

The Cube
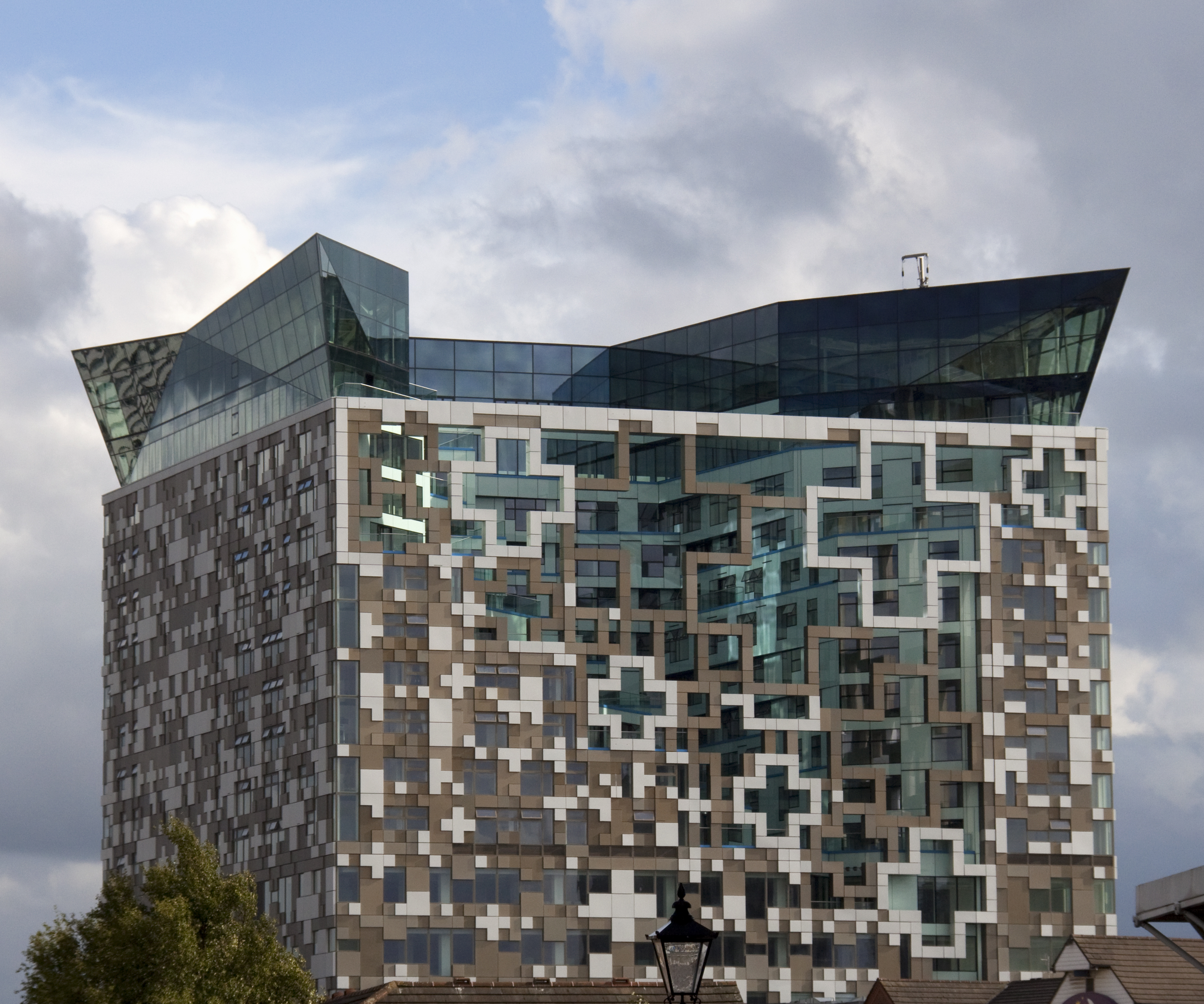
- Interactive map of the The Cube area

General information
- Status: Completed
- Type: Mixed use – office, retail, residential, hotel
- Location: Birmingham, West Midlands, England
- Coordinates: 52.4750°N 1.9070°W
- Construction started: 2007
- Completed: 2010
- Cost: £100 million

Height
- Roof: 70.4 m (231 ft)

Technical details
- Floor count: 24
- Floor area: 450,000 square feet (41,806 m^{2})

Design and construction
- Architect: Ken Shuttleworth
- Architecture firm: Make Architects
- Developer: Birmingham Development Company
- Structural engineer: Buro Happold
- Main contractor: BuildAbility

The Cube is a 24-storey mixed-use development in the centre of Birmingham, England. Designed by Ken Shuttleworth of Make Architects, it contains 244 flats, 111,500 square feet (10,359 m^{2}) of offices, shops, a hotel and a 'skyline' restaurant. It is the final phase of The Mailbox development.

The site is enclosed by The Mailbox complex, Commercial Street, Washington Wharf apartment complex and the Worcester & Birmingham Canal.

== History ==
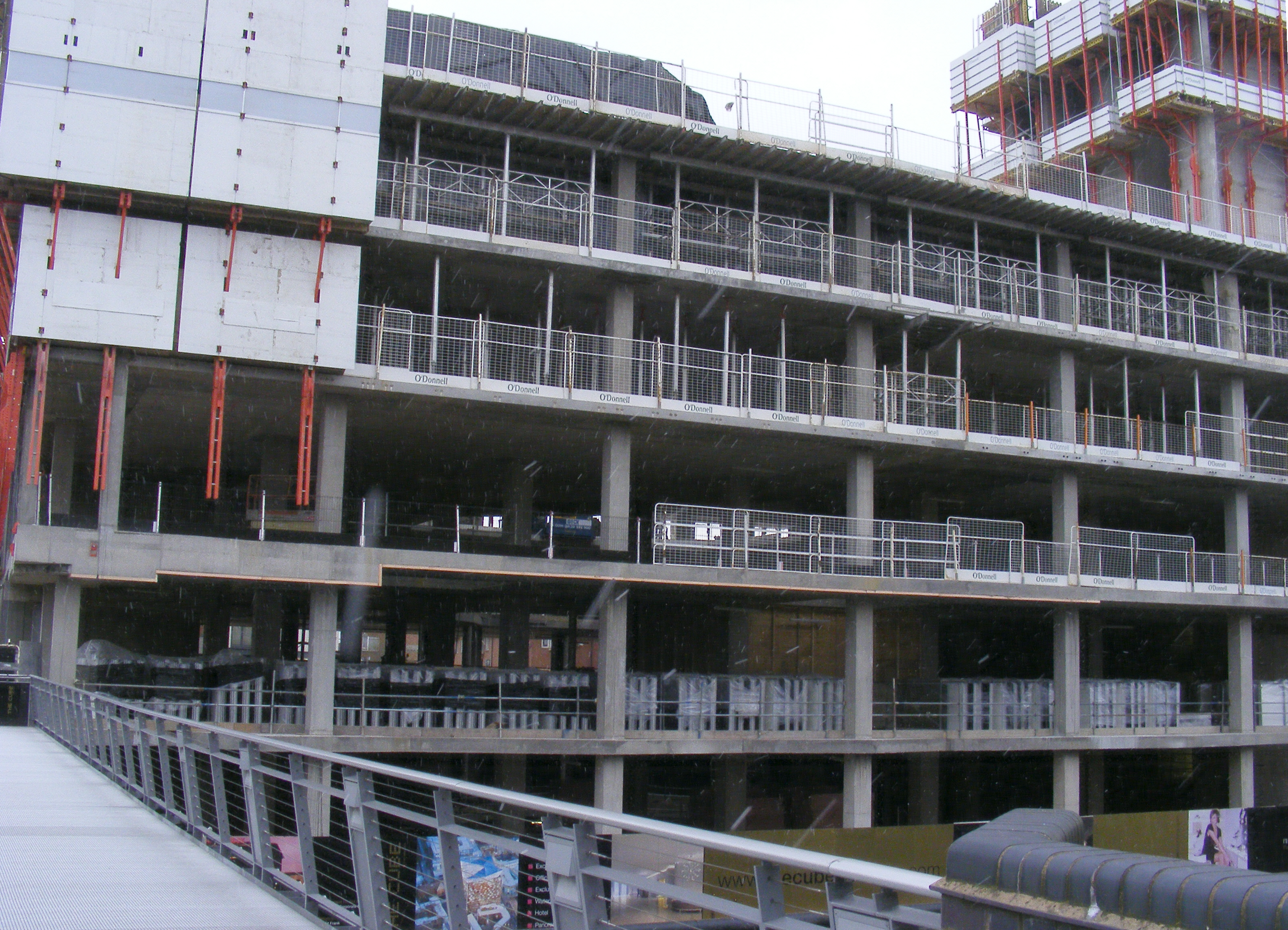
The Cube under construction, February 2009

=== Planning history ===
As the final stage of The Mailbox development, Birmingham Development Company Ltd. decided to organise a design competition for a building on the site. The winning design was submitted by Birmingham-born architect Ken Shuttleworth of Make Architects.

Plans for The Cube were first submitted to Birmingham City Council's Planning Department on 31 August 2005 for outline planning permission. A six-week public consultation stage was implemented immediately, and the planning application received outline planning permission from the Planning Committee on 7 February 2006.

On 17 May 2006, a reserved matters planning application was submitted to Birmingham City Council, the submission of reserved matters for design, external appearance and landscaping relating to the erection of two buildings. One in the form of a cube incorporating a mix of uses to include car parking, retail, restaurant, office, residential, boutique hotel and skyline restaurant, and one plant building in accordance with the application. Full planning permission was granted by the Planning Committee on 7 August 2006.

The project was originally scheduled to be completed in 2008, but has been delayed. Construction company, Taylor Woodrow had won the project from Sir Robert McAlpine and Miller Construction, but had been unable to agree a final price, with the developer, BDC. Due to other contractors being deterred by the complexity of the design, BDC decided to establish their own subsidiary contractor, BuildAbility. This led Building magazine to dub the project 'Britain's biggest DIY job'. Employees of Build Ability are being offered a 60% share of the profits of The Cube as an incentive to encourage recruitment.

=== Construction ===
Preparation for construction commenced in 2007 with the clearance of all structures on site and reconfiguration of a pedestrian bridge towards The Mailbox. Bachy Soletanche Limited (BSL), led by Project Manager Oliver Cooper, then set to work creating a perimeter retaining wall around the site to prevent ground movement whilst the foundations were being constructed. A large diameter auger piling technique was used to install 226, 900 mm (3 ft) diameter piles at 1,050 mm (3 ft) spacings and to depths of 24 m (79 ft). BSL skipped three piles – after installing the first pile – to avoid concrete flowing into the next borehole and therefore damaging the original pile. Due to the presence of groundwater when the piles were bored, a Tremie pipe was used which displaced water to the surface as the bore hole was filled with concrete. At the southwest corner of the site, where the automated car stacking system was to be installed, BSL removed the large diameter auger piles and replaced them with 24Nr, 273 mm (1 ft) diameter minipiles bored to a depth of 24 m (79 ft). Along the western boundary of the site, a further 54 minipiles were installed to a depth of 12 m (39 ft) to provide further support Washington Wharf, an adjacent apartment building. BSL then constructed 30 king post piles to provide the foundation for a temporary ramp which was required for future building works. Each king post pile was formed in a 900 mm (3 ft) diameter pile, with a 400 mm (1 ft) square steel column concreted into the toe of the pile. These piles ran in two parallel rows down the centre of the site from Commercial Street.

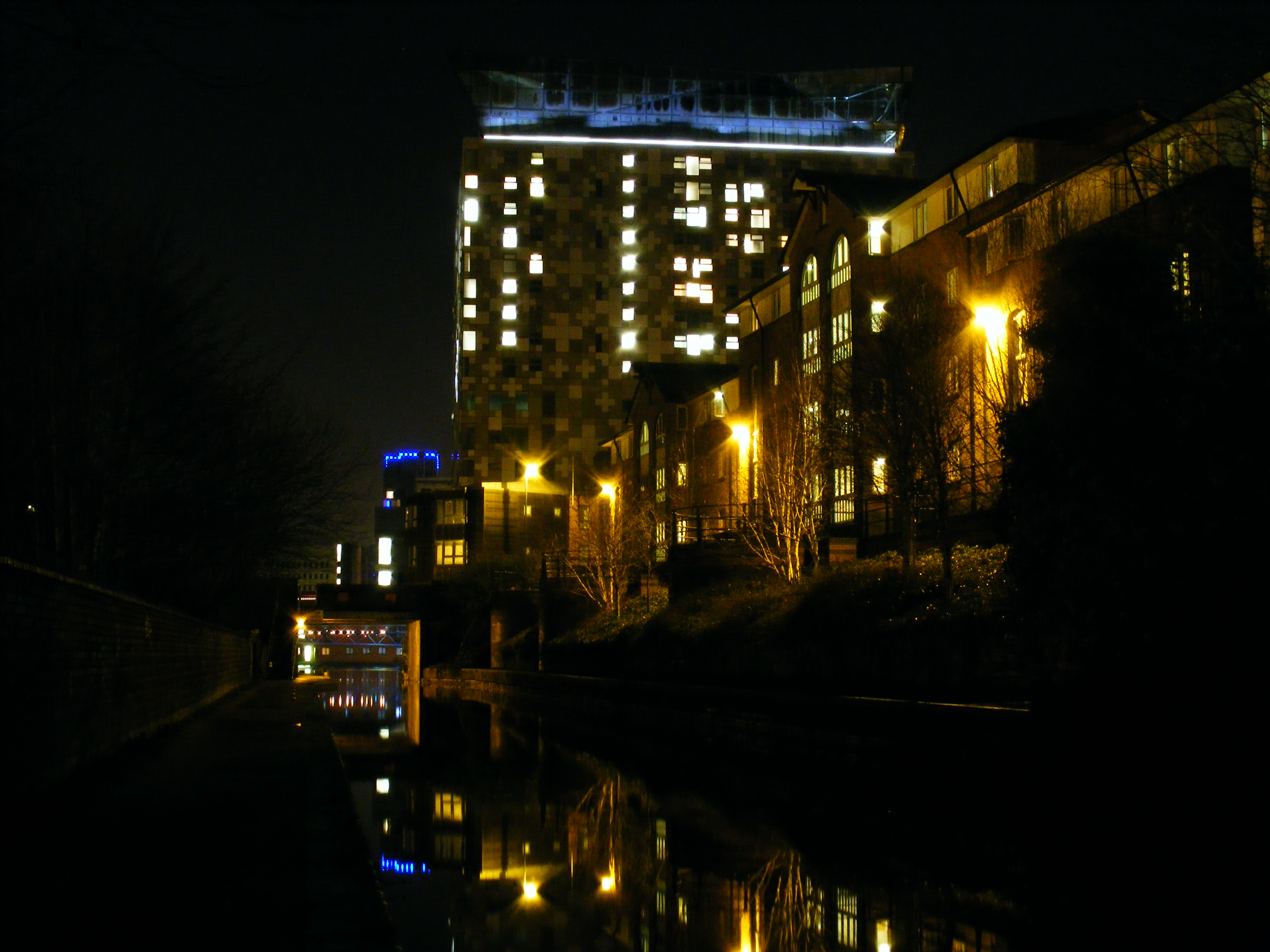
The Cube by night

With all the initial piling works complete, excavation commenced on site by local firm O'Donnell, who had to test various ramp gradients at one of their sites before starting work at the Cube. The optimum gradient for lorries transporting earth from a hill start was recreated at the site, with the surface of the temporary ramp up to Commercial Street being maintained in a coarse condition to give sufficient grip for vehicles entering and leaving the site. A total of 60,000 m^{3} (78,477 cu yd) of earth and sandstone was removed from the site. Once this had been completed, BSL returned to construct 12 temporary anchors to hold back the retaining piles on the east side of the site. BSL completed the piling project at the end of 2007.

BuildAbility then subcontracted work for the construction of the concrete shell to O'Donnell, who assembled two tower cranes at either end of the site. O'Donnell used a formwork construction technique in partnership with PERI Ltd. to construct the cores, columns and basement walls. A rail climbing system was installed, which provided a scaffolding cage around the workforce during building. Lifting platforms were used to reduce the space occupied by scaffolding. An aluminium fast slab formwork system named Skydeck was used to construct the floorplates. BuildAbility decided to use unbonded post-tensioned concrete, an uncommon system in the UK, for the floorplates as this allowed them to be thinner and reduced construction time.

Once the concrete shell had been constructed, work commenced on the construction of the two-storey steel crown which allowed for the installation of the complex glazing system. Formed with box sections in the larger northern tips and UC sections in the southern tips, the wings were delivered to site in pieces no heavier than 7t due to the tower crane's weight limitations. The wings were then welded on site using high-precision welding. The remainder of the structure consists of a composite design with columns of exposed circular hollow sections (CHS), working as an architectural feature. Heavier 600 mm (24 in) deep plate girders were installed in the centre of the crown to support the window cleaning machine. The main body of steelwork for the crown was completed in December 2009, with secondary steelwork onto which the cladding was attached being installed later on.

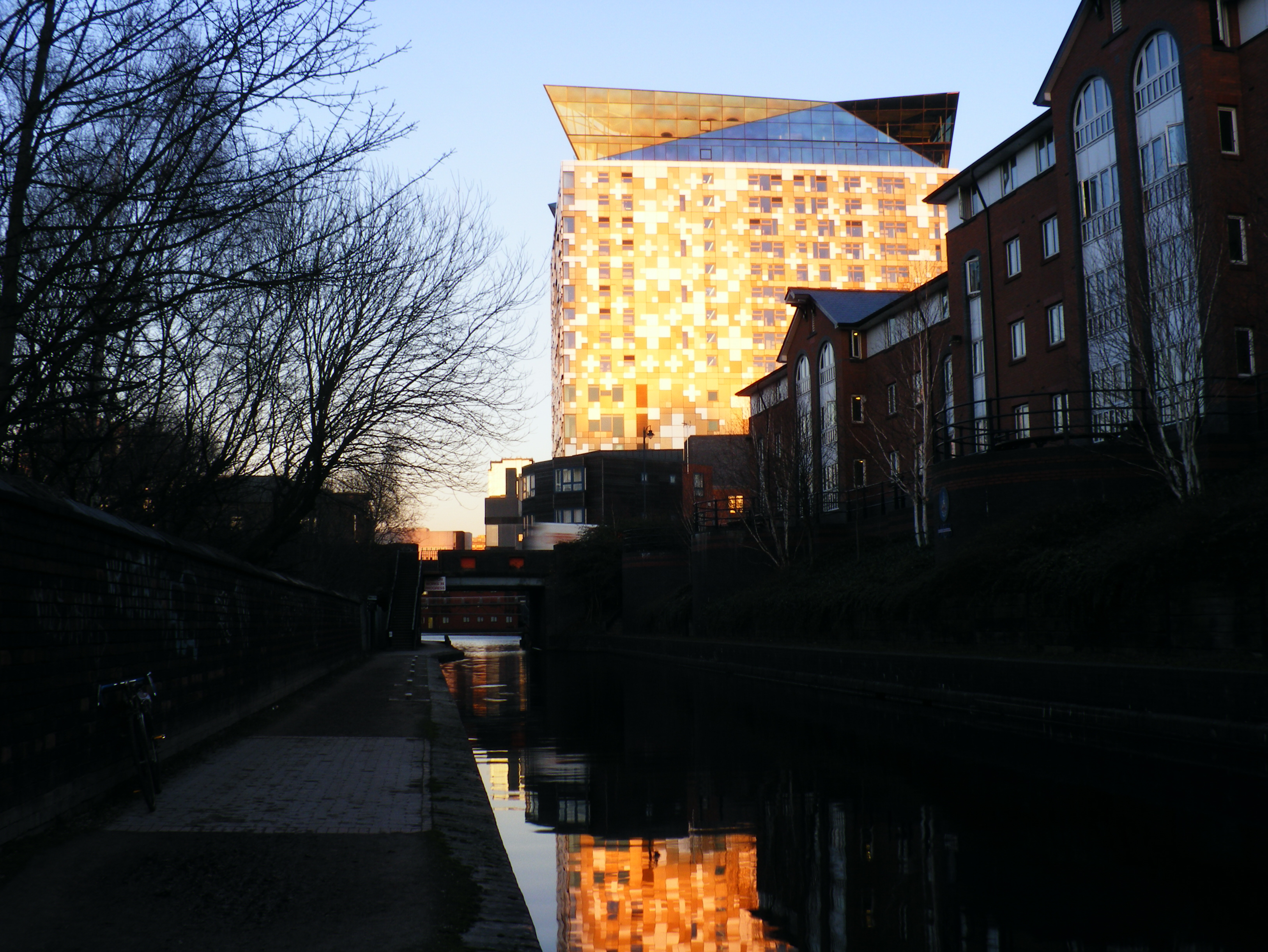
The Cube from the canal

J T Hawkes (Electrical Contractors) who partnered with Robert Prettie and Co were awarded a £28 million contract for HVAC, mechanical and electrical engineering works at the scheme. They subsequently contracted Hattersley to install HVAC compact hook-up units. The units provide flow control, flow measurement, system and coil flushing and isolation capabilities from a single compact and lightweight unit. Built from bronze and DZR brass, they can be used for chilled and heating water systems from –10 °C to 120 °C.

German cladding manufacturer HAGA won the £11 million contract to design, manufacture and install the distinctive cladding, with BDC giving the firm £1 million up-front when the contract was awarded. HAGA contracted Polypipe Ventilation to manufacture over 200 ventilation units which were transported to HAGA's factory in Germany and installed into the cladding for the fretwork. Additionally, HAGA contracted Wicona to assist with the manufacture of the cladding panels, making it the largest project in the UK for the company.

Starting in early 2010, Wöhr Parking Systems installed an automatic car parking system for 339 in the three basement floors of the building. Cars access the car park by entering through Building B and entering one of the four lift-garages. The installation is the largest of its kind in the UK.

The fit-out process for the office space for the Highways Agency by JD Interiors incorporating J T Hawkes (electrical contractors) and Robert Prettie took 35 weeks to complete. Facilities provided include toilet blocks, shower rooms, kitchen areas, first aid areas and prayer rooms. The reception area was fitted out with oak panelling to the ceilings and walls, and glass feature walls and reception desk. The Highways Agency moved their Broadway offices at Five Ways to The Cube in May 2010.

=== Financial issues ===
To fund the construction of The Cube, Birmingham Development Company approached Lloyds TSB, who had funded the company's previous, successful development The Mailbox. Lloyds TSB agreed to fund the development as the sole debt collector and provided a £87 million speculative loan that was to be issued in stages in accordance with the various phases of the project.

However, against the backdrop of a challenging property market, on 26 March 2010 the Lloyds Banking Group called in PricewaterhouseCoopers as administrators to BDC and BuildAbility, after a failure to agree further funding for the project. It was rumoured that the additional funding was requested by BDC due to a budget overrun as a result of the complex design and construction methods.

PricewaterhouseCoopers began by gathering together the main sub-contractors on site and agreeing to complete the project, which was already 80% complete, with new funding being secured from Lloyds TSB.

== Architecture ==
The cubic dimensions of the main design element lends to the name of the development. However, the building consists of three stages with the cube being one of them. The building is constructed of concrete, with two fire-fighting cores rising up either side of the building.

Birmingham-born Ken Shuttleworth, who designed London's Gherkin building with Norman Foster, has stated that the design evokes the city's industrial heritage.

The cladding for me tries to reflect the heavy industries of Birmingham which I remember as a kid, the metal plate works and the car plants – and the inside is very crystalline, all glass; that to me is like the jewellery side of Birmingham, the lightbulbs and delicate stuff – it tries to reflect the essence of Birmingham in the building itself.

=== Base ===
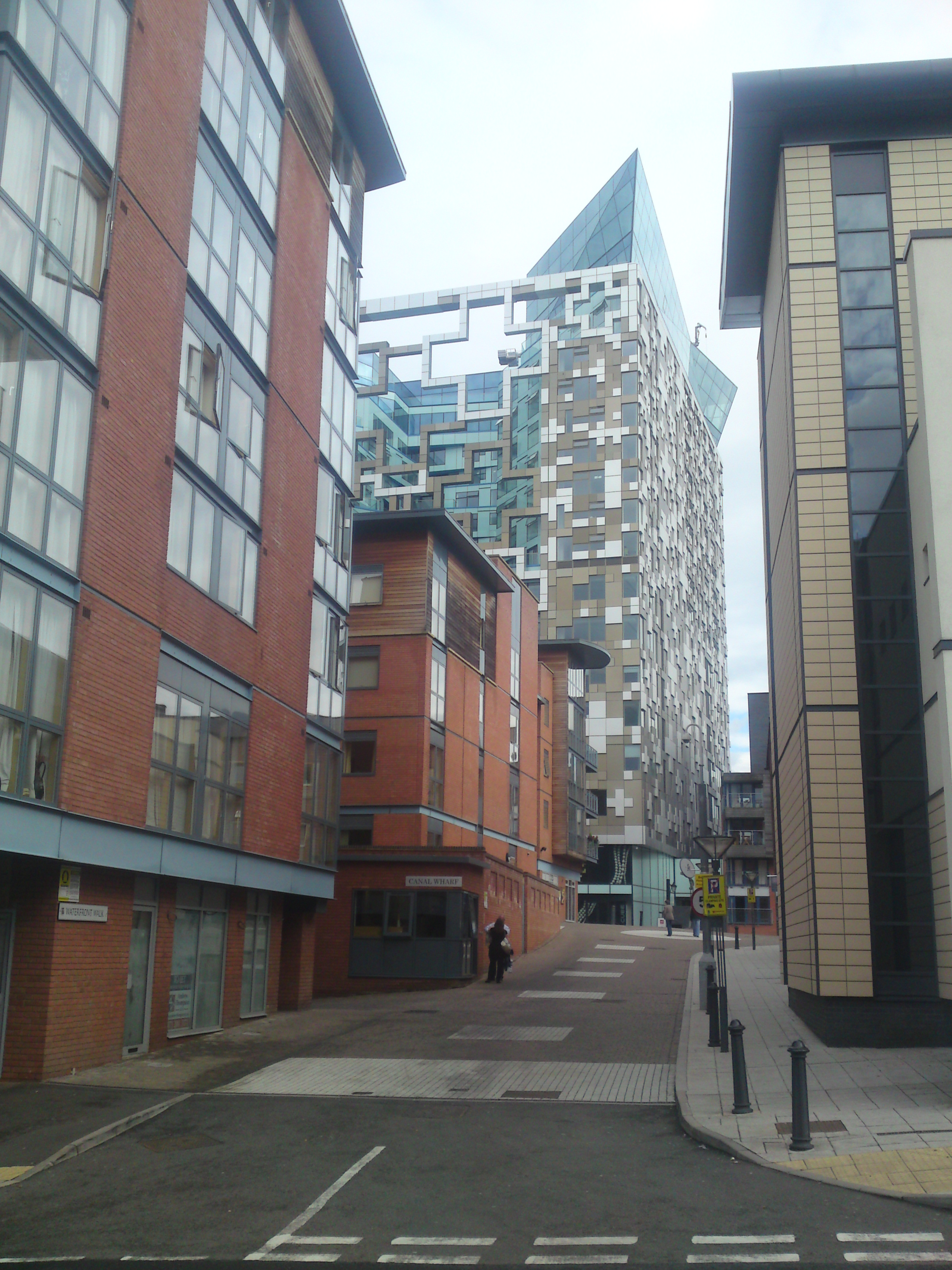
Front of the Cube

At ground level there is a fully glazed base that is two storeys tall at the canal elevation and one storey in height at the Commercial Street elevation, to the gradients across the site. The base houses two out of the four retail levels, with the ground floor also accommodating public toilets and a Health Club and Spa operated by Hotel Indigo above, which will be discretely accessed by the main hotel lifts.

The floor below the canal towpath level will be a courtyard area with a £250,000 public art piece created by Wolverhampton-born graffiti artist Temper. Rising up through the building from the courtyard is a six-sided, twisting atrium that allows rain to fall into the courtyard area with shelter being provided by walkways on the upper levels and canopies. Access to the floors above is provided by escalators.

=== Cube ===
Sitting on top of the base, is a perfect cube element measuring 53.1 m (174 ft) in height, width and breadth. The cube consists of 16 floors, with retail distributed on the lower two storeys, office space on the above five floors, residential apartments on the above nine levels, with the top floor of the cube being shared with Hotel Indigo. The Cube residential apartments are separated into East and West Wing. East Wing is strictly limited to owner occupiers, according to contract it is not allowed to let. West Wing is buy-to-let, owner may occupy the flats or let to tenants. East and West Wings have connections on each floor inside the building, but locked fire doors prevent access to different wings. The floor to floor height of the retail floors will be 4.5 metres (15 ft), whilst this is reduced to 3.75 metres (12 ft) on the office floors and further reduced to 3 metres (10 ft) on the residential and hotel floors.

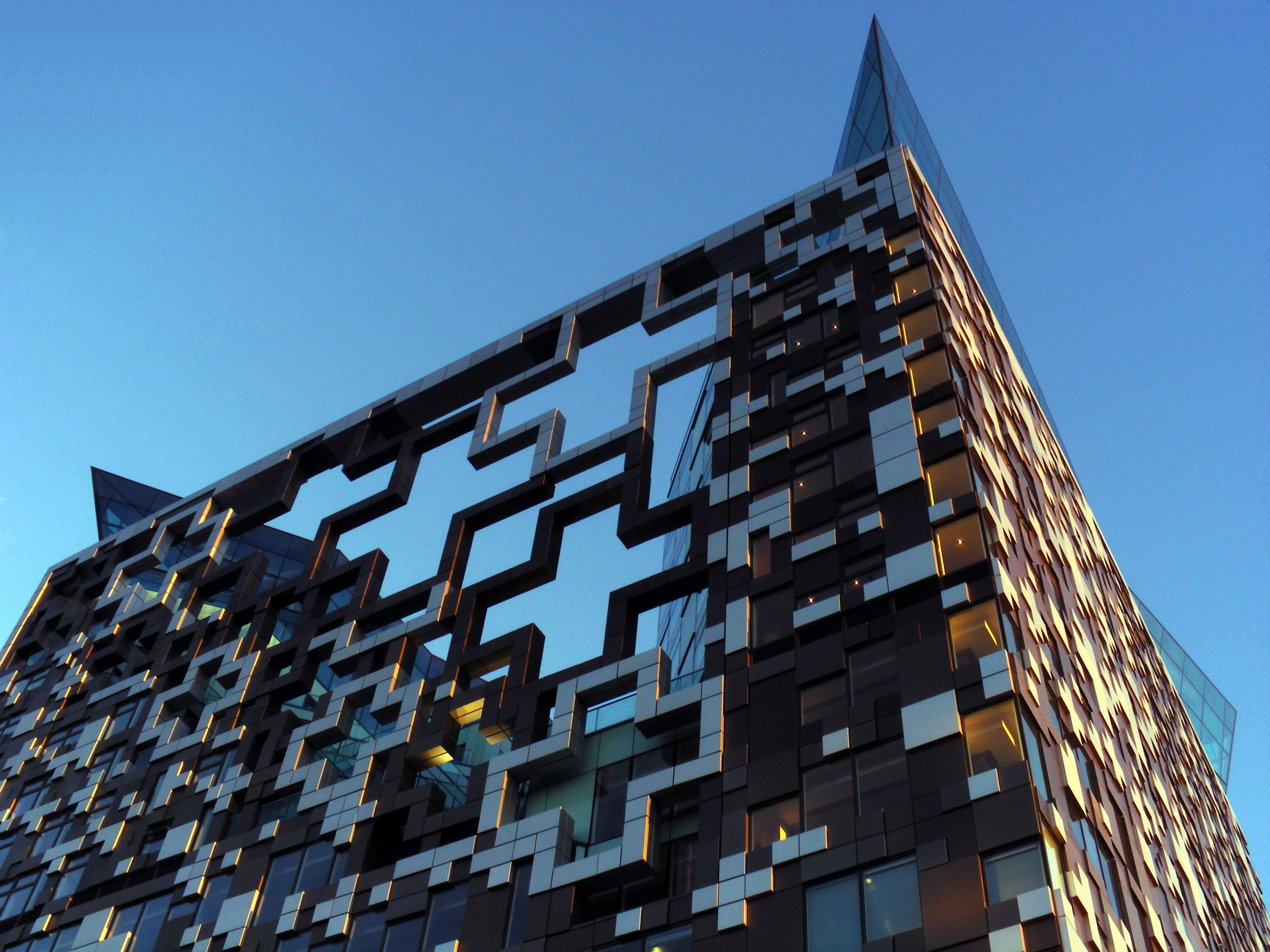
Canal-side elevation showing opening at residential level, and the crown

The exterior of the cube is being clad in glazed and gold colour anodised aluminium panels with structural silicone bonding to the mullions. There are a total of over 2,100 panels used, with the aluminium panels projecting 300 millimetres (12 in) from the glazing. The cladding units were manufactured in lengths of 3 m (10 ft) and 3.75 m (12 ft), depending on the floor to floor heights. Each panel was designed on a 750 mm (2 ft) geometric module, maintaining the illusion that each floor was of an equal height. Insulation was added behind the metal boxes in the cladding units.

The atrium rising through the cube meant that cladding is needed on the interior. This will be composed of polyester powder coated aluminium mullions and transoms incorporating double glazed units, as well as polyester powder coated aluminium panels with an outer glazed panel and a ceramic frit application, which will create a consistent glossy appearance throughout the atrium. These will be bonded with structural silicone. At the point where residential levels start, the atrium expands out and creates an opening in the canal elevation of the cube's facade. The opening will hold a large fretwork of various shapes of various sizes, constructed out of steel box sections. These were then covered with a cladding system consistent with that used along the exterior. Along the top of the fretwork will be a fabricated truss section, composed of four pieces, that will provide lateral stability in the fretwork.

The Cube offers concierge service to East Wing residents only. The concierge takes care of parcel arrival and provides useful information for residents and present 24 hours a day.

=== Crown ===
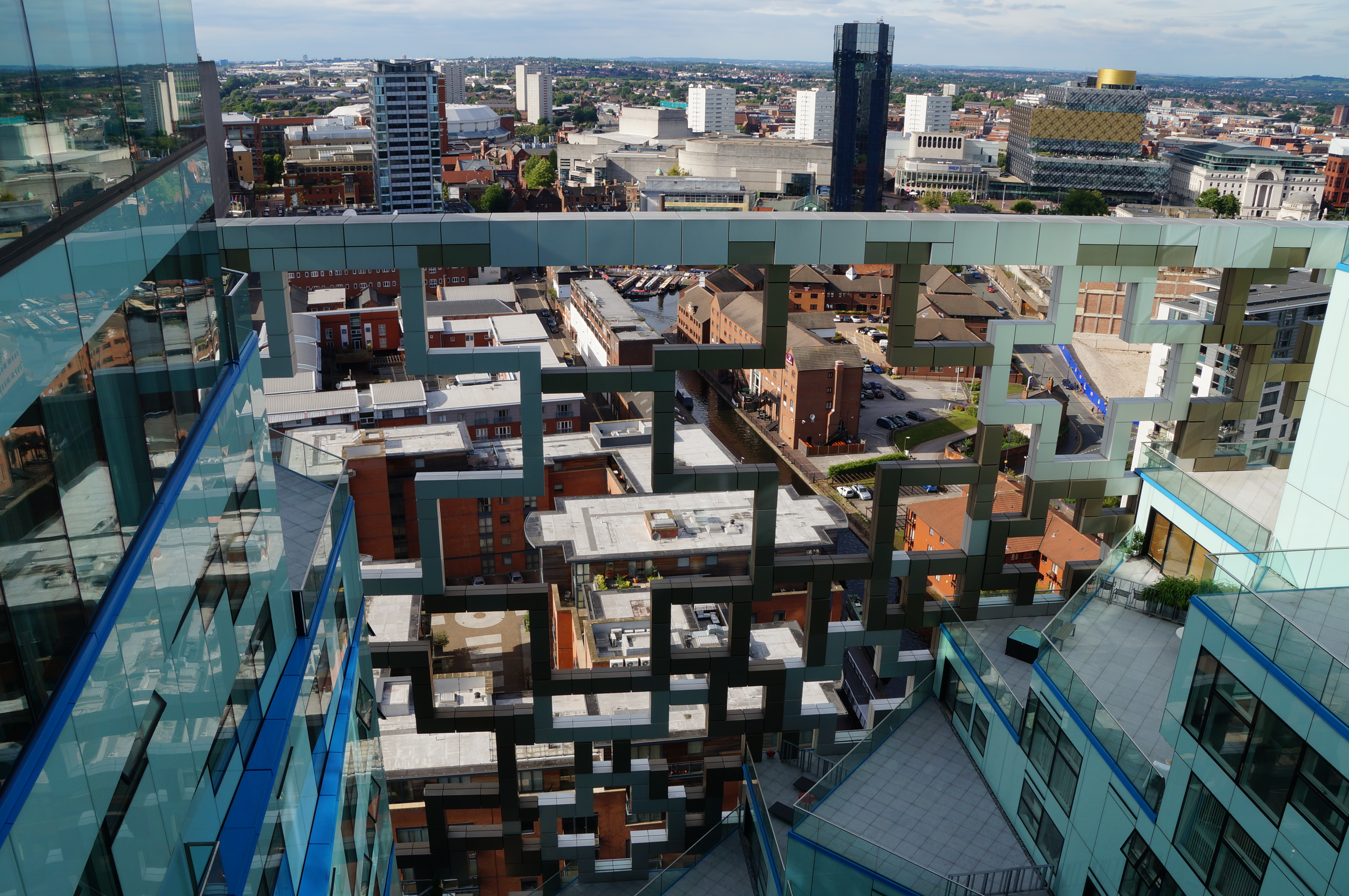
View from restaurant on level 24, looking north-west

The third element is the two storey crown that sits on top of the cube element. It is two storeys in height and will house facilities for the boutique hotel and a rooftop restaurant with skybar, offering panoramic views of the city centre. Unlike the rest of the Cube, the crown is constructed from a steel frame due to the complexity of the glazing. Four of the corners overhang the edge of the cube element, creating an angular form. The restaurant was designed by Conran & Partners and was to be operated by D&D London, in their first venture outside London, but they later pulled out. The new restaurant called "Steakhouse Bar and Grill" by Marco Pierre White opened in December 2011. It takes up the entire 14,000 sq ft (1,300 m^{2}) top floor of the scheme as part of a £10 million investment by Sanguine Hospitality Limited.

=== Building B ===
Building B is the name for the entrance block to the car parking garage, which uses an automated car stacking system. The brick building houses plant on the roof, hidden from view by a brick parapet. Access to the building is via steel rolling shutters on Commercial Street.
