= Martin Jochman =

British architect

Martin Jochman Dip Arch RIBA is a British architect who is the designer of The InterContinental Shanghai Wonderland, an 88-meter deep underground hotel that was built in an abandoned rock quarry in China.

In 2012 Martin Jochman established Studio JADE +QA ( Jochman Architecture Design Environment Ltd + Quarry Associates (HK) Ltd in Shanghai, China to continue the work on the Shimao Quarry Hotel after signing a contract with the developer. Since opening the studio, JADE+QA completed construction of 5 major projects in China and established an associated office in the United Kingdom.

In 2011, Martin was awarded a Gold prize for the Shimao Wonderland Intercontinental hotel at the MIPIM Asia awards in Hong Kong.
