= Make Architects =

British architecture studio

- Industry: Architecture
- Founded: 2004
- Founder: Ken Shuttleworth
- Headquarters: London, United Kingdom
- Website: www.makearchitects.com

Make Architects is an international architecture practice headquartered in London that also has offices in offices in Hong Kong and Shanghai. Founded in 2004 by former Foster + Partners architect Ken Shuttleworth. The practice has a variety of projects including high-rise office buildings, large mixed-use schemes, urban masterplanning, sports and leisure, private and social housing, civic and education buildings, and interior design. The company is employee-owned and refers to its partners as "makers".

== Selected projects ==
Arts & Culture

- City of London Information Centre
- The Podium
- Weihai Pavilion
- Beijing InfoCube
- Seymour Centre

Education & Research

- Jubilee Campus extension, University of Nottingham
- The Barn, University of Nottingham
- The Gateway Building, University of Nottingham
- Big Data Institute, University of Oxford
- The Kennedy Institute of Rheumatology, University of Oxford
- The Nuffield Department of Medicine, University of Oxford
- Old Road Campus Research Building, University of Oxford
- Oxford Molecular Pathology Institute, University of Oxford
- The Thomas Clarkson Community College, Cambridgeshire

Hotels and resorts

- Mi Xun Spa
- The Montpellier Chapter
- The Oasis at Golden Sands
- Serensia Woods
- The Temple House
- Wanda Reign Wuhan

Mixed use

- Amory Tower, London
- Hornsey Town Hall
- 80 Charlotte Street
- The Cube, Birmingham
- LSQ London
- Morello
- Rathbone Square
- St James's Market
- Wynyard Place

Office

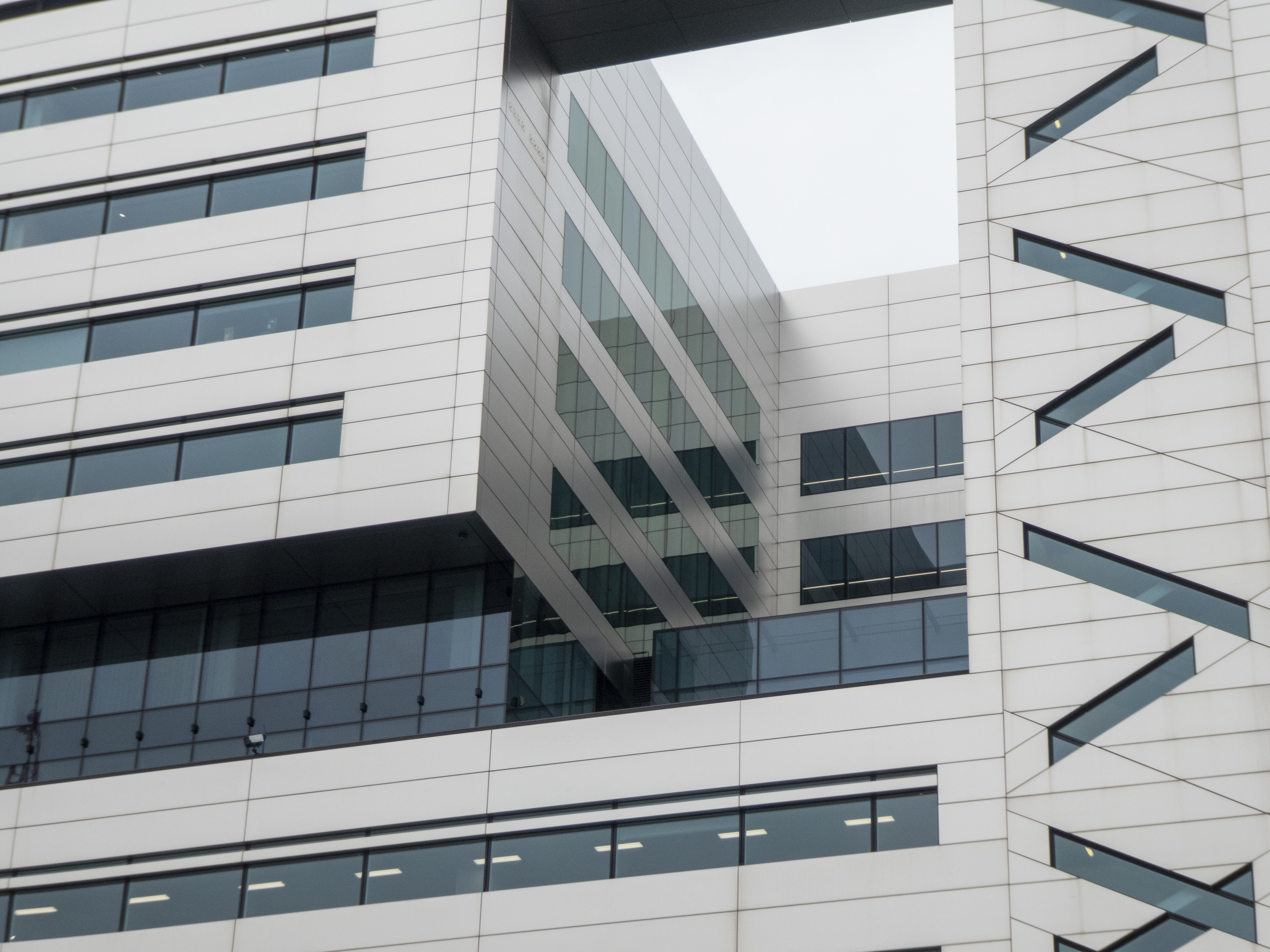
5 Broadgate

- 1 Arena Central
- Two Arena Central
- 20 Ropemaker Street
- 3 Arena Central
- 55 Baker Street, London
- 5 Broadgate, City of London
- 32 Cleveland Street
- The Hiscox Building
- HSBC Blandonnet
- London Wall Place
- The Monument Building
- Quai des Bergues

Residential

- 10 Weymouth Street
- 4–16 Artillery Row
- 12–24 Lun Fat Street
- Dunbar Place
- Chobham Manor
- Century House
- Crescent House
- Grosvenor Waterside
- Morello Croydon
- Rodmarton Street

Sports and leisure

- The Copper Box (London 2012 Olympic Handball Arena)
- The Dartford Dojo
- Greenwich Centre

Urban design

- Chobham Manor
- Elephant and Castle
- Greenwich Square
- Wembley North West Lands

== Awards and recognitions ==
In 2016 the practice won the Architects' Journal AJ100 Employer of the Year Award and in 2014 won the AJ100 Practice of the Year Award.

The company's work has been nominated three times for Building Design magazine's Carbuncle Cup, an annual award for "the ugliest building in the United Kingdom". Nottingham University Jubilee Campus was runner-up in 2009, The Cube in Birmingham was nominated in 2010, and the redevelopment of 5 Broadgate was nominated in 2016.
