= Brogan Group =

Group of access companies operating in the UK

Brogan Group Ltd
- Company type: Private
- Industry: Construction
- Founded: 1988; 38 years ago
- Founder: James Brogan
- Headquarters: London, United Kingdom
- Key people: James Brogan; (Managing Director)
- Products: Scaffolding; Hoists; Mastclimbers
- Website: www.brogangroup.com

Brogan Group is an international group of access companies operating in the United Kingdom, Ireland, Saudi Arabia and the United Arab Emirates. The company was founded by James Brogan in 1988 and is one of the United Kingdom's largest specialist access companies. The Brogan Group provides services to the construction industry, including scaffolding, construction hoists, common towers, mast climbers, crane decks and cradles. In April 2020, Brogan Group won the Queen’s Award for Enterprise.

== History ==
Along with the wider construction sector, scaffolding contractors such as Brogan Group experienced a significant drop in turnover during the Great Recession.

== Services ==
Brogan Group provides access to a range of construction projects, including airports, hospitals, schools, roads, office blocks, shopping centres, high rise apartments, bridges, railways, historic and listed buildings.

== Major projects ==
Brogan Group have provided access for construction projects internationally:

- Battersea Power Station, London (ongoing)
- Museum of the Future, Dubai (Completed in 2019)
- Jumeirah Beach Hotel, Dubai (Completed in 2018, recipient of an RIBA National Award in 2019)
- 20 Fenchurch Street, London (Completed in 2014)
- Capital Gate ‘Splash’, Dubai (Completed in 2010)
- Heathrow Terminal 5 (Completed in 2008)
- West Tower, (Liverpool completed in 2008)
- The Beetham Tower, Manchester (completed in 2007)
- Kileen Castle (completed in 2005)
- the Elm Park development (completed in 2004)
- The Regent’s Quarter re-development at Kings Cross (completed in 2002)
- Ha'penny Bridge (completed in 2001)
- Royal Opera House (completed in 2000)
