= Ken Shuttleworth (architect) =

British architect

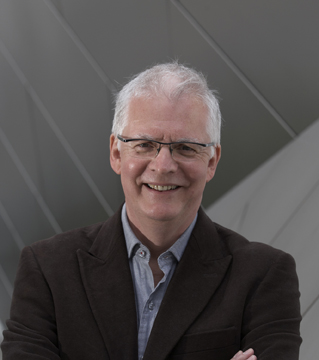
- Born: 1952 (age 73–74); Birmingham, United Kingdom
- Education: Leicester School of Architecture
- Occupation: Architect
- Practice: Make Architects
- Buildings: London 2012 Olympic Handball Arena; The Cube; Swiss Re Headquarters; Wembley Stadium
- Website: www.makearchitects.com

Ken Shuttleworth (born September 1952 in Birmingham) is an English architect.

Shuttleworth studied architecture at the Leicester School of Architecture, De Montfort University, where his fluid draftsmanship earned him the nickname "Ken the Pen".

Shuttleworth became a partner at Foster and Partners where he worked on some of the world's most iconic buildings. He joined the practice in 1977, moving to Hong Kong in 1979 to oversee the design and construction of The Hongkong and Shanghai Banking Corporation’s headquarters. Returning to the UK in 1986, he proceeded to build up a diverse portfolio of experience including the Carré d'Art in Nîmes, the ITN building in London, Cranfield University Library, Hong Kong’s Chek Lap Kok airport, the Al Faisaliah development in Riyadh, London’s Millennium Bridge, 30 St Mary Axe ('The Gherkin’) and City Hall.

Shuttleworth left Foster and Partners to set up his own practice, Make Architects, in 2004. The practice has completed a number of award-winning buildings which include the City of London Information Centre, the 55 Baker Street office development, Grosvenor Waterside and 10 Weymouth Street residential schemes, all in central London. Other completed projects in the UK include The Cube in Birmingham, the Montpellier Chapter hotel in Cheltenham, the Oxford Molecular Pathology Institute for the University of Oxford, and the Handball Arena for the London 2012 Olympics, known as the Copper Box.

Projects currently under construction include the Thomas Clarkson Community College in Cambridgeshire, a student housing scheme in Hammersmith, a children’s hospital in Kurdistan, a boutique hotel in China and a residential tower in Hong Kong.

Shuttleworth and members of his staff appeared in the final of the UK 2007 edition of The Apprentice, where they advised the two remaining contestants on designing an iconic building for London's South Bank.

Ken Shuttleworth was a commissioner of the Commission for Architecture and the Built Environment (CABE) from 2004–2011 - an executive non-departmental public body of the UK government which promoted better design and design education.

== Projects on which Shuttleworth has worked ==
At Make Architects

- The Cube, Birmingham
- The Thomas Clarkson Community College, Cambridgeshire
- City of London Information Centre
- 5 Broadgate, London
- 55 Baker Street, London
- The Aspire sculpture, University of Nottingham
- The Gateway Building, University of Nottingham
- The Jubilee Campus extension, University of Nottingham
- Old Road Campus Research Building, University of Oxford
- Oxford Molecular Pathology Institute, University of Oxford
- London 2012 Olympic Handball Arena
- The Montpellier Chapter, Cheltenham
- The former Hammersmith Palais, London
- Grosvenor Waterside, London
- 10 Weymouth Street, London

At Foster and Partners

- City Hall, London
- The Arch at Wembley Stadium, London
- Chek Lap Kok airport, Hong Kong
- The Commerzbank Tower, Frankfurt
- 30 St Mary Axe ('The Gherkin'), London
- The Millennium Bridge, London
- The Hongkong and Shanghai Banking Corporation headquarters, Hong Kong
- Citibank's headquarters, London
- Kings Norton Library, Cranfield University
